= 2018 Darwin Tennis International =

- Date: 24–30 September
- Edition: 5th
- Category: ITF Men's Circuit; ITF Women's Circuit
- Prize money: $25,000 (men) $60,000 (women)
- Surface: Hard
- Location: Darwin, Australia

Champions

Men's singles
- (Japan) Yuta Shimizu

Women's singles
- (Australia) Kimberly Birrell

Men's doubles
- (Australia) Jeremy Beale / (Australia) Thomas Fancutt

Women's doubles
- (India) Rutuja Bhosale / (Japan) Hiroko Kuwata
- Darwin Tennis International

The 2018 Darwin Tennis International was a professional tennis tournament played on outdoor hard courts. It was the fifth edition of the tournament and was part of the 2018 ITF Men's Circuit and the 2018 ITF Women's Circuit. It took place in Darwin, Australia, on 24–30 September 2018.

== Women's singles main draw entrants ==
=== Seeds ===
Country	Player	Rank^{1}	Seed
AUS	Olivia Rogowska	162	2
AUS	Arina Rodionova	168	1
~~AUS~~	~~Priscilla Hon~~	~~173~~	~~3~~
AUS	Jaimee Fourlis	190	4
KOR	Jang Su-jeong	204	5
GBR	Katy Dunne	226	6
JPN	Eri Hozumi	241	7
AUS	Destanee Aiava	247	8

- ^{1} Rankings as of 17 September 2018.

=== Other entrants ===
The following players received a wildcard into the singles main draw:

- (Australia) Alison Bai
- (Australia) Naiktha Bains
- (Australia) Kaylah McPhee
- (Australia) Olivia Tjandramulia

The following players received entry from the qualifying draw:

- (Australia) Maddison Inglis
- (Japan) Kyōka Okamura
- (France) Irina Ramialison
- (Slovakia) Zuzana Zlochová

The following player received entry as a lucky loser:

- (Ukraine) Marianna Zakarlyuk

== Men's singles main draw entrants ==
=== Seeds ===
Country	Player	Rank^{1}	Seed
JPN	Yuta Shimizu	407	2
AUS	Jeremy Beale	497	1
AUS	Thomas Fancutt	571	3
GBR	Brydan Klein	635	4
AUS	Michael Look	644	5
GBR	Evan Hoyt	693	6
AUS	Jacob Grills	746	7
NZL	Rhett Purcell	753	8

- ^{1} Rankings as of 17 September 2018.

=== Other entrants ===
The following players received a wildcard into the singles main draw:

- (Australia) Ken Cavrak
- (Australia) Alexander Crnokrak
- (Australia) Jesse Delaney
- (Australia) Mustafa Ibraimi

The following player received entry into the singles main draw by a special exempt:

- (Australia) Jayden Court

The following players received entry from the qualifying draw:

- (Australia) David Barclay
- (Australia) Corey Gaal
- (United States) Christian Langmo
- (Australia) Winter Meagher
- (Japan) Masayoshi Ono
- (France) Vincent Stouff
- (Australia) Jacob Sullivan
- (Australia) Socrates Leon Tsoronis

== Champions ==
=== Women's singles ===
- (Australia) Kimberly Birrell def. (Australia) Ellen Perez, 6–3, 6–3

=== Men's singles ===
- (Japan) Yuta Shimizu def. (United Kingdom) Evan Hoyt, 7–6^{(8–6)}, 3–6, 6–4

=== Women's doubles ===
- (India) Rutuja Bhosale / (Japan) Hiroko Kuwata def. (Australia) Kimberly Birrell / (United Kingdom) Katy Dunne, 6–2, 6–4

=== Men's doubles ===
- (Australia) Jeremy Beale / (Australia) Thomas Fancutt def. (United Kingdom) Brydan Klein / (Australia) Scott Puodziunas, 7–6^{(7–4)}, 6–3
