= 2019 Darwin Tennis International – Women's singles =

Professional tennis players tournament

Women's singles
- 2019 Darwin Tennis International

Final
- Champion: (Australia) Lizette Cabrera
- Runner-up: (Australia) Abbie Myers
- Score: 6–4, 4–6, 6–2

Events
Singles	men	women
Doubles	men	women
← 2018 ·	Darwin Tennis International	· 2020 →

Kimberly Birrell was the defending champion, but chose not to participate.

Lizette Cabrera won the title, defeating Abbie Myers in the final, 6–4, 4–6, 6–2.

== Seeds ==
1. (Australia) Zoe Hives (quarterfinals)
2. (Australia) Lizette Cabrera (champion)
3. (Australia) Maddison Inglis (quarterfinals)
4. (Australia) Destanee Aiava (second round)
5. (Australia) Kaylah McPhee (second round)
6. (China) Xu Shilin (first round)
7. (Japan) Ayano Shimizu (second round)
8. (United Kingdom) Naiktha Bains (first round)

== Draw ==
=== Key ===
- Q = Qualifier
- WC = Wild card
- LL = Lucky loser
- Alt = Alternate
- SE = Special exempt
- PR = Protected ranking
- ITF = ITF entry
- JE = Junior exempt
- w/o = Walkover
- r = Retired
- d = Defaulted
- SR = Special ranking

=== Finals ===
Semifinals
(Australia) Abbie Myers	6	6^{3}	7^{7}
WC	(Australia) Ivana Popovic	2	7^{7}	6^{4}
(United States) Asia Muhammad	6^{4}	6	3
2	(Australia) Lizette Cabrera	7^{7}	3	6

Final
(Australia) Abbie Myers	4	6	2
2	(Australia) Lizette Cabrera	6	4	6

=== Top half ===
First round
1	(Australia) Z Hives	6	3	6
(Australia) J Fourlis	3	6	3
Q	(Belgium) M Kempen	4	6	3
Q	(Japan) N Hanatani	6	1	6
(Japan) M Imanishi	5	2
(Australia) A Myers	7	6
WC	(Australia) A Bozovic	4	6	3
7	(Japan) A Shimizu	6	3	6
4	(Australia) D Aiava	6	4	7
WC	(Australia) A Bai	2	6	5
WC	(Australia) I Popovic	6	6
WC	(Australia) G Da Silva-Fick	4	3
(Australia) O Rogowska	6	6^{6}	6
(Thailand) N Luangnam	1	7^{8}	2
(Australia) B Woolcock	6	6
6	(China) S Xu	2	2

Second round
1	(Australia) Z Hives	6	6
Q	(Japan) N Hanatani	0	2
(Australia) A Myers	6	6
7	(Japan) A Shimizu	1	4
4	(Australia) D Aiava	4	2
WC	(Australia) I Popovic	6	6
(Australia) O Rogowska	6	7
(Australia) B Woolcock	2	5

Quarterfinals
1	(Australia) Z Hives	2	4
(Australia) A Myers	6	6
WC	(Australia) I Popovic	7^{7}	7^{7}
(Australia) O Rogowska	6^{3}	6^{5}

Semifinals
(Australia) A Myers	6	6^{3}	7^{7}
WC	(Australia) I Popovic	2	7^{7}	6^{4}

=== Bottom half ===
First round
8	(United Kingdom) N Bains	4	4
(United States) A Muhammad	6	6
Q	(Hong Kong) H-c Wu	6	6
Q	(Australia) A Osborne	4	4
(Japan) R Ozaki	2	4
(Japan) C Muramatsu	6	6
Q	(Japan) H Arakawa	4	0
3	(Australia) M Inglis	6	6
5	(Australia) K McPhee	3	6	7^{9}
Q	(Australia) A Marshall	6	2	6^{7}
(Slovakia) Z Zlochová	6^{4}	6	6
Q	(United States) J Elie	7^{7}	3	3
(Chinese Taipei) Y-h Lee	3	6	6
Q	(Japan) M Ozeki	6	4	0
(Japan) M Kobori	2	0
2	(Australia) L Cabrera	6	6

Second round
(United States) A Muhammad	6	6
Q	(Hong Kong) H-c Wu	1	2
(Japan) C Muramatsu	0	1
3	(Australia) M Inglis	6	6
5	(Australia) K McPhee	1	4
(Slovakia) Z Zlochová	6	6
(Chinese Taipei) Y-h Lee	5	4
2	(Australia) L Cabrera	7	6

Quarterfinals
(United States) A Muhammad	6	6
3	(Australia) M Inglis	1	4
(Slovakia) Z Zlochová	6	6^{3}	2
2	(Australia) L Cabrera	2	7^{7}	6

Semifinals
(United States) A Muhammad	6^{4}	6	3
2	(Australia) L Cabrera	7^{7}	3	6
