= 2018 Darwin Tennis International – Women's singles =

Women's singles
- 2018 Darwin Tennis International

Final
- Champion: (Australia) Kimberly Birrell
- Runner-up: (Australia) Ellen Perez
- Score: 6–3, 6–3

Events
| Singles | men | women |
| Doubles | men | women |
| ← 2011 · | Darwin Tennis International | · 2019 → |

Casey Dellacqua was the defending champion having won the previous edition in 2011, however she had retired from professional tennis in April 2018.

Kimberly Birrell won the title, defeating Ellen Perez in an all-Australian final, 6–3, 6–3.

== Seeds ==
1. (Australia) Olivia Rogowska (quarterfinals)
2. (Australia) Arina Rodionova (first round)
3. (Australia) Priscilla Hon (withdrew)
4. (Australia) Jaimee Fourlis (first round)
5. (South Korea) Jang Su-jeong (first round)
6. (United Kingdom) Katy Dunne (first round)
7. (Japan) Eri Hozumi (first round)
8. (Australia) Destanee Aiava (second round)

== Draw ==
=== Key ===
- Q = Qualifier
- WC = Wild card
- LL = Lucky loser
- Alt = Alternate
- SE = Special exempt
- PR = Protected ranking
- ITF = ITF entry
- JE = Junior exempt
- w/o = Walkover
- r = Retired
- d = Defaulted
- SR = Special ranking

=== Finals ===
Semifinals
(Australia) Kimberly Birrell | 6 | 2
Q | (Slovakia) Zuzana Zlochová | 4 | 1^{r}
(Australia) Ellen Perez | 6 | 6
WC | (Australia) Naiktha Bains | 2 | 3

Final
(Australia) Kimberly Birrell | 6 | 6
(Australia) Ellen Perez | 3 | 3

=== Top half ===
First round
1 | (Australia) O Rogowska | 6 | 6
WC | (Australia) O Tjandramulia | 4 | 1
(Italy) G Brescia | 7^{7} | 7^{7}
(Japan) M Minokoshi | 6^{2} | 6^{4}
(Australia) K Birrell | 6 | 6
(Japan) R Ozaki | 4 | 1
Q | (Australia) M Inglis | 3 | 5
8 | (Australia) D Aiava | 6 | 7
LL | (Ukraine) M Zakarlyuk | 2 | 7^{7} | 2
Q | (France) I Ramialison | 6 | 6^{5} | 6
(Australia) Z Hives | 6 | 4 | 6
(Japan) H Kuwata | 2 | 6 | 4
(Australia) A Myers | 6^{3} | 1
Q | (Slovakia) Z Zlochová | 7^{7} | 6
Q | (Japan) K Okamura | 6 | 6
6 | (United Kingdom) K Dunne | 4 | 4

Second round
1 | (Australia) O Rogowska | 6 | 6
(Italy) G Brescia | 3 | 2
(Australia) K Birrell | 6 | 6
8 | (Australia) D Aiava | 1 | 1
Q | (France) I Ramialison | 4 | 6 | 6
(Australia) Z Hives | 6 | 3 | 3
Q | (Slovakia) Z Zlochová | 6 | 6
Q | (Japan) K Okamura | 4 | 0

Quarterfinals
1 | (Australia) O Rogowska | 6^{6} | 3
(Australia) K Birrell | 7^{8} | 6
Q | (France) I Ramialison | 5 | 6^{8}
Q | (Slovakia) Z Zlochová | 7 | 7^{10}

Semifinals
(Australia) K Birrell | 6 | 2
Q | (Slovakia) Z Zlochová | 4 | 1^{r}

=== Bottom half ===
First round
7 | (Japan) E Hozumi | 4 | 2
(Hong Kong) L Zhang | 6 | 6
(China) S Xu | 6 | 7^{8}
(Japan) E Sema | 2 | 6^{6}
WC | (Australia) A Bai | 1 | 3
(Australia) A Sharma | 6 | 6
(Australia) E Perez | 6 | 6^{3} | 6
4 | (Australia) J Fourlis | 4 | 7^{7} | 3
5 | (South Korea) S-j Jang | 2 | 6 | 3
(Hungary) D Gálfi | 6 | 1 | 6
WC | (Australia) N Bains | 6 | 7^{7}
(Papua New Guinea) A Tere-Apisah | 2 | 6^{3}
(Japan) H Kaji | 6 | 6
WC | (Australia) K McPhee | 1 | 1
(Chinese Taipei) Y-h Lee | 6 | 6
2 | (Australia) Ar Rodionova | 2 | 4

Second round
(Hong Kong) L Zhang | 1 | 6 | 6
(China) S Xu | 6 | 4 | 2
(Australia) A Sharma | 6^{4} | 1
(Australia) E Perez | 7^{7} | 6
(Hungary) D Gálfi | 4 | 3
WC | (Australia) N Bains | 6 | 6
(Japan) H Kaji | 6 | 6
(Chinese Taipei) Y-h Lee | 3 | 3

Quarterfinals
(Hong Kong) L Zhang | 6^{5} | 3
(Australia) E Perez | 7^{7} | 6
WC | (Australia) N Bains | 6^{5} | 6 | 7^{7}
(Japan) H Kaji | 7^{7} | 1 | 6^{5}

Semifinals
(Australia) E Perez | 6 | 6
WC | (Australia) N Bains | 2 | 3
