= 2018 Darwin Tennis International – Women's doubles =

Women's doubles
- 2018 Darwin Tennis International

Final
- Champions: (India) Rutuja Bhosale (Japan) Hiroko Kuwata
- Runners-up: (Australia) Kimberly Birrell (United Kingdom) Katy Dunne
- Score: 6–2, 6–4

Events
Singles	men	women
Doubles	men	women
← 2011 ·	Darwin Tennis International	· 2019 →

Maria Fernanda Alves and Samantha Murray were the defending champions having won the previous edition in 2011, however both players chose not to participate.

Rutuja Bhosale and Hiroko Kuwata won the title, defeating Kimberly Birrell and Katy Dunne in the final, 6–2, 6–4.

== Seeds ==
1. (Australia) Ellen Perez / (New Zealand) Erin Routliffe (quarterfinals)
2. (Australia) Alison Bai / (Papua New Guinea) Abigail Tere-Apisah (quarterfinals)
3. (Australia) Naiktha Bains / (China) Xu Shilin (quarterfinals)
4. (India) Rutuja Bhosale / (Japan) Hiroko Kuwata (champions)

== Draw ==
=== Key ===
- Q = Qualifier
- WC = Wild card
- LL = Lucky loser
- Alt = Alternate
- SE = Special exempt
- PR = Protected ranking
- ITF = ITF entry
- JE = Junior exempt
- w/o = Walkover
- r = Retired
- d = Defaulted
- SR = Special ranking

=== Draw ===
First round
1	(Australia) E Perez (New Zealand) E Routliffe	6	6
(Hungary) D Gálfi (Australia) O Rogowska	1	2
(Indonesia) A Sutjiadi (Australia) O Tjandramulia	6	6
(Italy) G Brescia (Japan) E Sema	4	2
4	(India) R Bhosale (Japan) H Kuwata	6	1	[10]
WC	(Australia) G Da Silva-Fick (Australia) S Tomic	4	6	[7]
(United States) YK Chiang (Japan) H Kaji	2	2
Q	(United Kingdom) JA Burrage (United Kingdom) F Christie	6	6
(Australia) K Birrell (United Kingdom) K Dunne	4	6	[10]
(Japan) M Ayukawa (Japan) R Ueda	6	2	[1]
WC	(Australia) D Aiava (Australia) A Bozovic	3	4
3	(Australia) N Bains (China) S Xu	6	6
Q	(Japan) M Uchijima (Hong Kong) L Zhang	3	6^{3}
WC	(Australia) J Fourlis (Australia) S Harris	6	7^{7}
(Japan) M Minokoshi (Japan) K Okamura	1	3
2	(Australia) A Bai (Papua New Guinea) A Tere-Apisah	6	6

Quarterfinals
1	(Australia) E Perez (New Zealand) E Routliffe	6	3	[5]
(Indonesia) A Sutjiadi (Australia) O Tjandramulia	4	6	[10]
4	(India) R Bhosale (Japan) H Kuwata	1	6	[10]
Q	(United Kingdom) JA Burrage (United Kingdom) F Christie	6	2	[7]
(Australia) K Birrell (United Kingdom) K Dunne	1	6	[10]
3	(Australia) N Bains (China) S Xu	6	3	[4]
WC	(Australia) J Fourlis (Australia) S Harris	6	6
2	(Australia) A Bai (Papua New Guinea) A Tere-Apisah	3	2

Semifinals
(Indonesia) A Sutjiadi (Australia) O Tjandramulia	0	6^{5}
4	(India) R Bhosale (Japan) H Kuwata	6	7^{7}
(Australia) K Birrell (United Kingdom) K Dunne	7^{7}	6
WC	(Australia) J Fourlis (Australia) S Harris	6^{3}	3

Final
4	(India) R Bhosale (Japan) H Kuwata	6	6
(Australia) K Birrell (United Kingdom) K Dunne	2	4
