= 2019 Darwin Tennis International =

- Date: 23–29 September 2019
- Edition: 6th
- Category: ITF Women's World Tennis Tour; ITF Men's World Tennis Tour
- Prize money: $60,000 (women) $25,000 (men)
- Surface: Hard
- Location: Darwin, Australia

Champions

Men's singles
- (Australia) Blake Mott

Women's singles
- (Australia) Lizette Cabrera

Men's doubles
- (Australia) Dayne Kelly / (United Kingdom) Brydan Klein

Women's doubles
- (Australia) Destanee Aiava / (Australia) Lizette Cabrera
- Darwin Tennis International

The 2019 Darwin Tennis International was a professional tennis tournament played on outdoor hard courts. It was the sixth edition of the tournament which was part of the 2019 ITF Women's World Tennis Tour and the 2019 ITF Men's World Tennis Tour. It took place in Darwin, Australia between 23 and 29 September 2019.

== Women's singles main-draw entrants ==
=== Seeds ===
Country	Player	Rank^{1}	Seed
AUS	Zoe Hives	150	1
AUS	Lizette Cabrera	177	2
AUS	Maddison Inglis	189	3
AUS	Destanee Aiava	190	4
AUS	Kaylah McPhee	199	5
CHN	Xu Shilin	203	6
JPN	Ayano Shimizu	254	7
GBR	Naiktha Bains	256	8

- ^{1} Rankings are as of 16 September 2019.

=== Other entrants ===
The following players received wildcards into the singles main draw:

- (Australia) Alison Bai
- (Australia) Alexandra Bozovic
- (Australia) Gabriella Da Silva-Fick
- (Australia) Ivana Popovic

The following players received entry from the qualifying draw:

- (Japan) Haruna Arakawa
- (United States) Jennifer Elie
- (Japan) Nagi Hanatani
- (Belgium) Magali Kempen
- (Australia) Amber Marshall
- (Australia) Alexandra Osborne
- (Japan) Michika Ozeki
- (Hong Kong) Wu Ho-ching

== Men's singles main-draw entrants ==
=== Seeds ===
Country	Player	Rank^{1}	Seed
CHI	Marcelo Tomás Barrios Vera	293	1
AUS	Maverick Banes	325	2
GBR	Brydan Klein	346	3
UKR	Vladyslav Orlov	475	4
TPE	Hsu Yu-hsiou	490	5
AUS	Dayne Kelly	501	6
AUS	Matthew Romios	565	7
TPE	Lee Kuan-yi	573	8

- ^{1} Rankings are as of 16 September 2019.

=== Other entrants ===
The following players received wildcards into the singles main draw:

- (Australia) Jai Corbett
- (Australia) James Ibrahim
- (Australia) Blake Mott
- (Australia) Tristan Schoolkate

The following players received entry from the qualifying draw:

- (Philippines) Francis Alcantara
- (Australia) Jesse Delaney
- (Costa Rica) Jesse Flores
- (Thailand) Worovin Kumthonkittikul
- (Australia) Will Maher
- (Australia) Benard Bruno Nkomba

The following player received entry as a lucky loser:

- (Australia) Moerani Bouzige
- (Australia) Jake Delaney

== Champions ==
=== Women's singles ===
- (Australia) Lizette Cabrera def. (Australia) Abbie Myers, 6–4, 4–6, 6–2

=== Men's singles ===
- (Australia) Blake Mott def. (Australia) Calum Puttergill, 6–1, 6–4

=== Women's doubles ===
- (Australia) Destanee Aiava / (Australia) Lizette Cabrera def. (Australia) Alison Bai / (Australia) Jaimee Fourlis, 6–4, 2–6, [10–3]

=== Men's doubles ===
- (Australia) Dayne Kelly / (United Kingdom) Brydan Klein def. (Australia) Thomas Fancutt / (Australia) Matthew Romios, 7–5, 7–5
