= Darwin Tennis International =

Tournament information
- Event name: Darwin Tennis International
- Location: Darwin, Australia
- Venue: Darwin International Tennis Centre
- Surface: Hard
ATP Tour
- Category: ITF Men's Circuit
- Draw: 32S / 64Q / 16D
- Prize money: $25,000
WTA Tour
- Category: ITF Women's Circuit
- Draw: 32S / 32Q / 16D
- Prize money: $25,000

The Darwin Tennis International is a professional tennis tournament played on outdoor hard courts. It is currently part of the International Tennis Federation (ITF) Men's Circuit and Women's Circuit. It has been held in City of Darwin, Australia since 2009. The tournament was revived in 2018, having not been held since 2011.

== Past finals ==
=== Men's singles ===
Year	Champion	Runner-up	Score
2024 (2)	(Australia) Omar Jasika	(New Zealand) James Watt	1–6, 6–3, 6–4
2024 (1)	(Australia) Omar Jasika	(Australia) Jake Delaney	7–5, 7–5
2023 (2)	(Australia) Blake Mott	(Australia) Jake Delaney	6–2, 2–6, 6–3
2023 (1)	(Australia) Blake Mott	(Australia) Blake Ellis	6–4, 6–1
2022 (2)	(Australia) Dane Sweeny	(Australia) Omar Jasika	6–3, 6–7^{(4–7)}, 6–4
2022 (1)	(Australia) Dane Sweeny	(United States) Kyle Seelig	4–6, 6–2, 6–1
2020–21	Tournament cancelled due to the COVID-19 pandemic		
2019	(Australia) Blake Mott	(Australia) Calum Puttergill	6–1, 6–4
2018	(Japan) Yuta Shimizu	(United Kingdom) Evan Hoyt	7–6^{(8–6)}, 3–6, 6–4
2012–17	Not held		
2011	(Australia) Isaac Frost	(Australia) Nick Lindahl	6–1, 4–6, 6–4
2010	(Australia) John Millman	(Japan) Hiroki Moriya	6–0, 6–1
2009^{(2)}	(United Kingdom) Jamie Baker	(Australia) John Millman	6–4, 2–6, 6–3
2009^{(1)}	(Australia) Dayne Kelly	(United Kingdom) Jamie Baker	6–4, 6–4

=== Women's singles ===
Year	Champion	Runner-up	Score
2025 (2)	(South Korea) Jeong Bo-young	(Australia) Elena Micic	6–2, 7–5
2025 (1)	(Australia) Taylah Preston	(Japan) Shiho Akita	7–6^{(7–3)}, 6–3
2023-24	Not held		
2022 (2)	(Australia) Alexandra Bozovic	(Australia) Talia Gibson	3–6, 6–3, 6–3
2022 (1)	(Australia) Alexandra Bozovic	(Australia) Destanee Aiava	6–1, 6–4
2020–21	Tournament cancelled due to the COVID-19 pandemic		
2019	(Australia) Lizette Cabrera	(Australia) Abbie Myers	6–4, 4–6, 6–2
2018	(Australia) Kimberly Birrell	(Australia) Ellen Perez	6–3, 6–3
2012–17	Not held		
2011	(Australia) Casey Dellacqua	(Japan) Akiko Omae	6–1, 6–2
2010	(Australia) Olivia Rogowska	(United Kingdom) Naomi Cavaday	6–2, 2–6, 6–0
2009^{(2)}	(New Zealand) Sacha Jones	(Australia) Bojana Bobusic	6–4, 6–1
2009^{(1)}	(Australia) Alicia Molik	(Australia) Sally Peers	6–3, 6–4

=== Men's doubles ===
Year	Champions	Runners-up	Score
2024 (2)	(Australia) Jake Delaney (Australia) Jesse Delaney	(Australia) Matt Hulme (New Zealand) James Watt	6–4, 6–4
2024 (1)	(Australia) Joshua Charlton (Australia) Jake Delaney	(Australia) Matt Hulme (New Zealand) James Watt	6–3, 6–4
2023 (2)	(Australia) Thomas Fancutt (New Zealand) Ajeet Rai	(Australia) Blake Bayldon (Australia) Brandon Walkin	6–1, 6–4
2023 (1)	(Australia) Jeremy Beale (Australia) Thomas Fancutt	(Australia) Joshua Charlton (Australia) Blake Ellis	6–4, 6–4
2022 (2)	(United States) Kyle Seelig (Northern Mariana Islands) Colin Sinclair	(Australia) Tai Sach (Australia) Zaharije-Zak Talic	6–4, 6–4
2022 (1)	(Australia) Calum Puttergill (Australia) Dane Sweeny	(Australia) Joshua Charlton (Australia) Adam Walton	7–6^{(7–5)}, 6–3
2020–21	Tournament cancelled due to the COVID-19 pandemic		
2019	(Australia) Dayne Kelly (United Kingdom) Brydan Klein	(Australia) Thomas Fancutt (Australia) Matthew Romios	7–5, 7–5
2018	(Australia) Jeremy Beale (Australia) Thomas Fancutt	(United Kingdom) Brydan Klein (Australia) Scott Puodziunas	7–6^{(7–4)}, 6–3
2012–17	Not held		
2011	(Australia) Michael Look (United States) Nicolas Meister	(China) Gao Peng (China) Gao Wan	6–4, 6–4
2010	(Australia) Colin Ebelthite (Australia) Adam Feeney	(China) Chang Yu (China) Xu Junchao	6–2, 6–2
2009^{(2)}	(Australia) Kaden Hensel (Australia) Adam Hubble	(China) Li Zhe (China) Wang Yu Jr.	6–4, 6–3
2009^{(1)}	(Australia) Matthew Ebden (Australia) Sadik Kadir	(United Kingdom) Jamie Baker (Australia) Dane Propoggia	6–4, 7–5

=== Women's doubles ===
Year	Champions	Runners-up	Score
2025 (2)	(United Kingdom) Brooke Black (Japan) Reina Goto	(Australia) Elicia Kim (Australia) Jizelle Sibai	6–3, 6–2
2025 (1)	(New Zealand) Monique Barry (Australia) Gabriella Da Silva-Fick	(United Kingdom) Brooke Black (Japan) Reina Goto	6–3, 7–6^{(9–7)}
2023–24	Not held		
2022 (2)	(Australia) Talia Gibson (Australia) Petra Hule	(Australia) Lisa Mays (Japan) Ramu Ueda	2–6, 7–5, [10–5]
2022 (1)	(Japan) Momoko Kobori (Thailand) Luksika Kumkhum	(Japan) Yui Chikaraishi (Japan) Nanari Katsumi	6–2, 7–6^{(7–3)}
2020–21	Tournament cancelled due to the COVID-19 pandemic		
2019	(Australia) Destanee Aiava (Australia) Lizette Cabrera	(Australia) Alison Bai (Australia) Jaimee Fourlis	6–4, 2–6, [10–3]
2018	(India) Rutuja Bhosale (Japan) Hiroko Kuwata	(Australia) Kimberly Birrell (United Kingdom) Katy Dunne	6–2, 6–4
2012–17	Not held		
2011	(Brazil) Maria Fernanda Alves (United Kingdom) Samantha Murray	(Australia) Stephanie Bengson (Australia) Tyra Calderwood	6–4, 6–2
2010	(Japan) Kumiko Iijima (Japan) Yurika Sema	(Australia) Alenka Hubacek (Australia) Tammi Patterson	6–4, 6–1
2009^{(2)}	(Australia) Isabella Holland (Australia) Sally Peers	(Australia) Alenka Hubacek (Indonesia) Jessy Rompies	6–4, 3–6, [10–4]
2009^{(1)}	(Australia) Nicole Kriz (Australia) Alicia Molik	(Australia) Tyra Calderwood (Australia) Olivia Rogowska	6–3, 6–4
