= 2019 Darwin Tennis International – Women's doubles =

Women's doubles
- 2019 Darwin Tennis International

Final
- Champions: (Australia) Destanee Aiava (Australia) Lizette Cabrera
- Runners-up: (Australia) Alison Bai (Australia) Jaimee Fourlis
- Score: 6–4, 2–6, [10–3]

Events
Singles	men	women
Doubles	men	women
← 2018 ·	Darwin Tennis International	· 2020 →

Rutuja Bhosale and Hiroko Kuwata were the defending champions, but chose not to participate.

Destanee Aiava and Lizette Cabrera won the title, defeating Alison Bai and Jaimee Fourlis in the final, 6–4, 2–6, [10–3].

== Seeds ==
1. (United Kingdom) Naiktha Bains / (United States) Asia Muhammad (quarterfinals)
2. (Australia) Alison Bai / (Australia) Jaimee Fourlis (final)
3. (Japan) Haruna Arakawa / (Chinese Taipei) Hsu Chieh-yu (semifinals)
4. (New Zealand) Paige Hourigan / (Australia) Belinda Woolcock (first round)

== Draw ==
=== Key ===
- Q = Qualifier
- WC = Wild card
- LL = Lucky loser
- Alt = Alternate
- SE = Special exempt
- PR = Protected ranking
- ITF = ITF entry
- JE = Junior exempt
- w/o = Walkover
- r = Retired
- d = Defaulted
- SR = Special ranking

=== Draw ===
First round
1	(United Kingdom) N Bains (United States) A Muhammad	6	6
(New Zealand) E Fanning (Australia) A Myers	0	2
WC	(Australia) I Bozicevic (Australia) A Osborne	6^{3}	3
(Australia) D Aiava (Australia) L Cabrera	7^{7}	6
4	(New Zealand) P Hourigan (Australia) B Woolcock	2	6^{3}
(Australia) M Inglis (Australia) K McPhee	6	7^{7}
(Australia) A Parnaby (Australia) A Smith	7	3	[7]
(Japan) M Ozeki (Japan) E Sema	5	6	[10]
(Australia) G Da Silva-Fick (Belgium) M Kempen	6	6
(Slovakia) T Mihalíková (Australia) O Rogowska	3	3
WC	(Australia) A Bozovic (Australia) S Tomic	1	2
3	(Japan) H Arakawa (Chinese Taipei) C-y Hsu	6	6
(Japan) M Kobori (Japan) A Shimizu	0	3
(Japan) M Imanishi (Japan) R Kajitani	6	6
(Japan) M Minokoshi (Japan) R Ueda	3	5
2	(Australia) A Bai (Australia) J Fourlis	6	7

Quarterfinals
1	(United Kingdom) N Bains (United States) A Muhammad	5	4
(Australia) D Aiava (Australia) L Cabrera	7	6
(Australia) M Inglis (Australia) K McPhee	7^{7}	6
(Japan) M Ozeki (Japan) E Sema	6^{0}	3
(Australia) G Da Silva-Fick (Belgium) M Kempen	6	5	[5]
3	(Japan) H Arakawa (Chinese Taipei) C-y Hsu	3	7	[10]
(Japan) M Imanishi (Japan) R Kajitani	4	1
2	(Australia) A Bai (Australia) J Fourlis	6	6

Semifinals
(Australia) D Aiava (Australia) L Cabrera	3	7	[12]
(Australia) M Inglis (Australia) K McPhee	6	5	[10]
3	(Japan) H Arakawa (Chinese Taipei) C-y Hsu	6	3	[5]
2	(Australia) A Bai (Australia) J Fourlis	4	6	[10]

Final
(Australia) D Aiava (Australia) L Cabrera	6	2	[10]
2	(Australia) A Bai (Australia) J Fourlis	4	6	[3]
