= Lizette Cabrera =

Australian tennis player

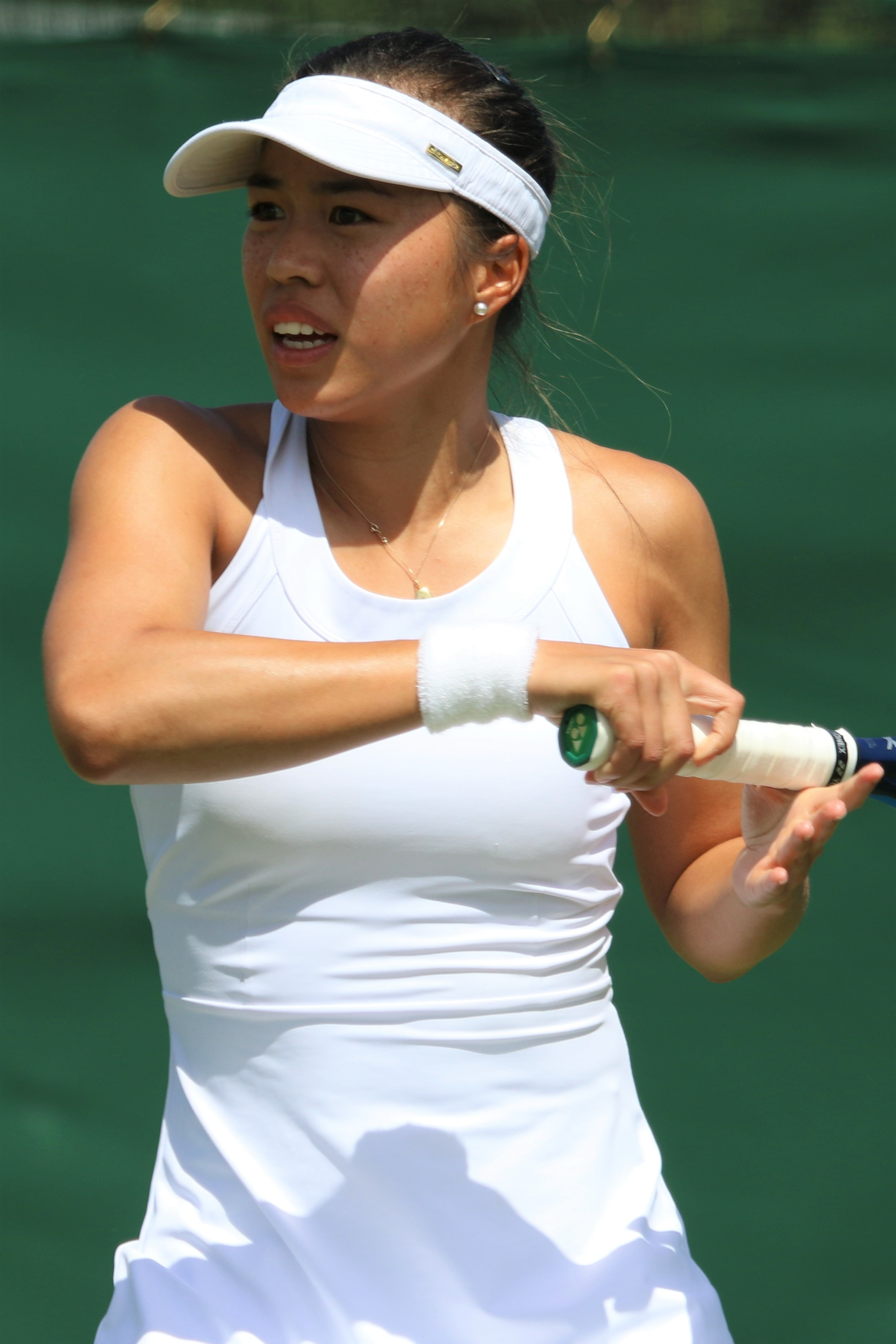
- Cabrera at the 2022 Wimbledon Championships
- Full name: Lizette Faith Cabrera
- Country (sports): Australia
- Residence: Brisbane, Queensland
- Born: 19 December 1997 (age 28) Townsville, Queensland
- Height: 1.68 m (5 ft 6 in)
- Plays: Right (two-handed backhand)
- Coach: Goran Marijan
- Prize money: $1,280,617

Singles
- Career record: 323–274
- Career titles: 12 ITF
- Highest ranking: No. 119 (3 February 2020)
- Current ranking: No. 300 (3 August 2026)

Grand Slam singles results
- Australian Open: 1R (2017, 2018, 2020, 2021)
- French Open: Q2 (2018, 2022)
- Wimbledon: Q2 (2017, 2018, 2022)
- US Open: 1R (2018, 2020)

Doubles
- Career record: 122–131
- Career titles: 7 ITF
- Highest ranking: No. 139 (16 July 2018)
- Current ranking: No. 409 (3 August 2026)

Grand Slam doubles results
- Australian Open: 2R (2021, 2022, 2026)

Grand Slam mixed doubles results
- Australian Open: QF (2023)
- Last updated on: 13 August 2026.

Lizette Faith Cabrera (born 19 December 1997) is an Australian tennis player of Filipino descent. She has a career-high singles ranking of 119 by the WTA, achieved on 3 February 2020. On 16 July 2018, she peaked at No. 139 in the WTA doubles rankings.

== Early life ==
Cabrera was born and raised in Townsville by her Filipino parents Ronnie and Maria, and she moved to Brisbane at the age of 13 to train at the National Academy. She has one sister, Izabo, and one brother, Carl. Cabrera's parents and both work in an abattoir to financially support her career.

== Career ==
=== 2016 ===
Cabrera started 2016 with a ranking of 1062. She won her first title on the professional tour in September 2016. Her year-end singles ranking was No. 257.

=== 2017 ===
Cabrera was given a wildcard into the Hobart International and won her first WTA Tour match against Misaki Doi in round one. At the Australian Open, Cabrera made her major main-draw debut thanks to a wildcard; however, she lost in the first round to Donna Vekić. In September, Cabrera qualified for and made the quarterfinals of the Guangzhou International, defeating world No. 30 Anett Kontaveit in the second round. She ended 2017 with a singles rank of 135.

=== 2018 ===
Cabrera lost to Beatriz Haddad Maia in round one of the Hobart International and the Australian Open the following week. In March, she reached the quarterfinal of the Clay Court International. In April, Cabrera qualified for the WTA Tour event Copa Colsanitas. In May, she reached the second round of qualifying for the French Open and in June, the second round of qualifying to Wimbledon. Cabrera made her US Open main-draw debut after winning a wildcard. She lost to Ajla Tomljanović in the first round, and ended season with a singles rank of 230.

=== 2019 ===
Cabrera failed to qualify for the Brisbane International and Australian Open but then reached the quarterfinal of the Burnie International. In March, she played in the ITF Circuit across the U.S., with limited success, before travelling to Europe in May. She won a doubles title in Caserta, Italy with Julia Grabher and reached the quarterfinals of the Manchester Trophy, losing to eventual champion Magda Linette.

In July, Cabrera won the Challenger de Granby in Canada; this was her first title in three years and biggest to date. Her ranking improved to back inside the world's top 200. At the US Open, Cabrera lost in the final round of qualifying. In September, she returned to Australia and won the singles and doubles at the Darwin International. In October, she won the Bendigo International and reached the final of the Playford International the following week. These results led Cabrera to a career-high singles ranking of 131, and so she finished the year.

=== 2020 ===
Cabrera commenced new season with her first tour quarterfinal since 2017 at the Hobart International but lost to Elena Rybakina. She also lost in the first round of the Australian Open, before she reached the quarterfinals of the Burnie International. After these results, she reached a new career-high singles ranking of 119, on 3 February 2020.

=== 2022 ===
Cabrera reached the second round of qualifying at the Australian Open. In June, she won the doubles title at the Ilkley Trophy with Jang Su-jeong, the biggest doubles title of her career. In October, she won the W25 singles title in Cairns, her first singles title since 2019.

=== 2023 ===
Cabrera played the mixed doubles at the Australian Open with John-Patrick Smith after the pair received a wildcard. They beat Gabriela Dabrowski and Max Purcell in the second round to reach the quarterfinals, where they lost to Luisa Stefani and Rafael Matos. This was Cabrera's best result at a major. In June, she won the W25 singles title in Tauste, Spain.

=== 2024 ===
Cabrera reached three ITF singles finals during the year, in Cairns, Brisbane and on the Gold Coast, but lost all three. In the Gold Coast International final, she lost to Daria Saville. She won two ITF doubles titles, including the NSW Open with Taylah Preston.

=== 2025 ===
Cabrera won three W35 singles titles in Australia. She won the Launceston International in February, then titles in Mildura and Swan Hill in March. She also won the Mildura doubles title with Gabriella Da Silva-Fick. She entered qualifying at all four majors without reaching a main draw. In June, she qualified for the Birmingham Classic, her first tour-level main draw since 2022, and lost in the first round to Zeynep Sönmez.

=== 2026 ===
Cabrera received a wildcard into Australian Open qualifying. She beat Gabriela Knutson in the first round and lost to Linda Klimovičová in the second. She also reached the second round of the women's doubles. On the ITF Circuit, she won W35 singles titles at the Burnie International in February and the Launceston International in March.

== Performance timeline ==
Key
W	F	SF	QF	#R	RR	Q#	P#	DNQ	A	Z#	PO	G	S	B	NMS	NTI	P	NH

(W) winner; (F) finalist; (SF) semifinalist; (QF) quarterfinalist; (#R) rounds 4, 3, 2, 1; (RR) round-robin stage; (Q#) qualification round; (P#) preliminary round; (DNQ) did not qualify; (A) absent; (Z#) Davis/Fed Cup Zonal Group (with number indication) or (PO) play-off; (G) gold, (S) silver or (B) bronze Olympic/Paralympic medal; (NMS) not a Masters tournament; (NTI) not a Tier I tournament; (P) postponed; (NH) not held; (SR) strike rate (events won / competed); (W–L) win–loss record.
To avoid confusion and double counting, these charts are updated at the conclusion of a tournament or when the player's participation has ended.

Only main-draw results in WTA Tour, Grand Slam tournaments, Fed Cup/Billie Jean King Cup and Olympic Games are included in win–loss records.

=== Singles ===
Current through the 2026 Wimbledon Championships.

Tournament	2017	2018	2019	2020	2021	2022	2023	2024	2025	2026	SR	W–L
Australian Open	1R	1R	Q2	1R	1R	Q2	Q1	A	Q1	Q2	0 / 4	0–4
French Open	Q1	Q2	A	A	Q1	Q2	A	A	Q1	A	0 / 0	0–0
Wimbledon	Q2	Q2	A	NH	Q1	Q2	A	A	Q1	A	0 / 0	0–0
US Open	Q2	1R	Q3	1R	Q1	Q2	A	A	Q2	A	0 / 2	0–2
Win–loss	0–1	0–2	0–0	0–2	0–1	0–0	0–0	0–0	0–0	0–0	0 / 6	0–6
Career statistics
Tournaments	5	6	0	3	7	2	0	0	1	0	Career total: 24	
Overall win–loss	4–5	0–6	0–0	2–3	1–7	0–2	0–0	0–0	0–1	0–0	0 / 24	7–24
Year-end ranking	135	230	131	140	172	296	281	428	229		$1,280,617	

== ITF Circuit finals ==
=== Singles: 19 (12 titles, 7 runner-ups) ===
Legend W80 tournaments (1–0) $50/60,000 tournaments (2–3) W40/50 tournaments (0–1) W25/35 tournaments (9–3)	Finals by surface Hard (10–6) Carpet (0–1) Grass (2–0)

Result	W–L	Date	Tournament	Tier	Surface	Opponent	Score
Win	1–0	Sep 2016	ITF Tweed Heads, Australia	25,000	Hard	(Australia) Destanee Aiava	6–3, 5–7, 6–2
Win	2–0	Oct 2016	ITF Brisbane, Australia	25,000	Hard	(Slovakia) Viktória Kužmová	6–2, 6–4
Loss	2–1	Nov 2016	Toyota World Challenge, Japan	50,000	Carpet (i)	(Belarus) Aryna Sabalenka	2–6, 4–6
Win	3–1	Jul 2019	Challenger de Granby, Canada	W80	Hard	(Canada) Leylah Fernandez	6–1, 6–4
Win	4–1	Sep 2019	Darwin International, Australia	W60	Hard	(Australia) Abbie Myers	6–4, 4–6, 6–2
Win	5–1	Oct 2019	Bendigo International, Australia	W60	Hard	(Australia) Maddison Inglis	6–2, 6–3
Loss	5–2	Nov 2019	Playford International, Australia	W60	Hard	(Australia) Storm Sanders	3–6, 4–6
Win	6–2	Oct 2022	ITF Cairns, Australia	W25	Hard	(United Kingdom) Naiktha Bains	5–7, 6–3, 6–2
Loss	6–3	Nov 2022	ITF Traralgon, Australia	W25	Hard	(Australia) Destanee Aiava	3–6, 7–6^{(4)}, 4–6
Win	7–3	Jun 2023	ITF Tauste, Spain	W25+H	Hard	(Spain) Rosa Vicens Mas	6–1, 6–3
Loss	7–4	Oct 2023	ITF Cairns, Australia	W25	Hard	(Australia) Destanee Aiava	walkover
Loss	7–5	Sep 2024	ITF Cairns, Australia	W25	Hard	(Australia) Talia Gibson	2–6, 6–7^{(2)}
Loss	7–6	Nov 2024	Brisbane QTC International, Australia	W50	Hard	(Australia) Destanee Aiava	6–7^{(4)}, 6–4, 3–6
Loss	7–7	Nov 2024	Gold Coast International, Australia	W75	Hard	(Australia) Daria Saville	5–7, 6–7^{(3)}
Win	8–7	Feb 2025	Launceston International, Australia	W35	Hard	(Japan) Sakura Hosogi	7–5, 6–2
Win	9–7	Mar 2025	ITF Mildura, Australia	W35	Grass	(Japan) Chihiro Muramatsu	6–0, 7–5
Win	10–7	Mar 2025	ITF Swan Hill, Australia	W35	Grass	(Japan) Sakura Hosogi	6–4, 6–3
Win	11–7	Feb 2026	Burnie International, Australia	W35	Hard	(India) Vaidehi Chaudhari	6–2, 6–3
Win	12–7	Mar 2026	Launceston International, Australia	W35	Hard	(China) Yuan Chengyiyi	3–6, 7–6^{(6)}, 6–2

=== Doubles: 17 (8 titles, 9 runner-ups) ===
Legend W100 tournaments (1–0) W80 tournaments (0–1) W60/75 tournaments (2–4) W25/35 tournaments (5–3) W15 tournaments (0–1)	Finals by surface Hard (5–7) Clay (1–2) Grass (2–0)

Result	W–L	Date	Tournament	Tier	Surface	Partner	Opponents	Score
Loss	0–1	Oct 2014	ITF Toowoomba, Australia	15k	Hard	(Australia) Priscilla Hon	(Australia) Jessica Moore (Australia) Abbie Myers	3–6, 3–6
Loss	0–2	Jun 2016	ITF Tokyo, Japan	25k	Hard	(Japan) Miharu Imanishi	(Japan) Kanae Hisami (Japan) Kotomi Takahata	1–6, 4–6
Win	1–2	Oct 2016	ITF Cairns, Australia	25k	Hard	(Australia) Alison Bai	(Poland) Katarzyna Kawa (Poland) Sandra Zaniewska	7–5, 5–7, [12–10]
Loss	1–3	Nov 2016	Canberra International, Australia	60k	Hard	(Australia) Alison Bai	(Australia) Jessica Moore (Australia) Storm Sanders	3–6, 4–6
Loss	1–4	Apr 2017	Dothan Pro Classic, United States	60k	Clay	(United States) Kristie Ahn	(United States) Emina Bektas (United States) Sanaz Marand	3–6, 6–1, [2–10]
Loss	1–5	Apr 2019	Clay Court Championships, US	W80	Clay	(Uzbekistan) Akgul Amanmuradova	(United States) Quinn Gleason (United States) Ingrid Neel	7–5, 5–7, [8–10]
Win	2–5	May 2019	ITF Caserta, Italy	W25	Clay	(Austria) Julia Grabher	(Romania) Elena Bogdan (Slovakia) Vivien Juhaszová	6–3, 6–4
Win	3–5	Sep 2019	Darwin International, Australia	W60	Hard	(Australia) Destanee Aiava	(Australia) Alison Bai (Australia) Jaimee Fourlis	6–4, 2–6, [10–3]
Win	4–5	Jun 2022	Ilkley Trophy, UK	W100	Grass	(South Korea) Jang Su-jeong	(United Kingdom) Naiktha Bains (United Kingdom) Maia Lumsden	6–7^{(7)}, 6–0, [11–9]
Loss	4–6	Oct 2023	ITF Cairns, Australia	W25	Hard	(Australia) Maddison Inglis	(Japan) Yuki Naito (Japan) Naho Sato	6–4, 3–6, [2–10]
Loss	4–7	Apr 2024	ITF Osaka, Japan	W35	Hard	(United States) Dalayna Hewitt	(Japan) Natsuho Arakawa (Japan) Miho Kuramochi	4–6, 6–3, [7–10]
Win	5–7	Aug 2024	ITF Roehampton, UK	W35	Hard	(Uzbekistan) Nigina Abduraimova	(Japan) Akiko Omae (Japan) Eri Shimizu	6–2, 6–2
Loss	5–8	Oct 2024	Playford International, Australia	W75	Hard	(Australia) Taylah Preston	(Australia) Alexandra Bozovic (Australia) Petra Hule	4–6, 3–6
Win	6–8	Oct 2024	Sydney Open, Australia	W75	Hard	(Australia) Taylah Preston	(Australia) Destanee Aiava (Australia) Maddison Inglis	6–1, 3–6, [10–8]
Loss	6–9	Jan 2025	Brisbane QTC International, Australia	W75	Hard	(Australia) Taylah Preston	(Australia) Petra Hule (Australia) Elena Micic	6–2, 2–6, [6–10]
Win	7–9	Mar 2025	ITF Mildura, Australia	W35	Grass	(Australia) Gabriella Da Silva-Fick	(Australia) Alicia Smith (Australia) Belle Thompson	2–6, 6–3, [12–10]
Win	8–9	Oct 2026	ITF Birmingham, UK	W35	Hard (i)	(United Kingdom) Jodie Burrage	(United Kingdom) Victoria Allen (Netherlands) Stéphanie Visscher	6–4, 7–5
