= 2018 ITF Men's Circuit =

Tennis tournament series

Details
- Duration: 1 January – 30 December 2018
- Edition: 21st
- Tournaments: 572
- Categories: $25,000 tournaments (156) $15,000 tournaments (416)

Achievements (singles)
- Most titles: (France) Baptiste Crepatte (Germany) Peter Heller (Russia) Ivan Nedelko (Spain) David Pérez Sanz (Spain) Oriol Roca Batalla (6)
- Most finals: (Spain) David Pérez Sanz (10)

The 2018 ITF Men's Circuit is the 2018 edition of the second-tier tour for men's professional tennis. It is organised by the International Tennis Federation and is a tier below the ATP Tour. The ITF Men's Circuit includes tournaments with prize money ranging from $15,000 up to $25,000.

== Participating host nations ==
- Argentina (ARG)
- Australia (AUS)
- Austria (AUT)
- Bahrain (BHR)
- Belarus (BLR)
- Belgium (BEL)
- Bolivia (BOL)
- Bosnia and Herzegovina (BIH)
- Brazil (BRA)
- Bulgaria (BUL)
- Cameroon (CMR)
- Canada (CAN)
- Chile (CHI)
- China (CHN)
- Chinese Taipei (TPE)
- Croatia (CRO)
- Czech Republic (CZE)
- Dominican Republic (DOM)
- Ecuador (ECU)
- Egypt (EGY)
- Estonia (EST)
- Finland (FIN)
- France (FRA)
- Georgia (GEO)
- Germany (GER)
- Great Britain (GBR)
- Greece (GRE)
- Guam (GUM)
- Hong Kong (HKG)
- Hungary (HUN)
- India (IND)
- Indonesia (INA)
- Ireland (IRL)
- Israel (ISR)
- Italy (ITA)
- Japan (JPN)
- Kazakhstan (KAZ)
- Kuwait (KUW)
- Latvia (LAT)
- Lebanon (LBN)
- Lithuania (LTU)
- Malaysia (MAS)
- Mexico (MEX)
- Morocco (MAR)
- Mozambique (MOZ)
- Netherlands (NED)
- Nigeria (NGR)
- Pakistan (PAK)
- Panama (PAN)
- Peru (PER)
- Poland (POL)
- Portugal (POR)
- Qatar (QAT)
- Romania (ROU)
- Russia (RUS)
- Serbia (SRB)
- Singapore (SGP)
- Slovakia (SVK)
- South Africa (RSA)
- South Korea (KOR)
- Spain (ESP)
- Sri Lanka (SRI)
- Sweden (SWE)
- Switzerland (SUI)
- Thailand (THA)
- Tunisia (TUN)
- Turkey (TUR)
- Uganda (UGA)
- Ukraine (UKR)
- United States (USA)
- Uzbekistan (UZB)
- Vietnam (VIE)
- Zimbabwe (ZIM)

== Tournament breakdown by event category ==
Event category	Number of events	Total prize money
$25,000	156	$3,900,000
$15,000	416	$6,240,000
Total	572	$10,150,000

== Point distribution ==
Tournament Category	W	F	SF	QF	R16	R32
Futures $25,000+H	35	20	10	4	1	0
Futures $25,000	27	15	8	3	1	0
Futures $15,000	18	10	6	2	1	0

== Statistics ==
These tables present the number of singles (S) and doubles (D) titles won by each player and each nation during the season. The players/nations are sorted by: 1) total number of titles (a doubles title won by two players representing the same nation counts as only one win for the nation); 2) a singles > doubles hierarchy; 3) alphabetical order (by family names for players).

To avoid confusion and double counting, these tables should be updated only after an event is completed.

=== Titles won by player ===
Updated as of December 31

Total	Player	$25K		$15K		Total	
Total	Player	S	D	S	D	S	D
15	David Pérez Sanz (ESP)			6	9	6	9
11	Fred Gil (POR)		1	3	7	3	8
10	Oriol Roca Batalla (ESP)		1	6	3	6	4
9	Peter Heller (GER)	1		5	3	6	3
9	Maxime Cressy (USA)	1	7		1	1	8
9	Jeroen Vanneste (BEL)		1	1	7	1	8
9	Wilfredo González (GUA)		4		5	0	9
8	Javier Barranco Cosano (ESP)	3	2	1	2	4	4
8	Benjamin Lock (ZIM)		1	2	5	2	6
8	Matías Zukas (ARG)			2	6	2	6
8	Patrik Niklas-Salminen (FIN)	1	3		4	1	7
8	Juan Ignacio Galarza (ARG)		2	1	5	1	7
8	Mariano Kestelboim (ARG)		1	1	6	1	7
8	Hugo Voljacques (FRA)		2		6	0	8
8	Dan Added (FRA)		1		7	0	8
7	Baptiste Crepatte (FRA)	1		5	1	6	1
7	Lucas Miedler (AUT)	1		3	3	4	3
7	Matías Franco Descotte (ARG)		1	4	2	4	3
7	Evgenii Tiurnev (RUS)		1	3	3	3	4
7	Aziz Dougaz (TUN)	1	2	1	3	2	5
7	Orlando Luz (BRA)	1	2	1	3	2	5
7	Harri Heliövaara (FIN)		3	2	2	2	5
7	Shintaro Imai (JPN)		2	2	3	2	5
7	Nam Ji-sung (KOR)		2	2	3	2	5
7	Vít Kopřiva (CZE)			2	5	2	5
7	Petr Nouza (CZE)			2	5	2	5
7	Jeremy Beale (AUS)		4	1	2	1	6
7	Song Min-kyu (KOR)		2	1	4	1	6
7	Christopher Díaz Figueroa (GUA)		3		4	0	7
7	Sem Verbeek (NED)		3		4	0	7
7	Gábor Borsos (HUN)		2		5	0	7
7	Marco Bortolotti (ITA)		2		5	0	7
7	Bernardo Saraiva (POR)		1		6	0	7
6	Ivan Nedelko (RUS)			6		6	0
6	Roman Safiullin (RUS)	2	1	3		5	1
6	Aslan Karatsev (RUS)	1		4	1	5	1
6	Denis Yevseyev (KAZ)	1		4	1	5	1
6	Raúl Brancaccio (ITA)	4	2			4	2
6	Andrés Artuñedo (ESP)	1	1	3	1	4	2
6	Hernán Casanova (ARG)	2	2	1	1	3	3
6	Emil Ruusuvuori (FIN)	1	1	2	2	3	3
6	Pietro Rondoni (ITA)	1		2	3	3	3
6	Ivan Gakhov (RUS)		2	3	1	3	3
6	Kim Cheong-eui (KOR)			3	3	3	3
6	Federico Zeballos (BOL)			3	3	3	3
6	Germain Gigounon (BEL)	1	2	1	2	2	4
6	Altuğ Çelikbilek (TUR)			2	4	2	4
6	Nerman Fatić (BIH)			2	4	2	4
6	Marc-Andrea Hüsler (SUI)	1	4		1	1	5
6	Evan Hoyt (GBR)	1	2		3	1	5
6	Skander Mansouri (TUN)	1	2		3	1	5
6	Albano Olivetti (FRA)	1	1		4	1	5
6	Wilson Leite (BRA)		2	1	3	1	5
6	Arjun Kadhe (IND)		1	1	4	1	5
6	Rafael Matos (BRA)		1	1	4	1	5
6	Francis Alcantara (PHI)		2		4	0	6
6	Péter Nagy (HUN)		1		5	0	6
6	Alexander Pavlioutchenkov (RUS)		1		5	0	6
5	Máté Valkusz (HUN)	2		3		5	0
5	Frederico Ferreira Silva (POR)	1		4		5	0
5	Dimitar Kuzmanov (BUL)	1		4		5	0
5	João Souza (BRA)	1	1	3		4	1
5	Alexander Zhurbin (RUS)			4	1	4	1
5	Ugo Humbert (FRA)	3	2			3	2
5	Louis Wessels (GER)	3	1		1	3	2
5	Te Rigele (CHN)	2		1	2	3	2
5	Sekou Bangoura (USA)	1	1	2	1	3	2
5	Yuta Shimizu (JPN)	1	1	2	1	3	2
5	Camilo Ugo Carabelli (ARG)		2	3		3	2
5	Alexander Erler (AUT)			3	2	3	2
5	Sadio Doumbia (FRA)	2	2		1	2	3
5	Tom Jomby (FRA)	1	1	1	2	2	3
5	Sébastien Boltz (FRA)			2	3	2	3
5	Robert Strombachs (GER)			2	3	2	3
5	Markus Eriksson (SWE)	1	3		1	1	4
5	Hsu Yu-hsiou (TPE)	1	3		1	1	4
5	Bruno Sant'Anna (BRA)	1	1		3	1	4
5	Mick Lescure (FRA)		2	1	2	1	4
5	Szymon Walków (POL)		2	1	2	1	4
5	Kevin Krawietz (GER)		1	1	3	1	4
5	Nicolò Turchetti (ITA)		1	1	3	1	4
5	Christoph Negritu (GER)			1	4	1	4
5	Kai Wehnelt (GER)			1	4	1	4
5	Florian Lakat (FRA)		4		1	0	5
5	Nicolas Meister (USA)		4		1	0	5
5	Franco Agamenone (ARG)		3		2	0	5
5	Francesco Ferrari (ITA)		2		3	0	5
5	Sergio Martos Gornés (ESP)		2		3	0	5
5	Courtney John Lock (ZIM)		1		4	0	5
5	Alexander Boborykin (RUS)				5	0	5
5	Anis Ghorbel (TUN)				5	0	5
5	Diego Hidalgo (ECU)				5	0	5
5	Alexander Merino (PER)				5	0	5
5	Caio Silva (BRA)				5	0	5
4	Riccardo Bonadio (ITA)	1		3		4	0
4	Sergio Gutiérrez Ferrol (ESP)	1		3		4	0
4	Jelle Sels (NED)	1	1	2		3	1
4	Steven Diez (CAN)	1		2	1	3	1
4	João Monteiro (POR)	1		2	1	3	1
4	Moez Echargui (TUN)			3	1	3	1
4	Manuel Guinard (FRA)			3	1	3	1
4	Nino Serdarušić (CRO)			3	1	3	1
4	Gijs Brouwer (NED)	2	2			2	2
4	Juan Pablo Ficovich (ARG)	2	2			2	2
4	Emilio Gómez (ECU)	2	2			2	2
4	Eduard Esteve Lobato (ESP)	1	2	1		2	2
4	Collin Altamirano (USA)	1	1	1	1	2	2
4	Sanjar Fayziev (UZB)	1	1	1	1	2	2
4	Michael Geerts (BEL)	1	1	1	1	2	2
4	Konstantin Kravchuk (RUS)	1	1	1	1	2	2
4	Cem İlkel (TUR)	1		1	2	2	2
4	Mario Vilella Martínez (ESP)	1		1	2	2	2
4	Nuno Borges (POR)			2	2	2	2
4	Chung Yun-seong (KOR)			2	2	2	2
4	Tomás Martín Etcheverry (ARG)			2	2	2	2
4	Rio Noguchi (JPN)			2	2	2	2
4	Patrik Rikl (CZE)			2	2	2	2
4	Marc Giner (ESP)	1	1		2	1	3
4	Matteo Martineau (FRA)	1	1		2	1	3
4	Mikhail Fufygin (RUS)	1			3	1	3
4	Patricio Heras (ARG)		3	1		1	3
4	Felipe Meligeni Alves (BRA)		2	1	1	1	3
4	Yannick Mertens (BEL)		2	1	1	1	3
4	Ronnie Schneider (USA)		2	1	1	1	3
4	Luca Castelnuovo (SUI)		1	1	2	1	3
4	Karol Drzewiecki (POL)		1	1	2	1	3
4	Oscar José Gutierrez (BRA)		1	1	2	1	3
4	Vladyslav Manafov (UKR)		1	1	2	1	3
4	Takuto Niki (JPN)		1	1	2	1	3
4	Mārtiņš Podžus (LAT)		1	1	2	1	3
4	Vijay Sundar Prashanth (IND)			1	3	1	3
4	Thomas Fancutt (AUS)		4			0	4
4	Niels Desein (BEL)		3		1	0	4
4	Luke Johnson (GBR)		2		2	0	4
4	Danylo Kalenichenko (UKR)		2		2	0	4
4	Diego Matos (BRA)		2		2	0	4
4	David Pichler (AUT)		2		2	0	4
4	Jaume Pla Malfeito (ESP)		2		2	0	4
4	Dane Propoggia (AUS)		2		2	0	4
4	Wong Chun-hun (HKG)		2		2	0	4
4	Francisco Cabral (POR)		1		3	0	4
4	Hiroyasu Ehara (JPN)		1		3	0	4
4	Vladyslav Orlov (UKR)		1		3	0	4
4	Fred Simonsson (SWE)		1		3	0	4
4	Jakob Sude (GER)		1		3	0	4
4	Vasile Antonescu (ROU)				4	0	4
4	Franco Emanuel Egea (ARG)				4	0	4
4	Gabriel Alejandro Hidalgo (ARG)				4	0	4
4	Alexander Igoshin (RUS)				4	0	4
4	Timur Kiyamov (RUS)				4	0	4
4	Tomás Lipovsek Puches (ARG)				4	0	4
4	Grigoriy Lomakin (KAZ)				4	0	4
4	Vasko Mladenov (BUL)				4	0	4
4	Federico Moreno (ARG)				4	0	4
4	Jaroslav Pospíšil (CZE)				4	0	4
4	Glenn Smits (NED)				4	0	4
4	George Tsivadze (GEO)				4	0	4
4	Thales Turini (BRA)				4	0	4
4	Volodymyr Uzhylovskyi (UKR)				4	0	4
4	Botic van de Zandschulp (NED)				4	0	4
3	Marc Polmans (AUS)	3				3	0
3	Bai Yan (CHN)	2		1		3	0
3	Attila Balázs (HUN)	2		1		3	0
3	Maverick Banes (AUS)	2		1		3	0
3	Lloyd Harris (RSA)	2		1		3	0
3	Li Zhe (CHN)	2		1		3	0
3	Grégoire Barrère (FRA)	1		2		3	0
3	Carlos Boluda-Purkiss (ESP)	1		2		3	0
3	Jack Draper (GBR)	1		2		3	0
3	Scott Griekspoor (NED)	1		2		3	0
3	Jordi Samper Montaña (ESP)	1		2		3	0
3	Tseng Chun-hsin (TPE)	1		2		3	0
3	Miljan Zekić (SRB)	1		2		3	0
3	Alessandro Bega (ITA)			3		3	0
3	Geoffrey Blancaneaux (FRA)			3		3	0
3	Dominik Böhler (GER)			3		3	0
3	Andrey Chepelev (RUS)			3		3	0
3	Elmar Ejupovic (GER)			3		3	0
3	Youssef Hossam (KOR)			3		3	0
3	Tomáš Macháč (CZE)			3		3	0
3	Bastián Malla (CHI)			3		3	0
3	Alex Molčan (SVK)			3		3	0
3	Alessandro Petrone (ITA)			3		3	0
3	Nik Razboršek (SLO)			3		3	0
3	Alexander Ritschard (USA)			3		3	0
3	JC Aragone (USA)	2	1			2	1
3	Karue Sell (BRA)	2	1			2	1
3	Lorenzo Giustino (ITA)	2			1	2	1
3	Roberto Ortega Olmedo (ESP)	2			1	2	1
3	Thai-Son Kwiatkowski (USA)	1	1	1		2	1
3	Álvaro López San Martín (ESP)	1	1	1		2	1
3	Facundo Argüello (ARG)			2	1	2	1
3	Zizou Bergs (BEL)			2	1	2	1
3	Clément Geens (BEL)			2	1	2	1
3	Peter Kobelt (USA)			2	1	2	1
3	Aleksandar Lazov (BUL)			2	1	2	1
3	Enrique López Pérez (ESP)			2	1	2	1
3	Aidan McHugh (GBR)			2	1	2	1
3	Facundo Mena (ARG)			2	1	2	1
3	Ronald Slobodchikov (RUS)			2	1	2	1
3	Francesco Vilardo (ITA)			2	1	2	1
3	Maximilian Neuchrist (AUT)	1	2			1	2
3	Nick Chappell (USA)	1	1		1	1	2
3	Fabien Reboul (FRA)	1	1		1	1	2
3	Thiemo de Bakker (NED)	1			2	1	2
3	João Lucas Reis da Silva (BRA)	1			2	1	2
3	Sergey Betov (BLR)		1	1	1	1	2
3	Pedro Martínez (ESP)		1	1	1	1	2
3	Jonas Merckx (BEL)		1	1	1	1	2
3	Rhett Purcell (NZL)		1	1	1	1	2
3	Maciej Smoła (POL)		1	1	1	1	2
3	Romain Barbosa (BEL)			1	2	1	2
3	Omar Giacalone (ITA)			1	2	1	2
3	Vasile-Alexandru Ghilea (ROU)			1	2	1	2
3	Matthias Haim (AUT)			1	2	1	2
3	Lim Yong-kyu (KOR)			1	2	1	2
3	Mateo Nicolás Martínez (ARG)			1	2	1	2
3	Julian Ocleppo (ITA)			1	2	1	2
3	Michael Vrbenský (CZE)			1	2	1	2
3	Jordi Arconada (USA)		3			0	3
3	Scott Puodziunas (AUS)		2		1	0	3
3	Martin Redlicki (USA)		2		1	0	3
3	Walter Trusendi (ITA)		2		1	0	3
3	Yeung Pak-long (HKG)		2		1	0	3
3	Tiago Cação (POR)		1		2	0	3
3	Pruchya Isaro (THA)		1		2	0	3
3	Mircea-Alexandru Jecan (ROU)		1		2	0	3
3	Michail Pervolarakis (GRE)		1		2	0	3
3	Filip Polášek (SVK)		1		2	0	3
3	David Vega Hernández (ESP)		1		2	0	3
3	Marcelo Zormann (BRA)		1		2	0	3
3	Jonathan Binding (GBR)				3	0	3
3	Maikel Borg (NED)				3	0	3
3	Anton Chekhov (RUS)				3	0	3
3	Marc Dijkhuizen (NED)				3	0	3
3	Filip Duda (CZE)				3	0	3
3	Marek Gengel (CZE)				3	0	3
3	Stephan Gerritsen (NED)				3	0	3
3	Vladimir Ivanov (EST)				3	0	3
3	Markos Kalovelonis (RUS)				3	0	3
3	Clément Larrière (FRA)				3	0	3
3	Ivan Liutarevich (BLR)				3	0	3
3	Jordi Muñoz Abreu (VEN)				3	0	3
3	Bernardo Oliveira (BRA)				3	0	3
3	Junior Alexander Ore (USA)				3	0	3
3	Juan Pablo Paz (ARG)				3	0	3
3	Artem Smirnov (UKR)				3	0	3
3	Roy de Valk (NED)				3	0	3
2	Grégoire Jacq (FRA)	2				2	0
2	João Menezes (BRA)	2				2	0
2	Jacopo Berrettini (ITA)	1		1		2	0
2	Yannick Jankovits (FRA)	1		1		2	0
2	Jules Okala (FRA)	1		1		2	0
2	Fabrizio Ornago (ITA)	1		1		2	0
2	Alex Rybakov (USA)	1		1		2	0
2	Juan Pablo Varillas (PER)	1		1		2	0
2	Marcelo Tomás Barrios Vera (CHI)			2		2	0
2	Riccardo Bellotti (ITA)			2		2	0
2	Juan Manuel Benítez Chavarriaga (COL)			2		2	0
2	Daniel Brands (GER)			2		2	0
2	Francisco Cerúndolo (ARG)			2		2	0
2	Jan Choinski (GER)			2		2	0
2	Jordan Correia (BRA)			2		2	0
2	Dragoș Dima (ROU)			2		2	0
2	Artem Dubrivnyy (RUS)			2		2	0
2	David Guez (FRA)			2		2	0
2	Gustav Hansson (SWE)			2		2	0
2	Tom Kočevar-Dešman (SLO)			2		2	0
2	Karim-Mohamed Maamoun (EGY)			2		2	0
2	Daniel Nguyen (USA)			2		2	0
2	Lamine Ouahab (MAR)			2		2	0
2	Matthieu Perchicot (FRA)			2		2	0
2	David Poljak (CZE)			2		2	0
2	Gianluigi Quinzi (ITA)			2		2	0
2	Tim van Rijthoven (NED)			2		2	0
2	Arthur Rinderknech (FRA)			2		2	0
2	Igor Sijsling (NED)			2		2	0
2	Thomas Statzberger (AUT)			2		2	0
2	Johan Tatlot (FRA)			2		2	0
2	Marko Tepavac (SRB)			2		2	0
2	Gonzalo Villanueva (ARG)			2		2	0
2	Mark Whitehouse (GBR)			2		2	0
2	Yang Tsung-hua (TPE)			2		2	0
2	Nicolás Álvarez (PER)	1	1			1	1
2	Pedro Cachin (ARG)	1	1			1	1
2	Hugo Dellien (BOL)	1	1			1	1
2	Sandro Ehrat (SUI)	1	1			1	1
2	Evan Zhu (USA)	1	1			1	1
2	Alen Avidzba (RUS)	1			1	1	1
2	Peter Bothwell (IRL)	1			1	1	1
2	Corentin Denolly (FRA)	1			1	1	1
2	Nicolae Frunză (ROU)	1			1	1	1
2	Antonio Massara (ITA)	1			1	1	1
2	Renta Tokuda (JPN)	1			1	1	1
2	Brandon Holt (USA)		1	1		1	1
2	Edan Leshem (ISR)		1	1		1	1
2	Julien Cagnina (BEL)			1	1	1	1
2	Adam El Mihdawy (USA)			1	1	1	1
2	Maximiliano Estévez (ARG)			1	1	1	1
2	Lorenzo Frigerio (ITA)			1	1	1	1
2	Teymuraz Gabashvili (RUS)			1	1	1	1
2	Benjamin Hassan (GER)			1	1	1	1
2	Hong Seong-chan (KOR)			1	1	1	1
2	Dejan Katić (SRB)			1	1	1	1
2	Laurent Lokoli (FRA)			1	1	1	1
2	Dragoș Nicolae Mădăraș (SWE)			1	1	1	1
2	Toby Martin (GBR)			1	1	1	1
2	Daniel Masur (GER)			1	1	1	1
2	Gonçalo Oliveira (POR)			1	1	1	1
2	Danilo Petrović (SRB)			1	1	1	1
2	Santiago Rodríguez Taverna (ARG)			1	1	1	1
2	Omar Salman (BEL)			1	1	1	1
2	Thiago Seyboth Wild (BRA)			1	1	1	1
2	Igor Smilansky (ISR)			1	1	1	1
2	Manish Sureshkumar (IND)			1	1	1	1
2	Luke Bambridge (GBR)		2			0	2
2	Ulises Blanch (USA)		2			0	2
2	Tomislav Brkić (BIH)		2			0	2
2	André Göransson (SWE)		2			0	2
2	Martin Joyce (USA)		2			0	2
2	Genaro Alberto Olivieri (ARG)		2			0	2
2	Jakub Paul (SUI)		2			0	2
2	Milan Radojković (SRB)		2			0	2
2	Harrison Adams (USA)		1		1	0	2
2	Alec Adamson (USA)		1		1	0	2
2	Adrian Bodmer (SUI)		1		1	0	2
2	Rémi Boutillier (FRA)		1		1	0	2
2	Dusty Boyer (USA)		1		1	0	2
2	Justin Butsch (USA)		1		1	0	2
2	Victor Vlad Cornea (ROU)		1		1	0	2
2	Enrico Dalla Valle (ITA)		1		1	0	2
2	Gonzalo Escobar (ECU)		1		1	0	2
2	Jack Findel-Hawkins (GBR)		1		1	0	2
2	Francesco Forti (ITA)		1		1	0	2
2	Mattia Frinzi (ITA)		1		1	0	2
2	Nicholas Hu (USA)		1		1	0	2
2	Korey Lovett (USA)		1		1	0	2
2	Lý Hoàng Nam (VIE)		1		1	0	2
2	Jānis Podžus (LAT)		1		1	0	2
2	Kenneth Raisma (EST)		1		1	0	2
2	Sami Reinwein (GER)		1		1	0	2
2	Matthew Romios (AUS)		1		1	0	2
2	Samuel Shropshire (USA)		1		1	0	2
2	Yaraslav Shyla (BLR)		1		1	0	2
2	Eduardo Struvay (COL)		1		1	0	2
2	Sun Fajing (CHN)		1		1	0	2
2	Kaito Uesugi (JPN)		1		1	0	2
2	Alexander Vasilenko (RUS)		1		1	0	2
2	Mark Vervoort (NED)		1		1	0	2
2	Alexander Weis (ITA)		1		1	0	2
2	Boy Westerhof (NED)		1		1	0	2
2	Cengiz Aksu (TUR)				2	0	2
2	Sagadat Ayap (KAZ)				2	0	2
2	Tadas Babelis (LTU)				2	0	2
2	Sergio Barranco (ESP)				2	0	2
2	Marco Brugnerotto (ITA)				2	0	2
2	Cristian Carli (ITA)				2	0	2
2	Maxime Chazal (FRA)				2	0	2
2	Paweł Ciaś (POL)				2	0	2
2	Francisco Dias (POR)				2	0	2
2	Scott Duncan (GBR)				2	0	2
2	John Paul Fruttero (USA)				2	0	2
2	Dante Gennaro (ITA)				2	0	2
2	Johannes Härteis (GER)				2	0	2
2	Arklon Huertas del Pino (PER)				2	0	2
2	Conner Huertas del Pino (PER)				2	0	2
2	Hunter Johnson (USA)				2	0	2
2	Yates Johnson (USA)				2	0	2
2	Sho Katayama (JPN)				2	0	2
2	Shahin Khaledan (IRI)				2	0	2
2	Alexis Klégou (BEN)				2	0	2
2	Michal Konečný (CZE)				2	0	2
2	Michiel de Krom (NED)				2	0	2
2	Tyler Lu (USA)				2	0	2
2	Goran Marković (SRB)				2	0	2
2	Petr Michnev (CZE)				2	0	2
2	Alexis Musialek (FRA)				2	0	2
2	Noh Sang-woo (KOR)				2	0	2
2	Guilherme Osório (POR)				2	0	2
2	Jorge Panta (PER)				2	0	2
2	Tadeáš Paroulek (CZE)				2	0	2
2	Luis Patiño (MEX)				2	0	2
2	Mats Rosenkranz (GER)				2	0	2
2	Ivan Sabanov (CRO)				2	0	2
2	Matej Sabanov (CRO)				2	0	2
2	Juan Carlos Sáez (CHI)				2	0	2
2	Giovani Samaha (LBN)				2	0	2
2	Karunuday Singh (IND)				2	0	2
2	Jacopo Stefanini (ITA)				2	0	2
2	Bart Stevens (NED)				2	0	2
2	Alejo Vilaro (ARG)				2	0	2
2	Wang Aoran (CHN)				2	0	2
2	Benjamín Winter López (ESP)				2	0	2
2	Fernando Yamacita (BRA)				2	0	2
2	Yu Cheng-yu (TPE)				2	0	2
2	Kacper Żuk (POL)				2	0	2
1	Alafia Ayeni (USA)	1				1	0
1	Riccardo Balzerani (ITA)	1				1	0
1	Mathias Bourgue (FRA)	1				1	0
1	Petros Chrysochos (CYP)	1				1	0
1	Federico Coria (ARG)	1				1	0
1	Oliver Crawford (USA)	1				1	0
1	Tom Fawcett (USA)	1				1	0
1	Axel Geller (ARG)	1				1	0
1	Lloyd Glasspool (GBR)	1				1	0
1	Laurynas Grigelis (LTU)	1				1	0
1	Jacob Grills (AUS)	1				1	0
1	Lenny Hampel (AUT)	1				1	0
1	Christopher Heyman (BEL)	1				1	0
1	Jared Hiltzik (USA)	1				1	0
1	Jeremy Jahn (GER)	1				1	0
1	Niki Kaliyanda Poonacha (IND)	1				1	0
1	Evgeny Karlovskiy (RUS)	1				1	0
1	Dominik Köpfer (GER)	1				1	0
1	Nikola Milojević (SRB)	1				1	0
1	Yuki Mochizuki (JPN)	1				1	0
1	Hiroki Moriya (JPN)	1				1	0
1	Alexandre Müller (FRA)	1				1	0
1	Saketh Myneni (IND)	1				1	0
1	Zsombor Piros (HUN)	1				1	0
1	Max Purcell (AUS)	1				1	0
1	Michael Redlicki (USA)	1				1	0
1	Lukáš Rosol (CZE)	1				1	0
1	Takashi Saito (JPN)	1				1	0
1	Gleb Sakharov (FRA)	1				1	0
1	Tobias Simon (GER)	1				1	0
1	Nicolás Alberto Arreche (ARG)			1		1	0
1	Maxime Authom (BEL)			1		1	0
1	Elliot Benchetrit (FRA)			1		1	0
1	Samuel Brosset (FRA)			1		1	0
1	Jay Clarke (GBR)			1		1	0
1	Mirko Cutuli (ITA)			1		1	0
1	Alejandro Davidovich Fokina (ESP)			1		1	0
1	Philipp Davydenko (RUS)			1		1	0
1	Mate Delić (CRO)			1		1	0
1	Mauricio Echazú (PER)			1		1	0
1	Sebastian Fanselow (GER)			1		1	0
1	Edris Fetisleam (ROU)			1		1	0
1	Claudio Fortuna (ITA)			1		1	0
1	Karl Friberg (SWE)			1		1	0
1	Evan Furness (FRA)			1		1	0
1	Takanyi Garanganga (ZIM)			1		1	0
1	Lucas Gerch (GER)			1		1	0
1	Daniel Gimeno Traver (ESP)			1		1	0
1	Jonathan Gray (GBR)			1		1	0
1	Prajnesh Gunneswaran (IND)			1		1	0
1	Hady Habib (LBN)			1		1	0
1	Nick Hardt (DOM)			1		1	0
1	Antoine Hoang (FRA)			1		1	0
1	Marsel İlhan (TUR)			1		1	0
1	Paul Jubb (GBR)			1		1	0
1	Jurabek Karimov (UZB)			1		1	0
1	Lukáš Klein (SVK)			1		1	0
1	Denis Klok (RUS)			1		1	0
1	Alexandar Lazarov (BUL)			1		1	0
1	Gerardo López Villaseñor (MEX)			1		1	0
1	Roberto Marcora (ITA)			1		1	0
1	Jules Marie (FRA)			1		1	0
1	Javier Martí (ESP)			1		1	0
1	George von Massow (GER)			1		1	0
1	Pascal Meis (GER)			1		1	0
1	Nicolás Mejía (COL)			1		1	0
1	Jan Mertl (CZE)			1		1	0
1	Marko Miladinović (SRB)			1		1	0
1	Gian Marco Moroni (ITA)			1		1	0
1	Daniel Muñoz de la Nava (ESP)			1		1	0
1	Richard Muzaev (RUS)			1		1	0
1	Brandon Nakashima (USA)			1		1	0
1	Marvin Netuschil (GER)			1		1	0
1	Oh Seong-gook (KOR)			1		1	0
1	Ben Patael (ISR)			1		1	0
1	Gabriel Petit (FRA)			1		1	0
1	Ajeet Rai (NZL)			1		1	0
1	Or Ram-Harel (ISR)			1		1	0
1	Quentin Robert (REU)			1		1	0
1	Ricardo Rodríguez (VEN)			1		1	0
1	Stefan Seifert (GER)			1		1	0
1	Alejandro Tabilo (CHI)			1		1	0
1	Ryota Tanuma (JPN)			1		1	0
1	Pol Toledo Bagué (ESP)			1		1	0
1	Wishaya Trongcharoenchaikul (THA)			1		1	0
1	Matteo Viola (ITA)			1		1	0
1	Tak Khunn Wang (FRA)			1		1	0
1	Yosuke Watanuki (JPN)			1		1	0
1	Dzmitry Zhyrmont (BLR)			1		1	0
1	Bogdan Ionuț Apostol (ROU)		1			0	1
1	Justin Barki (INA)		1			0	1
1	Alberto Barroso Campos (ESP)		1			0	1
1	Tomasz Bednarek (POL)		1			0	1
1	Rémy Bertola (SUI)		1			0	1
1	Constantin Bittoun Kouzmine (FRA)		1			0	1
1	Julian Bradley (IRL)		1			0	1
1	Liam Caruana (ITA)		1			0	1
1	Alessandro Ceppellini (ITA)		1			0	1
1	Scott Clayton (GBR)		1			0	1
1	Martín Cuevas (URU)		1			0	1
1	Daniel Cukierman (ISR)		1			0	1
1	Marat Deviatiarov (UKR)		1			0	1
1	Gianluca Di Nicola (ITA)		1			0	1
1	Eduardo Dischinger (BRA)		1			0	1
1	Blake Ellis (AUS)		1			0	1
1	Charlie Emhardt (USA)		1			0	1
1	Florian Fallert (GER)		1			0	1
1	Linus Frost (SWE)		1			0	1
1	Sora Fukuda (JPN)		1			0	1
1	Alexis Galarneau (CAN)		1			0	1
1	Alejandro Gómez (COL)		1			0	1
1	Lucas Gómez (MEX)		1			0	1
1	Alexandru Gozun (MDA)		1			0	1
1	Hans Hach Verdugo (MEX)		1			0	1
1	Hua Runhao (CHN)		1			0	1
1	Timur Khabibulin (KAZ)		1			0	1
1	Vasil Kirkov (USA)		1			0	1
1	David Klier (GER)		1			0	1
1	Mateusz Kowalczyk (POL)		1			0	1
1	Tristan Lamasine (FRA)		1			0	1
1	Lê Quốc Khánh (VIE)		1			0	1
1	Patrick Mayer (GER)		1			0	1
1	Denys Molchanov (UKR)		1			0	1
1	Aleksandr Nedovyesov (KAZ)		1			0	1
1	Hiromasa Oku (JPN)		1			0	1
1	Emil Reinberg (USA)		1			0	1
1	Ruan Roelofse (RSA)		1			0	1
1	Christopher Rungkat (INA)		1			0	1
1	Joe Salisbury (GBR)		1			0	1
1	Christian Samuelsson (SWE)		1			0	1
1	Luke Saville (AUS)		1			0	1
1	Benjamin Sigouin (CAN)		1			0	1
1	Khumoyun Sultanov (UZB)		1			0	1
1	Luca George Tatomir (ROU)		1			0	1
1	Adam Taylor (AUS)		1			0	1
1	Jason Taylor (AUS)		1			0	1
1	Marcus Willis (GBR)		1			0	1
1	Matthias Wunner (GER)		1			0	1
1	Zeng Shihong (CHN)		1			0	1
1	Mohamed Abdel-Aziz (EGY)				1	0	1
1	Juan Carlos Aguilar (BOL)				1	0	1
1	Jakob Aichhorn (AUT)				1	0	1
1	Vadim Alekseenko (UKR)				1	0	1
1	Tuna Altuna (TUR)				1	0	1
1	Kunal Anand (IND)				1	0	1
1	Andrei Ștefan Apostol (ROU)				1	0	1
1	Boris Arias (BOL)				1	0	1
1	Petr Arkhipov (RUS)				1	0	1
1	Aleksandre Bakshi (GEO)				1	0	1
1	Manuel Barros (ARG)				1	0	1
1	Colin van Beem (NED)				1	0	1
1	Antoine Bellier (SUI)				1	0	1
1	José Daniel Bendeck (COL)				1	0	1
1	Conor Berg (USA)				1	0	1
1	Filip Bergevi (SWE)				1	0	1
1	Santiago Besada (ARG)				1	0	1
1	Sergey Bolotov (RUS)				1	0	1
1	Adrien Bossel (SUI)				1	0	1
1	Bar Tzuf Botzer (ISR)				1	0	1
1	Pascal Brunner (AUT)				1	0	1
1	Trent Bryde (USA)				1	0	1
1	Nikola Čačić (SRB)				1	0	1
1	Franco Capalbo (ARG)				1	0	1
1	A.J. Catanzariti (USA)				1	0	1
1	Ljubomir Čelebić (MNE)				1	0	1
1	Chung Hong (KOR)				1	0	1
1	Flavio Cipolla (ITA)				1	0	1
1	Alexander Cozbinov (MDA)				1	0	1
1	Erik Crepaldi (ITA)				1	0	1
1	Patrick Daciek (USA)				1	0	1
1	Giacomo Dambrosi (ITA)				1	0	1
1	Ivan Davydov (RUS)				1	0	1
1	Ivan Denisov (RUS)				1	0	1
1	Oleg Dolgosheyev (UKR)				1	0	1
1	Viktor Durasovic (NOR)				1	0	1
1	Shalva Dzhanashiya (RUS)				1	0	1
1	Shahar Elbaz (ISR)				1	0	1
1	Connor Farren (USA)				1	0	1
1	Marc Fornell Mestres (ESP)				1	0	1
1	James Frawley (AUS)				1	0	1
1	Davide Galoppini (ITA)				1	0	1
1	Luke Jacob Gamble (USA)				1	0	1
1	Hugo Gaston (FRA)				1	0	1
1	Peter Goldsteiner (AUT)				1	0	1
1	Patrick Grigoriu (ROU)				1	0	1
1	Valentin Günther (GER)				1	0	1
1	Andrea Guerrieri (ITA)				1	0	1
1	Petr Hájek (CZE)				1	0	1
1	Christopher Haworth (USA)				1	0	1
1	Shinji Hazawa (JPN)				1	0	1
1	Guy den Heijer (NED)				1	0	1
1	Christian Hirschmüller (GER)				1	0	1
1	Darko Jandrić (SRB)				1	0	1
1	Jiří Jeníček (CZE)				1	0	1
1	Trevor Allen Johnson (USA)				1	0	1
1	Facundo Juárez (ARG)				1	0	1
1	Dmytro Kamynin (UKR)				1	0	1
1	Jonathan Kanar (FRA)				1	0	1
1	Patrick Kaukovalta (FIN)				1	0	1
1	Patrick Kawka (USA)				1	0	1
1	Dominik Kellovský (CZE)				1	0	1
1	Robert Kelly (USA)				1	0	1
1	Robin Kern (GER)				1	0	1
1	Roman Khassanov (KAZ)				1	0	1
1	Cannon Kingsley (USA)				1	0	1
1	Sebastian Korda (USA)				1	0	1
1	Lee Jea-moon (KOR)				1	0	1
1	Lee Tae-woo (KOR)				1	0	1
1	Pietro Licciardi (ITA)				1	0	1
1	Michael Look (AUS)				1	0	1
1	Niels Lootsma (NED)				1	0	1
1	Petru-Alexandru Luncanu (ROU)				1	0	1
1	Jody Maginley (ATG)				1	0	1
1	Călin Manda (ROU)				1	0	1
1	Alexander Mannapov (GER)				1	0	1
1	Felipe Mantilla (COL)				1	0	1
1	Mirko Martinez (SUI)				1	0	1
1	Adria Mas Mascolo (ESP)				1	0	1
1	John McNally (USA)				1	0	1
1	Tyler Mercier (USA)				1	0	1
1	Aleksandre Metreveli (GEO)				1	0	1
1	Ivan Mikhaylyuk (RUS)				1	0	1
1	Samuel Monette (CAN)				1	0	1
1	Soichiro Moritani (JPN)				1	0	1
1	Alessandro Motti (ITA)				1	0	1
1	Duncan Mugabe (UGA)				1	0	1
1	François Musitelli (FRA)				1	0	1
1	Jirat Navasirisomboon (THA)				1	0	1
1	Marco Neubau (ESP)				1	0	1
1	Nguyễn Văn Phương (VIE)				1	0	1
1	Frederik Nielsen (DEN)				1	0	1
1	Ryan Nijboer (NED)				1	0	1
1	Masakatsu Noguchi (JPN)				1	0	1
1	José Olivares (DOM)				1	0	1
1	Alexander Ovcharov (RUS)				1	0	1
1	Grzegorz Panfil (POL)				1	0	1
1	Manuel Peña López (ARG)				1	0	1
1	Sebastian Prechtel (GER)				1	0	1
1	Oleg Prihodko (UKR)				1	0	1
1	Sidané Pontjodikromo (NED)				1	0	1
1	Giorgio Portaluri (ITA)				1	0	1
1	Matheus Pucinelli de Almeida (BRA)				1	0	1
1	Jayesh Pungliya (IND)				1	0	1
1	Sonchat Ratiwatana (THA)				1	0	1
1	Maxim Ratniuk (RUS)				1	0	1
1	Sidharth Rawat (IND)				1	0	1
1	Eduardo Ribeiro (BRA)				1	0	1
1	Giorgio Ricca (ITA)				1	0	1
1	Cristian Rodríguez (COL)				1	0	1
1	Alen Rogić Hadžalić (CRO)				1	0	1
1	Eduardo Russi Assumpção (BRA)				1	0	1
1	Olly Sadler (NZL)				1	0	1
1	Sherif Sabry (EGY)				1	0	1
1	Yuto Sakai (JPN)				1	0	1
1	Masaki Sasai (JPN)				1	0	1
1	Constantin Schmitz (GER)				1	0	1
1	Matt Seeberger (USA)				1	0	1
1	Miles Seemann (USA)				1	0	1
1	Marek Semjan (SVK)				1	0	1
1	Seol Jae-min (KOR)				1	0	1
1	Christian Seraphim (GER)				1	0	1
1	Ryan Shane (USA)				1	0	1
1	Sho Shimabukuro (JPN)				1	0	1
1	Jannik Sinner (ITA)				1	0	1
1	David Škoch (CZE)				1	0	1
1	Mikhail Sokolovskiy (RUS)				1	0	1
1	Jeremy Sonkin (USA)				1	0	1
1	Lakshit Sood (IND)				1	0	1
1	Chanchai Sookton-Eng (THA)				1	0	1
1	Kelsey Stevenson (CAN)				1	0	1
1	Timo Stodder (GER)				1	0	1
1	James Story (GBR)				1	0	1
1	Isaiah Strode (USA)				1	0	1
1	Clément Tabur (FRA)				1	0	1
1	Yunosuke Tanaka (JPN)				1	0	1
1	Maxime Tchoutakian (FRA)				1	0	1
1	Tim van Terheijden (NED)				1	0	1
1	Peter Torebko (GER)				1	0	1
1	Eduardo Agustín Torre (ARG)				1	0	1
1	Preston Touliatos (USA)				1	0	1
1	Mert Naci Türker (TUR)				1	0	1
1	Vadym Ursu (UKR)				1	0	1
1	Eero Vasa (FIN)				1	0	1
1	Andrea Vavassori (ITA)				1	0	1
1	François-Arthur Vibert (FRA)				1	0	1
1	Otto Virtanen (FIN)				1	0	1
1	Vojtěch Vlkovský (CZE)				1	0	1
1	Matěj Vocel (CZE)				1	0	1
1	Wang Ruikai (CHN)				1	0	1
1	Wang Ruixuan (CHN)				1	0	1
1	Yann Wójcik (POL)				1	0	1
1	Wu Hao (CHN)				1	0	1
1	Jumpei Yamasaki (JPN)				1	0	1
1	Daniel Yoo (KOR)				1	0	1
1	Anıl Yüksel (TUR)				1	0	1
1	Kasparas Žemaitėlis (LTU)				1	0	1
1	Yasha Zemel (ISR)				1	0	1
1	Jan Zieliński (POL)				1	0	1

=== Titles won by nation ===
Updated as of December 31

Total	Nation	$25K		$15K		Total	
Total	Nation	S	D	S	D	S	D
108	France (FRA)	20	22	35	31	55	53
91	United States (USA)	13	27	17	34	30	61
85	Spain (ESP)	13	10	34	28	47	38
84	Argentina (ARG)	7	11	27	39	34	50
81	Italy (ITA)	12	12	27	30	39	42
80	Russia (RUS)	7	5	35	33	42	38
73	Germany (GER)	7	7	28	31	35	38
58	Brazil (BRA)	8	12	11	27	19	39
44	Netherlands (NED)	5	7	8	24	13	31
40	Belgium (BEL)	3	8	14	15	17	23
36	Portugal (POR)	2	3	12	19	14	21
33	Czech Republic (CZE)	1		11	21	12	21
33	Japan (JPN)	5	5	9	14	14	19
32	Great Britain (GBR)	3	8	10	11	13	19
27	Austria (AUT)	3	4	9	11	12	15
26	South Korea (KOR)		2	11	13	11	15
23	Australia (AUS)	7	9	2	5	9	14
22	Tunisia (TUN)	2	4	4	12	6	16
20	Ukraine (UKR)		5	1	14	1	19
18	Hungary (HUN)	5	2	4	7	9	9
18	Finland (FIN)	2	4	4	8	6	12
17	Switzerland (SUI)	2	8	1	6	3	14
16	China (CHN)	6	2	3	5	9	7
16	Serbia (SRB)	2	2	7	5	9	7
16	India (IND)	2	1	4	9	6	10
16	Sweden (SWE)	1	6	4	5	5	11
15	Romania (ROU)	1	2	4	8	5	10
15	Poland (POL)		4	3	8	3	12
14	Peru (PER)	2	1	2	9	4	10
13	Bulgaria (BUL)	1		7	5	8	5
13	Kazakhstan (KAZ)	1	1	4	7	5	8
12	Turkey (TUR)	1		4	7	5	7
11	Chinese Taipei (TPE)	2	3	3	3	5	6
11	Ecuador (ECU)	2	3		6	2	9
9	Bolivia (BOL)	1	1	3	4	4	5
9	Zimbabwe (ZIM)		1	3	5	3	6
9	Guatemala (GUA)		4		5	0	9
8	Chile (CHI)			6	2	6	2
8	Israel (ISR)		1	4	3	4	4
8	Slovakia (SVK)		1	4	3	4	4
8	Croatia (CRO)			4	4	4	4
8	Colombia (COL)		2	3	3	3	5
8	Bosnia and Herzegovina (BIH)		2	2	4	2	6
7	Egypt (EGY)			5	2	5	2
7	Canada (CAN)	1	1	2	3	3	4
7	Belarus (BLR)		1	2	4	2	5
6	Thailand (THA)		1	1	4	1	5
6	Philippines (PHI)		2		4	0	6
5	Slovenia (SLO)			5		5	0
5	Uzbekistan (UZB)	1	1	2	1	3	2
5	Mexico (MEX)		2	1	2	1	4
5	Estonia (EST)		1		4	0	5
5	Georgia (GEO)				5	0	5
4	South Africa (RSA)	2	1	1		3	1
4	New Zealand (NZL)		1	2	1	2	2
4	Latvia (LAT)		1	1	2	1	3
4	Venezuela (VEN)			1	3	1	3
4	Hong Kong (HKG)		2		2	0	4
3	Ireland (IRL)	1	1		1	1	2
3	Lithuania (LTU)	1			2	1	2
3	Greece (GRE)				3	0	3
2	Morocco (MAR)			2		2	0
2	Dominican Republic (DOM)			1	1	1	1
2	Moldova (MDA)		1		1	0	2
2	Vietnam (VIE)		1		1	0	2
2	Benin (BEN)				2	0	2
2	Iran (IRI)				2	0	2
2	Lebanon (LBN)				2	0	2
1	Cyprus (CYP)	1				1	0
1	Réunion (REU)			1		1	0
1	Indonesia (INA)		1			0	1
1	Uruguay (URU)		1			0	1
1	Antigua and Barbuda (ATG)				1	0	1
1	Denmark (DEN)				1	0	1
1	Montenegro (MNE)				1	0	1
1	Norway (NOR)				1	0	1
1	Uganda (UGA)				1	0	1

- Hady Habib started representing Lebanon in June, he won one singles title while representing the United States.
- Maxime Cressy started representing the United States in December, he won one singles title and eight doubles titles while representing France.

== See also ==
- 2018 ATP World Tour
- 2018 ATP Challenger Tour
- 2018 ITF Women's Circuit
