= Kimberly Birrell =

Australian tennis player (born 1998)

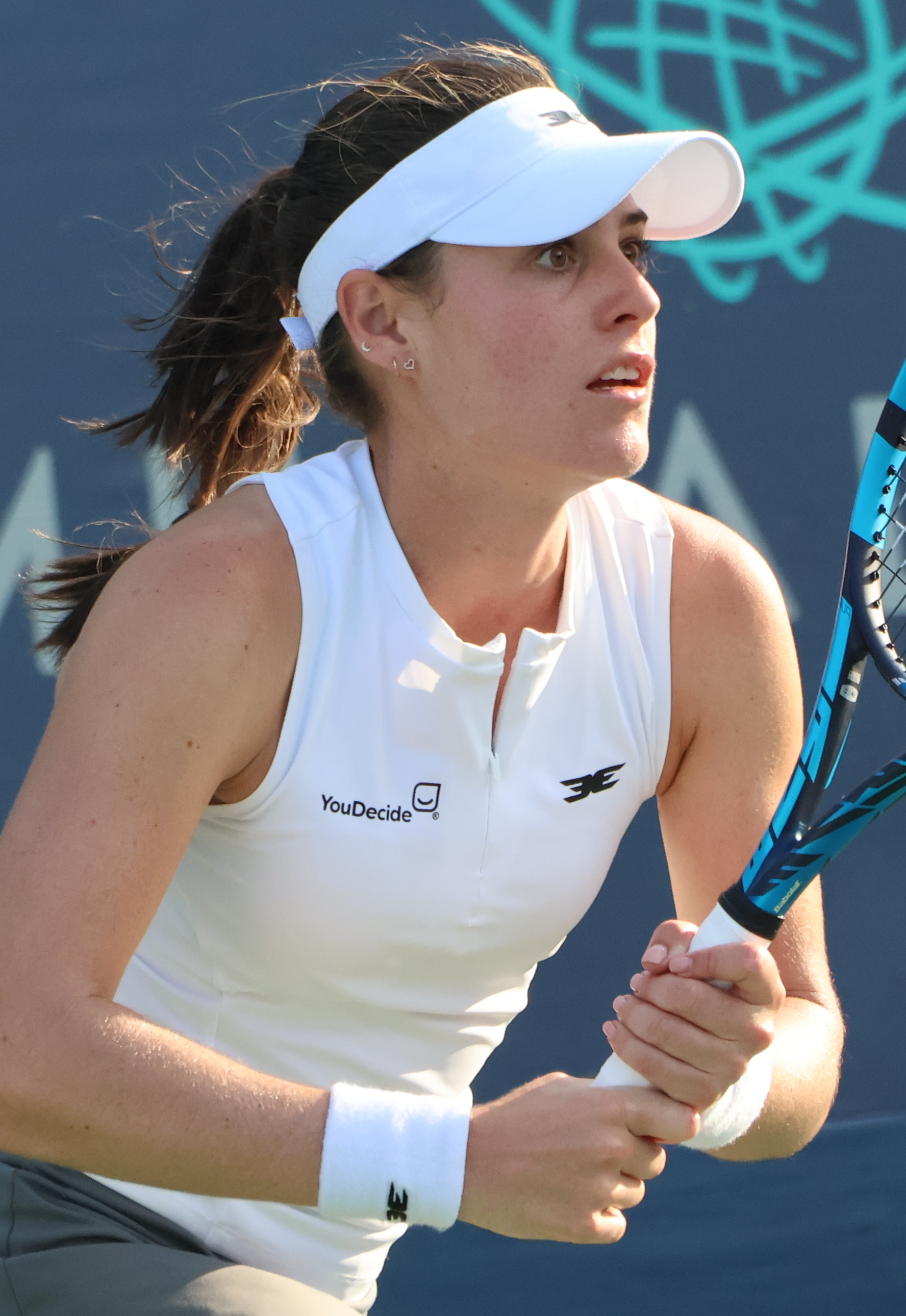
- Birrell at the 2024 Washington Open
- Country (sports): Australia
- Residence: Gold Coast, Australia
- Born: 29 April 1998 (age 28) Düsseldorf, Germany
- Height: 1.70 m (5 ft 7 in)
- Turned pro: 2014
- Plays: Right (two-handed backhand)
- Coach: Nicole Pratt
- Prize money: $3,178,702

Singles
- Career record: 287–236
- Career titles: 1
- Highest ranking: No. 40 (12 October 2026)
- Current ranking: No. 40 (12 October 2026)

Grand Slam singles results
- Australian Open: 3R (2019)
- French Open: 2R (2026)
- Wimbledon: 2R (2026)
- US Open: 2R (2026)

Doubles
- Career record: 78–91
- Career titles: 2 ITF
- Highest ranking: No. 93 (4 May 2026)
- Current ranking: No. 124 (28 September 2026)

Grand Slam doubles results
- Australian Open: QF (2026)
- French Open: 1R (2025, 2026)
- Wimbledon: 3R (2025)
- US Open: 1R (2025, 2026)

Grand Slam mixed doubles results
- Australian Open: F (2025)

Team competitions
- Fed Cup: 1–3
- Last updated on: 28 September 2026.

Kimberly Birrell (born 29 April 1998) is an Australian professional tennis player. She has a career-high WTA singles ranking of No. 40, achieved on 12 October 2026 and a best in doubles of No. 93, reached on 4 May 2026.

Birrell has won one WTA Tour singles title at the 2026 Korea Open. She was also runner-up in the 2025 Australian Open mixed doubles.

== Personal life ==
Birrell was born in Düsseldorf, Germany, on 29 April 1998 to Australian parents. Her father, John, was working as a tennis coach in Germany at the time of her birth and shortly after relocated his family to Wodonga, Victoria. The family then settled on the Gold Coast, Queensland when Birrell was three years of age as her father took up a role as the head coach of Pat Cash's Tennis Academy. She has a brother Cade who is also a tennis player.

She began playing tennis at the age of four and switched training bases to the Queens Park Tennis Centre in 2008 when her father began managing the club. Queens Park had previously produced top 20 tennis players such as Bernard Tomic and Samantha Stosur, the latter of whom would train with Birrell when visiting the club. Birrell attended Coomera Anglican College during her schooling years and graduated in 2015.

== Career ==
=== Juniors ===
Birrell began playing on the ITF Junior Circuit under-18 events in July 2011 as a 13-year-old. She reached her first junior final a year later in Sydney and came out victorious over Pamela Boyanov in three sets. Following a strong 2012 season, she made her junior major debut at the 2013 Australian Open at 14 years of age and was beaten by Sweden's Rebecca Peterson, in straight sets. She continued to improve her junior ranking throughout 2013 by reaching two finals.

She entered the 2014 Australian Open unseeded and caused several upsets on her way to the semifinals, where she was defeated by Croatian player Jana Fett. She went on to compete in all the remaining majors throughout 2014 and reached her highest junior ranking of 18 in the world. Birrell competed in three junior major events in 2015 but mostly focused on the women's tour.

=== 2012–15: Pro beginnings ===
Birrell competed in her first professional event at the Bendigo Tennis Centre in October 2012 at the age of 14. She gained her first professional ranking point a year later with a straight sets win over Elizabeth James after receiving a wildcard into the main draw of a tournament held in her home state of Queensland. She finished 2013 with a professional singles ranking of No. 847.

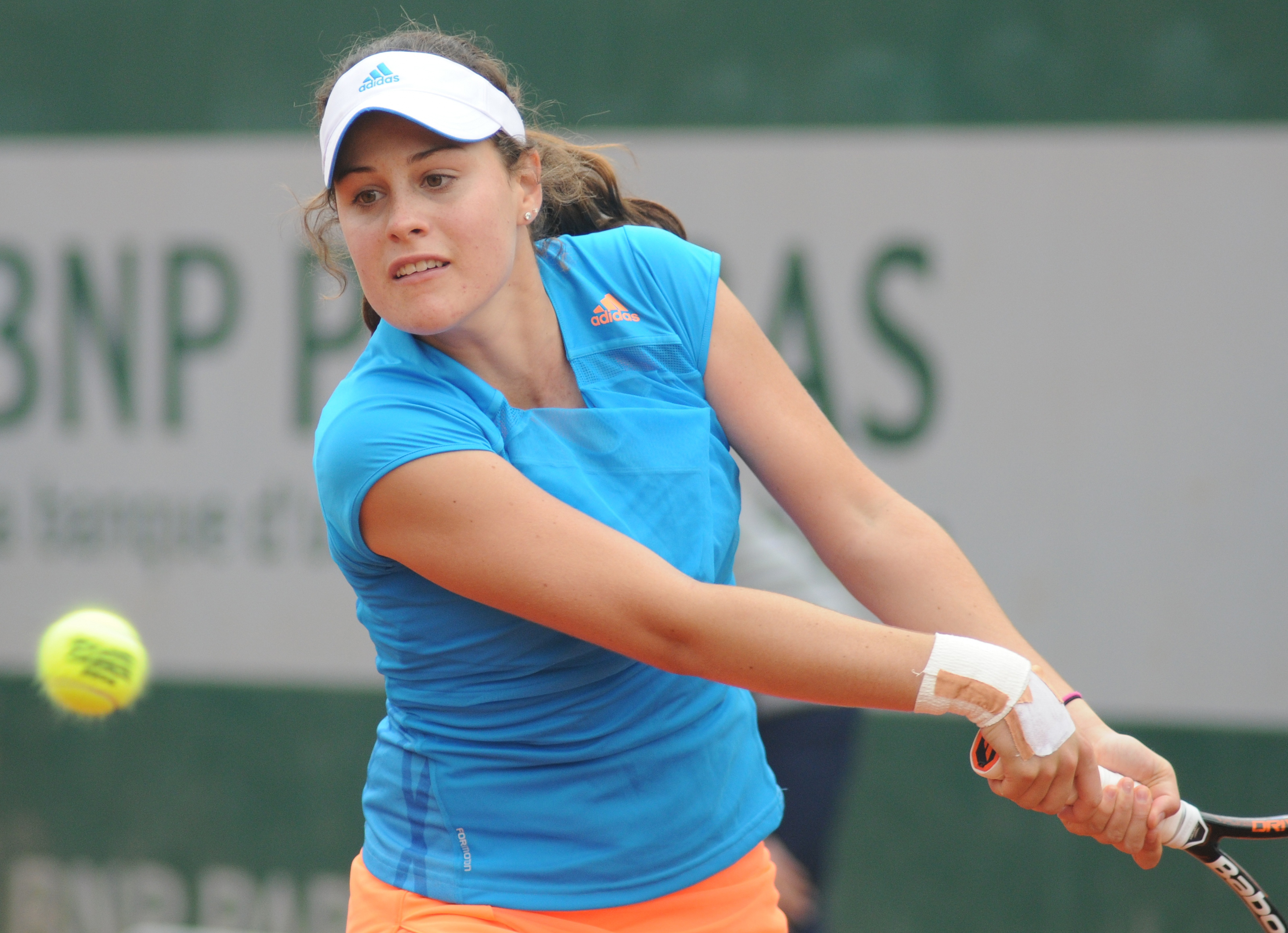
Birrell in 2014

Birrell and compatriot Olivia Tjandramulia were awarded a wildcard entry into the doubles main-draw at the 2014 Hobart International, where they lost in the first round to second seeds Lisa Raymond and Zhang Shuai.

In November 2014, Birrell was given wildcards to the two Bendigo International tournaments. In her debut at a $50k event, she defeated world No. 351, Veronika Kapshay, in straight sets.

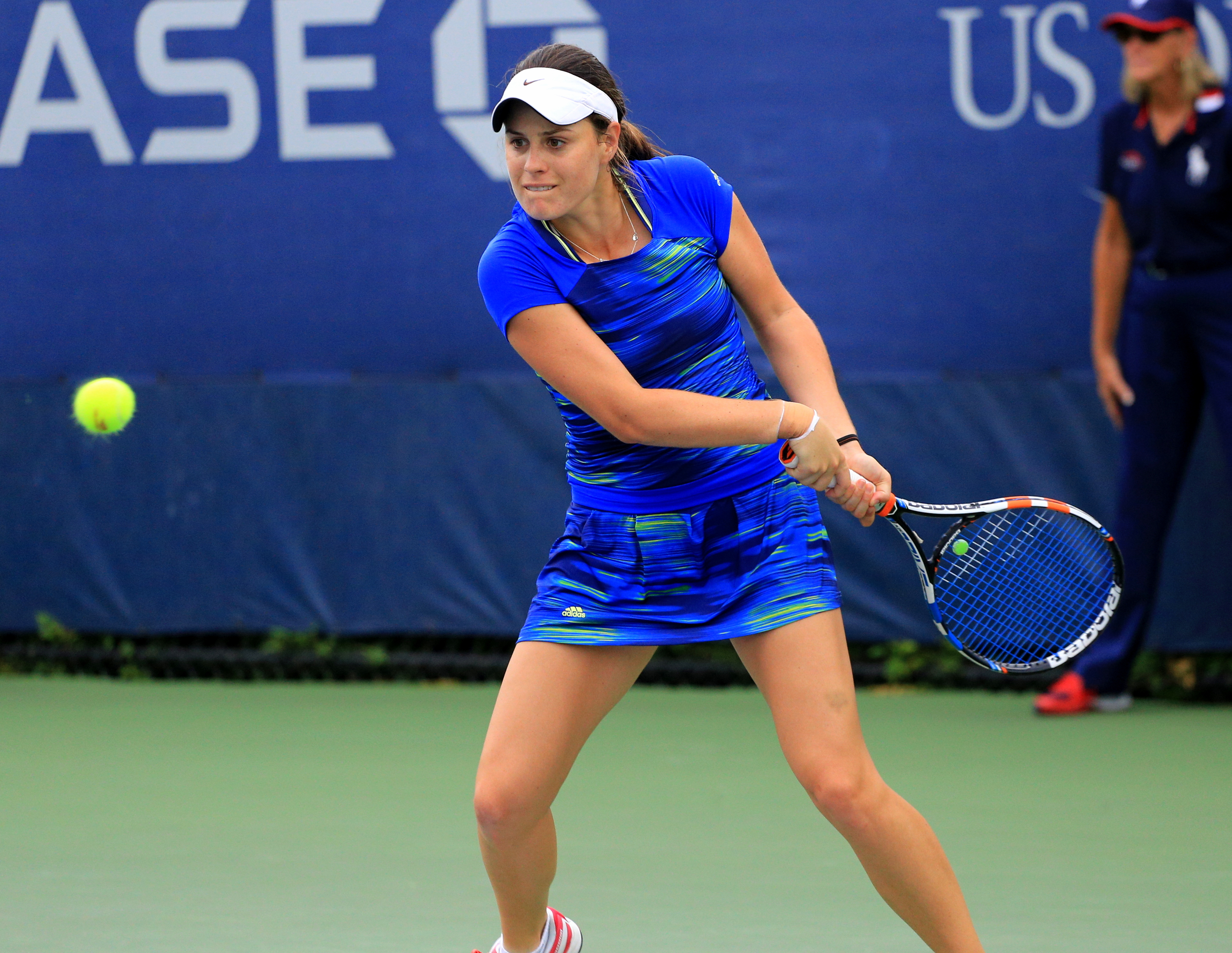
Birrell in 2015

In January 2015, Birrell was awarded a qualifying wildcard into the Hobart International, but lost to Vitalia Diatchenko in straight sets. She was then given a wildcard entry for the Australian Open qualifying, where she fell to Kateryna Bondarenko in three sets. Birrell also made her major main-draw debut at the event, after getting one of seven team wildcards in women's doubles, alongside Priscilla Hon, but lost in the first round to the fifth seeds, Raquel Kops-Jones and Abigail Spears.

In March 2015, Birrell qualified for and made the first ITF Circuit final of her career in Mildura, but lost to compatriot Alison Bai in straight sets.

=== 2016: Major & WTA Tour singles debuts, first WTA doubles final ===
Birrell was awarded a wildcard into the qualifying rounds of the Brisbane International, but lost to Samantha Crawford.

She made her WTA Tour debut after being awarded a wildcard into the main-draw at the Hobart International. She won in straight sets against world No. 57, Danka Kovinić, before losing to Dominika Cibulková in the second round. At the same tournament, she partnered Jarmila Wolfe in the doubles where they made the final, but were defeated by Han Xinyun and Christina McHale.

Birrell was awarded a wildcard into the Australian Open but she lost in the first round to ninth seed Karolína Plíšková.

In February, Birrell made her Fed Cup debut for Australia against Slovakia at the age of 17. She lost to Dominika Cibulková in straight sets. Shortly afterwards, she suffered a right elbow injury, sidelining her for the rest of the year.

=== 2017–18: First ITF Circuit singles title ===
Birrell and Priscilla Hon were given a wildcard entry into the doubles at the 2017 Australian Open, losing in the first round to Sam Stosur and Zhang Shuai.

At the end of September 2017, she reached the final at the Penrith International, losing to Olivia Rogowska. The following week in Brisbane, Birrell won her first ITF singles title by defeating Asia Muhammad in three sets.

Birrell won her second ITF singles title at the 2018 Darwin Tennis International.

In December 2018, she won the Australian Open Wildcard Playoffs.

=== 2019–20: Australian Open third round, first top-10 win, injury and hiatus ===
Birrell started 2019 with a wildcard entry into the Brisbane International, where she claimed her first top 10 win over Daria Kasatkina, before losing to Lesia Tsurenko in the second round.

At the Australian Open, Birrell defeated Paula Badosa in round one, earning her first Grand Slam main-draw win, before overcoming the 29th seed Donna Vekić in the second round. She lost her third round match against three time major champion and second seed, Angelique Kerber, in straight sets.

In February, she played for Australia against the United States in the first round of the 2019 Fed Cup World Group, losing to Madison Keys, although Australia won the tie.

Birrell lost in the first round of qualifying at Wimbledon, which proved to be her last competitive match for over a year due to an elbow injury.

=== 2021–22: Second hiatus and comeback ===
Birrell played her first competitive match in 19 months at the 2021 Yarra Valley Classic where she lost in round one to Mona Barthel.

She was given a wildcard into the 2021Australian Open, where she lost in the first round to Rebecca Marino. In February 2021, she made the third round of the Phillip Island Trophy, at which point she lost to fourth seed Petra Martić. It would be her final tournament for the year.

In January 2022, she played her first professional match in eleven months, at the Melbourne Summer Set 1, where she defeated Martina Trevisan before losing to Lesley Pattinama Kerkhove in the final qualifying round.

Birrell then made the final round of the 2022 Australian Open qualifying.

=== 2023: WTA 250 doubles final, top 100, Australian No. 1 ===
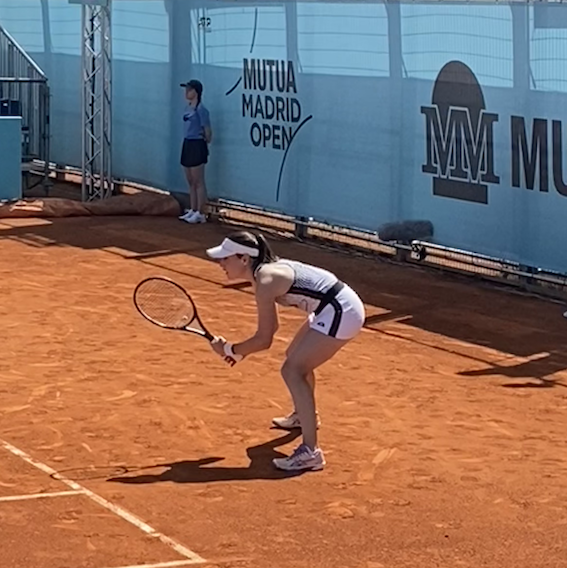
Birrell at the Madrid Open in 2023

At the Australian Open, she received a wildcard into the main draw, after the withdrawal of Venus Williams, and defeated 31st seed Kaia Kanepi in a three-set match lasting two hours and 32 minutes. It was her first Grand Slam tournament main-draw win in four years, the third top-30 career win and the fourth top-50 one.

She reached a new career-high ranking of 136 on 13 February 2023, following her fourth ITF title.

At the Mérida Open, she reached her first WTA Tour quarterfinal as a qualifier, but lost to Caty McNally, She achieved a new career-high of 116 on 27 February 2023. At the Monterrey Open, she made her second WTA Tour doubles final, partnering Fernanda Contreras Gómez, after receiving a wildcard.

Birrell made her WTA 1000 debut in Indian Wells as a qualifier, losing to Sorana Cîrstea in the first round. She also made her debut at the French Open as a wildcard, but again fell at the first hurdle, this time to fellow wildcard entrant Leolia Jeanjean.

In August, Birrell made her US Open debut as a lucky loser, but was defeated in the opening round by Jennifer Brady. After reaching the semifinals at the $100k event in Tokyo, she reached the top 100 on 18 September 2023.

=== 2024: First WTA Tour final ===
Birrell was awarded a wildcard into the Australian Open in singles and doubles. In singles, she lost in the first round to Jeļena Ostapenko. In doubles, she partnered Olivia Gadecki, and together they scored a win over Sabrina Santamaria and Varvara Gracheva in straight sets. In the second round, the All-Aussie duo lost to eventual runners-up, Lyudmyla Kichenok and Jeļena Ostapenko.

At the Nottingham Open, Birrell made her second career singles quarterfinal and her first on grass. She defeated Emily Appleton for her first main-draw win of the 2024 season, and then overcame Lucrezia Stefanini before losing to Diane Parry.

Birrell qualified for the main-draw of the US Open, losing to 24th seed Donna Vekić in the first round.

She also qualified for the WTA 1000 China Open, making her debut at this tournament, but lost in the first round to lucky loser Kamilla Rakhimova who she had defeated in the final qualifying round three days earlier.

In October, Birrell qualified for the Japan Women's Open and then defeated Zheng Saisai, third seed Elise Mertens, wildcard entrant Sara Saito and Aoi Ito to reach her first WTA Tour final where she lost in straight sets to fellow qualifier Suzan Lamens.

=== 2025: Major mixed doubles final ===
Birrell began her 2025 season at the Brisbane International, where she received a wildcard entry and defeated qualifier Priscilla Hon, second seed Emma Navarro and Anastasia Potapova to reach the quarterfinals, at which point her run was ended by Anhelina Kalinina.

Birrell qualified for the Australian Open, but lost in the round to lucky loser Eva Lys, after her scheduled opponent, 13th seed Anna Kalinskaya, withdrew just minutes before their match was due to get underway. Partnering John-Patrick Smith, she reached the mixed doubles final, losing to John Peers and Olivia Gadecki.

Entering as a wildcard at the Singapore Open, Birrell defeated fifth seed Polina Kudermetova and Hailey Baptiste to make it through to the quarterfinals, where she lost to Ann Li.

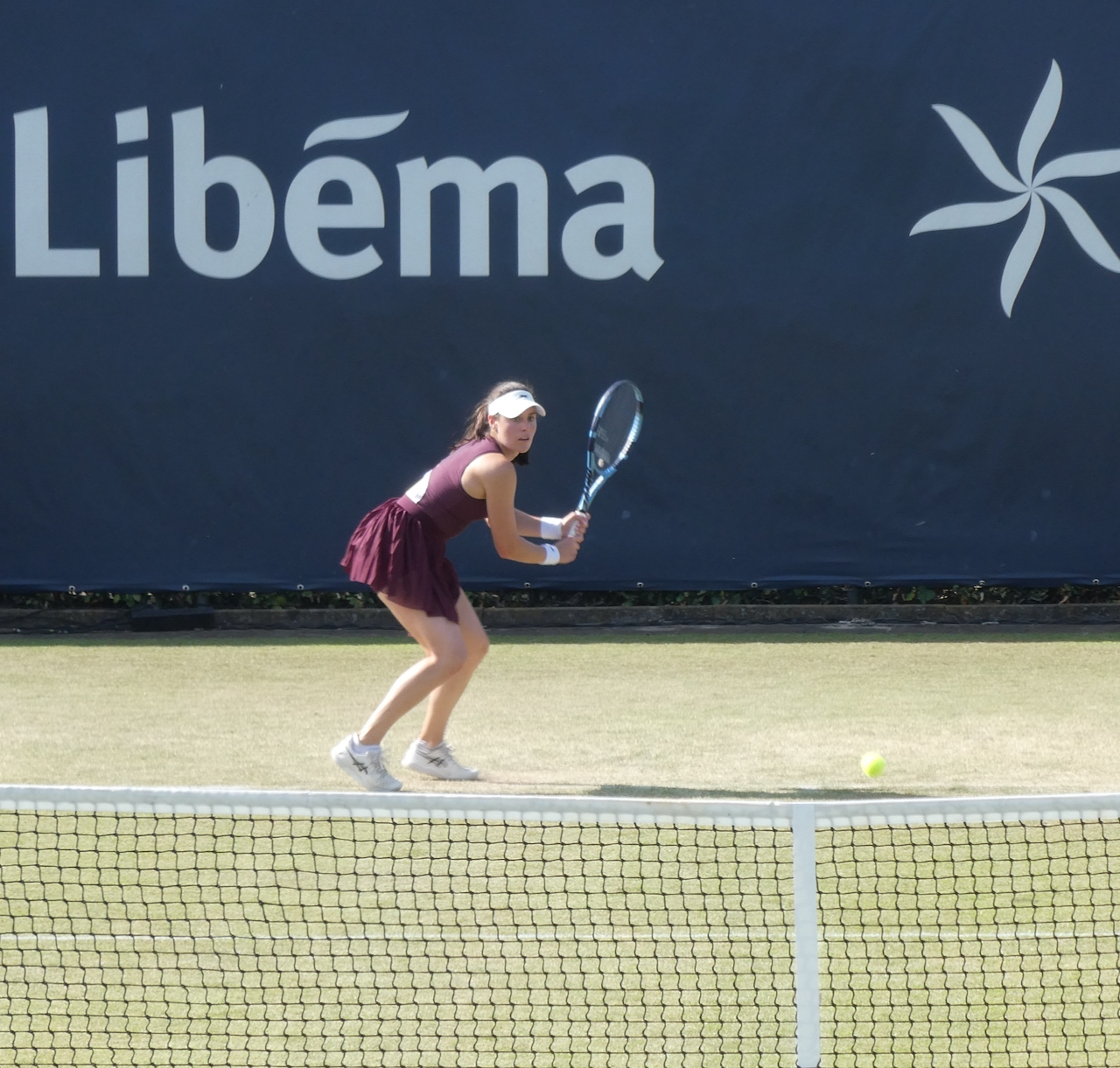
Birrell at the 2025 Rosmalen Open

Birrell won the W75 Brisbane QTC International, defeating Maddison Inglis in the final. As a result, she moved up 11 places in the WTA rankings to a career-high of world No. 75 on 10 February 2025.

At the ATX Open, she defeated fourth seed and defending champion Yuan Yue in the first round, before losing to qualifier Ena Shibahara.

In March, Birrell qualified for the Miami Open and defeated Anastasia Potapova to reach the second round, where she lost to 23rd seed Marta Kostyuk.

Seeded seventh at the Chennai Open in October, she recorded wins over Nikola Bartůňková, wildcard entrant Shrivalli Bhamidipaty and third seed Donna Vekić to make it through to the semifinals, where she defeated Joanna Garland, winning seven games in succession from 0–5 down in the third set and saving five match points in the process, to reach her second WTA Tour final. She lost the championship match to fourth seed Janice Tjen in straight sets.

Playing for Australia in the BJK Cup play-offs in Hobart, Birrell recorded wins over Matilde Jorge and Naná Silva as her team defeated Portugal and Brazil respectively to top their group and advance to the 2026 qualifying round.

=== 2026: First WTA title, top 50 ===
Birrell reached her first WTA 500 semifinal at the Adelaide International with a win over Anastasia Potapova, a walkover against Markéta Vondroušová and then defeating Jaqueline Cristian, before her run was ended in the last four by eighth seed Victoria Mboko.

Having moved back into the world's top-100, she gained direct entry into the Australian Open, but lost in the first round to fellow Australian, qualifier Maddison Inglis, in three sets. At the same tournament, Birrell reached the quarterfinals in the doubles partnering compatriot Talia Gibson, defeating second seeds Sara Errani and Jasmine Paolini in the second round, then 16th seeds Kristina Mladenovic and Guo Hanyu in the third, before losing to Ena Shibahara and Vera Zvonareva in the last eight.

In February, Birrell qualified for the Dubai Open and overcame Tatjana Maria to make it through to the second round, at which point she lost to top seed Elena Rybakina. The following week at the ATX Open, she recorded wins over eighth seed Petra Marčinko, qualifier Caroline Dolehide and fellow Australian Ajla Tomljanović to reach the semifinals, where she lost to fourth seed Peyton Stearns.

At the WTA 1000 tournament in Indian Wells, Birrell defeated Tatjana Maria in a three-set match lasting almost three hours, before losing to 10th seed Victoria Mboko in the second round.

In April, Birrell was part of the Australian squad for their BJK Cup qualifier against Great Britain in Melbourne. She lost to Harriet Dart in three sets.

At the French Open, she fought back from being a set and break of serve behind to defeat fifth seed Jessica Pegula in three sets for her first win at this major and third victory over a top 10 ranked opponent. Birrell lost in the second round to Oleksandra Oliynykova in a match which went to a third set tiebreak. The following month at Wimbledon she overcame qualifier Alina Korneeva in three sets for her first win at this major, before losing to 17th seed Sorana Cîrstea in the second round.

At the US Open, Birrell defeated Petra Marčinko for her first match win at this major at her fourth attempt, before losing to 18th seed Ekaterina Alexandrova in the second round. Despite her defeat, she reached a new career-high WTA singles ranking of world No. 56 on 14 September 2026.

Seeded second at the Korea Open, Birrell recorded wins over Tamara Zidanšek, Ma Yexin, Katie Volynets.and sixth seed Anna Bondár to reach the final, where she defeated fellow Australian and fifth seed Maya Joint to claim her maiden WTA Tour singles title and break into the world's top 50 for the first time in the process. Having entered the tournament as world No. 60, she moved up 19 places in the WTA rankings as a result of her trophy winning run to a new career-best of No. 41 on 28 September 2026.

== Performance timelines ==
Key
W	F	SF	QF	#R	RR	Q#	P#	DNQ	A	Z#	PO	G	S	B	NMS	NTI	P	NH

(W) winner; (F) finalist; (SF) semifinalist; (QF) quarterfinalist; (#R) rounds 4, 3, 2, 1; (RR) round-robin stage; (Q#) qualification round; (P#) preliminary round; (DNQ) did not qualify; (A) absent; (Z#) Davis/Fed Cup Zonal Group (with number indication) or (PO) play-off; (G) gold, (S) silver or (B) bronze Olympic/Paralympic medal; (NMS) not a Masters tournament; (NTI) not a Tier I tournament; (P) postponed; (NH) not held; (SR) strike rate (events won / competed); (W–L) win–loss record.
To avoid confusion and double counting, these charts are updated at the conclusion of a tournament or when the player's participation has ended.

Only main-draw results in WTA Tour, Grand Slam tournaments, Billie Jean King Cup, United Cup, Hopman Cup and Olympic Games are included in win–loss records.

=== Singles ===
Current through the 2026 Korea Open.

Tournament	2015	2016	2017	2018	2019	2020	2021	2022	2023	2024	2025	2026	SR	W–L	Win%
Grand Slam tournaments
Australian Open	Q1	1R	A	Q1	3R	A	1R	Q3	2R	1R	1R	1R	0 / 7	3–7	30%
French Open	A	A	A	A	Q1	A	A	A	1R	Q2	1R	2R	0 / 3	1–3	25%
Wimbledon	A	A	A	A	Q1	NH	A	A	Q1	Q2	1R	2R	0 / 2	1–2	33%
US Open	A	A	A	A	A	A	A	Q2	1R	1R	1R	2R	0 / 4	1–4	20%
Win–loss	0–0	0–1	0–0	0–0	2–1	0–0	0–1	0–0	1–3	0–2	0–4	3–4	0 / 16	6–16	27%
National representation
Billie Jean King Cup (Note: Formerly known as Fed Cup until 2020.)	A	PO	A	A	F	A (Note: Edition is split into the two years due to COVID-19.)		A	RR	QF	QR		0 / 4	3–4	43%
WTA 1000 tournaments
Qatar Open	NTI	A	NTI	A	NTI	A	NTI	A	A	Q1	A	Q2	0 / 0	0–0	–
Dubai Open	A	NTI	A	NTI	A	NTI	A	NTI	A	A	A	2R	0 / 1	1–1	50%
Indian Wells Open	A	A	A	A	A	NH	A	A	1R	A	2R	2R	0 / 3	2–3	40%
Miami Open	A	A	A	A	A	NH	A	A	Q1	A	2R	1R	0 / 2	1–2	33%
Madrid Open	A	A	A	A	A	NH	A	A	Q2	A	1R	1R	0 / 2	0–2	0%
Italian Open	A	A	A	A	A	NH	A	A	Q1	A	1R	Q1	0 / 1	0–1	0%
Canadian Open	A	A	A	A	A	NH	A	Q1	1R	Q1	1R	1R	0 / 3	0–3	0%
Cincinnati Open	A	A	A	A	A	A	A	A	A	A	2R	1R	0 / 2	1–2	33%
China Open	A	A	A	A	A	Not held			Q1	1R	1R		0 / 2	0–2	0%
Wuhan Open	A	A	A	A	A	Not held				A	Q2		0 / 0	0–0	–
Win–loss	0–0	0–0	0–0	0–0	0–0	0–0	0–0	0–0	0–2	0–1	3–7	2–6	0 / 16	5–16	24%
Career statistics
	2015	2016	2017	2018	2019	2020	2021	2022	2023	2024	2025	2026	SR	W–L	Win%
Tournaments	0	2	0	0	2	0	3	1	10	10	18	9	Career total: 53		
Titles	0	0	0	0	0	0	0	0	0	0	0	1	Career total: 1		
Finals	0	0	0	0	0	0	0	0	0	1	1	1	Career total: 3		
Overall win–loss	0–0	1–3	0–0	0–0	3–3	0–0	2–3	1–1	8–10	7–10	16–20	9–9	0 / 55	47–59	44%
Year-end ranking (Note: 2013: WTA ranking–818, 2014: WTA ranking–n/a.)	361	506	356	285	245	735	734	167	113	115	95		$3,141,312		

=== Doubles ===
Current through the 2025 US Open.

Tournament	2014	2015	2016	2017	2018	2019	2020	2021	2022	2023	2024	2025	SR	W–L	Win %
Grand Slam tournaments
Australian Open	A	1R	1R	1R	1R	1R	A	1R	2R	A	2R	3R	0 / 9	4–9	
French Open	A	A	A	A	A	A	A	A	A	A	A	1R	0 / 1	0–1	
Wimbledon	A	A	A	A	A	A	NH	A	A	A	A	3R	0 / 1	2–1	
US Open	A	A	A	A	A	A	A	A	A	A	A	1R	0 / 1	0–1	
Win–loss	0–0	0–1	0–1	0–1	0–1	0–1	0–0	0–1	1–1	0–0	1–1	4–4	0 / 12	6–12	
Career statistics
Tournaments	1	1	2	1	1	1	0	1	3	2	1	4	Career total: 18		
Titles	0	0	0	0	0	0	0	0	0	0	0	0	Career total: 0		
Finals	0	0	1	0	0	0	0	0	0	1	0	0	Career total: 2		
Overall win–loss	0–1	0–1	3–2	0–1	0–1	0–1	0–0	0–1	3–3	3–2	1–1	4–4	0 / 18	14–18	
Year-end ranking (Note: 2013: WTA ranking–1236.)	N/A	606	284	332	546	548	612	803	251	233	204	149			

=== Mixed doubles ===
Tournament	2016	2017	2018	2019	2020	2021	2022	2023	2024	2025	2026	SR	W–L
Australian Open	1R	A	A	A	A	A	A	2R	1R	F	1R	0 / 5	5–5
French Open	A	A	A	A	NH	A	A	A	A	A	A	0 / 0	0–0
Wimbledon	A	A	A	A	NH	A	A	A	A	A	A	0 / 0	0–0
US Open	A	A	A	A	NH	A	A	A	A	A	A	0 / 0	0–0
Win–loss	0–1	0–0	0–0	0–0	0–0	0–0	0–0	1–1	0–1	4–1	0–1	0 / 5	5–5

== Grand Slam tournament finals ==
=== Mixed doubles: 1 (runner-up) ===
Result	Year	Tournament	Surface	Partner	Opponents	Score
Loss	2025	Australian Open	Hard	(Australia) John-Patrick Smith	(Australia) Olivia Gadecki (Australia) John Peers	6–3, 4–6, [6–10]

== WTA Tour finals ==
=== Singles: 3 (1 title, 2 runner-ups) ===
Legend WTA 250 (1–2)	Finals by surface Hard (1–2)	Finals by setting Outdoor (1–2)

Result	W–L	Date	Tournament	Tier	Surface	Opponent	Score
Loss	0–1	Oct 2024	Japan Women's Open, Japan	WTA 250	Hard	(Netherlands) Suzan Lamens	0–6, 4–6
Loss	0–2	Oct 2025	Chennai Open, India	WTA 250	Hard	(Indonesia) Janice Tjen	4–6, 3–6
Win	1–2	Sep 2026	Korea Open, South Korea	WTA 250	Hard	(Australia) Maya Joint	6–4, 6–2

=== Doubles: 2 (2 runner-ups) ===
Legend International / WTA 250 (0–2)	Finals by surface Hard (0–2)	Finals by setting Outdoor (0–2)

Result	W–L	Date	Tournament	Tier	Surface	Partner	Opponents	Score
Loss	0–1	Jan 2016	Hobart International, Australia	International	Hard	(Australia) Jarmila Wolfe	(China) Han Xinyun (United States) Christina McHale	3–6, 0–6
Loss	0–2	Mar 2023	Monterrey Open, Mexico	WTA 250	Hard	(Mexico) Fernanda C. Gómez	(Colombia) Yuliana Lizarazo (Colombia) María Paulina Pérez	3–6, 7–5, [5–10]

== ITF Circuit finals ==
=== Singles: 12 (7 titles, 5 runner-ups) ===
Legend $60,000 tournaments (5–0) $25,000 tournaments (2–4) $15,000 tournaments (0–1)	Finals by surface Hard (5–4) Grass (0–1) Carpet (2–0)

Result	W–L	Date	Tournament	Tier	Surface	Opponent	Score
Loss	0–1	Mar 2015	ITF Mildura, Australia	15,000	Grass	(Australia) Alison Bai	3–6, 3–6
Loss	0–2	Oct 2015	Brisbane QTC International, Australia	25,000	Hard	(Australia) Priscilla Hon	4–6, 3–6
Loss	0–3	Sep 2017	ITF Penrith, Australia	25,000	Hard	(Australia) Olivia Rogowska	2–6, 4–6
Win	1–3	Oct 2017	Brisbane QTC International, Australia	25,000	Hard	(United States) Asia Muhammad	4–6, 6–3, 6–2
Win	2–3	Sep 2018	Darwin International, Australia	60,000	Hard	(Australia) Ellen Perez	6–3, 6–3
Loss	2–4	Jul 2022	Figueira da Foz Open, Portugal	W25+H	Hard	(United States) Jamie Loeb	5–7, 4–6
Loss	2–5	Oct 2022	ITF Cairns, Australia	W25	Hard	(Australia) Priscilla Hon	6–4, 6–7^{(6)}, 4–6
Win	3–5	Oct 2022	Playford International, Australia	W60	Hard	(Australia) Maddison Inglis	3–6, 7–5, 6–4
Win	4–5	Feb 2023	ITF Orlando Pro, United States	W60	Hard	(Sweden) Rebecca Peterson	6–3, 6–0
Win	5–5	Jul 2023	ITF Cantanhede, Portugal	W25	Carpet	(Australia) Arina Rodionova	4–6, 6–3, 6–1
Win	6–5	May 2024	Fukuoka International, Japan	W75	Carpet	(United States) Emina Bektas	6–2, 6–4
Win	7–5	Feb 2025	Brisbane QTC International, Australia	W75	Hard	(Australia) Maddison Inglis	6–2, 4–6, 7–6^{(2)}

=== Doubles: 7 (2 titles, 5 runner-ups) ===
Legend $100,000 tournaments (1–1) $60,000 tournaments (0–1) $25,000 tournaments (0–3) $10,000 tournaments (1–0)	Finals by surface Hard (2–5)

Result	W–L	Date	Tournament	Tier	Surface	Partner	Opponents	Score
Win	1–0	Sep 2015	ITF Tweed Heads, Australia	10,000	Hard	(Australia) Tammi Patterson	(Hungary) Dalma Gálfi (Australia) Priscilla Hon	6–7^{(3)}, 6–3, [10–8]
Loss	1–1	Jul 2017	Winnipeg Challenger, Canada	25,000	Hard	(United States) Caroline Dolehide	(Japan) Hiroko Kuwata (Russia) Valeria Savinykh	4–6, 6–7^{(4)}
Loss	1–2	Jul 2017	Challenger de Gatineau, Canada	25,000	Hard	(United Kingdom) Emily Webley-Smith	(Japan) Hiroko Kuwata (Russia) Valeria Savinykh	6–4, 3–6, [5–10]
Loss	1–3	Sep 2018	Darwin International, Australia	60,000	Hard	(United Kingdom) Katy Dunne	(Japan) Hiroko Kuwata (India) Rutuja Bhosale	2–6, 4–6
Loss	1–4	May 2022	ITF Nottingham, United Kingdom	W25	Hard	(Australia) Alexandra Osborne	(United Kingdom) Naiktha Bains (United Kingdom) Maia Lumsden	6–3, 6–7^{(6)}, [9–11]
Win	2–4	Apr 2024	Tokyo Open, Japan	W100	Hard	(South Korea) Jang Su-jeong	(Serbia) Aleksandra Krunić (Australia) Arina Rodionova	7–5, 3–6, [10–8]
Loss	2–5	May 2024	Kangaroo Cup Gifu, Japan	W100	Hard	(Canada) Rebecca Marino	(Chinese Taipei) Liang En-shuo (China) Tang Qianhui	6–0, 6–3

== Wins against top-10 players ==
- Birrell's match record against players who were, at the time the match was played, ranked in the top 10.

No.	Player	Rk	Event	Surface	Rd	Score	Rk	Years	Ref
1	(Russia) Daria Kasatkina	10	Brisbane International, Australia	Hard	1R	5–7, 6–4, 7–6^{(3)}	283	2019	
2	(United States) Emma Navarro	8	Brisbane International, Australia	Hard	2R	7–5, 7–5	113	2025	
3	(United States) Jessica Pegula	5	French Open, France	Clay	1R	1–6, 6–3, 6–3	83	2026	

- Key: (Rk) first use, opponent rank; (Rd) round; (Rk) 2nd use, player rank; (Ref) reference; (F) final; (SF) semifinal; (QF) quarterfinal; (#R) rounds 4, 3, 2, 1; (RR) round-robin stage; (Q#) qualifying rounds or stages (3), 2, 1.
