= Alison Bai =

Australian tennis player

- Country (sports): Australia
- Born: 18 January 1990 (age 36) Canberra
- Height: 1.69 m (5 ft 7 in)
- Turned pro: 2005
- Plays: Right (two-handed backhand)
- Prize money: $214,084

Singles
- Career record: 266–297
- Career titles: 1 ITF
- Highest ranking: No. 305 (2 November 2015)

Grand Slam singles results
- Australian Open: Q1 (2007, 2008)

Doubles
- Career record: 266–262
- Career titles: 13 ITF
- Highest ranking: No. 125 (20 January 2020)

Grand Slam doubles results
- Australian Open: 2R (2019)

Alison Bai (born 18 January 1990) is an Australian former tennis player. Her highest WTA singles ranking is No. 305, which she reached on 2 November 2015. Her career-high in doubles is 125, set on 20 January 2020.

== Early life ==
Bai first began playing tennis at age 6. By age 9, she had won her first tournament. That year, her mother died of cancer.

== Career ==
On the ITF Circuit, Bai won her first singles title in 2015 at the $15k event on grass in Mildura having reached the final the previous year. In 2018, she reached the final of the $25k event in Changsha, China, defeating top seed Zhu Lin in the second round.

She has also won thirteen doubles titles on the ITF Circuit, including two titles at $60k tournaments in Canberra (with Zoe Hives in 2017) and Baotou (with Aleksandrina Naydenova in 2018). In 2018, she achieved her best result on the WTA Tour, reaching the doubles semifinal of the Hobart International, partnering Lizette Cabrera. In 2019, she played her sixth Australian Open. There, she won the doubles wildcard.

In 2021, Bai became the full-time carer for her father, who had become ill after suffering a series of strokes while accompanying her on tour. In November 2021, Bai took a position as Women and Girls Lead at Tennis ACT.

In 2020, paired with Jaimee Fourlis, Bai won the women’s doubles title at the Apis Canberra International (Bendigo).

== ITF Circuit finals ==
=== Singles: 3 (1 title, 2 runner-ups) ===
Legend $25,000 tournaments (0–1) $15,000 tournaments (1–1)	Finals by surface Hard (0–1) Grass (1–1)

Result	W–L	Date	Tournament	Tier	Surface	Opponent	Score
Loss	0–1	Mar 2014	ITF Mildura, Australia	15,000	Grass	(South Korea) Jang Su-jeong	1–6, 3–6
Win	1–1	Mar 2015	ITF Mildura, Australia	15,000	Grass	(Australia) Kimberly Birrell	6–3, 6–3
Loss	1–2	Jun 2018	ITF Changsha, China	25,000	Hard	(China) Han Xinyun	5–7, 6–0, 4–6

=== Doubles: 34 (13 titles, 21 runner-ups) ===
Legend $50/$60,000 tournaments (2–6) $25,000 tournaments (7–10) $15,000 tournaments (0–1) $10,000 tournaments (4–4)	Finals by surface Hard (9–18) Clay (4–1) Grass (0–1) Carpet (0–1)

Result	W–L	Date	Tournament	Tier	Surface	Partner	Opponents	Score
Loss	0–1	Oct 2005	ITF Lyneham, Australia	25,000	Clay	(Australia) Jenny Swift	(Australia) Casey Dellacqua (Australia) Daniella Jeflea	4–6, 3–6
Loss	0–2	Oct 2007	ITF Rockhampton, Australia	25,000	Hard	(Australia) Jessica Moore	(United States) Courtney Nagle (United States) Robin Stephenson	4–6, 3–6
Loss	0–3	Mar 2008	ITF Hamilton, New Zealand	10,000	Hard	(Australia) Emelyn Starr	(Japan) Maki Arai (Japan) Yurina Koshino	6–7^{(3)}, 6–7^{(2)}
Loss	0–4	Mar 2009	ITF North Shore City, New Zealand	10,000	Hard	(Australia) Renee Binnie	(South Korea) Kim So-jung (Japan) Ayaka Maekawa	5–7, 6–7^{(4)}
Loss	0–5	Aug 2009	ITF Qianshan, China	10,000	Hard	(Australia) Sacha Jones	(China) Liang Chen (China) Sun Shengnan	2–6, 4–6
Loss	0–6	Sep 2010	ITF Alice Springs, Australia	25,000	Hard	(Australia) Emelyn Starr	(Japan) Erika Sema (Japan) Yurika Sema	5–7, 1–6
Win	1–6	Oct 2010	ITF Mount Gambier, Australia	25,000	Hard	(Brazil) Ana Clara Duarte	(Indonesia) Ayu Fani Damayanti (Indonesia) Jessy Rompies	w/o
Loss	1–7	Sep 2012	ITF Salisbury, Australia	10,000	Hard	(Australia) Sally Peers	(Indonesia) Ayu Fani Damayanti (Indonesia) Lavinia Tananta	6–7^{(5)}, 0–6
Win	2–7	Mar 2013	ITF Sydney, Australia	10,000	Hard	(Australia) Tyra Calderwood	(Australia) Anja Dokic (Australia) Jessica Moore	7–6^{(3)}, 6–4
Win	3–7	Aug 2014	ITF Nottingham, UK	10,000	Hard	(Japan) Mari Tanaka	(United Kingdom) Katie Boulter (United Kingdom) Freya Christie	6–4, 6–3
Win	4–7	Aug 2014	ITF Oldenzaal, Netherlands	10,000	Clay	(China) Lu Jiajing	(Belgium) Elyne Boeykens (Netherlands) Jainy Scheepens	3–6, 6–4, [10–6]
Win	5–7	Aug 2014	ITF Rotterdam, Netherlands	10,000	Clay	(Sweden) Cornelia Lister	(France) Brandy Mina (Netherlands) Jainy Scheepens	7–5, 6–4
Loss	5–8	Oct 2014	ITF Cairns, Australia	15,000	Hard	(Japan) Ayaka Okuno	(Australia) Jessica Moore (Australia) Abbie Myers	2–6, 2–6
Loss	5–9	Feb 2016	ITF Perth, Australia	25,000	Hard	(Australia) Abbie Myers	(Australia) Ashleigh Barty (Australia) Jessica Moore	6–3, 4–6, [8–10]
Loss	5–10	Jun 2016	Surbiton Trophy, UK	50,000	Grass	(United States) Robin Anderson	(United States) Sanaz Marand (United States) Melanie Oudin	4–6, 5–7
Win	6–10	Oct 2016	ITF Cairns, Australia	25,000	Hard	(Australia) Lizette Cabrera	(Poland) Katarzyna Kawa (Poland) Sandra Zaniewska	7–5, 5–7, [12–10]
Loss	6–11	Oct 2016	Canberra International, Australia	50,000	Hard	(Australia) Lizette Cabrera	(Australia) Jessica Moore (Australia) Storm Sanders	3–6, 4–6
Loss	6–12	Feb 2017	Burnie International, Australia	60,000	Hard	(Thailand) Varatchaya Wongteanchai	(Japan) Riko Sawayanagi (Czech Republic) Barbora Štefková	6–7^{(6)}, 6–4, [7–10]
Loss	6–13	Feb 2017	ITF Clare, Australia	25,000	Hard	(Japan) Erika Sema	(Brazil) Beatriz Haddad Maia (Australia) Genevieve Lorbergs	4–6, 3–6
Win	7–13	Jun 2017	ITF Wuhan, China	25,000	Hard	(China) Lu Jiajing	(China) Jiang Xinyu (China) Tang Qianhui	6–2, 7–6^{(3)}
Win	8–13	Nov 2017	Bendigo International, Australia	60,000	Hard	(Australia) Zoe Hives	(United States) Asia Muhammad (Australia) Arina Rodionova	4–6, 6–4, [10–8]
Loss	8–14	Feb 2018	ITF Perth, Australia	25,000	Hard	(China) Lu Jiajing	(Australia) Jessica Moore (Australia) Olivia Tjandramulia	5–7, 7–6^{(8)}, [9–11]
Win	9–14	May 2018	ITF Baotou, China	60,000	Clay	(Bulgaria) Aleksandrina Naydenova	(Serbia) Natalija Kostić (Russia) Nika Kukharchuk	6–4, 0–6, [10–6]
Loss	9–15	Jun 2018	ITF Luzhou, China	25,000	Hard	(Romania) Andreea Roșca	(China) Han Xinyun (China) Lu Jingjing	3–6, 3–6
Win	10–15	Mar 2019	Clay Court International, Australia	25,000	Clay	(Australia) Jaimee Fourlis	(Australia) Naiktha Bains (Slovakia) Tereza Mihalíková	6–2, 6–2
Loss	10–16	May 2019	Fukuoka International, Japan	60,000	Carpet	(United States) Kristie Ahn	(United Kingdom) Naomi Broady (United Kingdom) Heather Watson	w/o
Win	11–16	Jul 2019	ITF Corroios, Portugal	25,000	Hard	(New Zealand) Paige Hourigan	(Portugal) Francisca Jorge (Spain) Olga Parres Azcoitia	3–6, 6–2, [14–12]
Loss	11–17	Sep 2019	Darwin International, Australia	60,000	Hard	(Australia) Jaimee Fourlis	(Australia) Destanee Aiava (Australia) Lizette Cabrera	4–6, 6–2, [3–10]
Loss	11–18	Oct 2019	ITF Brisbane, Australia	25,000	Hard	(New Zealand) Paige Hourigan	(Australia) Destanee Aiava (United Kingdom) Naiktha Bains	3–6, 3–6
Win	12–18	Jan 2020	Canberra International, Australia (Note: Tournament was moved from Canberra to Bendigo due to the smoke affecting Canberra from the 2019–20 Australian bushfire season.)	25,000	Hard	(Australia) Jaimee Fourlis	(Hungary) Anna Bondár (Turkey) Pemra Özgen	5–7, 6–4, [10–8]
Win	13–18	Feb 2020	Launceston International, Australia	25,000	Hard	(Australia) Jaimee Fourlis	(Australia) Alicia Smith (Papua New Guinea) Abigail Tere-Apisah	7–6^{(4)}, 6–3
Loss	13–19	Jan 2022	Bendigo International, Australia	60,000+H	Hard	(Australia) Alana Parnaby	(Mexico) Fernanda Contreras (United States) Alycia Parks	3–6, 1–6
Loss	13–20	Feb 2022	ITF Canberra, Australia	25,000	Hard	(Australia) Jaimee Fourlis	(United States) Asia Muhammad (Australia) Arina Rodionova	3–6, 6–3, [6–10]
Loss	13–21	Feb 2022	ITF Canberra, Australia	25,000	Hard	(Australia) Jaimee Fourlis	(United States) Asia Muhammad (Australia) Arina Rodionova	6–7^{(2)}, 6–7^{(5)}
