= 2014 Bendigo Women's International (1) =

- Date: 3–9 November
- Edition: 7th (1st of 2014)
- Category: ITF Women's Circuit
- Prize money: $50,000
- Surface: Hard
- Location: Bendigo, Australia
- Venue: Bendigo Tennis Association

Champions

Singles
- (Japan) Eri Hozumi

Doubles
- (Australia) Jessica Moore / (Australia) Abbie Myers
← 2013 ·	Bendigo Women's International (1)	· 2014 →

The 2014 Bendigo Women's International (1) was a professional tennis tournament played on outdoor hard courts. It was the 7th edition of the tournament which was part of the 2014 ITF Women's Circuit, offering a total of $50,000 in prize money. It took place in Bendigo, Australia, on 3–9 November 2014. This was the first of two Bendigo events, the second tournament was held a week later.

== Singles entrants ==
=== Seeds ===
Country	Player	Rank^{1}	Seed
JPN	Eri Hozumi	167	1
SWE	Rebecca Peterson	212	2
JPN	Risa Ozaki	222	3
FRA	Alizé Lim	226	4
RUS	Daria Gavrilova	236	5
CHN	Liu Fangzhou	243	6
CRO	Ema Mikulčić	250	7
THA	Noppawan Lertcheewakarn	262	8

- ^{1} Rankings as of 27 October 2014

=== Other entrants ===
The following players received wildcards into the singles main draw:

- (Australia) Naiktha Bains
- (Australia) Kimberly Birrell
- (Australia) Isabella Holland
- (Australia) Abbie Myers

The following players received entry from the qualifying draw:

- (Sweden) Ellen Allgurin
- (Japan) Mizuno Kijima
- (Japan) Mai Minokoshi
- (Germany) Laura Schaeder

The following player received entry with a protected ranking:

- (Russia) Ksenia Lykina

== Champions ==
=== Singles ===
- (Japan) Eri Hozumi def. (Japan) Risa Ozaki 7–6^{(7–5)}, 5–7, 6–2

=== Doubles ===
- (Australia) Jessica Moore / (Australia) Abbie Myers def. (Australia) Naiktha Bains / (Australia) Karolina Wlodarczak 6–4, 6–0
