= 2014 Bendigo Women's International (2) – Doubles =

Doubles
- 2014 Bendigo Women's International (2)

Final
- Champions: (Australia) Jessica Moore (Australia) Abbie Myers
- Runners-up: (Thailand) Varatchaya Wongteanchai (Thailand) Varunya Wongteanchai
- Score: 3–6, 6–1, [10–6]

Events
Singles	Doubles
← 2013 ·	Bendigo Women's International (2)	· 2015 →

Monique Adamczak and Olivia Rogowska were the defending champions, having won the event in 2013, however both players chose not to participate.

The Australian-duo Jessica Moore and Abbie Myers won the title, defeating Thai-sisters Varatchaya and Varunya Wongteanchai, 3–6, 6–1, [10–6].

== Seeds ==
1. (Japan) Eri Hozumi / (Japan) Misa Eguchi (quarterfinals)
2. (Thailand) Varatchaya Wongteanchai / (Thailand) Varunya Wongteanchai (final)
3. (Ukraine) Veronika Kapshay / (France) Alizé Lim (semifinals)
4. (Australia) Jessica Moore / (Australia) Abbie Myers (champions)

== Draw ==
=== Key ===
- Q = Qualifier
- WC = Wild card
- LL = Lucky loser
- Alt = Alternate
- SE = Special exempt
- PR = Protected ranking
- ITF = ITF entry
- JE = Junior exempt
- w/o = Walkover
- r = Retired
- d = Defaulted
- SR = Special ranking

First round
1	(Japan) E Hozumi (Japan) M Eguchi	6	6
WC	(Australia) K Birrell (Australia) I Holland	1	3
Q	(China) Z Yang (China) Y Zhang	6	6
(Bulgaria) D Evtimova (Croatia) T Mrdeža	3	4
4	(Australia) J Moore (Australia) A Myers	6	6
WC	(Australia) N Collie (Australia) A Sumner	0	0
(Japan) M Ozeki (South Africa) M Sammons	5	6	[10]
(Australia) S Peers (South Africa) C Simmonds	7	2	[3]
WC	(Australia) T Calderwood (Australia) K Ryan	0	3
(Kazakhstan) K Kerimbayeva (Russia) K Lykina	6	6
(Australia) A Bai (Japan) A Okuno	3	2
3	(Ukraine) V Kapshay (France) A Lim	6	6
(Australia) V Rajicic (Slovakia) Z Zlochová	6	6
Q	(Japan) N Hanatani (Hungary) N Totka	3	4
(Japan) N Hibino (Japan) E Sema	2	7^{7}	[5]
2	(Thailand) Vara Wongteanchai (Thailand) Varu Wongteanchai	6	6^{2}	[10]

Quarterfinals
1	(Japan) E Hozumi (Japan) M Eguchi	3	4
Q	(China) Z Yang (China) Y Zhang	6	6
4	(Australia) J Moore (Australia) A Myers	6	7^{7}
(Japan) M Ozeki (South Africa) M Sammons	4	6^{4}
(Kazakhstan) K Kerimbayeva (Russia) K Lykina
3	(Ukraine) V Kapshay (France) A Lim	w/o
(Australia) V Rajicic (Slovakia) Z Zlochová	1	4
2	(Thailand) Vara Wongteanchai (Thailand) Varu Wongteanchai	6	6

Semifinals
Q	(China) Z Yang (China) Y Zhang	4	5
4	(Australia) J Moore (Australia) A Myers	6	7
3	(Ukraine) V Kapshay (France) A Lim	6	4	[13]
2	(Thailand) Vara Wongteanchai (Thailand) Varu Wongteanchai	1	6	[15]

Final
4	(Australia) J Moore (Australia) A Myers	3	6	[10]
2	(Thailand) Vara Wongteanchai (Thailand) Varu Wongteanchai	6	1	[6]
