= 2014 Bendigo Women's International (1) – Doubles =

Doubles
- 2014 Bendigo Women's International (1)

Final
- Champions: (Australia) Jessica Moore (Australia) Abbie Myers
- Runners-up: (Australia) Naiktha Bains (Australia) Karolina Wlodarczak
- Score: 6–4, 6–0

Events
Singles	Doubles
← 2013 ·	Bendigo Women's International (1)	· 2015 →

Erika Sema and Yurika Sema were the defending champions, however, they chose not to participate.

Jessica Moore and Abbie Myers won the title, defeating Naiktha Bains and Karolina Wlodarczak in an all-Australian final, 6–4, 6–0.

== Seeds ==
1. (Japan) Eri Hozumi / (Thailand) Noppawan Lertcheewakarn (quarterfinals)
2. (Thailand) Varatchaya Wongteanchai / (Thailand) Varunya Wongteanchai (first round)
3. (Australia) Sally Peers / (South Africa) Chanel Simmonds (semifinals)
4. (Germany) Carolin Daniels / (Germany) Laura Schaeder (first round; withdrew)

== Draw ==
=== Key ===
- Q = Qualifier
- WC = Wild card
- LL = Lucky loser
- Alt = Alternate
- SE = Special exempt
- PR = Protected ranking
- ITF = ITF entry
- JE = Junior exempt
- w/o = Walkover
- r = Retired
- d = Defaulted
- SR = Special ranking

First round
1	(Japan) E Hozumi (Thailand) N Lertcheewakarn	6	6
(Chinese Taipei) W-h Hsu (China) Y Wang	1	4
Q	(Australia) T Calderwood (Australia) A Sumner	4	5
(Australia) V Rajicic (South Africa) M Sammons	6	7
4	(Germany) C Daniels (Germany) L Schaeder
WC	(Australia) N Bains (Australia) K Wlodarczak	w/o
(Australia) A Bai (Japan) A Okuno	7^{7}	6
(Japan) M Inoue (France) A Lim	6^{1}	2
(Ukraine) V Kapshay (Russia) K Lykina	6	4	[10]
(Sweden) S Celik (Kazakhstan) K Kerimbayeva	0	6	[6]
WC	(Australia) A Bozovic (Australia) A Svinos	0	1
3	(Australia) S Peers (South Africa) C Simmonds	6	6
Q	(China) Z Yang (China) Y Zhang	7	7^{7}
WC	(Australia) K Birrell (Australia) I Holland	5	6^{2}
(Australia) J Moore (Australia) A Myers	6	6
2	(Thailand) Vara Wongteanchai (Thailand) Varu Wongteanchai	2	1

Quarterfinals
1	(Japan) E Hozumi (Thailand) N Lertcheewakarn	3	6	[7]
(Australia) V Rajicic (South Africa) M Sammons	6	2	[10]
WC	(Australia) N Bains (Australia) K Wlodarczak	6	2	[10]
(Australia) A Bai (Japan) A Okuno	2	6	[5]
(Ukraine) V Kapshay (Russia) K Lykina	4	4
3	(Australia) S Peers (South Africa) C Simmonds	6	6
Q	(China) Z Yang (China) Y Zhang	6^{1}	4
(Australia) J Moore (Australia) A Myers	7^{7}	6

Semifinals
(Australia) V Rajicic (South Africa) M Sammons	4	4
WC	(Australia) N Bains (Australia) K Wlodarczak	6	6
3	(Australia) S Peers (South Africa) C Simmonds	3	1
(Australia) J Moore (Australia) A Myers	6	6

Final
WC	(Australia) N Bains (Australia) K Wlodarczak	4	0
(Australia) J Moore (Australia) A Myers	6	6
