= 2014 Bendigo Women's International (2) =

- Date: 10–16 November
- Edition: 8th (2nd of 2014)
- Category: ITF Women's Circuit
- Prize money: $50,000
- Surface: Hard
- Location: Bendigo, Australia
- Venue: Bendigo Tennis Association

Champions

Singles
- (China) Liu Fangzhou

Doubles
- (Australia) Jessica Moore / (Australia) Abbie Myers
← 2014 ·	Bendigo Women's International (2)	· 2015 →

The 2014 Bendigo Women's International (2) was a professional tennis tournament played on outdoor hard courts. It was the 8th edition of the tournament which was part of the 2014 ITF Women's Circuit, offering a total of $50,000 in prize money. It took place in Bendigo, Australia, on 10–16 November 2014. This was the second of two Bendigo events, the first tournament was held a week before.

== Singles entrants ==
=== Seeds ===
Country	Player	Rank^{1}	Seed
JPN	Misa Eguchi	130	1
JPN	Eri Hozumi	170	2
SWE	Rebecca Peterson	185	3
JPN	Nao Hibino	207	4
JPN	Risa Ozaki	220	5
RUS	Daria Gavrilova	233	6
JPN	Shuko Aoyama	231	7
FRA	Alizé Lim	237	8

- ^{1} Rankings as of 3 November 2014

=== Other entrants ===
The following players received wildcards into the singles main draw:

- (Australia) Alison Bai
- (Australia) Kimberly Birrell
- (Australia) Jessica Moore
- (Australia) Viktorija Rajicic

The following players received entry from the qualifying draw:

- (Sweden) Ellen Allgurin (withdrew; replaced by Ayaka Okuno)
- (China) Gao Xinyu
- (Australia) Abbie Myers
- (Japan) Michika Ozeki

The following player received entry into the singles main draw as a lucky loser:

- (Japan) Ayaka Okuno

The following player received entry with a protected ranking:

- (Russia) Ksenia Lykina

== Champions ==
=== Singles ===
- (China) Liu Fangzhou def. (Japan) Risa Ozaki 6–4, 6–3

=== Doubles ===
- (Australia) Jessica Moore / (Australia) Abbie Myers def. (Thailand) Varatchaya Wongteanchai / (Thailand) Varunya Wongteanchai 3–6, 6–1, [10–6]
