= 2014 Bendigo Women's International (2) – Singles =

Singles
- 2014 Bendigo Women's International (2)

Final
- Champion: (China) Liu Fangzhou
- Runner-up: (Japan) Risa Ozaki
- Score: 6–4, 6–3

Events
Singles	Doubles
← 2013 ·	Bendigo Women's International (2)	· 2015 →

Casey Dellacqua was the defending champion, having won the event in 2013, however she chose not to participate.

Liu Fangzhou won the title, defeating fifth seed Risa Ozaki in the final, 6–4, 6–3.

== Seeds ==
1. (Japan) Misa Eguchi (quarterfinals)
2. (Japan) Eri Hozumi (second round)
3. (Sweden) Rebecca Peterson (first round; retired)
4. (Japan) Nao Hibino (second round)
5. (Japan) Risa Ozaki (final)
6. (Japan) Shuko Aoyama (second round)
7. (Russia) Daria Gavrilova (second round)
8. (France) Alizé Lim (quarterfinals)

== Main draw ==
=== Key ===
- Q = Qualifier
- WC = Wild card
- LL = Lucky loser
- Alt = Alternate
- SE = Special exempt
- PR = Protected ranking
- ITF = ITF entry
- JE = Junior exempt
- w/o = Walkover
- r = Retired
- d = Defaulted
- SR = Special ranking

=== Finals ===
Semifinals
(China) Liu Fangzhou	7^{7}	6
(China) Yang Zhaoxuan	6^{4}	1
(Sweden) Susanne Celik	4	5
5	(Japan) Risa Ozaki	6	7

Final
(China) Liu Fangzhou	6	6
5	(Japan) Risa Ozaki	4	3

=== Top half ===
First round
1	(Japan) M Eguchi	6	6
WC	(Australia) V Rajicic	2	2
(Bulgaria) D Evtimova	6	6
(Thailand) N Lertcheewakarn	3	4
(China) F Liu	6	6
(Australia) Ar Rodionova	2	4
Q	(Australia) A Myers	3	6^{2}
7	(Russia) D Gavrilova	6	7^{7}
4	(Japan) N Hibino	6	6
Q	(China) X Gao	3	2
(China) Z Yang	7	3	6
Q	(Japan) M Ozeki	5	6	4
WC	(Australia) K Birrell	1	2
(Slovakia) Z Zlochová	6	6
(Japan) M Inoue	4	7	1
8	(France) A Lim	6	5	6

Second round
1	(Japan) M Eguchi	6	6
(Bulgaria) D Evtimova	4	3
(China) F Liu	4	6	6
7	(Russia) D Gavrilova	6	2	3
4	(Japan) N Hibino	4	3
(China) Z Yang	6	6
(Slovakia) Z Zlochová	1	0^{r}
8	(France) A Lim	6	0

Quarterfinals
1	(Japan) M Eguchi	4	6	6^{5}
(China) F Liu	6	2	7^{7}
(China) Z Yang	6	6
8	(France) A Lim	2	1

Semifinals
(China) F Liu	7^{7}	6
(China) Z Yang	6^{4}	1

=== Bottom half ===
First round
6	(Japan) S Aoyama	6	6
WC	(Australia) A Bai	2	1
(Japan) E Sema	4	4
WC	(Australia) J Moore	6	6
LL	(Japan) A Okuno	6	3
(Kazakhstan) K Kerimbayeva	0	0^{r}
(Sweden) S Celik	4	6	4
3	(Sweden) R Peterson	6	3	0^{r}
5	(Japan) R Ozaki	7	7^{8}
(South Africa) C Simmonds	5	6^{6}
(Croatia) E Mikulčić	6^{5}	6	6
(Croatia) T Mrdeža	7^{7}	1	2
(Thailand) V Wongteanchai	6	6
PR	(Russia) K Lykina	4	2
(Ukraine) V Kapshay	4	2
2	(Japan) E Hozumi	6	6

Second round
6	(Japan) S Aoyama	2	6^{6}
WC	(Australia) J Moore	6	7^{8}
LL	(Japan) A Okuno	1	5
(Sweden) S Celik	6	7
5	(Japan) R Ozaki	6	1	6
(Croatia) E Mikulčić	3	6	0
(Thailand) V Wongteanchai	7	6
2	(Japan) E Hozumi	5	3

Quarterfinals
WC	(Australia) J Moore	3	6	2
(Sweden) S Celik	6	3	6
5	(Japan) R Ozaki	6	6
(Thailand) V Wongteanchai	4	3

Semifinals
(Sweden) S Celik	4	5
5	(Japan) R Ozaki	6	7
