= 2015 Bendigo Women's International =

- Date: 9–15 November
- Edition: 9th
- Category: ITF Women's Circuit
- Prize money: $50,000
- Surface: Hard
- Location: Bendigo, Australia

Champions

Singles
- (Japan) Misa Eguchi

Doubles
- (United States) Lauren Embree / (United States) Asia Muhammad
← 2014 ·	Bendigo Women's International	· 2016 →

The 2015 Bendigo Women's International was a professional tennis tournament played on outdoor hard courts. It was the ninth edition of the tournament and part of the 2015 ITF Women's Circuit, offering a total of $50,000 in prize money. It took place in Bendigo, Australia, on 9–15 November 2015.

== Singles main draw entrants ==
=== Seeds ===
Country	Player	Rank^{1}	Seed
JPN	Eri Hozumi	176	1
NED	Cindy Burger	183	2
JPN	Misa Eguchi	201	3
CHN	Zhang Yuxuan	210	4
JPN	Hiroko Kuwata	228	5
SWE	Susanne Celik	243	6
JPN	Erika Sema	248	7
RUS	Natela Dzalamidze	252	8

- ^{1} Rankings as of 2 November 2015

=== Other entrants ===
The following players received wildcards into the singles main draw:

- (Australia) Destanee Aiava
- (Australia) Maddison Inglis
- (Australia) Olivia Tjandramulia

The following players received entry from the qualifying draw:

- (United States) Jennifer Elie
- (Australia) Masa Jovanovic
- (Japan) Mizuno Kijima
- (Australia) Tammi Patterson

The following player received entry using a protected ranking:

- (Belarus) Ilona Kremen

== Champions ==
=== Singles ===
- (Japan) Misa Eguchi def. (Japan) Hiroko Kuwata, 7–6^{(7–5)}, 6–3

=== Doubles ===
- (United States) Lauren Embree / (United States) Asia Muhammad def. (Russia) Natela Dzalamidze / (Japan) Hiroko Kuwata, 7–5, 6–3
