= 2014 Bendigo Women's International (1) – Singles =

Singles
- 2014 Bendigo Women's International (1)

Final
- Champion: (Japan) Eri Hozumi
- Runner-up: (Japan) Risa Ozaki
- Score: 7–6^{(7–5)}, 5–7, 6–2

Events
Singles	Doubles
← 2013 ·	Bendigo Women's International (1)	· 2015 →

Casey Dellacqua was the defending champion, however she chose not to participate.

Eri Hozumi won the title, defeating Risa Ozaki in an all-Japanese final, 7–6^{(7–5)}, 5–7, 6–2.

== Seeds ==
1. (Japan) Eri Hozumi (champion)
2. (Sweden) Rebecca Peterson (semifinals; retired)
3. (Japan) Risa Ozaki (final)
4. (France) Alizé Lim (second round)
5. (Russia) Daria Gavrilova (quarterfinals)
6. (China) Liu Fangzhou (second round)
7. (Croatia) Ema Mikulčić (first round)
8. (Thailand) Noppawan Lertcheewakarn (second round)

== Main draw ==
=== Key ===
- Q = Qualifier
- WC = Wild card
- LL = Lucky loser
- Alt = Alternate
- SE = Special exempt
- PR = Protected ranking
- ITF = ITF entry
- JE = Junior exempt
- w/o = Walkover
- r = Retired
- d = Defaulted
- SR = Special ranking

=== Finals ===
Semifinals
1	(Japan) Eri Hozumi	7	6
(Sweden) Susanne Celik	5	3
3	(Japan) Risa Ozaki	7	1
2	(Sweden) Rebecca Peterson	5	3^{r}

Final
1	(Japan) Eri Hozumi	7^{7}	5	6
3	(Japan) Risa Ozaki	6^{5}	7	2

=== Top half ===
First round
1	(Japan) E Hozumi	6	6
(Australia) M Adamczak	3	1
(Kazakhstan) K Kerimbayeva	6^{5}	2
(Chinese Taipei) W-h Hsu	7^{7}	6
WC	(Australia) I Holland	6^{3}	6	3
(Bulgaria) D Evtimova	7^{7}	3	6
(Japan) M Inoue	6	7^{7}
7	(Croatia) E Mikulčić	3	6^{3}
4	(France) A Lim	6	6
(Japan) M Ozeki	2	1
(Croatia) T Mrdeža	3	3
(China) Z Yang	6	6
(Sweden) S Celik	6	6
(China) Y Zhang	3	2
WC	(Australia) N Bains	2	2
6	(China) F Liu	6	6

Second round
1	(Japan) E Hozumi	3	6	6
(Chinese Taipei) W-h Hsu	6	2	3
(Bulgaria) D Evtimova	6^{3}	4
(Japan) M Inoue	7^{7}	6
4	(France) A Lim	4	3
(China) Z Yang	6	6
(Sweden) S Celik	6	6
6	(China) F Liu	4	4

Quarterfinals
1	(Japan) E Hozumi	7^{8}	6
(Japan) M Inoue	6^{6}	2
(China) Z Yang	0	5
(Sweden) S Celik	6	7

Semifinals
1	(Japan) E Hozumi	7	6
(Sweden) S Celik	5	3

=== Bottom half ===
First round
8	(Thailand) N Lertcheewakarn	6	6
PR	(Russia) K Lykina	3	2
(Thailand) V Wongteanchai	7^{7}	6
Q	(Germany) L Schäder	6^{2}	0
WC	(Australia) K Birrell	7^{7}	6
(Ukraine) V Kapshay	6^{3}	3
(China) Y Wang	5	4
3	(Japan) R Ozaki	7	6
5	(Russia) D Gavrilova	6	6
Q	(Japan) M Minokoshi	0	2
(South Africa) C Simmonds	4	0
WC	(Australia) A Myers	6	6
(Australia) J Moore	6	6
Q	(Japan) M Kijima	0	3
Q	(Sweden) E Allgurin	2	2
2	(Sweden) R Peterson	6	6

Second round
8	(Thailand) N Lertcheewakarn	6	5	6^{2}
(Thailand) V Wongteanchai	3	7	7^{7}
WC	(Australia) K Birrell	6	4	2
3	(Japan) R Ozaki	1	6	6
5	(Russia) D Gavrilova	6	6
WC	(Australia) A Myers	1	2
(Australia) J Moore	3	4
2	(Sweden) R Peterson	6	6

Quarterfinals
(Thailand) V Wongteanchai	4	2
3	(Japan) R Ozaki	6	6
5	(Russia) D Gavrilova	3	6	3
2	(Sweden) R Peterson	6	4	6

Semifinals
3	(Japan) R Ozaki	7	1
2	(Sweden) R Peterson	5	3^{r}
