= 2015 Bendigo Women's International – Doubles =

Doubles
- 2015 Bendigo Women's International

Final
- Champions: (United States) Lauren Embree (United States) Asia Muhammad
- Runners-up: (Russia) Natela Dzalamidze (Japan) Hiroko Kuwata
- Score: 7–5, 6–3

Events
| Singles | Doubles |
| ← 2014 · | Bendigo Women's International | · 2016 → |

Jessica Moore and Abbie Myers were the defending champions, but both players chose to participate with different partners. Moore partnered Storm Sanders but lost in the semifinals, whilst Myers partnered Pia König, but lost in the first round.

Lauren Embree and Asia Muhammad won the title, defeating Natela Dzalamidze and Hiroko Kuwata in the final, 7–5, 6–3.

== Seeds ==
1. (Russia) Natela Dzalamidze / (Japan) Hiroko Kuwata (final)
2. (Australia) Jessica Moore / (Australia) Storm Sanders (semifinals)
3. (United States) Lauren Embree / (United States) Asia Muhammad (champions)
4. (Belarus) Ilona Kremen / (Japan) Erika Sema (semifinals)

== Draw ==
=== Key ===
- Q = Qualifier
- WC = Wild card
- LL = Lucky loser
- Alt = Alternate
- SE = Special exempt
- PR = Protected ranking
- ITF = ITF entry
- JE = Junior exempt
- w/o = Walkover
- r = Retired
- d = Defaulted
- SR = Special ranking

First round
1 | (Russia) N Dzalamidze (Japan) H Kuwata | 6 | 7^{7}
Q | (United States) V Corning (United States) J Wacnik | 4 | 6^{4}
WC | (Australia) A Parnaby (Australia) A Svinos | 6^{3} | 2
(United Kingdom) K Dunne (China) Y Wang | 7^{7} | 6
4 | (Belarus) I Kremen (Japan) E Sema | 5 | 6 | [10]
(Netherlands) C Burger (Australia) K Wlodarczak | 7 | 4 | [8]
(Australia) A Bai (Australia) S Peers | 6 | 7
(Austria) P König (Australia) A Myers | 2 | 5
(France) M Arcangioli (Sweden) S Celik | 7^{7} | 4 | [10]
(Australia) P Hon (Australia) T Patterson | 6^{5} | 6 | [3]
WC | (Australia) L Cabrera (Australia) M Inglis | 0 | 1
3 | (United States) L Embree (United States) A Muhammad | 6 | 6
WC | (Australia) D Aiava (Australia) O Tjandramulia | 6 | 4 | [10]
(Australia) N Bains (United States) J Elie | 3 | 6 | [5]
Q | (Australia) MA Liu (Australia) E Long | 2 | 4
2 | (Australia) J Moore (Australia) S Sanders | 6 | 6

Quarterfinals
1 | (Russia) N Dzalamidze (Japan) H Kuwata | 6 | 6
(United Kingdom) K Dunne (China) Y Wang | 1 | 1
4 | (Belarus) I Kremen (Japan) E Sema | 6 | 6
(Australia) A Bai (Australia) S Peers | 4 | 2
(France) M Arcangioli (Sweden) S Celik | 6^{2} | 0
3 | (United States) L Embree (United States) A Muhammad | 7^{7} | 6
WC | (Australia) D Aiava (Australia) O Tjandramulia | 1 | 5
2 | (Australia) J Moore (Australia) S Sanders | 6 | 7

Semifinals
1 | (Russia) N Dzalamidze (Japan) H Kuwata | 6 | 7
4 | (Belarus) I Kremen (Japan) E Sema | 4 | 5
3 | (United States) L Embree (United States) A Muhammad | 6 | 6
2 | (Australia) J Moore (Australia) S Sanders | 3 | 4

Final
1 | (Russia) N Dzalamidze (Japan) H Kuwata | 5 | 3
3 | (United States) L Embree (United States) A Muhammad | 7 | 6
