= 2015 Bendigo Women's International – Singles =

Singles
- 2015 Bendigo Women's International

Final
- Champion: (Japan) Misa Eguchi
- Runner-up: (Japan) Hiroko Kuwata
- Score: 7–6^{(7–5)}, 6–3

Events
Singles	Doubles
← 2014 ·	Bendigo Women's International	· 2016 →

Liu Fangzhou was the defending champion, but chose to participate in Hua Hin instead.

Misa Eguchi won the title, defeating Hiroko Kuwata in an all-Japanese final, 7–6^{(7–5)}, 6–3.

== Seeds ==
1. (Japan) Eri Hozumi (quarterfinals)
2. (Netherlands) Cindy Burger (quarterfinals)
3. (Japan) Misa Eguchi (champion)
4. (China) Zhang Yuxuan (quarterfinals)
5. (Japan) Hiroko Kuwata (final)
6. (Sweden) Susanne Celik (second round)
7. (Japan) Erika Sema (second round)
8. (Russia) Natela Dzalamidze (second round)

== Main draw ==
=== Key ===
- Q = Qualifier
- WC = Wild card
- LL = Lucky loser
- Alt = Alternate
- SE = Special exempt
- PR = Protected ranking
- ITF = ITF entry
- JE = Junior exempt
- w/o = Walkover
- r = Retired
- d = Defaulted
- SR = Special ranking

=== Finals ===
Semifinals
Q	(Australia) Tammi Patterson	5	6	3
5	(Japan) Hiroko Kuwata	7	1	6
3	(Japan) Misa Eguchi	3	6	6
(United States) Asia Muhammad	6	2	3

Final
5	(Japan) Hiroko Kuwata	6^{5}	3
3	(Japan) Misa Eguchi	7^{7}	6

=== Top half ===
First round
1	(Japan) E Hozumi	6	6
(United States) L Embree	1	1
(Australia) J Moore	3	4
(Slovakia) Z Zlochová	6	6
Q	(Japan) M Kijima	6	2	4
Q	(Australia) T Patterson	2	6	6
WC	(Australia) M Inglis	7^{7}	3	4
7	(Japan) E Sema	6^{3}	6	6
4	(China) Y Zhang	3	6	6
(Australia) K Birrell	6	3	4
(United Kingdom) K Dunne	3	3
WC	(Australia) O Tjandramulia	6	6
(France) M Arcangioli	6	6
(Austria) P König	2	3
PR	(Belarus) I Kremen	6	3	4
5	(Japan) H Kuwata	4	6	6

Second round
1	(Japan) E Hozumi	6	6
(Slovakia) Z Zlochová	3	1
Q	(Australia) T Patterson	0	6	6
7	(Japan) E Sema	6	2	3
4	(China) Y Zhang	3	6	6
WC	(Australia) O Tjandramulia	6	2	3
(France) M Arcangioli	3	0
5	(Japan) H Kuwata	6	6

Quarterfinals
1	(Japan) E Hozumi	2	0
Q	(Australia) T Patterson	6	6
4	(China) Y Zhang	0	4
5	(Japan) H Kuwata	6	6

Semifinals
Q	(Australia) T Patterson	5	6	3
5	(Japan) H Kuwata	7	1	6

=== Bottom half ===
First round
8	(Russia) N Dzalamidze	6	6
(South Korea) S-r Lee	2	4
(Chinese Taipei) C-w Hsu	3	2
(Australia) Ar Rodionova	6	6
(Australia) S Sanders	6	3	5
(Australia) P Hon	4	6	7
WC	(Australia) D Aiava	0	3
3	(Japan) M Eguchi	6	6
6	(Sweden) S Celik	6	3	6
(China) Y Wang	3	6	3
(United States) A Muhammad	6	6
(Australia) A Bai	4	3
Q	(United States) J Elie	7	6
Q	(Australia) M Jovanovic	5	3
(Australia) S Peers	0	1
2	(Netherlands) C Burger	6	6

Second round
8	(Russia) N Dzalamidze	1	5
(Australia) Ar Rodionova	6	7
(Australia) P Hon	1	6	4
3	(Japan) M Eguchi	6	1	6
6	(Sweden) S Celik	3	3
(United States) A Muhammad	6	6
Q	(United States) J Elie	6	6^{1}	3
2	(Netherlands) C Burger	3	7^{7}	6

Quarterfinals
(Australia) Ar Rodionova	4	2
3	(Japan) M Eguchi	6	6
(United States) A Muhammad	6	7
2	(Netherlands) C Burger	2	5

Semifinals
3	(Japan) M Eguchi	3	6	6
(United States) A Muhammad	6	2	3
