= 2016 US Open – Women's singles qualifying =

Women's singles qualifying
- 2016 US Open

Events
Singles	men	women		boys	girls
Doubles	men	women	mixed	boys	girls
WC Singles	men	women	quad
WC Doubles	men	women	quad
Legends	men	women	mixed

Qualification
Singles	men	women
- US Open

== Seeds ==
1. (Slovakia) Kristína Kučová (qualified)
2. (China) Duan Yingying (qualified)
3. (Austria) Tamira Paszek (first round)
4. (Croatia) Donna Vekić (qualifying competition)
5. (China) Zhang Kailin (second round)
6. (Luxembourg) Mandy Minella (qualified)
7. (Belgium) Alison Van Uytvanck (qualifying competition, lucky loser)
8. (New Zealand) Marina Erakovic (first round)
9. (Russia) Elizaveta Kulichkova (first round)
10. (Japan) Risa Ozaki (qualifying competition)
11. (Romania) Ana Bogdan (qualified)
12. (Slovakia) Jana Čepelová (qualifying competition)
13. (Russia) Irina Khromacheva (first round)
14. (Japan) Misa Eguchi (first round)
15. (Germany) Tatjana Maria (qualifying competition)
16. (Czech Republic) Kristýna Plíšková (second round)
17. (Paraguay) Verónica Cepede Royg (first round)
18. (United States) Jennifer Brady (qualifying competition)
19. (China) Han Xinyun (qualifying competition)
20. (France) Océane Dodin (first round)
21. (United States) Julia Boserup (first round)
22. (Spain) Sílvia Soler Espinosa (first round)
23. (Switzerland) Amra Sadiković (first round)
24. (Sweden) Rebecca Peterson (qualifying competition)
25. (Spain) Sara Sorribes Tormo (qualifying competition)
26. (Bulgaria) Elitsa Kostova (qualifying competition)
27. (Belgium) Elise Mertens (qualified)
28. (United States) Jessica Pegula (qualified)
29. (Austria) Barbara Haas (qualified)
30. (Spain) Lourdes Domínguez Lino (first round)
31. (Bulgaria) Isabella Shinikova (second round)
32. (Serbia) Ivana Jorović (second round)

== Qualifiers ==
1. (Slovakia) Kristína Kučová
2. (China) Duan Yingying
3. (Paraguay) Montserrat González
4. (Argentina) Nadia Podoroska
5. (Belgium) Elise Mertens
6. (Luxembourg) Mandy Minella
7. (United States) Catherine Bellis
8. (China) Wang Yafan
9. (United States) Taylor Townsend
10. (United States) Jessica Pegula
11. (Romania) Ana Bogdan
12. (Austria) Barbara Haas
13. (Netherlands) Richèl Hogenkamp
14. (Germany) Antonia Lottner
15. (United Kingdom) Laura Robson
16. (Serbia) Aleksandra Krunić

== Lucky losers ==
1. (Belgium) Alison Van Uytvanck

== Draw ==
Key

- Q = Qualifier
- WC = Wild card
- LL = Lucky loser
- Alt = Alternate
- ITF = ITF entry
- PR = Protected ranking
- SR = Special ranking
- SE = Special exempt
- JE = Junior exempt
- JR = Junior Accelerator Programme entrant
- CO = College Accelerator Programme entrant
- NG = Next Gen Accelerator Program entrant
- w/o = Walkover
- r = Retired
- d = Defaulted

=== First qualifier ===
First round
1	(Slovakia) Kristína Kučová	6	5	6
(United States) Sachia Vickery	3	7	1
(Russia) Alexandra Panova	7^{7}	1	6
(Sweden) Susanne Celik	6^{5}	6	3
WC	(United States) Usue Maitane Arconada	3	6	6
(Chinese Taipei) Lee Ya-hsuan	6	3	3
(Uzbekistan) Sabina Sharipova	4	5
25	(Spain) Sara Sorribes Tormo	6	7

Second round
1	(Slovakia) Kristína Kučová	7^{10}	7
(Russia) Alexandra Panova	6^{8}	5
WC	(United States) Usue Maitane Arconada	7	4	2
25	(Spain) Sara Sorribes Tormo	5	6	6

Qualifying competition
1	(Slovakia) Kristína Kučová	6	6
25	(Spain) Sara Sorribes Tormo	2	3

=== Second qualifier ===
First round
2	(China) Duan Yingying	5	6	6
(Tunisia) Ons Jabeur	7	1	4
(Russia) Marina Melnikova	6^{5}	2
(Japan) Miyu Kato	7^{7}	6
(United States) Jamie Loeb	6	3	3
(Czech Republic) Tereza Smitková	2	6	6
PR	(Ukraine) Anhelina Kalinina	7	0	2
24	(Sweden) Rebecca Peterson	5	6	6

Second round
2	(China) Duan Yingying	7	6
(Japan) Miyu Kato	5	4
(Czech Republic) Tereza Smitková	0	1
24	(Sweden) Rebecca Peterson	6	6

Qualifying competition
2	(China) Duan Yingying	7	6
24	(Sweden) Rebecca Peterson	5	3

=== Third qualifier ===
First round
3	(Austria) Tamira Paszek	4	2
(Bulgaria) Viktoriya Tomova	6	6
(Russia) Ekaterina Alexandrova	7^{7}	2	6
(United States) Robin Anderson	6^{4}	6	3
(Netherlands) Michaëlla Krajicek	7^{8}	5	3
(Paraguay) Montserrat González	6^{6}	7	6
(Slovenia) Dalila Jakupović	3	4
32	(Serbia) Ivana Jorović	6	6

Second round
(Bulgaria) Viktoriya Tomova	4	6	7
(Russia) Ekaterina Alexandrova	6	3	5
(Paraguay) Montserrat González	7	6
32	(Serbia) Ivana Jorović	5	1

Qualifying competition
(Bulgaria) Viktoriya Tomova	1	6	5
(Paraguay) Montserrat González	6	2	7

=== Fourth qualifier ===
First round
4	(Croatia) Donna Vekić	6	6
(Russia) Ksenia Lykina	4	0
(France) Alizé Lim	0	6	6
(Russia) Natalia Vikhlyantseva	6	2	3
(Serbia) Jovana Jakšić	6	3	6
(China) Lu Jingjing	3	6	3
(Argentina) Nadia Podoroska	6	6
20	(France) Océane Dodin	3	3

Second round
4	(Croatia) Donna Vekić	3	7	6
(France) Alizé Lim	6	5	3
(Serbia) Jovana Jakšić	6	6^{8}	5
(Argentina) Nadia Podoroska	2	7^{10}	7

Qualifying competition
4	(Croatia) Donna Vekić	4	3
(Argentina) Nadia Podoroska	6	6

=== Fifth qualifier ===
First round
5	(China) Zhang Kailin	6	6
PR	(Ukraine) Yuliya Beygelzimer	2	3
WC	(United States) Francesca Di Lorenzo	6	3	4
(United States) Kristie Ahn	1	6	6
(Bulgaria) Sesil Karatancheva	6	3	6
(Slovakia) Rebecca Šramková	1	6	4
(Thailand) Luksika Kumkhum	2	4
27	(Belgium) Elise Mertens	6	6

Second round
5	(China) Zhang Kailin	6	4	3
(United States) Kristie Ahn	1	6	6
(Bulgaria) Sesil Karatancheva	6	0	1
27	(Belgium) Elise Mertens	3	6	6

Qualifying competition
(United States) Kristie Ahn	1	4
27	(Belgium) Elise Mertens	6	6

=== Sixth qualifier ===
First round
6	(Luxembourg) Mandy Minella	7	6
(Czech Republic) Barbora Štefková	5	3
(Japan) Mayo Hibi	5	3
(Belarus) Aryna Sabalenka	7	6
(Japan) Eri Hozumi	6	6
(Poland) Urszula Radwańska	4	0
WC	(United States) Amanda Anisimova	6	6
17	(Paraguay) Verónica Cepede Royg	3	4

Second round
6	(Luxembourg) Mandy Minella	7^{7}	6
(Belarus) Aryna Sabalenka	6^{2}	3
(Japan) Eri Hozumi	6	2	7^{7}
WC	(United States) Amanda Anisimova	1	6	6^{1}

Qualifying competition
6	(Luxembourg) Mandy Minella	6	6
(Japan) Eri Hozumi	3	1

=== Seventh qualifier ===
First round
7	(Belgium) Alison Van Uytvanck	6	2	6
(Russia) Alla Kudryavtseva	2	6	3
(Chinese Taipei) Chang Kai-chen	5	6	5
(Czech Republic) Lucie Hradecká	7	4	7
(United States) Catherine Bellis	6	6
(North Macedonia) Lina Gjorcheska	0	2
(United States) Grace Min	6	6
21	(United States) Julia Boserup	4	2

Second round
7	(Belgium) Alison Van Uytvanck	7	7
(Czech Republic) Lucie Hradecká	5	5
(United States) Catherine Bellis	6	6
(United States) Grace Min	4	0

Qualifying competition
7	(Belgium) Alison Van Uytvanck	2	7^{7}	2
(United States) Catherine Bellis	6	6^{5}	6

=== Eighth qualifier ===
First round
8	(New Zealand) Marina Erakovic	6^{5}	6	3
(China) Wang Yafan	7^{7}	4	6
(Ukraine) Valeriya Strakhova	6	6
PR	(Germany) Dinah Pfizenmaier	2	2
(Brazil) Paula Cristina Gonçalves	6^{2}	5
(Australia) Arina Rodionova	7^{7}	7
(Switzerland) Jil Teichmann	6^{6}	1
19	(China) Han Xinyun	7^{8}	6

Second round
(China) Wang Yafan	6	7^{9}
(Ukraine) Valeriya Strakhova	4	6^{7}
(Australia) Arina Rodionova	3	5
19	(China) Han Xinyun	6	7

Qualifying competition
(China) Wang Yafan	6	6^{2}	6
19	(China) Han Xinyun	2	7^{7}	4

=== Ninth qualifier ===
First round
9	(Russia) Elizaveta Kulichkova	4	4
(United States) Taylor Townsend	6	6
(Russia) Polina Leykina	2	4
(Ukraine) Olga Savchuk	6	6
(Israel) Julia Glushko	6	7
PR	(Japan) Miharu Imanishi	4	5
(Russia) Anastasia Pivovarova	6	3	6^{5}
18	(United States) Jennifer Brady	1	6	7^{7}

Second round
(United States) Taylor Townsend	6	6
(Ukraine) Olga Savchuk	0	2
(Israel) Julia Glushko	4	0
18	(United States) Jennifer Brady	6	6

Qualifying competition
(United States) Taylor Townsend	7	6
18	(United States) Jennifer Brady	5	4

=== Tenth qualifier ===
First round
10	(Japan) Risa Ozaki	7^{7}	6
(Argentina) Catalina Pella	6^{5}	1
(South Korea) Han Na-lae	6	6
(China) Zhu Lin	2	1
(Belgium) An-Sophie Mestach	4	6	6
WC	(United States) Ellie Halbauer	6	2	2
(Uzbekistan) Nigina Abduraimova	1	6^{6}
28	(United States) Jessica Pegula	6	7^{8}

Second round
10	(Japan) Risa Ozaki	6	6
(South Korea) Han Na-lae	1	2
(Belgium) An-Sophie Mestach	4	3
28	(United States) Jessica Pegula	6	6

Qualifying competition
10	(Japan) Risa Ozaki	6	0	3
28	(United States) Jessica Pegula	4	6	6

=== Eleventh qualifier ===
First round
11	(Romania) Ana Bogdan	6	7
(Japan) Hiroko Kuwata	3	5
(Serbia) Nina Stojanović	6	3	1
(Belgium) Ysaline Bonaventure	4	6	6
(France) Amandine Hesse	6^{5}	6	7
(Czech Republic) Karolína Muchová	7^{7}	3	5
(Canada) Françoise Abanda	2	6	6
22	(Spain) Sílvia Soler Espinosa	6	4	3

Second round
11	(Romania) Ana Bogdan	2	6	6
(Belgium) Ysaline Bonaventure	6	0	4
(France) Amandine Hesse	6	6^{5}	2
(Canada) Françoise Abanda	4	7^{7}	6

Qualifying competition
11	(Romania) Ana Bogdan	6	3	6
(Canada) Françoise Abanda	2	6	2

=== Twelfth qualifier ===
First round
12	(Slovakia) Jana Čepelová	6	6
(Ukraine) Maryna Zanevska	1	3
(France) Shérazad Reix	1	2
(Poland) Paula Kania	6	6
(China) Zhang Yuxuan	6	7^{7}
WC	(United States) Sophie Chang	3	6^{2}
(Romania) Andreea Mitu	6^{3}	4
29	(Austria) Barbara Haas	7^{7}	6

Second round
12	(Slovakia) Jana Čepelová	4	6	6
(Poland) Paula Kania	6	3	3
(China) Zhang Yuxuan	7	4	6^{1}
29	(Austria) Barbara Haas	5	6	7^{7}

Qualifying competition
12	(Slovakia) Jana Čepelová	2	4
29	(Austria) Barbara Haas	6	6

=== Thirteenth qualifier ===
First round
13	(Russia) Irina Khromacheva	6	5	3
(China) Liu Fangzhou	2	7	6
(Netherlands) Richèl Hogenkamp	6	6
(Chile) Daniela Seguel	2	0
(Georgia (country)) Sofia Shapatava	4	4
(United States) Asia Muhammad	6	6
(Netherlands) Cindy Burger	4	6	7
30	(Spain) Lourdes Domínguez Lino	6	4	5

Second round
(China) Liu Fangzhou	6	2	0
(Netherlands) Richèl Hogenkamp	3	6	6
(United States) Asia Muhammad	6	6
(Netherlands) Cindy Burger	2	2

Qualifying competition
(Netherlands) Richèl Hogenkamp	7	2	6
(United States) Asia Muhammad	5	6	2

=== Fourteenth qualifier ===
First round
14	(Japan) Misa Eguchi	4	4
(France) Myrtille Georges	6	6
WC	(United States) Caroline Dolehide	4	3
WC	(United States) Melanie Oudin	6	6
PR	(Croatia) Tereza Mrdeža	4	1
(United Kingdom) Tara Moore	6	6
(Germany) Antonia Lottner	6	6
23	(Switzerland) Amra Sadiković	2	1

Second round
(France) Myrtille Georges	7	4	6
WC	(United States) Melanie Oudin	5	6	4
(United Kingdom) Tara Moore	6	3	2
(Germany) Antonia Lottner	1	6	6

Qualifying competition
(France) Myrtille Georges	2	3
(Germany) Antonia Lottner	6	6

=== Fifteenth qualifier ===
First round
15	(Germany) Tatjana Maria	6	3	6
(Czech Republic) Jesika Malečková	4	6	2
WC	(United States) Nicole Frenkel	4	1
(Turkey) İpek Soylu	6	6
(South Korea) Jang Su-jeong	3	2
WC	(United Kingdom) Laura Robson	6	6
(Netherlands) Lesley Kerkhove	3	1
31	(Bulgaria) Isabella Shinikova	6	6

Second round
15	(Germany) Tatjana Maria	0	7	6
(Turkey) İpek Soylu	6	5	3
WC	(United Kingdom) Laura Robson	6	6
31	(Bulgaria) Isabella Shinikova	4	4

Qualifying competition
15	(Germany) Tatjana Maria	6^{5}	1
WC	(United Kingdom) Laura Robson	7^{7}	6

=== Sixteenth qualifier ===
First round
16	(Czech Republic) Kristýna Plíšková	6	6
(Germany) Tamara Korpatsch	2	4
(Belarus) Olga Govortsova	4	3
(Serbia) Aleksandra Krunić	6	6
(Japan) Shuko Aoyama	6	6
PR	(Brazil) Beatriz Haddad Maia	3	2
(China) Xu Shilin	0	5
26	(Bulgaria) Elitsa Kostova	6	7

Second round
16	(Czech Republic) Kristýna Plíšková	6	2	0
(Serbia) Aleksandra Krunić	4	6	6
(Japan) Shuko Aoyama	6	4	0
26	(Bulgaria) Elitsa Kostova	4	6	6

Qualifying competition
(Serbia) Aleksandra Krunić	6	7^{7}
26	(Bulgaria) Elitsa Kostova	1	6^{2}
