= 2016 Bendigo Women's International =

- Date: 24–30 October
- Edition: 10th
- Category: ITF Women's Circuit
- Prize money: $50,000
- Surface: Hard
- Location: Bendigo, Australia

Champions

Singles
- (Japan) Risa Ozaki

Doubles
- (United States) Asia Muhammad / (Australia) Arina Rodionova
← 2015 ·	Bendigo Women's International	· 2017 →

The 2016 Bendigo Women's International was a professional tennis tournament played on outdoor hard courts. It was the 10th edition of the tournament and part of the 2016 ITF Women's Circuit, offering a total of $50,000 in prize money. It took place in Bendigo, Australia, on 24–30 October 2016.

== Singles main draw entrants ==
=== Seeds ===
Country	Player	Rank^{1}	Seed
JPN	Risa Ozaki	120	1
USA	Asia Muhammad	166	2
ISR	Julia Glushko	172	3
AUS	Arina Rodionova	185	4
JPN	Eri Hozumi	188	5
CRO	Jana Fett	195	6
JPN	Shuko Aoyama	202	7
USA	Jennifer Elie	265	8

- ^{1} Rankings as of 17 October 2016.

=== Other entrants ===
The following player received a wildcard into the singles main draw:

- (Australia) Monique Adamczak
- (Australia) Maddison Inglis
- (Australia) Angelique Svinos

The following players received entry from the qualifying draw:

- (Italy) Georgia Brescia
- (United States) Yuki Kristina Chiang
- (Papua New Guinea) Abigail Tere-Apisah
- (Ukraine) Marianna Zakarlyuk

The following player received entry by a lucky loser spot:

- (United States) Shelby Talcott

== Champions ==
=== Singles ===
- (Japan) Risa Ozaki def. (United States) Asia Muhammad, 6–3, 6–3

=== Doubles ===
- (United States) Asia Muhammad / (Australia) Arina Rodionova def. (Japan) Shuko Aoyama / (Japan) Risa Ozaki, 6–4, 6–3
