= 2016 Bendigo Women's International – Singles =

Singles
- 2016 Bendigo Women's International

Final
- Champion: (Japan) Risa Ozaki
- Runner-up: (United States) Asia Muhammad
- Score: 6–3, 6–3

Events
Singles	Doubles
← 2015 ·	Bendigo Women's International	· 2017 →

Misa Eguchi was the defending champion, but chose not to participate.

Risa Ozaki won the title, defeating Asia Muhammad in the final, 6–3, 6–3.

== Seeds ==
1. (Japan) Risa Ozaki (champion)
2. (United States) Asia Muhammad (final)
3. (Israel) Julia Glushko (second round)
4. (Australia) Arina Rodionova (second round)
5. (Japan) Eri Hozumi (second round)
6. (Croatia) Jana Fett (first round)
7. (Japan) Shuko Aoyama (first round)
8. (United States) Jennifer Elie (first round)

== Main draw ==
=== Key ===
- Q = Qualifier
- WC = Wild card
- LL = Lucky loser
- Alt = Alternate
- SE = Special exempt
- PR = Protected ranking
- ITF = ITF entry
- JE = Junior exempt
- w/o = Walkover
- r = Retired
- d = Defaulted
- SR = Special ranking

=== Finals ===
Semifinals
1	(Japan) Risa Ozaki	6	6
Q	(Papua New Guinea) Abigail Tere-Apisah	2	3
(Thailand) Varatchaya Wongteanchai	4	5
2	(United States) Asia Muhammad	6	7

Final
1	(Japan) Risa Ozaki	6	6
2	(United States) Asia Muhammad	3	3

=== Top half ===
First round
1	(Japan) R Ozaki	6	6
LL	(United States) S Talcott	2	1
(Australia) S Sanders	3	4
(Australia) J Fourlis	6	6
(Australia) A Bai	6	3	6^{2}
(Australia) L Cabrera	3	6	7^{7}
(Australia) O Rogowska	4	3
5	(Japan) E Hozumi	6	6
3	(Israel) J Glushko	6	6
Q	(Ukraine) M Zakarlyuk	4	4
Q	(United States) YK Chiang	2	5
Q	(Papua New Guinea) A Tere-Apisah	6	7
WC	(Australia) A Svinos	0	1
(Australia) N Bains	6	6
WC	(Australia) M Inglis	7	6
7	(Japan) S Aoyama	5	2

Second round
1	(Japan) R Ozaki	6	6
(Australia) J Fourlis	2	4
(Australia) L Cabrera	6	7
5	(Japan) E Hozumi	3	5
3	(Israel) J Glushko	6	3	2
Q	(Papua New Guinea) A Tere-Apisah	1	6	6
(Australia) N Bains	6	6
WC	(Australia) M Inglis	4	4

Quarterfinals
1	(Japan) R Ozaki	6	4	6
(Australia) L Cabrera	2	6	3
Q	(Papua New Guinea) A Tere-Apisah	6	6
(Australia) N Bains	4	3

Semifinals
1	(Japan) R Ozaki	6	6
Q	(Papua New Guinea) A Tere-Apisah	2	3

=== Bottom half ===
First round
6	(Croatia) J Fett	6	2	1
(United Kingdom) K Dunne	3	6	6
(Australia) J Moore	4	1
(Australia) D Aiava	6	6
(Thailand) V Wongteanchai	6	6
WC	(Australia) M Adamczak	2	2
(Australia) O Tjandramulia	6	5	5
4	(Australia) Ar Rodionova	1	7	7
8	(United States) J Elie	4	3
(Poland) K Kawa	6	6
(Thailand) N Lertcheewakarn	4	5
(Australia) T Patterson	6	7
(Slovakia) Z Zlochová	6	6
(Norway) U Eikeri	3	2
Q	(Italy) G Brescia	4	1
2	(United States) A Muhammad	6	6

Second round
(United Kingdom) K Dunne	3	6	6
(Australia) D Aiava	6	3	0
(Thailand) V Wongteanchai	7	7
4	(Australia) Ar Rodionova	5	5
(Poland) K Kawa	5	6	5
(Australia) T Patterson	7	2	7
(Slovakia) Z Zlochová	1	4
2	(United States) A Muhammad	6	6

Quarterfinals
(United Kingdom) K Dunne	3	3
(Thailand) V Wongteanchai	6	6
(Australia) T Patterson	3	5
2	(United States) A Muhammad	6	7

Semifinals
(Thailand) V Wongteanchai	4	5
2	(United States) A Muhammad	6	7
