= 2016 Bendigo Women's International – Doubles =

Doubles
- 2016 Bendigo Women's International

Final
- Champions: (United States) Asia Muhammad (Australia) Arina Rodionova
- Runners-up: (Japan) Shuko Aoyama (Japan) Risa Ozaki
- Score: 6–4, 6–3

Events
Singles	Doubles
← 2015 ·	Bendigo Women's International	· 2017 →

Lauren Embree and Asia Muhammad were the defending champions, but Embree chose not to participate.

Muhammad partnered Arina Rodionova, and successfully defended her title. The pair defeated Shuko Aoyama and Risa Ozaki in the final, 6–4, 6–3.

== Seeds ==
1. (United States) Asia Muhammad / (Australia) Arina Rodionova (champions)
2. (Australia) Jessica Moore / (Australia) Storm Sanders (semifinals)
3. (Japan) Shuko Aoyama / (Japan) Risa Ozaki (final)
4. (Brazil) Gabriela Cé / (Poland) Katarzyna Kawa (quarterfinals)

== Draw ==
=== Key ===
- Q = Qualifier
- WC = Wild card
- LL = Lucky loser
- Alt = Alternate
- SE = Special exempt
- PR = Protected ranking
- ITF = ITF entry
- JE = Junior exempt
- w/o = Walkover
- r = Retired
- d = Defaulted
- SR = Special ranking

First round
1	(United States) A Muhammad (Australia) Ar Rodionova	6	6
(Australia) M Inglis (Australia) S Peers	3	3
(Italy) G Brescia (Norway) U Eikeri	6	7^{7}
(United States) YK Chiang (Australia) O Tjandramulia	4	6^{4}
4	(Brazil) G Cé (Poland) K Kawa	7	2	[10]
(Australia) N Bains (Papua New Guinea) A Tere-Apisah	5	6	[6]
Q	(Australia) G Da Silva-Fick (Australia) J Fourlis	2	3
(Australia) M Adamczak (Australia) O Rogowska	6	6
(United Kingdom) K Dunne (Australia) T Patterson	6	6^{4}	[11]
(Australia) A Bai (Australia) L Cabrera	4	7^{7}	[9]
(Thailand) N Lertcheewakarn (Thailand) V Wongteanchai	7^{11}	5	[12]
3	(Japan) S Aoyama (Japan) R Ozaki	6^{9}	7	[14]
(Australia) K McPhee (Australia) A Parnaby	5	1
(Australia) D Aiava (Australia) A Smith	7	6
Q	(Australia) A Svinos (United States) S Talcott	0	2
2	(Australia) J Moore (Australia) S Sanders	6	6

Quarterfinals
1	(United States) A Muhammad (Australia) Ar Rodionova	6	6
(Italy) G Brescia (Norway) U Eikeri	1	1
4	(Brazil) G Cé (Poland) K Kawa	4	1
(Australia) M Adamczak (Australia) O Rogowska	6	6
(United Kingdom) K Dunne (Australia) T Patterson	4	4
3	(Japan) S Aoyama (Japan) R Ozaki	6	6
(Australia) D Aiava (Australia) A Smith	5	6	[6]
2	(Australia) J Moore (Australia) S Sanders	7	2	[10]

Semifinals
1	(United States) A Muhammad (Australia) Ar Rodionova	7	6
(Australia) M Adamczak (Australia) O Rogowska	5	4
3	(Japan) S Aoyama (Japan) R Ozaki	7	6^{7}	[10]
2	(Australia) J Moore (Australia) S Sanders	5	7^{9}	[7]

Final
1	(United States) A Muhammad (Australia) Ar Rodionova	6	6
3	(Japan) S Aoyama (Japan) R Ozaki	4	3
