= Karolina Wlodarczak =

Australian tennis player

- Country (sports): Australia
- Residence: Melbourne
- Born: 27 June 1987 (age 38) Melbourne
- Height: 1.78 m (5 ft 10 in)
- Turned pro: 2005
- Plays: Right-handed (two-handed backhand)
- Prize money: $65,331

Singles
- Career record: 165–154
- Highest ranking: No. 380 (21 March 2011)

Grand Slam singles results
- Australian Open: Q1 (2008)

Doubles
- Career record: 80–103
- Career titles: 5 ITF
- Highest ranking: No. 248 (5 January 2015)

Grand Slam doubles results
- Australian Open: 1R (2008)

Karolina Wlodarczak (Polish: Karolina Włodarczak; born 27 June 1987) is an Australian former professional tennis player. Her highest WTA rankings are 380 in singles and 248 in doubles.

At the 2008 Australian Open, Wlodarczak was given a wildcard into the singles qualifying, where she lost in the first round to Julia Schruff. She was also handed a wildcard into the doubles event with Marija Mirkovic, but they lost in the first round.

== ITF Circuit finals ==
$50,000 tournaments
$25,000 tournaments
$10,000 tournaments

=== Singles: 3 (0–3) ===
| Result | No. | Date | Tournament | Surface | Opponent | Score |
|---|---|---|---|---|---|---|
| Loss | 1. | 25 May 2009 | ITF Olecko, Poland | Clay | (Poland) Klaudia Gawlik | 2–6, 3–0 ret. |
| Loss | 2. | 25 July 2011 | ITF Maaseik, Belgium | Clay | (Netherlands) Nicolette van Uitert | 4–6, 1–0 ret. |
| Loss | 3. | 2 July 2012 | ITF Brussels, Belgium | Clay | (Russia) Natalia Ryzhonkova | 2–6, ret. |

=== Doubles: 14 (5–9) ===
| Outcome | No. | Date | Tournament | Surface | Partner | Opponents | Score |
|---|---|---|---|---|---|---|---|
| Runner-up | 1. | 4 September 2006 | ITF Hope Island, Australia | Hard | (New Zealand) Shona Lee | (Australia) Shannon Golds (Australia) Lucia Gonzalez | 4–6, 6–7 |
| Runner-up | 2. | 25 May 2009 | ITF Olecko, Poland | Clay | (Poland) Veronika Domagala | (Poland) Karolina Kosińska (Poland) Aleksandra Rosolska | 6–2, 2–6, [9–11] |
| Winner | 3. | 7 May 2011 | Wiesbaden Open, Germany | Clay | (Romania) Mihaela Buzărnescu | (Germany) Dejana Raickovic (Netherlands) Ghislaine van Baal | 6–7^{(4)}, 6–3, [10–6] |
| Winner | 4. | 20 June 2011 | ITF Breda, Netherlands | Clay | (Netherlands) Eva Wacanno | (Netherlands) Kim Kilsdonk (Netherlands) Nicolette van Uitert | 6–2, 6–4 |
| Winner | 5. | 15 Aug 2011 | ITF Ratingen, Germany | Clay | (Ukraine) Elizaveta Ianchuk | (Germany) Katharina Hering (Germany) Dinah Pfizenmaier | 3–6, 6–1, 6–4 |
| Runner-up | 6. | 22 Aug 2011 | ITF Charleroi, Belgium | Clay | (Poland) Magdalena Kiszczyńska | (China) Lu Jiajing (China) Lu Jiaxiang | 3–6, 0–6 |
| Winner | 7. | 30 April 2012 | ITF Edinburgh, UK | Clay | (Netherlands) Eva Wacanno | (France) Elixane Lechemia (Czech Republic) Martina Přádová | 4–6, 6–0, [13–11] |
| Runner-up | 8. | 2 July 2012 | ITF Brussels, Belgium | Clay | (Belgium) Elyne Boeykens | (Chile) Daniela Seguel (Russia) Anna Smolina | 6–2, 2–6, [7–10] |
| Runner-up | 9. | 22 April 2013 | ITF Bournemouth, UK | Clay | (Belgium) Elyne Boeykens | (United Kingdom) Anna Fitzpatrick (United Kingdom) Jade Windley | 4–6, 1–6 |
| Runner-up | 10. | 12 Aug 2013 | ITF Ratingen, Germany | Clay | (Netherlands) Bernice van de Velde | (Germany) Carolin Daniels (Germany) Anna Klasen | 5–7, 2–6 |
| Winner | 11. | 2 September 2013 | ITF Huy, Belgium | Clay | (Germany) Franziska Koenig | (Germany) Julia Wachaczyk (Germany) Nina Zander | 6–2, 6–4 |
| Runner-up | 12. | 30 June 2014 | Open Denain, France | Clay | (United Kingdom) Nicola Slater | (Brazil) Paula Cristina Gonçalves (Argentina) Florencia Molinero | 6–7^{(3)}, 6–7^{(4)} |
| Runner-up | 13. | 10 November 2014 | Bendigo International, Australia | Hard | (Australia) Naiktha Bains | (Australia) Jessica Moore (Australia) Abbie Myers | 4–6, 0–6 |
| Runner-up | 14. | 12 September 2015 | ITF Prague, Czech Republic | Clay | (United States) Tina Tehrani | (Ukraine) Maryna Kolb (Ukraine) Nadiya Kolb | 4–6, 2–6 |
