= Isabella Holland =

Australian tennis player

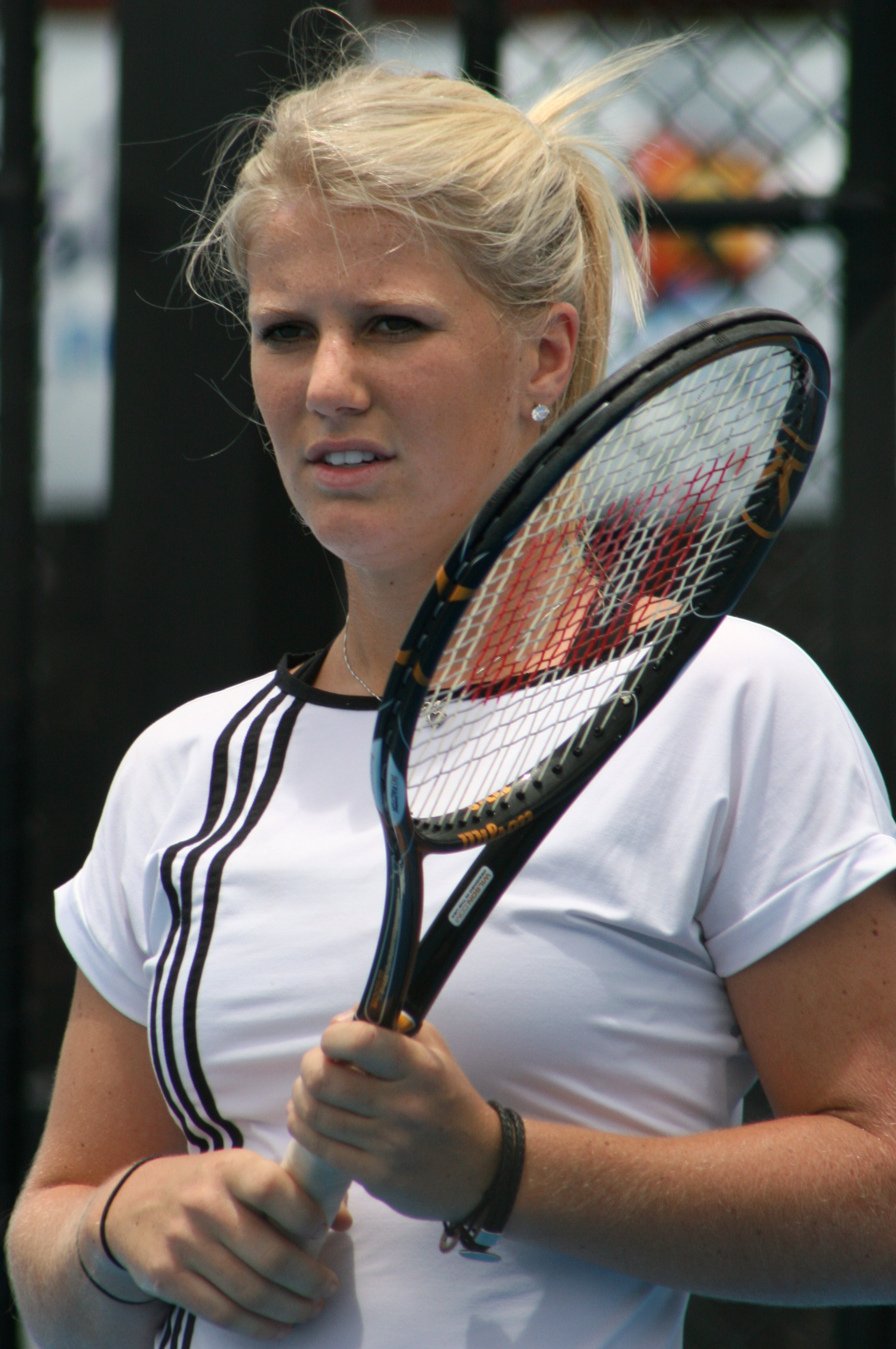
- Isabella Holland at Brisbane, 2009
- Country (sports): Australia
- Residence: Brisbane, Australia
- Born: 2 January 1992 (age 33); Brisbane, Australia
- Height: 1.72 m (5 ft 7 1/2 in)
- Turned pro: August 2006
- Plays: Right-handed (two-handed backhand)
- Prize money: $143,689

Singles
- Career record: 136–140
- Career titles: 2 ITF
- Highest ranking: No. 179 (5 December 2011)

Grand Slam singles results
- Australian Open: 1R (2009, 2012)

Doubles
- Career record: 57–77
- Career titles: 3 ITF
- Highest ranking: No. 277 (27 February 2012)

Grand Slam doubles results
- Australian Open: 2R (2009, 2011, 2012)

Isabella Holland (born 2 January 1992) is an Australian former professional tennis player.

== Career ==
Holland's preferred surfaces are clay and hardcourt.

Her highest WTA singles ranking of world No. 179 she reached on 5 December 2011. Her highest WTA doubles ranking is 277, which she achieved on 27 February 2012.

In 2008, Holland reached the final of the girls' doubles at Wimbledon partnering Sally Peers, losing to Polona Hercog and Jessica Moore 3–6, 6–1, 2–6.

== ITF Circuit finals ==
=== Singles: 6 (2 titles, 4 runner–ups) ===
Legend
$25,000 tournaments
$15,000 tournaments

Result	W–L	Date	Tournament	Tier	Surface	Opponent	Score
Loss	0–1	Sep 2008	ITF Kawana Waters, Australia	25,000	Hard	(Australia) Jarmila Gajdošová	5–7, 4–6
Loss	0–2	Nov 2010	ITF Kalgoorlie, Australia	25,000	Hard	(Israel) Julia Glushko	1–6, 2–6
Win	1–2	Apr 2011	ITF Karshi, Uzbekistan	25,000	Hard	(Ukraine) Tetyana Arefyeva	7–5, 6–4
Loss	1–3	Sep 2011	ITF Alice Springs, Australia	25,000	Hard	(Australia) Olivia Rogowska	5–7, 5–7
Loss	1–4	Dec 2011	Bendigo International, Australia	25,000	Hard	(Australia) Casey Dellacqua	2–6, 2–6
Win	2–4	Sep 2013	ITF Toowoomba, Australia	15,000	Hard	(Slovakia) Zuzana Zlochová	2–6, 7–6^{(10–8)}, 6–3

=== Doubles (3–5) ===
Legend
$25,000 tournaments
$15,000 tournaments

Result	No.	Date	Tournament	Surface	Partner	Opponents	Score
Loss	1.	27 April 2009	Bundaberg, Australia	Clay	(Australia) Sally Peers	(Japan) Maki Arai (Switzerland) Nicole Riner	6–1, 4–6, [9–11]
Win	1.	21 September 2009	Darwin, Australia	Hard	(Australia) Sally Peers	(Australia) Alenka Hubacek (Indonesia) Jessy Rompies	6–4, 3–6, [10–4]
Loss	2.	16 November 2009	Esperance, Australia	Hard	(Australia) Sally Peers	(Australia) Shannon Golds (Australia) Olivia Rogowska	1–6, 1–6
Loss	3.	26 April 2010	Ipswich, Australia	Clay	(Australia) Sally Peers	(Japan) Moe Kawatoko (Japan) Miki Miyamura	4–6, 6–4, 5–7
Loss	4.	25 April 2011	Karshi, Uzbekistan	Hard	(United Kingdom) Naomi Broady	(Ukraine) Tetyana Arefyeva (Russia) Eugeniya Pashkova	7–6^{(7–1)}, 5–7, [7–10]
Win	2.	24 October 2011	Port Pirie, Australia	Hard	(Australia) Sally Peers	(Australia) Monique Adamczak (Australia) Bojana Bobusic	w/o
Loss	5.	31 October 2011	Mount Gambier, Australia	Hard	(Australia) Sally Peers	(Australia) Stephanie Bengson (Australia) Tyra Calderwood	w/o
Win	3.	16 September 2013	Cairns, Australia	Hard	(Australia) Sally Peers	(Japan) Miyu Kato (Japan) Yurina Koshino	7–6^{(9–7)}, 4–6, [10–7]
