= Risa Ozaki =

Japanese tennis player (born 1994)

Risa Ozaki 尾﨑 里紗
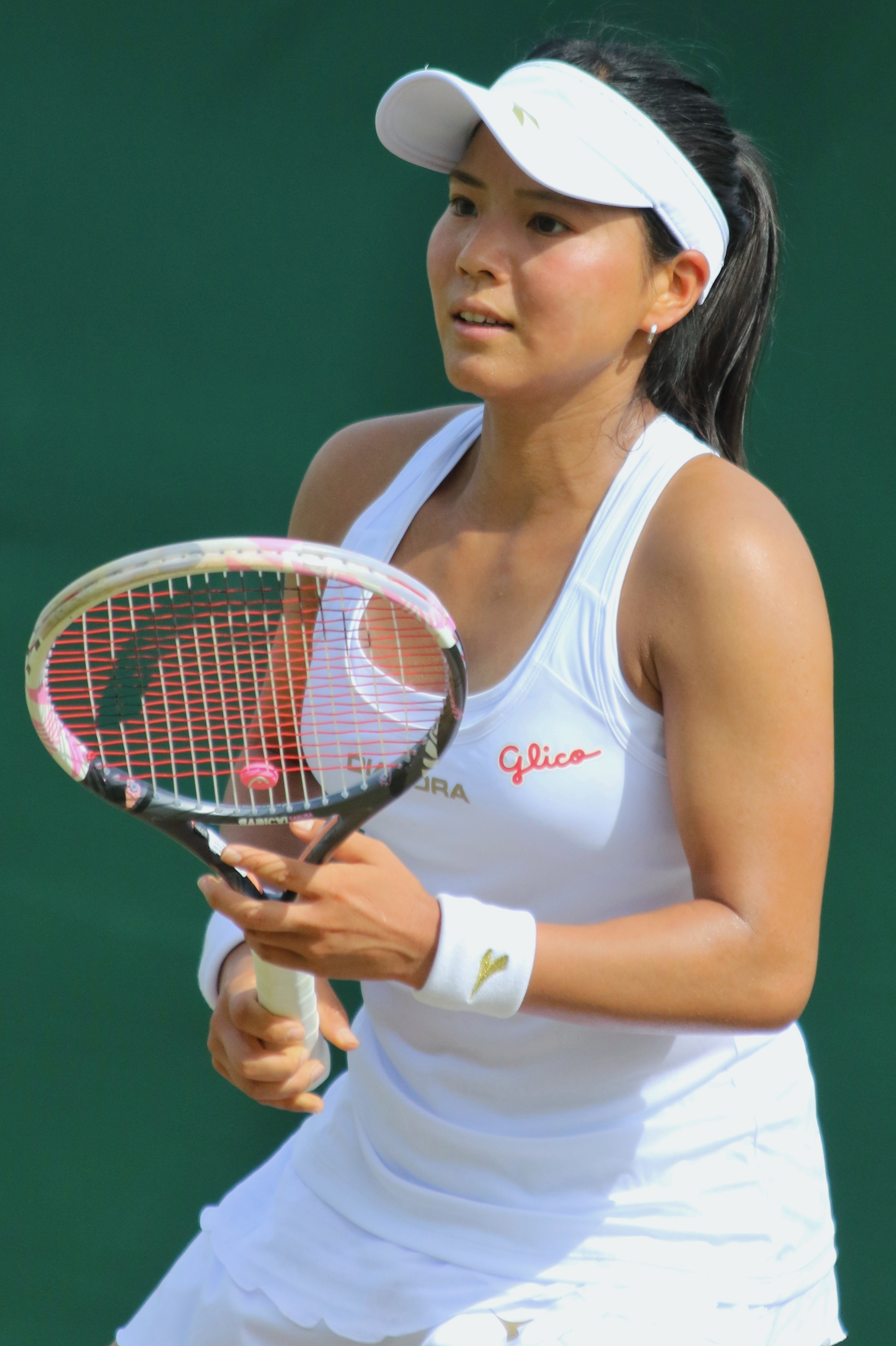
- Ozaki at the 2017 Wimbledon Championships
- Country (sports): Japan
- Residence: Kobe, Japan
- Born: 10 April 1994 (age 32) Kobe
- Height: 1.63 m (5 ft 4 in)
- Retired: October 2022
- Plays: Right (two-handed backhand)
- Prize money: $728,333

Singles
- Career record: 245–219
- Career titles: 7 ITF
- Highest ranking: No. 70 (24 April 2017)

Grand Slam singles results
- Australian Open: 1R (2017)
- French Open: 1R (2017)
- Wimbledon: 1R (2017)
- US Open: 2R (2017)

Doubles
- Career record: 19–26
- Highest ranking: No. 246 (6 March 2017)

Grand Slam doubles results
- French Open: 1R (2017)
Medal record
Representing Japan
Women's tennis
Asian Games
Bronze medal – third place	2014 Incheon	Team event

Risa Ozaki (尾﨑 里紗, Ozaki Risa) (born 10 April 1994) is a Japanese former professional tennis player.

In her career, Ozaki won seven singles titles on the ITF Women's Circuit. On 24 April 2017, she reached her best singles ranking of world No. 70. On 6 March 2017, she peaked at No. 246 in the WTA doubles rankings.

Ozaki made her WTA Tour debut at the 2013 Tashkent Open, having entered the qualifying tournament and defeating Veronika Kapshay and Ksenia Palkina for a spot in the main draw. She was thereby pitted against fellow qualifier Kateryna Kozlova and defeated the Ukrainian in straight sets, simultaneously recording her first main-draw win at the WTA Tour-level. She was subsequently beaten in the second round by Nastassja Burnett in a final-set tiebreak.

Competing for the Japan Fed Cup team, Ozaki has a win-loss record of 2–0 (only doubles).

== Performance timelines ==
Key
W	F	SF	QF	#R	RR	Q#	DNQ	A	NH

(W) winner; (F) finalist; (SF) semifinalist; (QF) quarterfinalist; (#R) rounds 4, 3, 2, 1; (RR) round-robin stage; (Q#) qualification round; (DNQ) did not qualify; (A) absent; (NH) not held; (SR) strike rate (events won / competed); (W–L) win–loss record.
To avoid confusion and double counting, these charts are updated at the conclusion of a tournament or when the player's participation has ended.

Only main-draw results in WTA Tour, Grand Slam tournaments, Fed Cup and Olympic Games are included in win–loss records.

=== Singles ===
Tournament	2011	2012	2013	2014	2015	2016	2017	2018	2019	SR	W–L
Grand Slam tournaments
Australian Open	A	A	A	Q3	Q1	Q2	1R	Q1	A	0 / 1	0–1
French Open	A	A	A	Q1	Q1	Q1	1R	A	A	0 / 1	0–1
Wimbledon	A	A	A	Q2	Q1	Q2	1R	A	A	0 / 1	0–1
US Open	A	A	Q1	Q1	Q1	Q3	2R	A	A	0 / 1	1–1
Win–Loss	0–0	0–0	0–0	0–0	0–0	0–0	1–4	0–0	0–0	0 / 4	1–4
WTA 1000
Dubai / Qatar Open (Note: The first Premier 5 event of the year has switched back and forth between the Dubai Tennis Championships and the Qatar Ladies Open since 2009. Dubai was classified as a Premier 5 event from 2009 to 2011 before being succeeded by Doha for the 2012–2014 period. In 2015, Dubai regained its Premier 5 status while Doha was demoted to Premier status. The Premier 5 tournaments were reclassified as WTA 1000 tournaments in 2021.)	A	A	A	A	A	A	Q2	Q1	A	0 / 0	0–0
Indian Wells Open	A	A	A	A	A	1R	1R	Q1	A	0 / 2	0–2
Miami Open	A	A	A	A	A	A	4R	A	A	0 / 1	3–1
Madrid Open	A	A	A	A	A	A	Q2	A	A	0 / 0	0–0
Italian Open	A	A	A	A	A	A	Q2	A	A	0 / 0	0–0
Canadian Open	A	A	A	A	A	A	Q2	A	A	0 / 0	0–0
Cincinnati Open	A	A	A	A	A	A	Q1	A	A	0 / 0	0–0
Pan Pacific / Wuhan Open (Note: In 2014, the Pan Pacific Open was downgraded to a Premier event and replaced by the Wuhan Open. The Premier 5 tournaments were reclassified as WTA 1000 tournaments in 2021.)	Q1	A	1R	A	A	A	A	A	A	0 / 1	0–1
Career statistics
Tournaments	0	0	3	2	4	8	19	2	1	Career total: 39	
Overall win–loss	0–0	0–0	1–3	0–2	2–4	8–8	8–19	0–2	0–1	0 / 39	19–39
Year-end ranking	972	333	188	220	145	94	114	281	313		

== WTA Tour finals ==
=== Doubles: 1 (runner-up) ===
Result	Date	Tournament	Tier	Surface	Partner	Opponents	Score
Loss	Jul 2016	Washington Open, United States	International	Hard	(Japan) Shuko Aoyama	(Romania) Monica Niculescu (Belgium) Yanina Wickmayer	4–6, 3–6

== ITF Circuit finals ==
=== Singles: 16 (7 titles, 9 runner-ups) ===
Legend $50,000 tournaments $25,000 tournaments	Finals by surface Hard (6–8) Clay (1–1)

Result	W–L	Date	Tournament	Tier	Surface	Opponent	Score
Loss	0–1	Sep 2012	ITF Tsukuba, Japan	25,000	Hard	(Japan) Aki Yamasoto	3–6, 6–1, 1–6
Win	1–1	Jun 2013	ITF Changwon, South Korea	25,000	Hard	(China) Zhang Yuxuan	6–4, 6–4
Win	2–1	Jul 2013	Challenger de Granby, Canada	25,000	Hard	(United Kingdom) Samantha Murray	0–6, 7–5, 6–2
Loss	2–2	Nov 2014	Bendigo International, Australia	50,000	Hard	(Japan) Eri Hozumi	6–7^{(5)}, 7–5, 2–6
Loss	2–3	Nov 2014	Bendigo International 2, Australia	50,000	Hard	(China) Liu Fangzhou	4–6, 3–6
Loss	2–4	Jun 2015	ITF Goyang, South Korea	25,000	Hard	(South Korea) Lee So-ra	4–6, 6–3, 4–6
Win	3–4	Jun 2015	Incheon Open, South Korea	25,000	Hard	(China) Liu Chang	5–7, 7–6^{(4)}, 6–3
Win	4–4	Jul 2015	ITF Stuttgart-Vaihingen, Germany	25,000	Clay	(Switzerland) Romina Oprandi	6–4, 7–5
Loss	4–5	Dec 2015	ITF Bangkok, Thailand	25,000	Hard	(South Korea) Han Na-lae	2–6, 4–6
Loss	4–6	Jan 2016	ITF Hong Kong, China SAR	25,000	Hard	(Switzerland) Viktorija Golubic	3–6, 3–6
Win	5–6	Oct 2016	Bendigo International, Australia	50,000	Hard	(United States) Asia Muhammad	6–3, 6–3
Win	6–6	Nov 2016	Canberra International, Australia	50,000	Hard	(Italy) Georgia Brescia	6–4, 6–4
Loss	6–7	Jun 2018	ITF Singapore	25,000	Hard	(Israel) Julia Glushko	6–2, 1–6, 4–6
Loss	6–8	Jul 2018	ITF Nonthaburi, Thailand	25,000	Hard	(India) Ankita Raina	1–6, 3–6
Loss	6–9	Mar 2019	Clay Court International, Australia	W25	Clay	(Australia) Destanee Aiava	2–6, 2–6
Win	7–9	Jun 2019	ITF Jakarta, Indonesia	W25	Hard	(Netherlands) Arianne Hartono	6–4, 6–1

=== Doubles: 2 (2 runner-ups) ===
Legend $50/60,000 tournaments	Finals by surface Hard (0–2)

Result	Date	Tournament	Tier	Surface	Partner	Opponents	Score
Loss	Oct 2016	Bendigo International, Australia	50k	Hard	(Japan) Shuko Aoyama	(United States) Asia Muhammad (Australia) Arina Rodionova	4–6, 3–6
Loss	Oct 2018	Bendigo International, Australia	60k	Hard	(Japan) Eri Hozumi	(Australia) Ellen Perez (Australia) Arina Rodionova	5–7, 1–6
