= Bendigo International (tennis) =

- 2022 Bendigo International

Defunct tennis tournament
- Event name: Bendigo International
- Location: Bendigo, Australia
- Venue: Bendigo Tennis Association
- Surface: Hard
- Website: bendigotennis.com.au

Current champions (2022)
- Men's singles: (United States) Ernesto Escobedo
- Women's singles: (Belgium) Ysaline Bonaventure
- Men's doubles: (Belgium) Ruben Bemelmans (Germany) Daniel Masur
- Women's doubles: (Mexico) Fernanda Contreras (United States) Alycia Parks
ATP Tour
- Category: Challenger 80
- Draw: 48S / 4Q / 16D
- Prize money: $58,320
WTA Tour
- Category: ITF Women's W60
- Draw: 32S / 32Q / 16D
- Prize money: $60,000+H

The Bendigo International was a professional tennis tournament played on outdoor hardcourts. It was part of the ATP Challenger Tour and the ITF Women's World Tennis Tour, and held annually in Bendigo, Australia, from 2009 (for the women) until 2022.

From 2013 to 2014 there were two Women's events in the same year, held in consecutive weeks. In 2015, one of them was replaced by the Canberra Tennis International. The first edition of the ATP Challenger event was held in January 2020 and the second and last in 2022.

== Past finals ==
=== Women's singles ===
Year	Champion	Runner-up	Score
2022	(Belgium) Ysaline Bonaventure	(Andorra) Victoria Jiménez Kasintseva	6–3, 6–1
2020–21	cancelled due to the COVID-19 pandemic		
2019	(Australia) Lizette Cabrera	(Australia) Maddison Inglis	6–2, 6–3
2018	(Australia) Priscilla Hon	(Australia) Ellen Perez	6–4, 4–6, 7–5
2017	(Slovenia) Tamara Zidanšek	(Australia) Olivia Rogowska	5–7, 6–1, 6–0
2016	(Japan) Risa Ozaki	(United States) Asia Muhammad	6–3, 6–3
2015	(Japan) Misa Eguchi	(Japan) Hiroko Kuwata	7–6^{(7–5)}, 6–3
2014 (2)	(China) Liu Fangzhou	(Japan) Risa Ozaki	6–4, 6–3
2014 (1)	(Japan) Eri Hozumi	(Japan) Risa Ozaki	7–6^{(7–5)}, 5–7, 6–2
2013 (2)	(Australia) Casey Dellacqua (3)	(Australia) Tammi Patterson	6–3, 6–1
2013 (1)	(Australia) Casey Dellacqua (2)	(Thailand) Noppawan Lertcheewakarn	6–4, 6–4
2012	(Russia) Arina Rodionova	(Australia) Olivia Rogowska	6–4, 7–5
2011	(Australia) Casey Dellacqua	(Australia) Isabella Holland	6–2, 6–2
2010	(Hungary) Tímea Babos	(Bulgaria) Elitsa Kostova	3–6, 6–3, 7–5
2009	(Australia) Alicia Molik	(France) Irena Pavlovic	6–3, 6–4

=== Men's singles ===
Year	Champion	Runner-up	Score
2022	(United States) Ernesto Escobedo	(France) Enzo Couacaud	5–7, 6–3, 7–5
2021	cancelled due to the COVID-19 pandemic		
2020	(United States) Steve Johnson	(Italy) Stefano Travaglia	7–6^{(7–2)}, 7–6^{(7–3)}

=== Women's doubles ===
Year	Champions	Runners-up	Score
2022	(Mexico) Fernanda Contreras (United States) Alycia Parks	(Australia) Alison Bai (Australia) Alana Parnaby	6–3, 6–1
2020–21	cancelled due to the COVID-19 pandemic		
2019	(Australia) Maddison Inglis (Australia) Kaylah McPhee	(United Kingdom) Naiktha Bains (Slovakia) Tereza Mihalíková	3–6, 6–2, [10–2]
2018	(Australia) Ellen Perez (Australia) Arina Rodionova	(Japan) Eri Hozumi (Japan) Risa Ozaki	7–5, 6–1
2017	(Australia) Alison Bai (Australia) Zoe Hives	(United States) Asia Muhammad (Australia) Arina Rodionova	4–6, 6–4, [10–8]
2016	(United States) Asia Muhammad (Australia) Arina Rodionova	(Japan) Shuko Aoyama (Japan) Risa Ozaki	6–4, 6–3
2015	(United States) Lauren Embree (United States) Asia Muhammad	(Russia) Natela Dzalamidze (Japan) Hiroko Kuwata	7–5, 6–3
2014 (2)	(Australia) Jessica Moore (Australia) Abbie Myers	(Thailand) Varatchaya Wongteanchai (Thailand) Varunya Wongteanchai	3–6, 6–1, [10–6]
2014 (1)	(Australia) Jessica Moore (Australia) Abbie Myers	(Australia) Naiktha Bains (Australia) Karolina Wlodarczak	6–4, 6–0
2013 (2)	(Australia) Monique Adamczak (Australia) Olivia Rogowska	(Australia) Stephanie Bengson (Australia) Sally Peers	6–3, 2–6, [11–9]
2013 (1)	(Japan) Erika Sema (Japan) Yurika Sema	(Australia) Monique Adamczak (Australia) Olivia Rogowska	3–6, 6–2, [11–9]
2012	(Australia) Ashleigh Barty (Australia) Sally Peers	(Zimbabwe) Cara Black (Russia) Arina Rodionova	7–6^{(14–12)}, 7–6^{(7–5)}
2011	(Australia) Stephanie Bengson (Australia) Tyra Calderwood	(United Kingdom) Samantha Murray (Australia) Storm Sanders	2–6, 6–1, [10–5]
2010	(Hungary) Tímea Babos (United Kingdom) Melanie South	(Australia) Jarmila Groth (Australia) Jade Hopper	6–3, 6–2
2009	(France) Irena Pavlovic (Russia) Arina Rodionova	(United Kingdom) Jocelyn Rae (Australia) Emelyn Starr	6–3, 7–6^{(7–3)}

=== Men's doubles ===
Year	Champions	Runners-up	Score
2022	(Belgium) Ruben Bemelmans (Germany) Daniel Masur	(France) Enzo Couacaud (Slovenia) Blaž Rola	7–6^{(7–2)}, 6–4
2021	cancelled due to the COVID-19 pandemic		
2020	(Serbia) Nikola Ćaćić (Ukraine) Denys Molchanov	(El Salvador) Marcelo Arévalo (United Kingdom) Jonny O'Mara	7–6^{(7–3)}, 6–4
