= Lauren Embree =

American tennis player (born 1991)

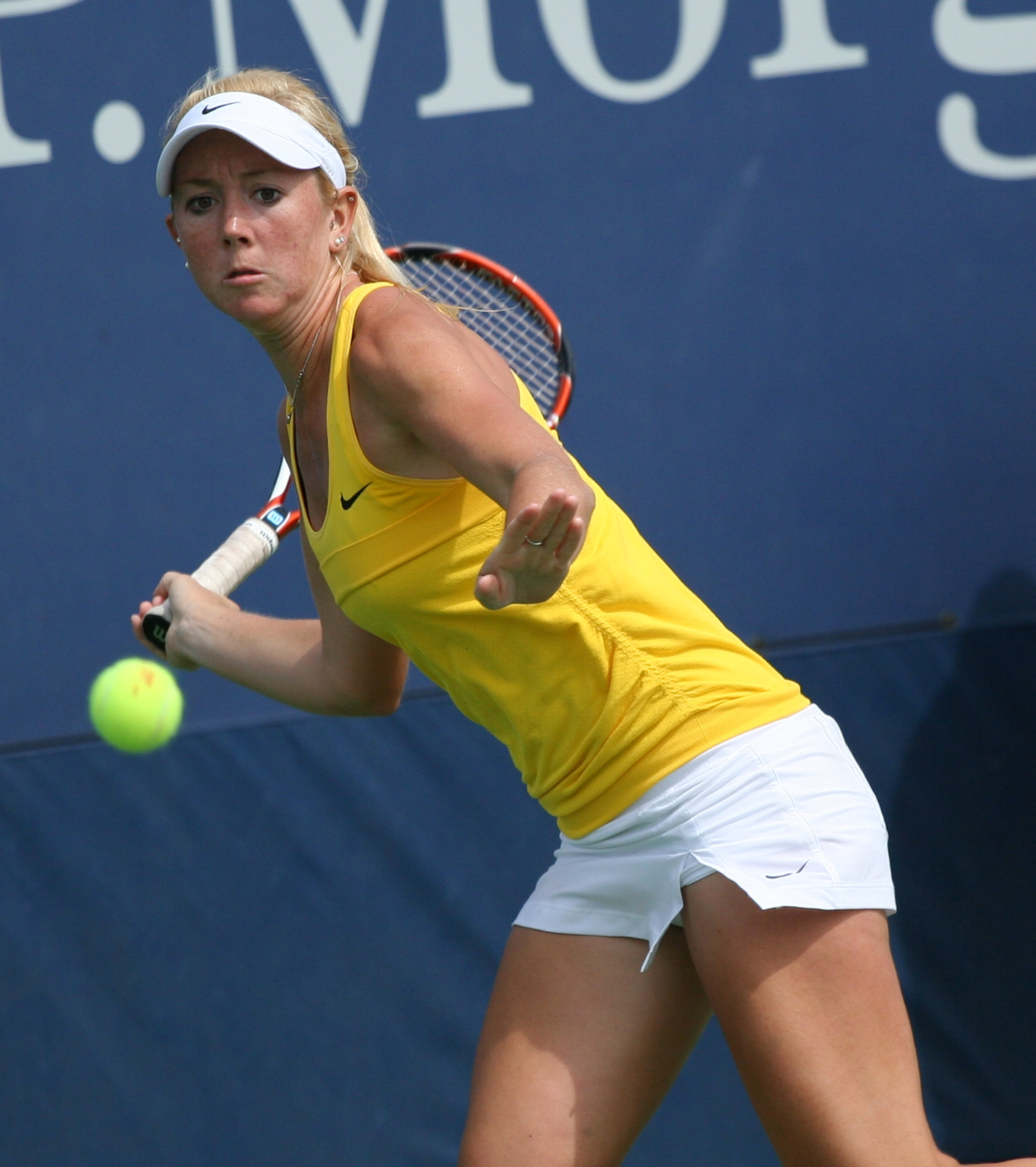
- Embree 2009 at the US Open junior tournament
- Country (sports): United States
- Born: January 10, 1991 (age 34); Naples, Florida
- Turned pro: 2013
- Plays: Right-handed
- College: University of Florida
- Prize money: $93,863

Singles
- Career record: 164–101
- Career titles: 2 ITF
- Highest ranking: No. 232 (July 13, 2015)

Grand Slam singles results
- French Open: 1R (2009)
- US Open: Q2 (2009)

Doubles
- Career record: 60–41
- Career titles: 5 ITF
- Highest ranking: No. 231 (April 18, 2016)

Lauren Embree (born January 10, 1991) is an American former professional tennis player.

Born in Naples, Florida, Embree made her USTA Pro Circuit debut at the age of 16. As a junior, she competed at the 2006 US Open and reached the round of 16 at the 2009 Australian Open.

Embree graduated from Lely High School in Naples in 2009, and in May of the same year, she qualified as a wild card for the 2009 French Open, her first participation in a Grand Slam tournament. She lost to Nadia Petrova in the first round, and turned down a €15,000 prize to remain an amateur.

She accepted an athletic scholarship to attend the University of Florida in Gainesville, Florida, where she played for coach Roland Thornqvist's Florida Gators women's tennis team in National Collegiate Athletic Association (NCAA) competition from 2009 to 2013. Embree was a key member of the Gators' national championship teams that won the NCAA women's tennis tournament in 2011 and 2012. She graduated from the University of Florida with a bachelor's degree in sports management in 2014.

Lauren signed with athletic apparel brand Athletic DNA and became their first female professional.

== ITF Circuit finals ==
=== Singles: 9 (2 titles, 7 runner-ups) ===
Legend $25,000 tournaments $10,000 tournaments	Finals by surface Hard (2–5) Clay (0–2)

Result	No.	Date	Tournament	Surface	Opponent	Score
Loss	1.	June 19, 2007	Fort Worth, United States	Hard	(Croatia) Jelena Pandžić	4–6, 1–6
Win	1.	June 23, 2008	Wichita, United States	Hard	(United States) Jamie Hampton	6–3, 6–4
Win	2.	July 29, 2013	ITF Fort Worth, United States	Hard	(Japan) Miyu Kato	3–6, 6–1, 3–1 ret.
Loss	2.	June 30, 2014	Todi, Italy	Clay	(Italy) Alice Savoretti	3–6, 3–6
Loss	3.	August 31, 2014	San Luis Potosí, Mexico	Hard	(Mexico) Marcela Zacarías	3–6, 6–3, 1–6
Loss	4.	September 13, 2014	Redding, United States	Hard	(United States) Jennifer Brady	2–6, 1–6
Loss	5.	October 6, 2014	Rock Hill, United States	Hard	(United States) CiCi Bellis	4–6, 0–6
Loss	6.	June 21, 2015	Sumter, United States	Hard	(Japan) Mayo Hibi	4–6, 6–3, 4–6
Loss	7.	11 June 2017	Bethany Beach, United States	Clay	(United States) Danielle Collins	1–6, 0–6

=== Doubles: 8 (5 titles, 3 runner-ups) ===
Legend $50,000 tournaments $25,000 tournaments $15,000 tournaments	Finals by surface Hard (4–3) Clay (1–0)

Result	No.	Date	Tournament	Surface	Partner	Opponents	Score
Loss	1.	July 2, 2012	Denver, US	Hard	(United States) Nicole Gibbs	(Canada) Marie-Ève Pelletier (United States) Shelby Rogers	3–6, 6–3, [10–12]
Loss	2.	July 1, 2013	Sacramento Challenger, US	Hard	(United States) Robin Anderson	(United Kingdom) Naomi Broady (Australia) Storm Sanders	3–6, 4–6
Win	1.	September 9, 2013	Redding, US	Hard	(United States) Robin Anderson	(United States) Jacqueline Cako (United States) Allie Kiick	6–4, 5–7, [10–7]
Win	2.	September 13, 2014	Redding, US	Hard	(United States) Jennifer Brady	(United States) Alexandra Facey (United States) Kat Facey	6–3, 6–2
Win	3.	October 24, 2015	Brisbane International, Australia	Hard	(United States) Asia Muhammad	(Thailand) Noppawan Lertcheewakarn (Thailand) Varatchaya Wongteanchai	6–2, 4–6, [11–9]
Loss	3.	November 2, 2015	Canberra International, Australia	Hard	(United States) Asia Muhammad	(Japan) Misa Eguchi (Japan) Eri Hozumi	6–7^{(13)}, 6–1, [12–14]
Win	4.	November 14, 2015	Bendigo International, Australia	Hard	(United States) Asia Muhammad	(Russia) Natela Dzalamidze (Japan) Hiroko Kuwata	7–5, 6–3
Win	5.	February 11, 2017	Manacor, Spain	Clay	(Chile) Alexa Guarachi	(United States) Jaeda Daniel (United States) Quinn Gleason	6–1, 7–5

== See also ==
- Florida Gators
