= Zuzana Zlochová =

Slovak tennis player

- Country (sports): Slovakia
- Born: 24 January 1990 (age 36)
- Height: 1.68 m (5 ft 6 in)
- Plays: Right-handed (two-handed backhand)
- Prize money: $181,021

Singles
- Career record: 422–304
- Career titles: 14 ITF
- Highest ranking: No. 263 (28 January 2013)

Doubles
- Career record: 167–151
- Career titles: 15 ITF
- Highest ranking: No. 281 (5 May 2014)
- Last updated on: 12 May 2026.

Zuzana Zlochová (born 24 January 1990) is a Slovak former tennis player.

Zlochová made her WTA Tour main-draw debut at the 2021 Swedish Open in the singles tournament, and in the doubles main draw, partnering Karman Thandi.

In 2011, she lost her singles final at Solin in Dalmatia to Croatian Dijana Banoveć. In 2013, Zlochová won the doubles tournament in Adana, Turkey.

In 2014, Zlochová was awarded the Crystal Peacock Award.
