= Misa Eguchi =

Japanese tennis player (born 1992)

Misa Eguchi 江口 実沙
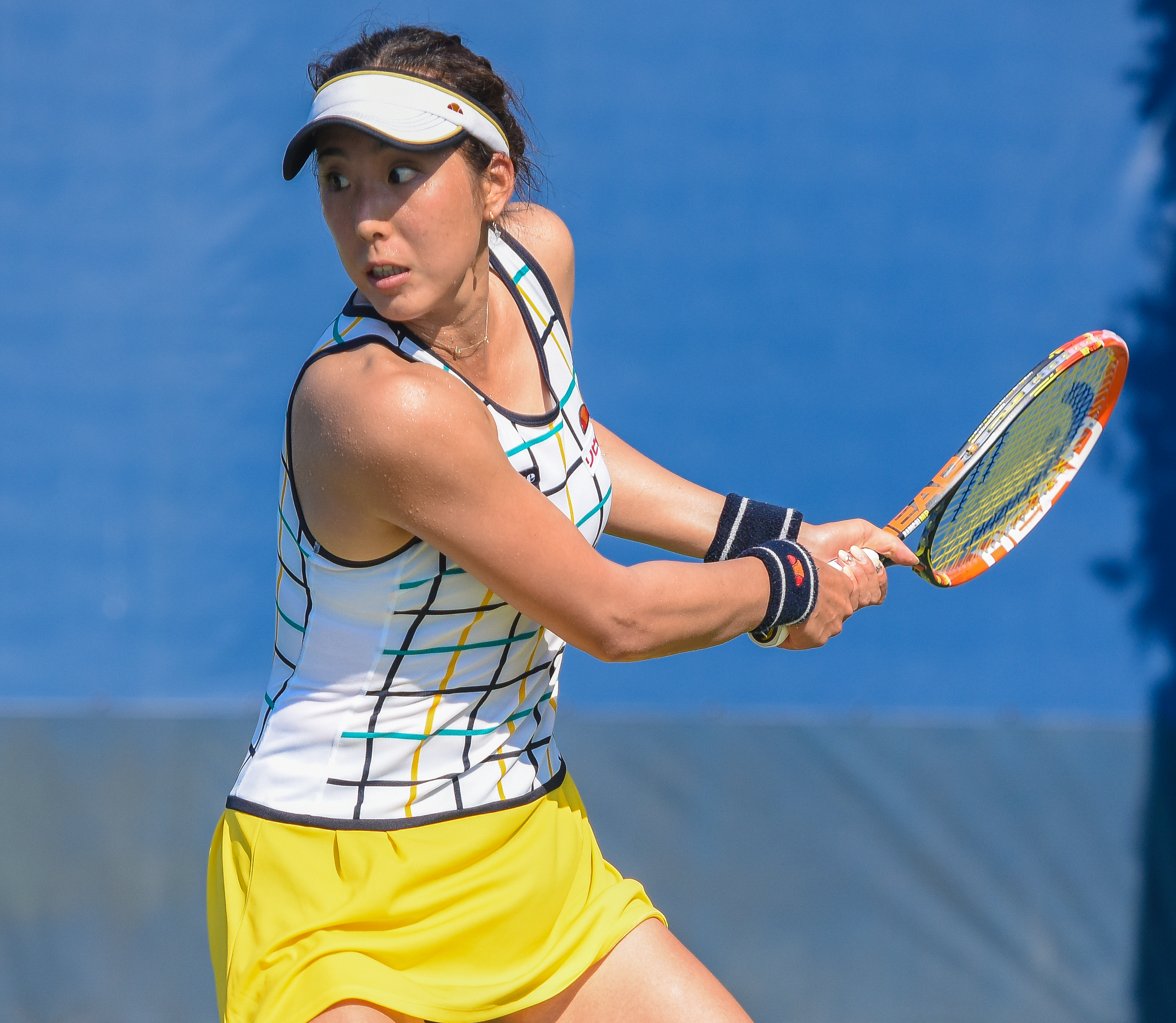
- Eguchi at the 2015 US Open qualifying
- Country (sports): Japan
- Born: 18 April 1992 (age 33) Ogōri, Japan
- Height: 1.73 m (5 ft 8 in)
- Retired: 2018
- Plays: Right-handed (two-handed backhand)
- Prize money: $424,199

Singles
- Career record: 235–208
- Career titles: 6 ITF
- Highest ranking: No. 109 (12 September 2016)

Grand Slam singles results
- Australian Open: 1R (2018)
- French Open: Q1 (2012, 2014, 2015, 2016)
- Wimbledon: Q2 (2014, 2016)
- US Open: 1R (2017)

Doubles
- Career record: 106–118
- Career titles: 7 ITF
- Highest ranking: No. 185 (17 November 2014)
Medal record
Representing Japan
Asian Games
Bronze medal – third place	2014 Incheon	women's singles
Bronze medal – third place	2014 Incheon	women's team

Misa Eguchi (江口 実沙, Eguchi Misa; born 18 April 1992) is a former professional Japanese tennis player.

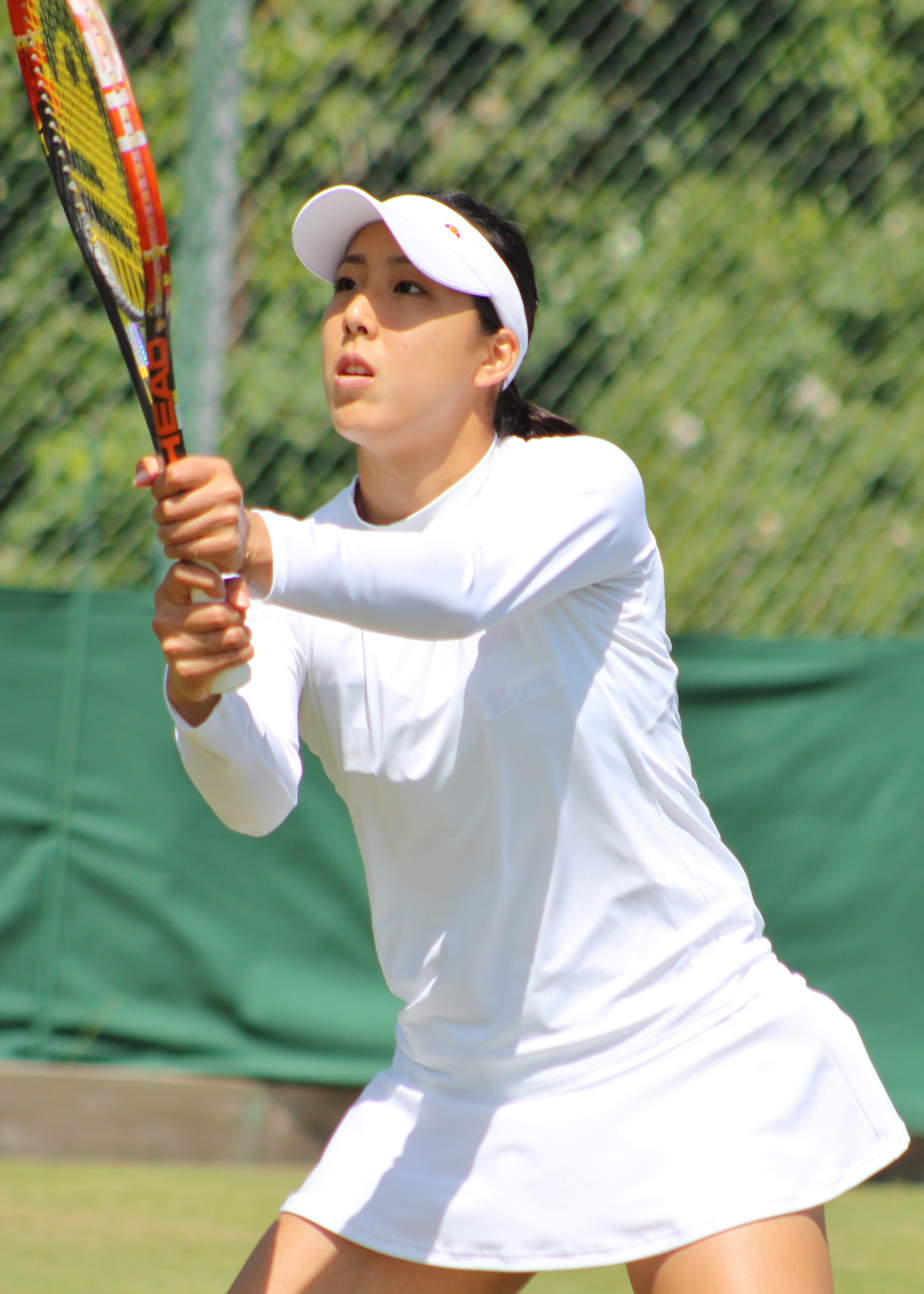
Eguchi in Wimbledon, 2014

In her career, she won six singles and seven doubles titles on the ITF Women's Circuit. On 12 September 2016, she reached her career-high singles ranking of world No. 109. On 17 November 2014, she peaked at No. 185 in the WTA doubles rankings.

Eguchi won her first $50k title at the 2014 Burnie International, defeating Elizaveta Kulichkova in the final. Six months later, she advanced to her first ever WTA Tour quarterfinal at the Baku Cup, losing in three sets to Bojana Jovanovski.

== WTA 125 tournament finals ==
=== Singles: 1 (runner–up) ===
Result	Date	Tournament	Surface	Opponent	Score
Loss	Sep 2016	Dalian Women's Open, China	Hard	(Czech Republic) Kristýna Plíšková	5–7, 6–4, 5–2 ret.

=== Doubles: 1 (runner–up) ===
Result	Date	Tournament	Surface	Partner	Opponents	Score
Loss	Sep 2014	Suzhou Ladies Open, China	Hard	(Japan) Eri Hozumi	(Chinese Taipei) Chan Chin-wei (Chinese Taipei) Chuang Chia-jung	1–6, 6–3, [7–10]

== ITF Circuit finals ==
=== Singles: 11 (6 titles, 5 runner–ups) ===
Legend $50,000 tournaments $25,000 tournaments $15,000 tournaments $10,000 tournaments	Finals by surface Hard (5–3) Clay (0–0) Grass (0–1) Carpet (1–1)

Result	W–L	Date	Tournament	Tier	Surface	Opponent	Score
Win	1–0	Apr 2011	ITF Bangkok, Thailand	10,000	Hard	(China) Lu Jiajing	6–1, 6–1
Win	2–0	May 2011	ITF Karuizawa, Japan	25,000	Carpet	(Japan) Rika Fujiwara	6–3, 6–3
Loss	2–1	Jun 2011	ITF Tokyo, Japan	10,000	Hard	(Japan) Akiko Omae	3–6, 4–6
Loss	2–2	Sep 2011	ITF Noto, Japan	25,000	Carpet	(Belgium) Tamaryn Hendler	6–7^{(4)}, 1–6
Loss	2–3	Sep 2012	ITF Noto, Japan	25,000	Grass	(Japan) Kazusa Ito	2–6, 4–6
Loss	2–4	Feb 2013	ITF Sydney, Australia	10,000	Hard	(China) Wang Yafan	2–6, 0–6
Win	3–4	Jan 2014	Burnie International, Australia	50,000	Hard	(Russia) Elizaveta Kulichkova	4–6, 6–2, 6–3
Win	4–4	Feb 2014	ITF Port Pirie, Australia	15,000	Hard	(Japan) Hiroko Kuwata	6–1, 6–2
Loss	4–5	Apr 2014	ITF Seoul, South Korea	50,000	Hard	(Japan) Misaki Doi	1–6, 6–7^{(3)}
Win	5–5	Oct 2015	ITF Toowoomba, Australia	25,000	Hard	(Sweden) Susanne Celik	7–6^{(6)}, 7–5
Win	6–5	Nov 2015	Bendigo International, Australia	50,000	Hard	(Japan) Hiroko Kuwata	7–6^{(5)}, 6–3

=== Doubles: 11 (7 titles, 4 runner–ups) ===
Legend $50/60,000 tournaments $25,000 tournaments $15,000 tournaments $10,000 tournaments	Finals by surface Hard (6–1) Clay (1–2) Grass (0–1) Carpet (0–0)

Result	W–L	Date	Tournament	Tier	Surface	Partner	Opponents	Score
Loss	0–1	Jun 2011	ITF Pattaya, Thailand	10,000	Hard	(Japan) Akiko Omae	(China) Liang Chen (China) Zhao Yijing	3–6, 4–6
Loss	0–2	May 2012	Fukuoka International, Japan	50,000	Grass	(Japan) Akiko Omae	(Australia) Monique Adamczak (Australia) Stephanie Bengson	4–6, 4–6
Win	1–2	Feb 2013	ITF Sydney, Australia	10,000	Hard	(Japan) Mari Tanaka	(Serbia) Tamara Čurović (China) Wang Yafan	4–6, 7–5, [10–8]
Loss	1–3	Jul 2013	ITF Waterloo, Canada	50,000	Clay	(Japan) Eri Hozumi	(Canada) Gabriela Dabrowski (Canada) Sharon Fichman	6–7^{(6)}, 3–6
Win	2–3	Dec 2013	ITF Hong Kong	25,000	Hard	(Japan) Eri Hozumi	(Kazakhstan) Zarina Diyas (Hong Kong) Zhang Ling	6–4, 6–2
Win	3–3	Feb 2014	ITF Salisbury, Australia	15,000	Hard	(Japan) Miki Miyamura	(South Korea) Jang Su-jeong (South Korea) Lee So-ra	6–2, 6–2
Win	4–3	Oct 2015	ITF Toowoomba, Australia	25,000	Hard	(Japan) Eri Hozumi	(United States) Veronica Corning (United States) Jessica Wacnik	4–6, 7–5, [10–5]
Win	5–3	Nov 2015	Canberra International, Australia	50,000	Hard	(Japan) Eri Hozumi	(United States) Lauren Embree (United States) Asia Muhammad	7–6^{(13)}, 1–6, [14–12]
Loss	5–4	Jul 2017	Reinert Open, Germany	60,000	Clay	(Japan) Akiko Omae	(Germany) Katharina Gerlach (Germany) Julia Wachaczyk	6–4, 1–6, [7–10]
Win	6–4	Nov 2017	ITF Vinaròs, Spain	15,000	Clay	(Japan) Akiko Omae	(India) Snehadevi Reddy (Ecuador) Charlotte Römer	6–2, 6–2
Win	7–4	Feb 2018	ITF Kofu, Japan	25,000	Hard	(Japan) Misaki Doi	(Japan) Megumi Nishimoto (Japan) Kotomi Takahata	6–3, 6–7^{(2)}, [10–8]
