= Alizé Lim =

French tennis player (born 1990)

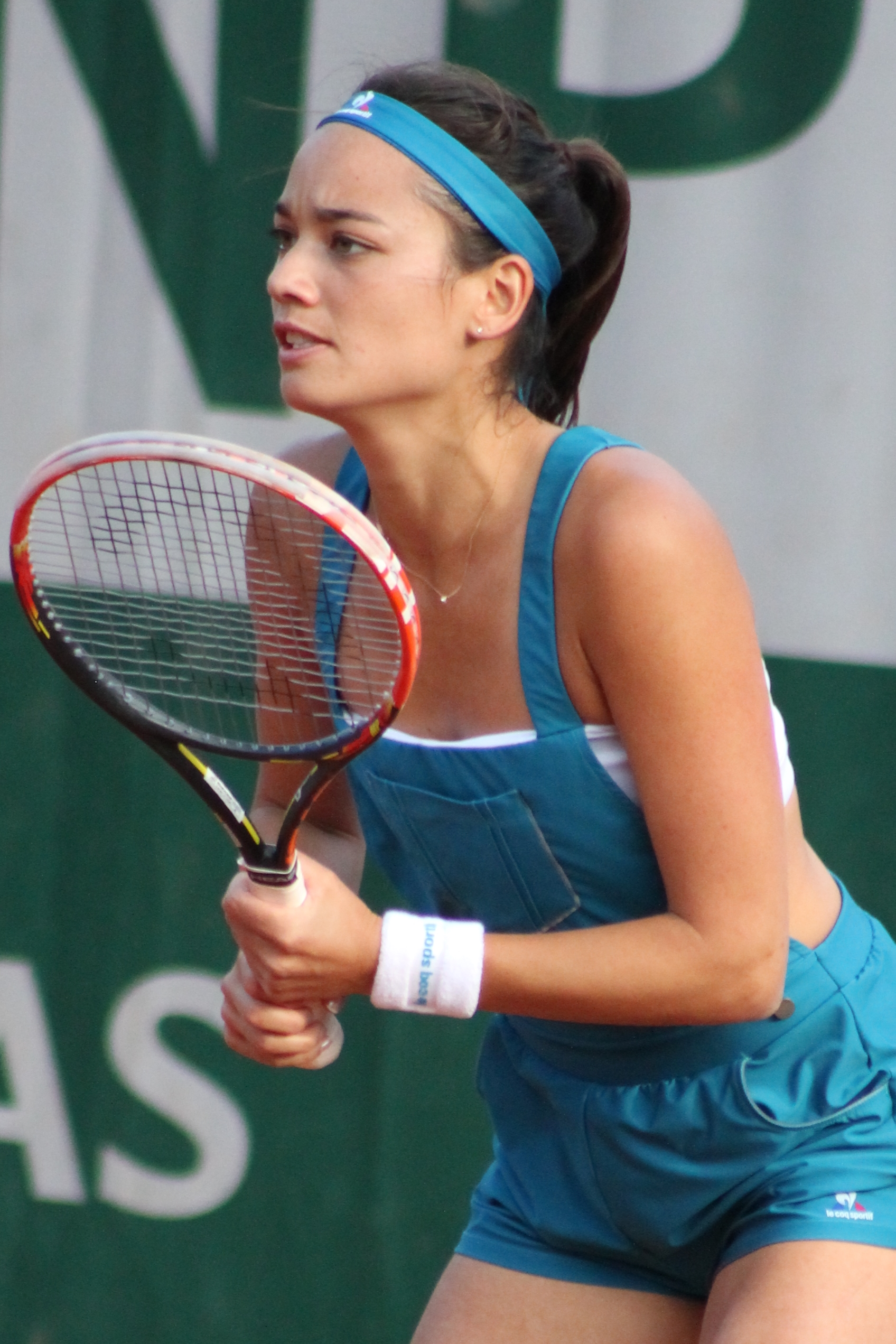
- Alize Lim at the 2016 French Open
- Country (sports): France
- Born: July 13, 1990 (age 36) Paris, France
- Height: 173 cm (5 ft 8 in)
- Turned pro: 2007
- Plays: Right (two-handed backhand)
- Prize money: $492,196

Singles
- Career record: 310–284
- Career titles: 3 ITF
- Highest ranking: No. 135 (26 May 2014)
- Current ranking: No. 650 (18 May 2026)

Grand Slam singles results
- Australian Open: Q3 (2014)
- French Open: 1R (2014, 2015, 2016, 2017)
- Wimbledon: Q1 (2014, 2016)
- US Open: Q3 (2015)

Doubles
- Career record: 119–131
- Career titles: 6 ITF
- Highest ranking: No. 148 (7 November 2016)
- Current ranking: No. 1387 (18 May 2026)

Grand Slam doubles results
- French Open: 1R (2011, 2013, 2014, 2015, 2016, 2017)
- Last updated on: 25 May 2026.

Alizé Lim (born 13 July 1990) is a French tennis player. Her career high WTA singles ranking is world No. 135, reached on 26 May 2014, and her career high doubles ranking is No. 148, attained on 7 November 2016.

== Career ==
Alize Lim made her Grand Slam debut at the 2011 French Open where she and her French partner Victoria Larrière received a wildcard for the doubles main draw, and lost to sixth seeds Bethanie Mattek-Sands and Meghann Shaughnessy, 2–6, 1–6, in the first round.

In 2014, Alize Lim made her major singles debut at the French Open with a wildcard and again lost in the first round of the main draw, to occasional training partner and then-world No. 1, Serena Williams, 2–6, 1–6.

Alize Lim worked with Eurosport during the 2022 Australian Open, and presented their coverage of the event with Mats Wilander, Tim Henman, and Johanna Konta. She also presented the 2024 Summer Olympics for France Télévisions on the online channel dedicated to the event.

== Personal life ==
Born in France, Alizé Lim is of Vietnamese descent through her father.

From 2021 to 2024, Lim dated former NBA player Tony Parker.

== Grand Slam performance ==
Key
W	F	SF	QF	#R	RR	Q#	P#	DNQ	A	Z#	PO	G	S	B	NMS	NTI	P	NH

(W) winner; (F) finalist; (SF) semifinalist; (QF) quarterfinalist; (#R) rounds 4, 3, 2, 1; (RR) round-robin stage; (Q#) qualification round; (P#) preliminary round; (DNQ) did not qualify; (A) absent; (Z#) Davis/Fed Cup Zonal Group (with number indication) or (PO) play-off; (G) gold, (S) silver or (B) bronze Olympic/Paralympic medal; (NMS) not a Masters tournament; (NTI) not a Tier I tournament; (P) postponed; (NH) not held; (SR) strike rate (events won / competed); (W–L) win–loss record.
To avoid confusion and double counting, these charts are updated at the conclusion of a tournament or when the player's participation has ended.

=== Singles ===
Tournament	2011	2012	2013	2014	2015	2016	2017	2018	2019	...	2022	W - L
Australian Open	A	A	A	Q3	A	Q2	Q1	A	A		A	0–0
French Open	A	Q1	Q2	1R	1R	1R	1R	A	Q1		A	0–4
Wimbledon	A	A	A	A	A	Q1	A	A	A		A	0–0
US Open	Q1	A	Q1	Q1	Q3	Q2	A	A	A		A	0–0
Win - Lose	0–0	0–0	0–0	0–1	0–1	0–1	0–1	0–0	0–0		0–0	0–4

== ITF Circuit finals ==
=== Singles: 14 (3 titles, 11 runner-ups) ===
Legend $50,000 tournaments $25,000 tournaments $10/15,000 tournaments	Finals by surface Hard (1–5) Clay (2–6)

Result	W - L	Date	Tournament	Tier	Surface	Opponent	Score
Lose	0–1	Jan 2010	ITF Saint-Martin, Guadeloupe	10,000	Hard	(France) Natalie Piquion	6–7^{(4)}, 1–6
Win	1–1	Jan 2010	ITF Le Gosier, Guadeloupe	10,000	Hard	(France) Natalie Piquion	6–1, 6–2
Win	2–1	Aug 2010	ITF Tampere, Finland	10,000	Clay	(France) Amandine Hesse	6–4, 6–3
Lose	2–2	Nov 2010	ITF Toronto, Canada	50,000	Hard (i)	(United Kingdom) Heather Watson	3–6, 3–6
Lose	2–3	June 2011	ITF Campobasso, Italy	25,000	Clay	(Italy) Karin Knapp	2–6, 4–6
Lose	2–4	May 2012	ITF São José dos Campos, Brazil	10,000	Clay	(Venezuela) Gabriela Paz	4–6, 4–6
Lose	2–5	Oct 2013	ITF La Vall d'Uixó, Spain	25,000	Clay	(Netherlands) Arantxa Rus	1–6, 1–6
Lose	2–6	Mar 2015	ITF Amiens, France	10,000	Clay (i)	(Ukraine) Olga Ianchuk	6–3, 3–6, 4–6
Lose	2 - 7	Apr 2015	ITF Pula, Italy	25,000	Clay	(Germany) Anne Schäfer	6–4, 6–3
Win	3–7	Jul 2015	ITF Turin, Italy	25,000	Clay	(Bulgaria) Dia Evtimova	3–6, 6–4, 6–4
Lose	3–8	Oct 2015	Abierto Tampico, Mexico	50,000	Hard	(Spain) Lourdes Domínguez Lino	5–7, 4–6
Lose	3–9	Mar 2016	ITF Campinas, Brazil	25,000	Clay	(Ukraine) Dayana Yastremska	4–6, 4–6
Lose	3–10	Jun 2018	ITF Sumter, United States	25,000	Hard	(United States) Taylor Townsend	w/o
Lose	3–11	Jan 2026	ITF Cayenne (French Guiana), France	W15	Hard	(Netherlands) Jasmijn Gimbrère	4–6, 4–6

=== Doubles: 18 (7 titles, 11 runner-ups) ===
Legend $25,000 tournaments $10/15,000 tournaments	Finals by surface Hard (5–2) Clay (2–9)

Result	W - L	Date	Tournament	Tier	Surface	Partner	Opponents	Score
Lose	0–1	May 2009	ITF Bournemouth, UK	10,000	Clay	(France) Elixane Lechemia	(United Kingdom) Stephanie Cornish (Hungary) Tímea Babos	w/o
Lose	0–2	Aug 2009	ITF Tampere, Finland	10,000	Clay	(Italy) Vivienne Vierin	(Sweden) Sandra Roma (Finland) Emma Laine	4–6, 3–6
Lose	0–3	Nov 2009	ITF Le Havre, France	10,000	Clay (i)	(France) Amandine Hesse	(Romania) Mihaela Buzărnescu (Russia) Marina Melnikova	2–6, 6–7^{(4–7)}
Win	1–3	Jan 2010	ITF Le Gosier, France	10,000	Hard	(Denmark) Malou Ejdesgaard	(United States) Kayla Rizzolo (United States) Katie Ruckert	6–1, 5–7, [10–3]
Lose	1 - 4	Mar 2010	ITF Amiens, France	10,000	Clay (i)	(France) Sherazad Benamar	(Israel) Efrat Mishor (Bosnia and Herzegovina) Jasmina Tinjić	6–7^{(5–7)}, 7–5, [5–10]
Lose	1 - 5	Mar 2010	ITF Cairo, Egypt	10,000	Clay	(United States) Ivana King	(Czech Republic) Jana Jandová (Czech Republic) Dominika Kaňáková	2–6, 2–6
Win	2–5	Aug 2010	ITF Fleurus, Belgium	10,000	Clay	(Romania) Diana Enache	(Belgium) Gally De Wael (Morocco) Fatima El Allami	6–0, 6–3
Lose	2–6	Oct 2010	ITF Clermont-Ferrand, France	25,000	Hard	(France) Elixane Lechemia	(France) Youlia Fedossova (France) Iryna Brémond	6–7^{(5–7)}, 3–6
Lose	2–7	Dec 2010	ITF Rio de Janeiro, Brazil	25,000	Clay	(Argentina) Paula Ormaechea	(Brazil) Maria Fernanda Alves (Brazil) Ana Clara Duarte	w/o
Lose	2–8	Mar 2012	ITF Fort Walton Beach, United States	25,000	Hard	(Russia) Elena Bovina	(United States) Madison Brengle (Poland) Paula Kania	3–6, 4–6
Lose	2–9	May 2012	ITF Brasília, Brazil	25,000	Clay	(Bulgaria) Aleksandrina Naydenova	(Bolivia) María Fernanda Álvarez Terán (Venezuela) Gabriela Paz	2–6, 4–6
Win	3–9	Mar 2013	ITF Innisbrook, United States	25,000	Clay	(Australia) Ashleigh Barty	(Brazil) Paula Cristina Gonçalves (Argentina) María Irigoyen	6–1, 6–3
Lose	3–10	Jun 2013	ITF Kristinehamn, Sweden	25,000	Clay	(United States) Julia Cohen	(Kazakhstan) Anna Danilina (Russia) Olga Doroshina	5–7, 3–6
Lose	3–11	Sep 2013	ITF Mont-de-Marsan, France	25,000	Clay	(France) Laura Thorpe	(Chile) Cecilia Costa Melgar (Chile) Daniela Seguel	4–6, 2–6
Win	4–11	Sep 2014	GB Pro-Series Barnstaple, UK	25,000	Hard (i)	(Germany) Carina Witthöft	(Switzerland) Viktorija Golubic (Latvia) Diāna Marcinkēviča	6–2, 6–1
Win	5–11	Oct 2014	ITF Perth, Australia	25,000	Hard	(Ukraine) Veronika Kapshay	(Australia) Jessica Moore (Australia) Abbie Myers	6–2, 2–6, [10–7]
Win	6–11	Feb 2016	Open de l'Isère, France	25,000	Hard (i)	(France) Manon Arcangioli	(Belarus) Lidziya Marozava (Switzerland) Amra Sadiković	7–5, 6–2
Win	7–11	Jan 2026	ITF Cayenne (French Guiana), France	W15	Hard	(France) Astrid Cirotte	(Morocco) Yasmine Kabbaj (France) Pauline Payet	6–4, 7–6^{(4)}
