= Susanne Celik =

Swedish tennis player

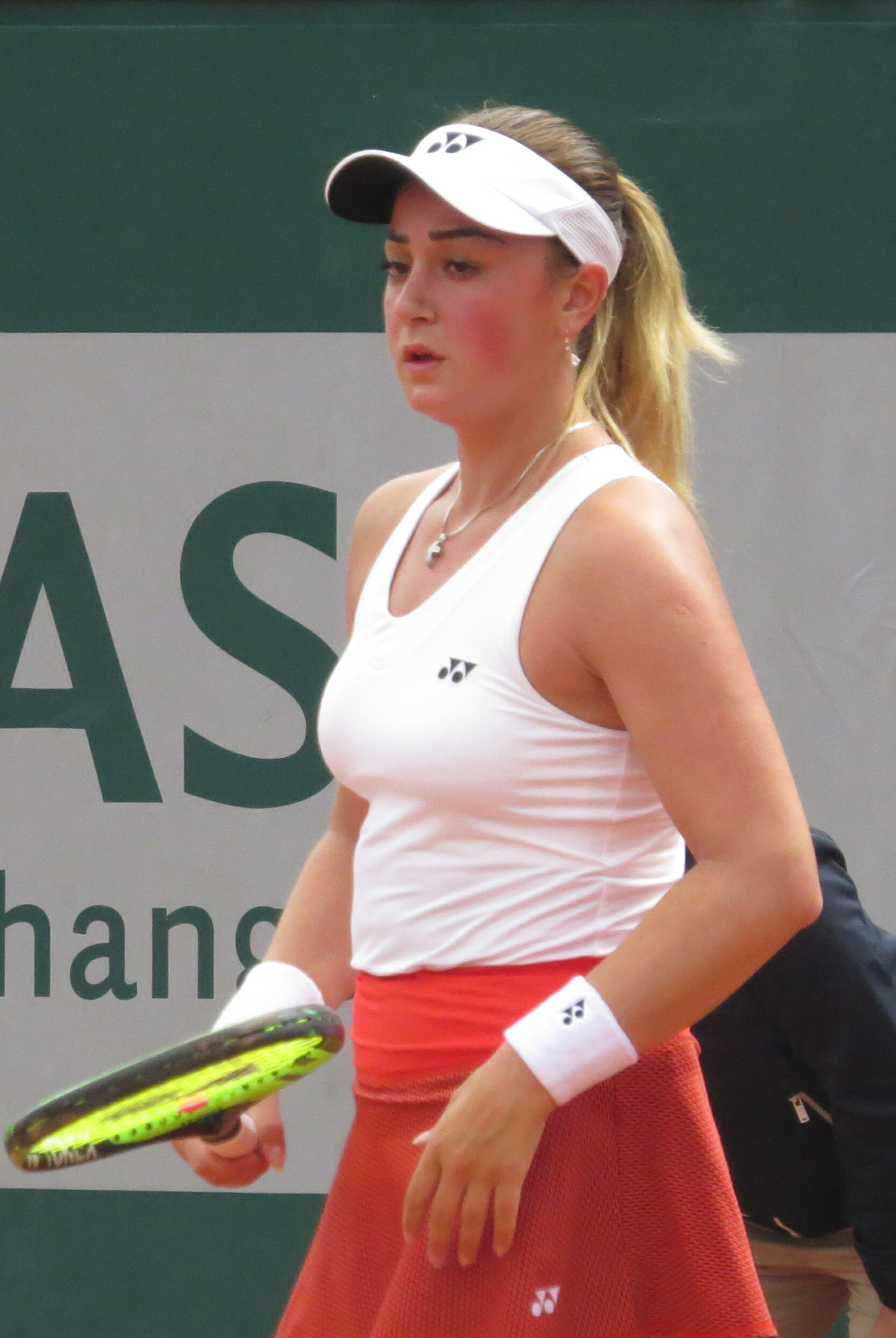
- During the 2019 French Open qualifying
- Country (sports): Sweden
- Born: 6 December 1994 (age 30); Örebro, Sweden
- Plays: Right-handed (two-handed backhand)
- Prize money: US$ 123,562

Singles
- Career record: 180–132
- Career titles: 7 ITF
- Highest ranking: No. 153 (18 July 2016)

Grand Slam singles results
- French Open: Q1 (2019)
- US Open: Q1 (2016, 2019)

Doubles
- Career record: 54–76
- Career titles: 4 ITF
- Highest ranking: No. 404 (15 August 2016)

Susanne Celik (born 6 December 1994) is a Swedish former tennis player of Assyrian descent. She has a WTA career-high singles ranking of 153, achieved on 18 July 2016, and a best doubles ranking of world No. 404, reached on 15 August 2016. She won seven singles and four doubles titles on the ITF Women's Circuit.

Playing for Sweden Fed Cup team, Celik has a win–loss record of 0–5.

== ITF Circuit finals ==
=== Singles: 16 (7 titles, 9 runner–ups) ===
Legend $25,000 tournaments $10/15,000 tournaments	Finals by surface Hard (5–7) Clay (2–2)

Result	W–L	Date	Tournament	Tier	Surface	Opponent	Score
Win	1–0	Jun 2013	ITF Sharm El Sheikh, Egypt	10,000	Hard	(Austria) Pia König	6–4, 6–0
Loss	1–1	Aug 2013	ITF Sharm El Sheikh, Egypt	10,000	Hard	(Russia) Anna Morgina	3–6, 6–1, 6–7^{(2)}
Loss	1–2	Oct 2013	ITF Antalya, Turkey	10,000	Clay	(Russia) Julia Samuseva	1–6, 0–6
Loss	1–3	Nov 2013	ITF Helsinki, Finland	10,000	Hard (i)	(Latvia) Jeļena Ostapenko	5–7, 6–4, 5–7
Win	2–3	May 2014	Incheon Open, South Korea	25,000	Hard	(China) Han Xinyun	4–6, 6–3, 6–4
Win	3–3	May 2014	ITF Sharm El Sheikh, Egypt	10,000	Hard	(Egypt) Ola Abou Zekry	6–1, 6–2
Loss	3–4	Oct 2015	ITF Toowoomba, Australia	25,000	Hard	(Japan) Misa Eguchi	6–7^{(6)}, 5–7
Loss	3–5	Mar 2016	ITF Antalya, Turkey	10,000	Hard	(Bulgaria) Viktoriya Tomova	6–4, 2–6, 5–7
Win	4–5	Apr 2016	Kōfu International Open, Japan	25,000	Hard	(China) Zhu Lin	7–6^{(3)}, 6–3
Win	5–5	Apr 2016	ITF Changwon, South Korea	25,000	Hard	(United States) Kristie Ahn	6–2, 6–0
Loss	5–6	May 2016	Grado Tennis Cup, Italy	25,000	Clay	(Romania) Ana Bogdan	6–2, 2–6, 6–7^{(1)}
Win	6–6	Jun 2016	ITF Ystad, Sweden	25,000	Clay	(Uzbekistan) Akgul Amanmuradova	6–1, 6–3
Win	7–6	Jul 2016	ITF Helsingborg, Sweden	25,000	Clay	(Chile) Daniela Seguel	6–4, 6–2
Loss	7–7	Sep 2018	ITF Monastir, Tunisia	15,000	Hard	(Italy) Claudia Giovine	3–6, 3–6
Loss	7–8	Jul 2019	ITF Dijon, France	15,000	Hard	(France) Mathilde Armitano	1–6, 3–6
Loss	7–9	Mar 2020	ITF Monastir, Tunisia	15,000	Hard	(Bosnia and Herzegovina) Nefisa Berberović	2–6, 0–6

=== Doubles: 6 (4 titles, 2 runner–ups) ===
Legend $25,000 tournaments $10,000 tournaments	Finals by surface Hard (4–1) Clay (0–1)

Result	W–L	Date	Tournament	Tier	Surface	Partner	Opponents	Score
Loss	0–1	Aug 2013	ITF Sharm El Sheikh, Egypt	10,000	Hard	(Japan) Sanae Ohta	(Belgium) Elke Lemmens (Germany) Linda Prenkovic	0–6, 6–7^{(8)}
Win	1–1	Nov 2013	ITF Stockholm, Sweden	10,000	Hard (i)	(Sweden) Donika Bashota	(Sweden) Emma Ek (Slovakia) Zuzana Luknarová	6–1, 6–4
Win	2–1	Mar 2014	ITF Antalya, Turkey	10,000	Hard	(Japan) Kotomi Takahata	(Czech Republic) Barbora Krejciková (Turkey) Ipek Soylu	6–4, 6–3
Win	3–1	May 2014	ITF Sharm El Sheikh	10,000	Hard	(Greece) Eleni Kordolaimi	(United Kingdom) Sabrina Bamburac (Spain) Arabela Fernandez Rabener	6–1, 7–6^{(2)}
Win	4–1	Jun 2014	ITF Sharm El Sheikh	10,000	Hard	(Greece) Eleni Kordolaimi	(Romania) Elena-Teodora Cadar (Spain) Arabela Fernandez Rabener	7–5, 6–2
Loss	4–2	Jul 2015	ITF Turin, Italy	25,000	Clay	(Latvia) Diāna Marcinkeviča	(Switzerland) Xenia Knoll (Italy) Alice Matteucci	5–7, 2–6

== Fed Cup participation ==
=== Singles (0–4) ===
Edition	Stage	Date	Location	Against	Surface	Opponent	W/L	Score
2015 Fed Cup; World Group II	Play-off	18 April 2015	Bratislava, Slovakia	Slovakia	Clay (i)	(Slovakia) Daniela Hantuchová	L	2–6, 0–6
2016 Fed Cup; Europe/Africa Zone Group I	Pool A	4 February 2016	Eilat, Israel	Portugal	Hard	(Portugal) Maria João Koehler	L	3–6, 4–6
2016 Fed Cup; Europe/Africa Zone Group I	Pool A	5 February 2016	Eilat, Israel	Ukraine	Hard	(Ukraine) Kateryna Bondarenko	L	1–6, 3–6
2016 Fed Cup; Europe/Africa Zone Group I	Play-off	6 February 2016	Eilat, Israel	Turkey	Hard	(Turkey) İpek Soylu	L	3–6, 2–6

=== Doubles (0–1) ===
Edition	Stage	Date	Location	Against	Surface	Partner	Opponents	W/L	Score
2015 Fed Cup; World Group II	Play-off	19 April 2015	Bratislava, Slovakia	Slovakia	Clay (i)	(Sweden) Rebecca Peterson	(Slovakia) Jana Čepelová (Slovakia) Anna Karolína Schmiedlová	L	6–4, 3–6, [7–10]
