= Abbie Myers =

Australian tennis player

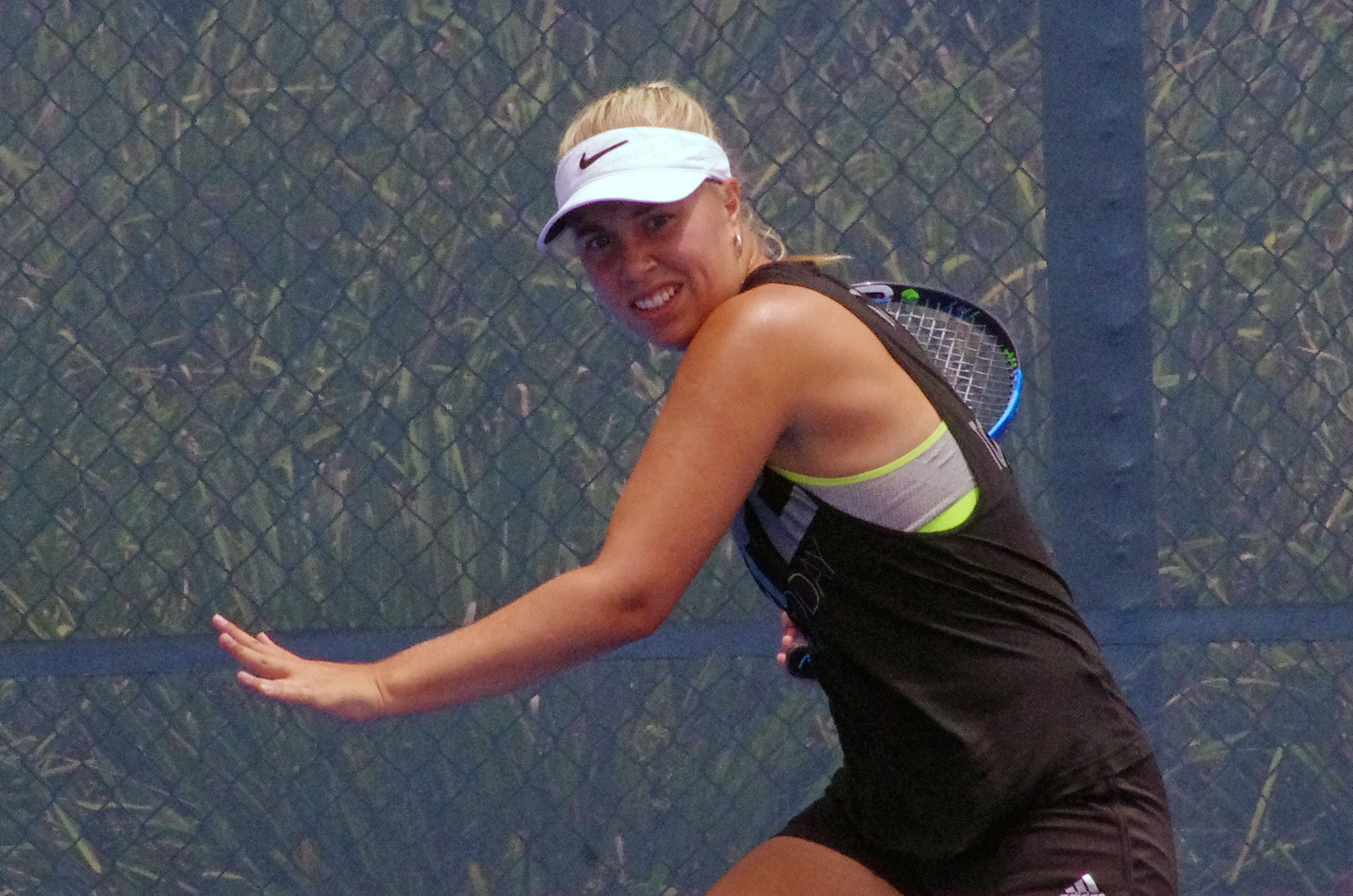
- Myers in 2017
- Full name: Abbie Jane Myers
- Country (sports): Australia
- Born: 18 July 1994 (age 31) Sydney,Australia
- Height: 1.75 m (5 ft 9 in)
- Plays: Right (two-handed backhand)
- Prize money: US$190,800

Singles
- Career record: 176–188
- Career titles: 1 ITF
- Highest ranking: No. 257 (29 April 2019)

Grand Slam singles results
- Australian Open: Q1 (2013, 2017, 2020, 2021, 2022)

Doubles
- Career record: 162–111
- Career titles: 17 ITF
- Highest ranking: No. 182 (20 July 2015)

Grand Slam doubles results
- Australian Open: 1R (2015, 2021)

Abbie Jane Myers (born 18 July 1994) is an Australian former professional tennis player. She has career-high WTA rankings of 257 in singles and 182 in doubles. Over her career, Myers won one singles title and 17 doubles titles on the ITF Women's Circuit.

She notably represented Australia at the World Junior Competition at the age of 14. On the ITF Junior Circuit, Myers reached a career-high ranking of 52, on 2 January 2012, and she won the 2012 Australian 18's Championships.

== Career ==
=== 2013–21 ===
Myers made her WTA Tour main-draw debut at the 2013 Sydney International doubles tournament, partnering Storm Sanders. They lost in the first round. At the 2013 Australian Open, she lost in the first round of the qualifying draw to Chan Yung-jan.

=== 2022 ===
In January, Myers lost in the first round of the Australian Open qualifying.

== ITF Circuit finals ==
=== Singles: 3 (1 title, 2 runner-ups) ===
Legend $60,000 tournaments $25,000 tournaments $10,000 tournaments	Finals by surface Hard (1–1) Carpet (0–1)

Result	W–L	Date	Tournament	Tier	Surface	Opponent	Score
Win	1–0	Aug 2014	ITF Sharm El Sheikh, Egypt	10,000	Hard	(China) Li Yixuan	3–6, 6–3, 6–0
Loss	1–1	May 2018	Kurume Cup, Japan	60,000	Carpet	(Japan) Ayano Shimizu	3–6, 5–7
Loss	1–2	Sep 2019	Darwin International, Australia	60,000	Hard	(Australia) Lizette Cabrera	4–6, 6–4, 2–6

=== Doubles: 25 (17 titles, 8 runner-ups) ===
Legend $50,000 tournaments $25,000 tournaments $15,000 tournaments $10,000 tournaments	Finals by surface Hard (12–7) Clay (2–0) Grass (1–0) Carpet (2–1)

Result	W–L	Date	Tournament	Tier	Surface	Partner	Opponents	Score
Win	1–0	Apr 2012	ITF Manama, Bahrain	10,000	Hard	(Russia) Anna Tyulpa	(Russia) Yana Sizikova (Germany) Anna Zaja	6–3, 3–6, [13–11]
Win	2–0	Jun 2012	ITF Trabzon, Turkey	10,000	Hard	(Russia) Margarita Lazareva	(Turkey) Sultan Gönen (Turkey) Büşra Kayrun	6–2, 6–3
Loss	2–1	Jun 2012	ITF Ağrı, Turkey	10,000	Carpet	(Russia) Yana Sizikova	(Russia) Alexandra Romanova (Slovakia) Chantal Škamlová	3–6, 6–4, [7–10]
Win	3–1	Jun 2012	ITF Istanbul, Turkey	10,000	Hard	(Brazil) Beatriz Maria Martins	(Russia) Diana Isaeva (Russia) Ksenia Kirillova	6–1, 7–6^{(7)}
Loss	3–2	Jul 2012	ITF İzmir, Turkey	10,000	Hard	(Turkey) Melis Sezer	(Romania) Ana Bogdan (Serbia) Teodora Mirčić	3–6, 0–3 ret.
Win	4–2	Nov 2012	ITF Heraklion, Greece	10,000	Carpet	(Turkey) Başak Eraydın	(Bulgaria) Borislava Botusharova (Bulgaria) Vivian Zlatanova	6–0, 6–1
Win	5–2	Nov 2012	ITF Heraklion	10,000	Carpet	(Turkey) Başak Eraydın	(Serbia) Tamara Čurović (Russia) Yana Sizikova	6–4, 6–4
Loss	5–3	Mar 2013	ITF Antalya, Turkey	10,000	Hard	(Turkey) Başak Eraydın	(Georgia (country)) Oksana Kalashnikova (Kyrgyzstan) Ksenia Palkina	4–6, 6–4, [8–10]
Loss	5–4	Jun 2013	ITF Istanbul	10,000	Hard	(Australia) Nicole Hoyanski	(Japan) Mana Ayukawa (Japan) Tomoko Dokei	4–6, 6–7^{(6)}
Win	6–4	Dec 2013	ITF Hong Kong	10,000	Hard	(Australia) Ellen Perez	(Chinese Taipei) Chuang Chia-jung (Chinese Taipei) Lee Ya-hsuan	4–6, 6–3, [10–8]
Loss	6–5	Aug 2014	ITF Sharm El Sheikh, Egypt	10,000	Hard	(Australia) Georgiana Ruhrig	(United Kingdom) Harriet Dart (Russia) Anna Morgina	2–6, 1–6
Win	7–5	Aug 2014	ITF Sharm El Sheikh, Egypt	10,000	Hard	(New Zealand) Claudia Williams	(Belgium) Britt Geukens (Italy) Jasmin Ladurner	6–0, 4–6, [10–5]
Win	8–5	Oct 2014	ITF Cairns, Australia	15,000	Hard	(Australia) Jessica Moore	(Japan) Ayaka Okuno (Australia) Alison Bai	6–2, 6–2
Win	9–5	Oct 2014	ITF Toowoomba, Australia	15,000	Hard	(Australia) Jessica Moore	(Australia) Lizette Cabrera (Australia) Priscilla Hon	6–3, 6–3
Loss	9–6	Oct 2014	ITF Perth, Australia	25,000	Hard	(Australia) Jessica Moore	(Ukraine) Veronika Kapshay (France) Alizé Lim	2–6, 6–2, [7–10]
Win	10–6	Nov 2014	Bendigo International, Australia	50,000	Hard	(Australia) Jessica Moore	(Australia) Naiktha Bains (Australia) Karolina Wlodarczak	6–4, 6–0
Win	11–6	Nov 2014	Bendigo International, Australia	50,000	Hard	(Australia) Jessica Moore	(Thailand) Varatchaya Wongteanchai (Thailand) Varunya Wongteanchai	3–6, 6–1, [10–6]
Win	12–6	Mar 2015	ITF Port Pirie, Australia	15,000	Hard	(Australia) Jessica Moore	(China) Liu Chang (China) Tian Ran	6–0, 6–3
Loss	12–7	Feb 2016	ITF Perth, Australia	25,000	Hard	(Australia) Alison Bai	(Australia) Ashleigh Barty (Australia) Jessica Moore	6–3, 4–6, [8–10]
Win	13–7	Apr 2016	ITF Manisa, Turkey	10,000	Clay	(Turkey) Melis Sezer	(Greece) Eleni Daniilidou (Russia) Margarita Lazareva	6–4, 6–4
Win	14–7	Jul 2016	ITF Saint-Gervais, France	10,000	Clay	(Australia) Ellen Perez	(Oman) Fatma Al-Nabhani (France) Estelle Cascino	7–6^{(5)}, 6–2
Loss	14–8	Sep 2016	ITF Tweed Heads, Australia	25,000	Hard	(Australia) Naiktha Bains	(Australia) Monique Adamczak (Australia) Olivia Rogowska	6–7^{(6)}, 6–7^{(3)}
Win	15–8	Sep 2019	ITF Cairns, Australia	25,000	Hard	(New Zealand) Emily Fanning	(Australia) Maddison Inglis (United States) Asia Muhammad	2–6, 7–6^{(2)}, [10–7]
Win	16–8	Oct 2019	ITF Toowoomba, Australia	25,000	Hard	(Australia) Belinda Woolcock	(Japan) Haruna Arakawa (Australia) Misaki Matsuda	7–6^{(2)}, 6–3
Win	17–8	Mar 2020	ITF Mildura, Australia	25,000	Grass	(Slovakia) Tereza Mihalíková	(Australia) Arina Rodionova (New Zealand) Erin Routliffe	6–3, 6–2
