= 2019 Australian Open – Main draw wildcard entries =

- Date: November 2018 – January 2019
- Edition: 107th
- Category: Grand Slam (ITF)
- Location: (various) United States; Zhuhai, China; Melbourne, Australia
- Australian Open – Main draw wildcard entries

The 2019 Australian Open wildcard playoffs and entries are a group of events and internal selections to choose the eight men and eight women singles wildcard entries for the 2019 Australian Open, as well as seven male and seven female doubles teams plus eight mixed-doubles teams.

== Wildcard entries ==
=== Men's singles ===
| Country | Name | Method of Qualification |
|---|---|---|
| USA | Jack Sock | American Wildcard Challenge |
| CHN | Li Zhe | Asia-Pacific Wildcard Playoff |
| FRA | Jo-Wilfried Tsonga | French internal selection |
| AUS | James Duckworth | Australian Wildcard Playoff |
| AUS | Jason Kubler | Australian internal selection |
| AUS | Alex Bolt | Australian internal selection |
| AUS | Marc Polmans | Australian internal selection |
| AUS | Alexei Popyrin | Australian internal selection |

=== Women's singles ===
| Country | Name | Method of Qualification |
|---|---|---|
| USA | Whitney Osuigwe | American Wildcard Challenge |
| CHN | Peng Shuai | Asia-Pacific Wildcard Playoff |
| FRA | Clara Burel | French internal selection |
| AUS | Priscilla Hon | Australian Wildcard Challenge |
| AUS | Kimberly Birrell | Australian Wildcard Playoff |
| AUS | Ellen Perez | Australian internal selection |
| AUS | Destanee Aiava | Australian internal selection |
| AUS | Zoe Hives | Australian internal selection |

=== Men's doubles ===
| Country | Name | Method of Qualification |
|---|---|---|
| CHN; CHN | Gong Maoxin; Zhang Ze | Asia-Pacific Wildcard Playoff |
| AUS; AUS | Alex Bolt; Marc Polmans | Australian internal selection |
| AUS; AUS | James Duckworth; Jordan Thompson | Australian internal selection |
| AUS; AUS | Blake Ellis; Alexei Popyrin | Australian internal selection |
| AUS; AUS | Lleyton Hewitt; John-Patrick Smith | Australian internal selection |
| AUS; AUS | Nick Kyrgios; Matt Reid | Australian internal selection |
| AUS; AUS | Max Purcell; Luke Saville | Australian internal selection |

=== Women's doubles ===
| Country | Name | Method of Qualification |
|---|---|---|
| TPE; TPE | Chang Kai-chen; Hsu Ching-wen | Asia-Pacific Wildcard Playoff |
| AUS; AUS | Destanee Aiava; Naiktha Bains | Australian Wildcard Playoff |
| AUS; AUS | Ellen Perez; Arina Rodionova | Australian Wildcard Challenge |
| AUS; AUS | Alison Bai; Zoe Hives | Australian internal selection |
| AUS; AUS | Kimberly Birrell; Priscilla Hon | Australian internal selection |
| AUS; AUS | Lizette Cabrera; Jaimee Fourlis | Australian internal selection |
| AUS; AUS | Astra Sharma; Isabelle Wallace | Australian internal selection |

=== Mixed doubles ===
| Country | Name | Method of Qualification |
|---|---|---|
| AUS; AUS | Monique Adamczak; Matt Reid | Australian internal selection |
| AUS; AUS | Priscilla Hon; Alexei Popyrin | Australian internal selection |
| AUS; AUS | Maddison Inglis; Jason Kubler | Australian internal selection |
| AUS; AUS | Jessica Moore; Andrew Whittington | Australian internal selection |
| AUS; AUS | Astra Sharma; John-Patrick Smith | Australian internal selection |
| AUS; IND | Samantha Stosur; Leander Paes | Australian internal selection |
| POL; POL | Iga Świątek; Łukasz Kubot | Australian internal selection |
| CHN; AUS | Zhang Shuai; John Peers | Australian internal selection |

== American Wildcard Challenge ==
The USTA awarded a wildcard to the man and woman that earned the most ranking points across a group of three ATP/Challenger hardcourt events in the October and November 2018. For the men, the events included ATP Paris, $75K Canberra, $75K Charlottesville, $75K+H Shenzhen, €106K+H Bratislava, €85K+H Mouilleron-le-Captif, $150K+H Bangalore, $150K+H Houston, $75K Champaign and $50K+H Kobe events. For the women, the events included $80K Macon, $80K Tyler and $80K Las Vegas and $150K+H Houston. For men, only the best two results from the three weeks of events were taken into account. While for women only the best three results from the four weeks of events were taken into account. The winners of the wildcard challenge were Jack Sock and Whitney Osuigwe.

=== Men's standings ===
| Place | Player | ATP Paris Canberra Charlottesville Shenzhen | Bratislava Mouilleron-le-Captif Knoxville | Bangalore Houston Champaign Kobe | Best Two Results |
|---|---|---|---|---|---|
| 1 | Jack Sock | 180 | — | — | 180 |
| 2 | Reilly Opelka | — | 80 | 80 | 160 |
| 3 | Bradley Klahn | 29 | ~~7~~ | 125 | 154 |
| 4 | Tommy Paul | 80 | — | 29 | 109 |
| 5 | Roy Smith | — | — | 75 | 75 |

=== Women's standings ===
| Place | Player | Macon | Tyler | Las Vegas | Houston | Best Three Results |
|---|---|---|---|---|---|---|
| 1 | Whitney Osuigwe | 10 | 115 | — | 35 | 160 |
| 2 | Varvara Lepchenko | 115 | 10 | ~~1~~ | 15 | 140 |
| 3 | Lauren Davis | 10 | 21 | ~~10~~ | 95 | 126 |
| 4 | Nicole Gibbs | ~~1~~ | 10 | 70 | 15 | 95 |
| 5 | Danielle Lao | 21 | 42 | 21 | — | 84 |

== Australian Women's Wildcard Challenge ==
Tennis Australia awarded a singles wildcard and a doubles wildcard to the Australian women that earned the most ranking points across a group of two ITF hardcourt events in the October and November 2018. The events included the 2018 Bendigo Women's International and the 2018 Canberra Tennis International. The winner of the wildcards were Priscilla Hon, and Ellen Perez and Arina Rodionova.

=== Singles standings ===
| Place | Player | Bendigo | Canberra | Total Points |
|---|---|---|---|---|
| 1 | Priscilla Hon | 80 | 8 | 88 |
| 2 | Zoe Hives | 1 | 80 | 81 |
| 3 | Olivia Rogowska | 15 | 48 | 63 |
| 4 | Ellen Perez | 48 | 8 | 56 |
| 5 | Astra Sharma | 15 | 29 | 44 |

=== Doubles standings ===
| Place | Player | Bendigo | Canberra | Total Points |
|---|---|---|---|---|
| 1 | Ellen Perez; Arina Rodionova | 80 | 80 | 160 |
| 2 | Destanee Aiava; Naiktha Bains | 29 | 48 | 77 |
| 3 | Lizette Cabrera; Jaimee Fourlis | 15 | 29 | 44 |
| 4 | Alison Bai; Zoe Hives | 29 | 1 | 30 |
| 5 | Priscilla Hon; Olivia Rogowska | 0 | 29 | 29 |

== Asia-Pacific Wildcard Playoff ==
The Asia-Pacific Australian Open Wildcard Play-off featured 16-players in the men's and women's singles draws and took place from 26 November to 2 December 2018 at Hengqin International Tennis Centre in Zhuhai, China.

=== Men's singles ===
==== Seeds ====
1. (South Korea) Lee Duck-hee (semifinals)
2. (China) Zhang Ze (final)
3. (China) Li Zhe (winner)
4. (Chinese Taipei) Yang Tsung-hua (first round)
5. (South Korea) Chung Yun-seong (quarterfinals)
6. (Japan) Kaichi Uchida (semifinals)
7. (Japan) Renta Tokuda (quarterfinals)
8. (China) Wu Di (first round)

==== Draw ====
First round
1 | (South Korea) D-h Lee | 6 | 6
(China) Liu Hanyi | 1 | 2
(India) A Kadhe | 6^{3} | 1
7 | (Japan) Renta Tokuda | 7^{7} | 6
3 | (China) Z Li | 7^{8} | 6
WC | (China) Cui Jie | 6^{6} | 1
WC | (China) R Te | 6^{1} | 1
5 | (South Korea) Y-s Chung | 7^{7} | 6
6 | (Japan) K Uchida | 7^{7} | 5 | 7^{8}
(Chinese Taipei) T-l Wu | 6^{4} | 7 | 6^{6}
(Chinese Taipei) Y-h Hsu | 6 | 6
4 | (Chinese Taipei) T-h Yang | 3 | 1
8 | (China) D Wu | 2 | 3
WC | (Northern Mariana Islands) C Sinclair | 6 | 6
(India) Sidharth Rawat | 4 | 2
2 | (China) Ze Zhang | 6 | 6

Quarterfinals
1 | (South Korea) D-h Lee | 6 | 6
7 | (Japan) R Tokuda | 4 | 4
3 | (China) Z Li | 6 | 6
5 | (South Korea) Y-s Chung | 4 | 4
6 | (Japan) K Uchida | 6 | 6
(Chinese Taipei) Y-h Hsu | 2 | 2
WC | (Northern Mariana Islands) C Sinclair | 1 | 1
2 | (China) Ze Zhang | 6 | 6

Semifinals
1 | (South Korea) D-h Lee | 6^{5} | 3
3 | (China) Z Li | 7^{7} | 6
6 | (Japan) K Uchida | 4 | 1
2 | (China) Ze Zhang | 6 | 6

Final
3 | (China) Z Li | 1 | 7^{7} | 6
2 | (China) Ze Zhang | 6 | 6^{2} | 4

=== Women's singles ===
==== Seeds ====
1. (China) Peng Shuai (winner)
2. (South Korea) Jang Su-jeong (quarterfinals)
3. (China) Xun Fangying (first round)
4. (Thailand) Peangtarn Plipuech (first round)
5. (Japan) Mai Minokoshi (first round)
6. (Japan) Hiroko Kuwata (first round)
7. (India) Pranjala Yadlapalli (quarterfinals)
8. (China) Wang Xinyu (first round)

==== Draw ====
First round
1 | (China) S Peng | 6 | 7
(Japan) M Imanishi | 0 | 5
WC | (Papua New Guinea) A Tere-Apisah | 4 | 6 | 7
6 | (Japan) H Kuwata | 6 | 4 | 5
4 | (Thailand) P Plipuech | 3 | 4
WC | (China) X You | 6 | 6
WC | (China) Gai Ao | 6 | 7^{7}
5 | (Japan) Mai Minokoshi | 2 | 6^{3}
7 | (India) P Yadlapalli | 6 | 2 | 7^{7}
Q | (Japan) Mana Ayukawa | 2 | 6 | 6^{3}
Q | (Japan) C Muramatsu | 6 | 6
3 | (China) F Xun | 3 | 3
8 | (China) Xin Wang | 7 | 4 | 1
Q | (Chinese Taipei) K-c Chang | 5 | 6 | 6
Q | (Japan) M Hontama | 1 | 2
2 | (South Korea) S-j Jang | 6 | 6

Quarterfinals
1 | (China) S Peng | 6 | 5 | 6
WC | (Papua New Guinea) A Tere-Apisah | 3 | 7 | 0
WC | (China) X You | 4
WC | (China) A Gai | 3^{r}
7 | (India) P Yadlapalli | 2 | 5
Q | (Japan) C Muramatsu | 6 | 7
Q | (Chinese Taipei) K-c Chang | 3 | 7 | 7
2 | (South Korea) S-j Jang | 6 | 5 | 5

Semifinals
1 | (China) S Peng | 6 | 6
WC | (China) X You | 2 | 2
Q | (Japan) C Muramatsu | 3 | 3
Q | (Chinese Taipei) K-c Chang | 6 | 6

Final
1 | (China) S Peng | 6 | 1
Q | (Chinese Taipei) K-c Chang | 2 | 0^{r}

=== Men's doubles ===
==== Seeds ====
1. (China) Gong Maoxin / (China) Zhang Ze (winners)
2. (Chinese Taipei) Hsieh Cheng-peng / (Chinese Taipei) Yang Tsung-hua (quarterfinals)
3. (India) Sriram Balaji / (India) Arjun Kadhe (semifinals)
4. (Japan) Toshihide Matsui / (Japan) Kaito Uesugi (final)

==== Draw ====
First round
(China) Zheng Baoluo (China) Zhou Xinmu | 3 | 0
(Chinese Taipei) Y-h Hsu (Chinese Taipei) T-l Wu | 6 | 6
(Chinese Taipei) H-y Peng (Chinese Taipei) J Wang | 6 | 6
(Northern Mariana Islands) C Sinclair (Hong Kong) P-l Yeung | 2 | 3

Quarterfinals
1 | (China) M Gong (China) Ze Zhang | 7 | 6
(Chinese Taipei) Y-h Hsu (Chinese Taipei) T-l Wu | 5 | 4
3 | (India) S Balaji (India) A Kadhe | 6 | 4 | [16]
(China) R Te (China) D Wu | 1 | 6 | [14]
(China) Cui Jie (China) Liu Hanyi | 4 | 2
4 | (Japan) T Matsui (Japan) K Uesugi | 6 | 6
(Chinese Taipei) H-y Peng (Chinese Taipei) J Wang | 6 | 4 | [10]
2 | (Chinese Taipei) C-p Hsieh (Chinese Taipei) T-h Yang | 4 | 6 | [7]

Semifinals
1 | (China) M Gong (China) Ze Zhang | 6 | 6
3 | (India) S Balaji (India) A Kadhe | 4 | 2
4 | (Japan) T Matsui (Japan) K Uesugi | 6 | 2 | [11]
(Chinese Taipei) H-y Peng (Chinese Taipei) J Wang | 0 | 6 | [9]

Final
1 | (China) M Gong (China) Ze Zhang | 6 | 6
4 | (Japan) T Matsui (Japan) K Uesugi | 1 | 2

=== Women's doubles ===
==== Seeds ====
1. (China) Jiang Xinyu / (China) Tang Qianhui (semifinals)
2. (Japan) Rika Fujiwara / (Chinese Taipei) Hsieh Shu-ying (quarterfinals)
3. (Thailand) Peangtarn Plipuech / (China) Ye Qiuyu (quarterfinals)
4. (China) Xun Fangying / (China) You Xiaodi (quarterfinals)

==== Draw ====
First round
(Chinese Taipei) P-h Chen (Chinese Taipei) F-h Wu | 4 | 6^{4}
(Japan) Robu Kajitani (Japan) H Kuwata | 6 | 7^{7}
(China) X Sun (China) Zhao Qianqian | 1 | 4
(Chinese Taipei) K-c Chang (Chinese Taipei) C-w Hsu | 6 | 6
(China) Cao Yajing (China) Zhao Xichen | 2 | 2
(Japan) E Hayashi (Japan) M Imanishi | 6 | 6
(China) S Feng (China) J Kang | 6^{2} | 1
(Japan) E Sema (Papua New Guinea) A Tere-Apisah | 7^{7} | 6

Quarterfinals
1 | (China) X Jiang (China) Q Tang | 6 | 6
(Japan) R Kajitani (Japan) H Kuwata | 4 | 4
4 | (China) F Xun (China) X You | 5 | 6^{4}
(Chinese Taipei) K-c Chang (Chinese Taipei) C-w Hsu | 7 | 7^{7}
(Japan) E Hayashi (Japan) M Imanishi | 6 | 6
3 | (Thailand) P Plipuech (China) Q Ye | 3 | 3
(Japan) E Sema (Papua New Guinea) A Tere-Apisah | 6 | 6
2 | (Japan) R Fujiwara (Chinese Taipei) S-y Hsieh | 4 | 3

Semifinals
1 | (China) X Jiang (China) Q Tang | 2 | 6 | [8]
(Chinese Taipei) K-c Chang (Chinese Taipei) C-w Hsu | 6 | 2 | [10]
(Japan) E Hayashi (Japan) M Imanishi | 3 | 6 | [10]
(Japan) E Sema (Papua New Guinea) A Tere-Apisah | 6 | 3 | [7]

Final
(Chinese Taipei) K-c Chang (Chinese Taipei) C-w Hsu | 6 | 1 | [12]
(Japan) E Hayashi (Japan) M Imanishi | 2 | 6 | [10]

== Australian Wildcard Playoff ==
The December Showdown is held annually for two weeks in December. The Showdown includes age championships for 12/u, 14/u, 16/u and 18/u age categories. It also hosts the 2019 Australian Wildcard Playoff which will be held from 10 to 16 December 2018 at Melbourne Park, offering a main draw singles wildcard for men and women and a main draw women's doubles wildcard.

=== Men's singles ===
==== Seeds ====
1. (Australia) Alex Bolt (semifinals)
2. (Australia) John-Patrick Smith (quarterfinals)
3. (Australia) James Duckworth (winner)
4. (Australia) Max Purcell (first round)
5. (Australia) Akira Santillan (quarterfinals)
6. (Australia) Maverick Banes (semifinals)
7. (Australia) Bradley Mousley (first round)
8. (Australia) Andrew Harris (first round)

==== Draw ====
First round
1 | (Australia) A Bolt | 6 | 6 | 7^{7}
WC | (Australia) A Vukic | 3 | 4 | 6^{5}
(Australia) Jacob Grills | 1 | 5 | 4
5 | (Australia) A Santillan | 6 | 7 | 6
4 | (Australia) M Purcell | 6 | 1 | 4 | 3
(Australia) D Kelly | 4 | 6 | 6 | 6
WC | (Australia) L Saville | 6 | 6 | 6
7 | (Australia) B Mousley | 3 | 4 | 4
8 | (Australia) A Harris | 7^{8} | 2 | 5 | 7^{8} | 3
WC | (Australia) R Hijikata | 6^{6} | 6 | 7 | 6^{6} | 6
(Australia) B Ellis | 7 | 4 | 5 | 2
3 | (Australia) J Duckworth | 5 | 6 | 7 | 6
6 | (Australia) M Banes | 6 | 7^{7} | 6
WC | (Australia) C O'Connell | 4 | 6^{3} | 0
(Australia) J Beale | 2 | 5 | 7 | 3
2 | (Australia) J-P Smith | 6 | 7 | 5 | 6

Quarterfinals
1 | (Australia) A Bolt | 6 | 6^{6} | 6 | 6
5 | (Australia) A Santillan | 2 | 7^{8} | 2 | 0
(Australia) D Kelly | 5 | 6 | 2 | 6^{3}
WC | (Australia) L Saville | 7 | 3 | 6 | 7^{7}
WC | (Australia) R Hijikata | 3 | 4 | 6 | 3
3 | (Australia) J Duckworth | 6 | 6 | 3 | 6
6 | (Australia) M Banes | 6 | 6^{3} | 1 | 6 | 6
2 | (Australia) J-P Smith | 4 | 7^{7} | 6 | 0 | 2

Semifinals
1 | (Australia) A Bolt | 2 | 4 | 1
WC | (Australia) L Saville | 6 | 6 | 6
3 | (Australia) J Duckworth | 6^{4} | 7 | 6 | 6
6 | (Australia) M Banes | 7^{7} | 5 | 1 | 3

Final
WC | (Australia) L Saville | 3 | 7 | 5 | 6^{2}
3 | (Australia) J Duckworth | 6 | 5 | 7 | 7^{7}

=== Women's singles ===
==== Seeds ====
1. (Australia) Arina Rodionova (quarterfinals)
2. (Australia) Ellen Perez (semifinals)
3. (Australia) Jaimee Fourlis (quarterfinals)
4. (Australia) Zoe Hives (semifinals)
5. (Australia) Astra Sharma (final)
6. (Australia) Lizette Cabrera (first round)
7. (Australia) Destanee Aiava (first round)
8. (Australia) Kimberly Birrell (winner)

==== Draw ====
First round
1 | (Australia) Ar Rodionova | 6 | 1
WC | (Australia) O Tjandramulia | 1 | 0^{r}
(Australia) I Wallace | 6 | 1 | 4
5 | (Australia) A Sharma | 3 | 6 | 6
4 | (Australia) Z Hives | 6 | 6
(Australia) N Bains | 4 | 3
(Australia) K McPhee | 6 | 6
6 | (Australia) L Cabrera | 2 | 4
8 | (Australia) K Birrell | 7 | 6
WC | (Australia) G Da Silva-Fick | 5 | 1
WC | (Australia) M Inglis | 4 | 6^{6}
3 | (Australia) J Fourlis | 6 | 7^{8}
7 | (Australia) D Aiava | 4 | 4
(Australia) A Myers | 6 | 6
WC | (Australia) A Bozovic | 7 | 1 | 4
2 | (Australia) E Perez | 5 | 6 | 6

Quarterfinals
1 | (Australia) Ar Rodionova | 1 | 1
5 | (Australia) A Sharma | 6 | 6
4 | (Australia) Z Hives | 6 | 6
(Australia) K McPhee | 2 | 0
8 | (Australia) K Birrell | 6 | 7^{7}
3 | (Australia) J Fourlis | 4 | 6^{4}
(Australia) A Myers | 4 | 7^{7} | 3
2 | (Australia) E Perez | 6 | 6^{1} | 6

Semifinals
5 | (Australia) A Sharma | 3 | 6 | 6
4 | (Australia) Z Hives | 6 | 4 | 3
8 | (Australia) K Birrell | 6 | 6
2 | (Australia) E Perez | 4 | 4

Final
5 | (Australia) A Sharma | 4 | 2
8 | (Australia) K Birrell | 6 | 6

=== Women's doubles ===
==== Seeds ====
1. (Australia) Destanee Aiava / (Australia) Naiktha Bains (winners)
2. (Australia) Lizette Cabrera / (Australia) Jaimee Fourlis (semifinals)
3. (Australia) Alison Bai / (Australia) Zoe Hives (semifinals)
4. (Australia) Olivia Tjandramulia / (Australia) Belinda Woolcock (first round)

==== Draw ====
First round
1 | (Australia) D Aiava (Australia) N Bains | 6 | 6
(Australia) M Inglis (Australia) K McPhee | 3 | 1
WC | (Australia) A Marshall (Australia) A Poulos | 3 | 5
3 | (Australia) A Bai (Australia) Z Hives | 6 | 7
4 | (Australia) O Tjandramulia (Australia) B Woolcock | 4 | 3
(Australia) A Sharma (Australia) I Wallace | 6 | 6
WC | (Australia) A Bozovic (Australia) S Mendez | 4 | 2
2 | (Australia) L Cabrera (Australia) J Fourlis | 6 | 6

Semifinals
1 | (Australia) D Aiava (Australia) N Bains | 3 | 6 | [10]
3 | (Australia) A Bai (Australia) Z Hives | 6 | 1 | [4]
(Australia) A Sharma (Australia) I Wallace | 6 | 4 | [12]
2 | (Australia) L Cabrera (Australia) J Fourlis | 4 | 6 | [10]

Final
1 | (Australia) D Aiava (Australia) N Bains | 6 | 6
(Australia) A Sharma (Australia) I Wallace | 2 | 3
