= 2018 Australian Open – Main draw wildcard entries =

- Date: November 2017 – January 2018
- Edition: 106th
- Category: Grand Slam (ITF)
- Location: (various) United States; Zhuhai, Guangdong, China; Melbourne, Victoria, Australia
- Australian Open – Main draw wildcard entries

The 2018 Australian Open wildcard playoffs and entries are a group of events and internal selections to choose the eight men and eight women singles wildcard entries for the 2018 Australian Open, as well as seven male and seven female doubles teams plus eight mixed-doubles teams.

== Wildcard entries ==
=== Men's singles ===
Country	Name	Method of Qualification
USA	Tim Smyczek	American Wildcard Challenge
KOR	Kwon Soon-woo	Asia-Pacific Wildcard Playoff
FRA	Corentin Moutet	French internal selection
AUS	Alex De Minaur	Australian Wildcard Playoff
AUS	Thanasi Kokkinakis	Australian internal selection
AUS	Alex Bolt	Australian internal selection
AUS	Jason Kubler	Australian internal selection
AUS	Alexei Popyrin	Australian internal selection

=== Women's singles ===
Country	Name	Method of Qualification
USA	Kristie Ahn (Note: Taylor Townsend was the original winner for the US Wildcard Playoff Challenge. When she was directly entered into the main draw, Townsend was ineligible to place the Wildcard entry and therefore it was given to the runner-up, Kristie Ahn.)	American Wildcard Challenge
CHN	Wang Xinyu	Asia-Pacific Wildcard Playoff
FRA	Jessika Ponchet	French internal selection
AUS	Destanee Aiava	Australian Wildcard Playoff
AUS	Olivia Rogowska	Australian Wildcard Challenge
AUS	Jaimee Fourlis	Australian 18/U Championships
AUS	Ajla Tomljanović (Note: Victoria Azarenka originally received the Wildcard as she later withdrew due to family reasons, Ajla Tomljanović took her place in the Wildcard spot.)	Australian internal selection
AUS	Lizette Cabrera	Australian internal selection

=== Men's doubles ===
Country	Name	Method of Qualification
THA; THA	Sanchai Ratiwatana; Sonchat Ratiwatana	Asia-Pacific Wildcard Playoff
AUS; AUS	Sam Groth; Lleyton Hewitt	Australian internal selection
AUS; AUS	Alex Bolt; Bradley Mousley	Australian internal selection
AUS; AUS	~~Alex de Minaur~~; ~~James Duckworth~~	Australian internal selection
AUS; AUS	Matthew Ebden; John Millman	Australian internal selection
AUS; AUS	Thanasi Kokkinakis; Jordan Thompson	Australian internal selection
AUS; AUS	Max Purcell; Luke Saville	Australian internal selection

=== Women's doubles ===
Country	Name	Method of Qualification
CHN; CHN	Jiang Xinyu; Tang Qianhui	Asia-Pacific Wildcard Playoff
AUS; AUS	Alison Bai; Zoe Hives	Australian Wildcard Challenge
AUS; AUS	Astra Sharma; Belinda Woolcock	Australian Wildcard Playoff
AUS; AUS	Naiktha Bains; Isabelle Wallace	Australian internal selection
AUS; AUS	Kimberly Birrell; Jaimee Fourlis	Australian internal selection
AUS; AUS	Priscilla Hon; Ajla Tomljanović	Australian internal selection
AUS; AUS	Jessica Moore; Ellen Perez	Australian internal selection

=== Mixed doubles ===
Country	Name	Method of Qualification
AUS; AUS	Monique Adamczak; Matthew Ebden	Australian internal selection
AUS; AUS	Lizette Cabrera; Alex Bolt	Australian internal selection
AUS; AUS	Zoe Hives; Bradley Mousley	Australian internal selection
AUS; AUS	Priscilla Hon; Matt Reid	Australian internal selection
AUS; AUS	Ellen Perez; Andrew Whittington	Australian internal selection
AUS; AUS	Arina Rodionova; John-Patrick Smith	Australian internal selection
AUS; AUS	Storm Sanders; Marc Polmans	Australian internal selection
AUS; AUS	Samantha Stosur; Sam Groth	Australian internal selection

== US Wildcard Challenge ==
The USTA awarded a wildcard to the man and woman that earned the most ranking points across a group of three ATP/Challenger hardcourt events in the October and November 2017. For the men, the events included ATP Paris, $75K Canberra, $75K Charlottesville, $75K+H Shenzhen, €106K+H Bratislava, €85K+H Mouilleron-le-Captif, $50K+H Kobe, $75K Knoxville, $75K Champaign and $50K+H Pune events. For the women, the events included $80K Macon, $80K Tyler and $80K Waco. Only the best two results from the three weeks of challengers were taken into account with the winners being Tim Smyczek and Taylor Townsend.

=== Men's standings ===
Place	Player	ATP Paris Canberra Charlottesville Shenzhen	Bratislava Mouilleron-le-Captif Kobe Knoxville	Champaign Pune	Best Two Results
1	Tim Smyczek	80	~~15~~	80	160
2	Denis Kudla	15	48	—	63
2	Tennys Sandgren	48	—	15	63
2	Bjorn Fratangelo	~~7~~	15	48	63
5	Taylor Fritz	—	15	29	44

=== Women's standings ===
Place	Player	Macon	Tyler	Waco	Best Two Results
~~1~~	~~Taylor Townsend~~	~~1~~	~~21~~	~~115~~	~~136~~
2	Kristie Ahn	1	115	~~1~~	116
3	Sofia Kenin	~~1~~	42	42	84
4	Victoria Duval	70	10	~~1~~	80
4	Danielle Collins	10	70	—	80

== Australian Women's Wildcard Challenge ==
Tennis Australia awarded a singles wildcard and a doubles wildcard to the Australian women that earned the most ranking points across a group of two ITF hardcourt events in the October and November 2017. The events included the 2017 Canberra Tennis International and the 2017 Bendigo Women's International. The winners of the wildcards were Olivia Rogowska, and Alison Bai and Zoe Hives, respectively.

=== Singles standings ===
Place	Player	Canberra	Bendigo	Total Points
1	Olivia Rogowska	80	48	128
2	Destanee Aiava	48	8	56
3	Alison Bai	29	1	30
4	Arina Rodionova	8	15	23
5	Tammi Patterson	1	15	16
5	Sara Tomic	1	15	16
5	Isabelle Wallace	1	15	16

=== Doubles standings ===
Place	Player	Canberra	Bendigo	Total Points
1	Alison Bai; Zoe Hives	1	80	81
2	Jessica Moore; Ellen Perez	48	29	77
3	Genevieve Lorbergs; Isabelle Wallace	15	1	16
3	Astra Sharma; Belinda Woolcock	1	15	16
5	Alexandra Bozovic; Maddison Inglis	1	1	2
5	Tammi Patterson; Olivia Rogowska	1	1	2
5	Gabriella Da Silva-Fick; Storm Sanders	1	1	2

== Asia-Pacific Wildcard Playoff ==
The Asia-Pacific Australian Open Wildcard Play-off featured 16-players in the men's and women's singles draws and took place from 29 November to 3 December 2017 at Hengqin International Tennis Centre in Zhuhai, China.

=== Men's singles ===
==== Seeds ====
1. (South Korea) Kwon Soon-woo (winner)
2. (China) Zhang Ze (quarterfinals, withdrew)
3. (Japan) Yusuke Takahashi (quarterfinals)
4. (China) Li Zhe (final)
5. (Chinese Taipei) Yang Tsung-hua (first round)
6. (India) Sumit Nagal (first round)
7. (China) Zhang Zhizhen (semifinals)
8. (Japan) Hiroki Moriya (semifinals)

==== Draw ====
First round
1	(South Korea) S-w Kwon	7	6
Q	(China) L Zhao	5	1
5	(Chinese Taipei) T-h Yang	4	7	4
Q	(India) V Vardhan	6	5	6
3	(Japan) Y Takahashi	6	6
WC	(China) Xia Zihao	1	1
8	(Japan) H Moriya	7	6
(India) S Balaji	5	0
Q	(Uzbekistan) J Karimov	7	6
6	(India) S Nagal	5	4
Q	(Japan) Yo Watanuki	3	2
4	(China) Z Li	6	6
WC	(China) Wu Hao	4	2
7	(China) Zh Zhang	6	6
WC	(Thailand) W Trongcharoenchaikul	5	4
2	(China) Ze Zhang	7	6

Quarterfinals
1	(South Korea) S-w Kwon	w/o
Q	(India) V Vardhan
3	(Japan) Y Takahashi	6	3	5
8	(Japan) H Moriya	3	6	7
Q	(Uzbekistan) J Karimov	3	1
4	(China) Z Li	6	6
7	(China) Zh Zhang	w/o
2	(China) Ze Zhang

Semifinals
1	(South Korea) S-w Kwon	6	6
8	(Japan) H Moriya	1	1
4	(China) Z Li	4	6	6
7	(China) Zh Zhang	6	4	4

Final
1	(South Korea) S-w Kwon	6	6
4	(China) Z Li	1	1

=== Women's singles ===
==== Seeds ====
1. (Japan) Misaki Doi (semifinals)
2. (China) Lu Jingjing (semifinals)
3. (Japan) Junri Namigata (first round)
4. (Japan) Miharu Imanishi (first round)
5. (China) Gao Xinyu (quarterfinals)
6. (Chinese Taipei) Chang Kai-chen (quarterfinals)
7. (Japan) Ayano Shimizu (first round)
8. (Japan) Hiroko Kuwata (first round)

==== Draw ====
First round
1	(Japan) M Doi	6	7^{7}
Q	(Japan) E Sema	1	6^{3}
6	(Chinese Taipei) K-c Chang	6	6
Q	(Japan) A Omae	3	3
4	(Japan) M Imanishi	2	7	1
WC	(China) Xin Wang	6	5	6
8	(Japan) H Kuwata	7	3	2
Q	(China) X Sun	5	6	6
(Japan) M Inoue	6	6
7	(Japan) A Shimizu	3	2
WC	(Papua New Guinea) A Tere-Apisah	6	6
3	(Japan) J Namigata	2	1
WC	(China) F Xun	5	6	6^{2}
5	(China) X Gao	7	4	7^{7}
(Japan) R Sawayanagi	3^{r}
2	(China) Jin Lu	5

Quarterfinals
1	(Japan) M Doi	6	6
6	(Chinese Taipei) K-c Chang	3	2
WC	(China) Xin Wang	6	6
Q	(China) X Sun	2	1
(Japan) M Inoue	3	4
WC	(Papua New Guinea) A Tere-Apisah	6	6
5	(China) X Gao	0	2
2	(China) Jin Lu	6	6

Semifinals
1	(Japan) M Doi	6	4	3
WC	(China) Xin Wang	1	6	6
WC	(Papua New Guinea) A Tere-Apisah	6	6
2	(China) Jin Lu	1	1

Final
WC	(China) Xin Wang	4	7	6
WC	(Papua New Guinea) A Tere-Apisah	6	5	4

=== Men's doubles ===
==== Seeds ====
1. (Thailand) Sanchai Ratiwatana / (Thailand) Sonchat Ratiwatana (winners)
2. (India) Jeevan Nedunchezhiyan / (Indonesia) Christopher Rungkat (final)
3. (India) Sriram Balaji / (India) Vishnu Vardhan (semifinals)
4. (Japan) Toshihide Matsui / (Chinese Taipei) Yi Chu-huan (semifinals)

==== Draw ====
First round
(Chinese Taipei) C-p Hsieh (Chinese Taipei) T-h Yang	6	6
(Chinese Taipei) H-y Peng (China) Zh Zhang	4	4
(China) M Gong (China) Ze Zhang	6^{1}	6	[10]
(China) Wu Hao (China) Xia Zihao	7^{7}	3	[5]
WC	(China) Du Ye (China) Gao Qun	7^{9}	2	[10]
(South Korea) S-w Kwon (China) Z Li	6^{7}	6	[6]
(Japan) H Moriya (Japan) Y Takahashi	6	6
WC	(China) Zheng Yanjie (China) Zhou Xinmu	0	2

Quarterfinals
1	(Thailand) Sa Ratiwatana (Thailand) So Ratiwatana	6	6
(Chinese Taipei) C-p Hsieh (Chinese Taipei) T-h Yang	4	3
4	(Japan) T Matsui (Chinese Taipei) C-h Yi	4	6	[10]
(China) M Gong (China) Ze Zhang	6	3	[4]
(China) Y Du (China) Q Gao	4	2
3	(India) S Balaji (India) V Vardhan	6	6
(Japan) H Moriya (Japan) Y Takahashi	6	3	[5]
2	(India) J Nedunchezhiyan (Indonesia) C Rungkat	3	6	[10]

Semifinals
1	(Thailand) Sa Ratiwatana (Thailand) So Ratiwatana	7^{9}	6
4	(Japan) T Matsui (Chinese Taipei) C-h Yi	6^{4}	1
3	(India) S Balaji (India) V Vardhan	2	3
2	(India) J Nedunchezhiyan (Indonesia) C Rungkat	6	6

Final
1	(Thailand) Sa Ratiwatana (Thailand) So Ratiwatana	7^{8}	6
2	(India) J Nedunchezhiyan (Indonesia) C Rungkat	6^{6}	3

=== Women's doubles ===
==== Seeds ====
1. (China) Lu Jingjing / (China) Ye Qiuyu (semifinals)
2. (China) Jiang Xinyu / (China) Tang Qianhui (winners)
3. (Chinese Taipei) Chang Kai-chen / (Japan) Hiroko Kuwata (quarterfinals)
4. (Japan) Junri Namigata / (Japan) Riko Sawayanagi (final)

==== Draw ====
First round
WC	(China) Wang Jiaqi (China) Zhou Keyi	3	3
WC	(China) X Sun (China) M Wang	6	6
(China) X Gao (China) F Xun	3	3
(Japan) M Inoue (Japan) K Takahata	6	6
(Japan) M Imanishi (Japan) A Omae	6	7^{7}
WC	(Indonesia) B Gumulya (Indonesia) J Rompies	2	6^{4}
(Japan) E Sema (Papua New Guinea) A Tere-Apisah	6	3	[10]
WC	(Japan) M Kobori (Japan) A Shimizu	4	6	[7]

Quarterfinals
1	(China) Jin Lu (China) Q Ye	4	6	[10]
WC	(China) X Sun (China) M Wang	6	3	[6]
4	(Japan) J Namigata (Japan) R Sawayanagi	6	6
(Japan) M Inoue (Japan) K Takahata	2	4
(Japan) M Imanishi (Japan) A Omae	7	6
3	(Chinese Taipei) K-c Chang (Japan) H Kuwata	5	4
(Japan) E Sema (Papua New Guinea) A Tere-Apisah	3	6	[7]
2	(China) X Jiang (China) Q Tang	6	1	[10]

Semifinals
1	(China) Jin Lu (China) Q Ye	2	6	[4]
4	(Japan) J Namigata (Japan) R Sawayanagi	6	4	[10]
(Japan) M Imanishi (Japan) A Omae	6^{3}	4
2	(China) X Jiang (China) Q Tang	7^{7}	6

Final
4	(Japan) J Namigata (Japan) R Sawayanagi	6	0	[4]
2	(China) X Jiang (China) Q Tang	2	6	[10]

== Australian Wildcard Playoff ==
The December Showdown is held annually for two weeks in December. The Showdown includes age championships for 12/u, 14/u, 16/u and 18/u age categories. It also hosts the 2018 Australian Wildcard Playoff which will be held from 11–17 December 2017 at Melbourne Park, offering a main draw singles wildcard for men and women and a main draw women's doubles wildcard. The winner of the girls' 18/u championship will also be given a main draw wildcard into the 2018 Australian Open.

=== Men's singles ===
==== Seeds ====
1. (Australia) Alex Bolt (final)
2. (Australia) Alex De Minaur (winner)
3. (Australia) Andrew Whittington (quarterfinals)
4. (Australia) Dayne Kelly (withdrew)
5. (Australia) Omar Jasika (semifinals)
6. (Australia) Maverick Banes (first round)
7. (Australia) Bradley Mousley (first round)
8. (Australia) Marc Polmans (semifinals)
9. (Australia) Christopher O'Connell (quarterfinals)

==== Draw ====
First round
1	(Australia) A Bolt	6^{7}	6	6	5	6
WC	(Australia) Benard Nkomba	7^{9}	2	4	7	2
WC	(Australia) Alexander Crnokrak	6	1	6	6
7	(Australia) B Mousley	4	6	3	4
3	(Australia) A Whittington	6^{7}	7^{7}	7^{7}	1	6
WC	(Australia) Gavin van Peperzeel	7^{9}	6^{4}	6^{5}	6	4
(Australia) L Saville	6^{4}	6^{6}	3
8	(Australia) M Polmans	7^{7}	7^{8}	6
5	(Australia) O Jasika	6	6	6
Alt	(Australia) Matthew Dellavedova	4	4	3
WC	(Australia) B Ellis	7^{7}	4	3	4
9	(Australia) C O'Connell	6^{4}	6	6	6
6	(Australia) M Banes	7^{7}	3	3	6^{4}
Alt	(Australia) M Barton	6^{4}	6	6	7^{7}
(Australia) H Bourchier	2	0	1
2	(Australia) A De Minaur	6	6	6

Quarterfinals
1	(Australia) A Bolt	6	6	6
WC	(Australia) A Crnokrak	1	3	3
3	(Australia) A Whittington	6^{2}	4	6	2
8	(Australia) M Polmans	7^{7}	6	4	6
5	(Australia) O Jasika	7^{7}	3	6	4	6
9	(Australia) C O'Connell	6^{2}	6	1	6	4
Alt	(Australia) M Barton	2	1	2
2	(Australia) A De Minaur	6	6	6

Semifinals
1	(Australia) A Bolt	7^{7}	6	7^{7}
8	(Australia) M Polmans	6^{3}	4	6^{4}
5	(Australia) O Jasika	6	1	2	0
2	(Australia) A De Minaur	3	6	6	6

Final
1	(Australia) A Bolt	2	4	7^{7}	1
2	(Australia) A De Minaur	6	6	6^{1}	6

=== Women's singles ===
==== Seeds ====
1. (Australia) Arina Rodionova (semifinals)
2. (Australia) Destanee Aiava (winner)
3. (Australia) Tammi Patterson (final)
4. (Australia) Kimberly Birrell (semifinals)
5. (Australia) Naiktha Bains (quarterfinals)
6. (Australia) Zoe Hives (quarterfinals)
7. (Australia) Anastasia Rodionova (first round)
8. (Australia) Olivia Tjandramulia (quarterfinals)

==== Draw ====
First round
1	(Australia) Ar Rodionova	7^{7}	6
(Australia) S Tomic	6^{2}	4
(Australia) A Bai	5	6	6
8	(Australia) O Tjandramulia	7	4	8
3	(Australia) T Patterson	4	6	6
(Australia) M Haet	6	0	0
WC	(Australia) B Woolcock	1	7^{7}	3
5	(Australia) N Bains	6	6^{3}	6
7	(Australia) An Rodionova	3	3
WC	(Australia) A Bozovic	6	6
WC	(Australia) M Inglis	4	6	2
4	(Australia) K Birrell	6	4	6
6	(Australia) Z Hives	6	6
(Australia) A Sharma	3	4
WC	(Australia) M Jovanovic	6	3	2
2	(Australia) D Aiava	4	6	6

Quarterfinals
1	(Australia) Ar Rodionova	6	0	6
8	(Australia) O Tjandramulia	3	6	4
3	(Australia) T Patterson	6	4	6
5	(Australia) N Bains	3	6	4
WC	(Australia) A Bozovic	4	1
4	(Australia) K Birrell	6	6
6	(Australia) Z Hives	2	7	0
2	(Australia) D Aiava	6	5	6

Semifinals
1	(Australia) Ar Rodionova	6	3	5
3	(Australia) T Patterson	4	6	7
4	(Australia) K Birrell	4	1
2	(Australia) D Aiava	6	6

Final
3	(Australia) T Patterson	4	0
2	(Australia) D Aiava	6	6

=== Women's doubles ===
==== Seeds ====
1. (Australia) Jessica Moore / (Australia) Ellen Perez (semifinals)
2. (Australia) Destanee Aiava / (Australia) Tammi Patterson (final)
3. (Australia) Naiktha Bains / (Australia) Sara Tomic (first round)
4. (Australia) Astra Sharma / (Australia) Belinda Woolcock (winners)

==== Draw ====
First round
1	(Australia) Jessica Moore (Australia) Ellen Perez	6	6
(Australia) Masa Jovanovic (Australia) Alexandra Walters	3	4
4	(Australia) Astra Sharma (Australia) Belinda Woolcock	6	6
WC	(Australia) Olivia Gadecki (Australia) Kaitlin Staines	4	3
(Australia) Kimberly Birrell (Australia) Jaimee Fourlis	6	7
3	(Australia) Naiktha Bains (Australia) Sara Tomic	2	5
WC	(Australia) Alexandra Bozovic (Australia) Maddison Inglis	2	4
2	(Australia) Destanee Aiava (Australia) Tammi Patterson	6	6

Semifinals
1	(Australia) Jessica Moore (Australia) Ellen Perez	5	6	[7]
4	(Australia) Astra Sharma (Australia) Belinda Woolcock	7	4	[10]
(Australia) Kimberly Birrell (Australia) Jaimee Fourlis	4	4
2	(Australia) Destanee Aiava (Australia) Tammi Patterson	6	6

Final
4	(Australia) Astra Sharma (Australia) Belinda Woolcock	6	3	[10]
2	(Australia) Destanee Aiava (Australia) Tammi Patterson	1	6	[3]

=== Girls' singles ===
==== Seeds ====
1. (Australia) Destanee Aiava (final)
2. (Australia) Jaimee Fourlis (winner)
3. (Australia) Alexandra Bozovic (semifinals)
4. (Australia) Gabriella Da Silva-Fick (quarterfinals)
5. (Australia) Renee McBryde (quarterfinals)
6. (Australia) Aleksa Cveticanin (round robin)
7. (Australia) Laura Ashley (round robin)
8. (Australia) Ivana Popovic (round robin)

==== Draw ====
Quarterfinals
1	(Australia) Destanee Aiava	6	6
5	(Australia) Renee McBryde	2	3
(Australia) Amber Marshall	1	6	6
4	(Australia) Gabriella Da Silva-Fick	6	3	2
3	(Australia) Alexandra Bozovic	6	6
Q	(Australia) Helena Spiridis	3	4
(Australia) Olivia Gadecki	2	2
2	(Australia) Jaimee Fourlis	6	6

Semifinals
1	(Australia) Destanee Aiava	6	6
(Australia) Amber Marshall	1	1
3	(Australia) Alexandra Bozovic	2	3
2	(Australia) Jaimee Fourlis	6	6

Final
1	(Australia) Destanee Aiava	7^{7}	6^{1}	5
2	(Australia) Jaimee Fourlis	6^{4}	7^{7}	7
