= 2018 Bendigo Women's International – Doubles =

Doubles
- 2018 Bendigo Women's International

Final
- Champions: (Australia) Ellen Perez (Australia) Arina Rodionova
- Runners-up: (Japan) Eri Hozumi (Japan) Risa Ozaki
- Score: 7–5, 6–1

Events
| Singles | Doubles |
| ← 2017 · | Bendigo Women's International | · 2019 → |

Alison Bai and Zoe Hives were the defending champions, but lost in the semifinals to Eri Hozumi and Risa Ozaki.

Ellen Perez and Arina Rodionova won the title, defeating Hozumi and Ozaki in the final, 7–5, 6–1.

== Seeds ==
1. (Australia) Ellen Perez / (Australia) Arina Rodionova (champions)
2. (United Kingdom) Katy Dunne / (New Zealand) Erin Routliffe (first round)
3. (Australia) Alison Bai / (Australia) Zoe Hives (semifinals)
4. (Australia) Destanee Aiava / (Australia) Naiktha Bains (semifinals)

== Draw ==
=== Key ===
- Q = Qualifier
- WC = Wild card
- LL = Lucky loser
- Alt = Alternate
- SE = Special exempt
- PR = Protected ranking
- ITF = ITF entry
- JE = Junior exempt
- w/o = Walkover
- r = Retired
- d = Defaulted
- SR = Special ranking

=== Draw ===
First round
1 | (Australia) E Perez (Australia) Ar Rodionova | 6 | 6
(Australia) A Bozovic (Australia) O Tjandramulia | 4 | 2
(Australia) K McPhee (China) S Xu | 6 | 6
Q | (Australia) S Mendez (Australia) A Osborne | 2 | 4
4 | (Australia) D Aiava (Australia) N Bains | 7 | 6
(United Kingdom) JA Burrage (Uzbekistan) A Khabibulina | 5 | 2
Q | (United Kingdom) S Anane (Germany) J Kimmelmann | 1 | 4
(Australia) A Parnaby (Australia) A Smith | 6 | 6
(Japan) H Arakawa (United States) YK Chiang | 6 | 2 | [7]
WC | (Australia) O Rogowska (Australia) I Wallace | 4 | 6 | [10]
(Australia) S Harris (Australia) A Sharma | 1^{r}
3 | (Australia) A Bai (Australia) Z Hives | 1
(Japan) E Hozumi (Japan) R Ozaki | 6 | 3 | [10]
(Japan) M Imanishi (Japan) M Minokoshi | 2 | 6 | [6]
(Australia) L Cabrera (Australia) J Fourlis | 6 | 6^{6} | [10]
2 | (United Kingdom) K Dunne (New Zealand) E Routliffe | 0 | 7^{8} | [7]

Quarterfinals
1 | (Australia) E Perez (Australia) Ar Rodionova | 6 | 6
(Australia) K McPhee (China) S Xu | 4 | 1
4 | (Australia) D Aiava (Australia) N Bains | 6 | 6
(Australia) A Parnaby (Australia) A Smith | 2 | 3
WC | (Australia) O Rogowska (Australia) I Wallace | 2 | 6 | [7]
3 | (Australia) A Bai (Australia) Z Hives | 6 | 4 | [10]
(Japan) E Hozumi (Japan) R Ozaki | 4 | 7^{7} | [10]
(Australia) L Cabrera (Australia) J Fourlis | 6 | 6^{2} | [8]

Semifinals
1 | (Australia) E Perez (Australia) Ar Rodionova | 6 | 6
4 | (Australia) D Aiava (Australia) N Bains | 4 | 1
3 | (Australia) A Bai (Australia) Z Hives | 1 | 4
(Japan) E Hozumi (Japan) R Ozaki | 6 | 6

Final
1 | (Australia) E Perez (Australia) Ar Rodionova | 7 | 6
(Japan) E Hozumi (Japan) R Ozaki | 5 | 1
