= 2018 Bendigo Women's International – Singles =

Singles
- 2018 Bendigo Women's International

Final
- Champion: (Australia) Priscilla Hon
- Runner-up: (Australia) Ellen Perez
- Score: 6–4, 4–6, 7–5

Events
Singles	Doubles
← 2017 ·	Bendigo Women's International	· 2019 →

Tamara Zidanšek was the defending champion, but chose not to participate.

Priscilla Hon won the title, defeating Ellen Perez in an all-Australian final, 6–4, 4–6, 7–5.

== Seeds ==
1. (Australia) Arina Rodionova (first round)
2. (Australia) Olivia Rogowska (quarterfinals)
3. (United Kingdom) Gabriella Taylor (semifinals)
4. (Australia) Priscilla Hon (champion)
5. (Australia) Jaimee Fourlis (first round)
6. (Australia) Destanee Aiava (quarterfinals)
7. (Australia) Ellen Perez (final)
8. (Australia) Lizette Cabrera (semifinals)

== Draw ==
=== Key ===
- Q = Qualifier
- WC = Wild card
- LL = Lucky loser
- Alt = Alternate
- SE = Special exempt
- PR = Protected ranking
- ITF = ITF entry
- JE = Junior exempt
- w/o = Walkover
- r = Retired
- d = Defaulted
- SR = Special ranking

=== Finals ===
Semifinals
8	(Australia) Lizette Cabrera	4	6	2
4	(Australia) Priscilla Hon	6	4	6
3	(United Kingdom) Gabriella Taylor	6^{7}	7^{7}	4
7	(Australia) Ellen Perez	7^{9}	6^{2}	6

Final
4	(Australia) Priscilla Hon	6	4	7
7	(Australia) Ellen Perez	4	6	5

=== Top half ===
First round
1	(Australia) Ar Rodionova	6	4	3
(China) S Xu	3	6	6
Q	(France) M Partaud	2	0
(Papua New Guinea) A Tere-Apisah	6	6
(Australia) K McPhee	3	6	6^{6}
WC	(Australia) S Harris	6	2	7^{8}
(Australia) Z Hives	3	4
8	(Australia) L Cabrera	6	6
4	(Australia) P Hon	6	6
(Australia) M Inglis	3	1
(Australia) N Bains	6	6
(Australia) A Bai	3	4
(Japan) M Kato	6	3	2
(United Kingdom) K Dunne	3	6	6
(Japan) R Ozaki	4	6^{1}
6	(Australia) D Aiava	6	7^{7}

Second round
(China) S Xu	3	4
(Papua New Guinea) A Tere-Apisah	6	6
WC	(Australia) S Harris
8	(Australia) L Cabrera	w/o
4	(Australia) P Hon	6	6
(Australia) N Bains	3	4
(United Kingdom) K Dunne	1	2
6	(Australia) D Aiava	6	6

Quarterfinals
(Papua New Guinea) A Tere-Apisah	4	4
8	(Australia) L Cabrera	6	6
4	(Australia) P Hon	6	6^{6}	6
6	(Australia) D Aiava	2	7^{8}	3

Semifinals
8	(Australia) L Cabrera	4	6	2
4	(Australia) P Hon	6	4	6

=== Bottom half ===
First round
5	(Australia) J Fourlis	1	6^{5}
Q	(United Kingdom) JA Burrage	6	7^{7}
Q	(Australia) A Sharma	2	7	6
(Slovakia) Z Zlochová	6	5	3
(Australia) A Bozovic	2	3
(Japan) M Minokoshi	6	6
(Japan) M Imanishi	0	2
3	(United Kingdom) G Taylor	6	6
7	(Australia) E Perez	6	6
Q	(Italy) V Meliss	4	4
(Australia) O Tjandramulia	2	4
(Japan) E Hozumi	6	6
WC	(Australia) S Tomic	4	3
(Australia) I Wallace	6	6
(Australia) A Myers	3	2
2	(Australia) O Rogowska	6	6

Second round
Q	(United Kingdom) JA Burrage	6	6^{7}	1
Q	(Australia) A Sharma	3	7^{9}	6
(Japan) M Minokoshi	2	4
3	(United Kingdom) G Taylor	6	6
7	(Australia) E Perez	6	6
(Japan) E Hozumi	1	0
(Australia) I Wallace	2	3
2	(Australia) O Rogowska	6	6

Quarterfinals
Q	(Australia) A Sharma	4	5
3	(United Kingdom) G Taylor	6	7
7	(Australia) E Perez	6	3	6
2	(Australia) O Rogowska	4	6	4

Semifinals
3	(United Kingdom) G Taylor	6^{7}	7^{7}	4
7	(Australia) E Perez	7^{9}	6^{2}	6
