= 2017 Bendigo Women's International – Doubles =

Doubles
- 2017 Bendigo Women's International

Final
- Champion: (Australia) Alison Bai (Australia) Zoe Hives
- Runner-up: (United States) Asia Muhammad (Australia) Arina Rodionova
- Score: 4–6, 6–4, [10–8]

Events
Singles	Doubles
← 2016 ·	Bendigo Women's International	· 2018 →

Asia Muhammad and Arina Rodionova were the defending champions, but they lost in the final to Alison Bai and Zoe Hives, 4–6, 6–4, [10–8].

== Seeds ==
1. (United States) Asia Muhammad / (Australia) Arina Rodionova (final)
2. (Israel) Julia Glushko / (Australia) Priscilla Hon (quarterfinals; retired)
3. (Australia) Jessica Moore / (Australia) Ellen Perez (semifinals)
4. (Australia) Naiktha Bains / (Papua New Guinea) Abigail Tere-Apisah (first round)

== Draw ==
=== Key ===
- Q = Qualifier
- WC = Wild card
- LL = Lucky loser
- Alt = Alternate
- SE = Special exempt
- PR = Protected ranking
- ITF = ITF entry
- JE = Junior exempt
- w/o = Walkover
- r = Retired
- d = Defaulted
- SR = Special ranking

First round
1	(United States) A Muhammad (Australia) Ar Rodionova	6	6
WC	(Australia) A Parnaby (Australia) A Smith	2	4
(Australia) D Aiava (Australia) O Tjandramulia	2	7	[10]
(Australia) T Patterson (Australia) O Rogowska	6	5	[5]
4	(Australia) N Bains (Papua New Guinea) A Tere-Apisah	4	6	[7]
Q	(Japan) M Minokoshi (Japan) R Ueda	6	4	[10]
(Australia) G Da Silva-Fick (Australia) S Sanders	4	4
(Australia) A Sharma (Australia) B Woolcock	6	6
Q	(Sweden) E Allgurin (France) A Lim	1	3
WC	(Australia) R McBryde (Australia) K McPhee	6	6
WC	(Australia) A Bozovic (Australia) M Inglis	5	4
3	(Australia) J Moore (Australia) E Perez	7	6
(Australia) G Lorbergs (Australia) I Wallace	1	1
(Australia) A Bai (Australia) Z Hives	6	6
(Australia) K Birrell (United States) J Elie	1	2
2	(Israel) J Glushko (Australia) P Hon	6	6

Quarterfinals
1	(United States) A Muhammad (Australia) Ar Rodionova	6	6
(Australia) D Aiava (Australia) O Tjandramulia	4	1
Q	(Japan) M Minokoshi (Japan) R Ueda	7^{7}	4	[10]
(Australia) A Sharma (Australia) B Woolcock	6^{2}	6	[4]
WC	(Australia) R McBryde (Australia) K McPhee	2	6^{6}
3	(Australia) J Moore (Australia) E Perez	6	7^{8}
(Australia) A Bai (Australia) Z Hives	7^{7}	0
2	(Israel) J Glushko (Australia) P Hon	6^{5}	0^{r}

Semifinals
1	(United States) A Muhammad (Australia) Ar Rodionova	6	6
Q	(Japan) M Minokoshi (Japan) R Ueda	4	4
3	(Australia) J Moore (Australia) E Perez	5	6	[4]
(Australia) A Bai (Australia) Z Hives	7	4	[10]

Final
1	(United States) A Muhammad (Australia) Ar Rodionova	6	4	[8]
(Australia) A Bai (Australia) Z Hives	4	6	[10]
