= 2017 Bendigo Women's International – Singles =

Singles
- 2017 Bendigo Women's International

Final
- Champion: (Slovenia) Tamara Zidanšek
- Runner-up: (Australia) Olivia Rogowska
- Score: 5–7, 6–1, 6–0

Events
Singles	Doubles
← 2016 ·	Bendigo Women's International	· 2018 →

Risa Ozaki was the defending champion, but chose to compete in Tokyo instead.

Tamara Zidanšek won the title, defeating Olivia Rogowska in the final, 5–7, 6–1, 6–0.

== Seeds ==
1. (Australia) Arina Rodionova (quarterfinals)
2. (United States) Asia Muhammad (first round)
3. (Australia) Destanee Aiava (second round)
4. (Slovenia) Tamara Zidanšek (champion)
5. (Australia) Priscilla Hon (first round)
6. (Australia) Olivia Rogowska (final)
7. (Australia) Isabelle Wallace (quarterfinals)
8. (Japan) Erika Sema (first round)

== Draw ==
=== Key ===
- Q = Qualifier
- WC = Wild card
- LL = Lucky loser
- Alt = Alternate
- SE = Special exempt
- PR = Protected ranking
- ITF = ITF entry
- JE = Junior exempt
- w/o = Walkover
- r = Retired
- d = Defaulted
- SR = Special ranking

=== Finals ===
Semifinals
(Papua New Guinea) Abigail Tere-Apisah	6	4	2
6	(Australia) Olivia Rogowska	1	6	6
4	(Slovenia) Tamara Zidanšek	6	7^{7}
(Japan) Mai Minokoshi	1	6^{5}

Final
6	(Australia) Olivia Rogowska	7	1	0
4	(Slovenia) Tamara Zidanšek	5	6	6

=== Top half ===
First round
1	(Australia) Ar Rodionova	6	6
(Australia) A Bai	3	0
(Australia) S Sanders	6^{2}	3
(Australia) A Sharma	7^{7}	6
Q	(Australia) G Lorbergs	0	3
(Australia) N Bains	6	6
(Papua New Guinea) A Tere-Apisah	6	6
5	(Australia) P Hon	4	1
3	(Australia) D Aiava	6	6
(Israel) J Glushko	1	2
(Australia) B Woolcock	6	2	1
(Australia) T Patterson	3	6	6
Q	(Ukraine) M Zakarlyuk	7	6^{3}	6
(Australia) J Moore	5	7^{7}	4
Q	(Japan) R Ueda	0	4
6	(Australia) O Rogowska	6	6

Second round
1	(Australia) Ar Rodionova	6	7
(Australia) A Sharma	4	5
(Australia) N Bains	5	3
(Papua New Guinea) A Tere-Apisah	7	6
3	(Australia) D Aiava	5	4
(Australia) T Patterson	7	6
Q	(Ukraine) M Zakarlyuk	0	2
6	(Australia) O Rogowska	6	6

Quarterfinals
1	(Australia) Ar Rodionova	2	1
(Papua New Guinea) A Tere-Apisah	6	6
(Australia) T Patterson	4	2^{r}
6	(Australia) O Rogowska	6	3

Semifinals
(Papua New Guinea) A Tere-Apisah	6	4	2
6	(Australia) O Rogowska	1	6	6

=== Bottom half ===
First round
7	(Australia) I Wallace	6	6
(Australia) A Bozovic	2	1
(Sweden) E Allgurin	6	3	1
(Australia) K Birrell	4	6	6
Q	(Australia) I Popovic	4	2
(United States) J Elie	6	6
(Australia) E Perez	4	2
4	(Slovenia) T Zidanšek	6	6
8	(Japan) E Sema	4	3
(Japan) M Minokoshi	6	6
(Australia) Z Hives	6	6
(Australia) M Inglis	2	3
(France) A Lim	7^{7}	7
(Australia) O Tjandramulia	6^{3}	5
(Australia) S Tomic	6	7^{7}
2	(United States) A Muhammad	3	6^{2}

Second round
7	(Australia) I Wallace	6	4	7^{7}
(Australia) K Birrell	3	6	6^{5}
(United States) J Elie	6	0	3
4	(Slovenia) T Zidanšek	0	6	6
(Japan) M Minokoshi	4	6	6
(Australia) Z Hives	6	4	1
(France) A Lim	6	1	6^{3}
(Australia) S Tomic	0	6	7^{7}

Quarterfinals
7	(Australia) I Wallace	3	4
4	(Slovenia) T Zidanšek	6	6
(Japan) M Minokoshi	4	6	6
(Australia) S Tomic	6	1	3

Semifinals
4	(Slovenia) T Zidanšek	6	7^{7}
(Japan) M Minokoshi	1	6^{5}
