= 2019 Bendigo Women's International – Doubles =

Doubles
- 2019 Bendigo Women's International

Final
- Champions: (Australia) Maddison Inglis (Australia) Kaylah McPhee
- Runners-up: (United Kingdom) Naiktha Bains (Slovakia) Tereza Mihalíková
- Score: 3–6, 6–2, [10–2]

Events
Singles	Doubles
← 2018 ·	Bendigo Women's International	· 2022 →

Ellen Perez and Arina Rodionova were the defending champions, but chose not to participate.

Maddison Inglis and Kaylah McPhee won the title, defeating Naiktha Bains and Tereza Mihalíková in the final, 3–6, 6–2, [10–2].

== Seeds ==
1. (Japan) Eri Hozumi / (United States) Asia Muhammad (quarterfinals, withdrew)
2. (Australia) Destanee Aiava / (Australia) Lizette Cabrera (quarterfinals)
3. (United Kingdom) Naiktha Bains / (Slovakia) Tereza Mihalíková (final)
4. (Japan) Erina Hayashi / (Japan) Kyōka Okamura (first round)

== Draw ==
=== Key ===
- Q = Qualifier
- WC = Wild card
- LL = Lucky loser
- Alt = Alternate
- SE = Special exempt
- PR = Protected ranking
- ITF = ITF entry
- JE = Junior exempt
- w/o = Walkover
- r = Retired
- d = Defaulted
- SR = Special ranking

=== Draw ===
First round
1	(Japan) E Hozumi (United States) A Muhammad	w/o
(Australia) A Bai (Australia) G Da Silva-Fick
(Australia) A Bozovic (Australia) A Marshall	6	6
(United States) J Elie (Australia) M Jovanovic	4	3
3	(United Kingdom) N Bains (Slovakia) T Mihalíková	6	6
(Australia) A Parnaby (Australia) A Smith	1	1
(Australia) I Bozicevic (Australia) A Poulos	2	6	[10]
(Australia) L Ashley (Australia) T Lawless	6	2	[4]
(Japan) H Arakawa (Japan) C Muramatsu	2	5
(Australia) P Hon (Australia) S Sanders	6	7
(Australia) M Inglis (Australia) K McPhee	6	6
4	(Japan) E Hayashi (Japan) K Okamura	2	4
(Australia) S Tomic (Slovakia) Z Zlochová	5	1
(Australia) A Myers (Australia) B Woolcock	7	6
(Japan) M Imanishi (Japan) H Kuwata	4	4
2	(Australia) D Aiava (Australia) L Cabrera	6	6

Quarterfinals
1	(Japan) E Hozumi (United States) A Muhammad
(Australia) A Bozovic (Australia) A Marshall	w/o
3	(United Kingdom) N Bains (Slovakia) T Mihalíková	6	7^{7}
(Australia) I Bozicevic (Australia) A Poulos	3	6^{1}
(Australia) P Hon (Australia) S Sanders	6	3	[8]
(Australia) M Inglis (Australia) K McPhee	1	6	[10]
(Australia) A Myers (Australia) B Woolcock	7^{7}	6
2	(Australia) D Aiava (Australia) L Cabrera	6^{3}	2

Semifinals
(Australia) A Bozovic (Australia) A Marshall	6	3	[7]
3	(United Kingdom) N Bains (Slovakia) T Mihalíková	3	6	[10]
(Australia) M Inglis (Australia) K McPhee	7^{8}	2	[10]
(Australia) A Myers (Australia) B Woolcock	6^{6}	6	[6]

Final
3	(United Kingdom) N Bains (Slovakia) T Mihalíková	6	2	[2]
(Australia) M Inglis (Australia) K McPhee	3	6	[10]
