= 2019 Bendigo Women's International – Singles =

Singles
- 2019 Bendigo Women's International

Final
- Champion: (Australia) Lizette Cabrera
- Runner-up: (Australia) Maddison Inglis
- Score: 6–2, 6–3

Events
Singles	Doubles
← 2018 ·	Bendigo Women's International	· 2022 →

Priscilla Hon was the defending champion, but lost to Maddison Inglis in the semifinals.

Lizette Cabrera won the title, defeating Inglis in an all-Australian final, 6–2, 6–3.

== Seeds ==
1. (Australia) Priscilla Hon (semifinals)
2. (Australia) Lizette Cabrera (champion)
3. (Australia) Maddison Inglis (final)
4. (Australia) Destanee Aiava (quarterfinals)
5. (Australia) Kaylah McPhee (second round)
6. (United States) Asia Muhammad (second round)
7. (Japan) Ayano Shimizu (second round)
8. (Australia) Olivia Rogowska (quarterfinals)

== Draw ==
=== Key ===
- Q = Qualifier
- WC = Wild card
- LL = Lucky loser
- Alt = Alternate
- SE = Special exempt
- PR = Protected ranking
- ITF = ITF entry
- JE = Junior exempt
- w/o = Walkover
- r = Retired
- d = Defaulted
- SR = Special ranking

=== Finals ===
Semifinals
1	(Australia) Priscilla Hon	4	4
3	(Australia) Maddison Inglis	6	6
(Japan) Kyōka Okamura	6	1	6^{0}
2	(Australia) Lizette Cabrera	3	6	7^{7}

Final
3	(Australia) Maddison Inglis	2	3
2	(Australia) Lizette Cabrera	6	6

=== Top half ===
First round
1	(Australia) P Hon	6^{4}	6	6
(Australia) A Myers	7^{7}	1	4
(Australia) B Woolcock	6	5	6
WC	(Australia) A Smith	4	7	1
(Japan) M Imanishi	1	4
Q	(United States) J Elie	6	6
Q	(Slovakia) T Mihalíková	6^{6}	6	3
8	(Australia) O Rogowska	7^{8}	3	6
3	(Australia) M Inglis	7	6
(Japan) M Osaka	5	4
(United Kingdom) N Bains	6^{4}	4
(Japan) R Ozaki	7^{7}	6
WC	(Australia) A Bai	4	1
(Japan) C Muramatsu	6	6
WC	(Australia) M Jovanovic	2	1
5	(Australia) K McPhee	6	6

Second round
1	(Australia) P Hon	7^{7}	6
(Australia) B Woolcock	6^{3}	4
Q	(United States) J Elie	5	3
8	(Australia) O Rogowska	7	6
3	(Australia) M Inglis	6	7^{7}
(Japan) R Ozaki	2	6^{5}
(Japan) C Muramatsu	7^{7}	6
5	(Australia) K McPhee	6^{5}	2

Quarterfinals
1	(Australia) P Hon	4	6	6
8	(Australia) O Rogowska	6	2	3
3	(Australia) M Inglis	6	6
(Japan) C Muramatsu	2	2

Semifinals
1	(Australia) P Hon	4	4
3	(Australia) M Inglis	6	6

=== Bottom half ===
First round
7	(Japan) A Shimizu	6	6
Q	(Australia) A Parnaby	3	0
Q	(Australia) A Marshall	3	0
(Japan) K Okamura	6	6
LL	(Japan) E Hayashi	6^{2}	0
WC	(Australia) S Tomic	7^{7}	6
SE	(Japan) E Hozumi	7^{7}	6^{3}	1
4	(Australia) D Aiava	6^{2}	7^{7}	6
6	(United States) A Muhammad	7	6
Q	(Japan) H Arakawa	5	0
(Slovakia) Z Zlochová	1	1
Q	(Australia) S Sanders	6	6
(Japan) H Kuwata	3	6	7^{7}
Q	(Australia) T Lawless	6	0	6^{3}
Q	(Australia) L Ashley	1	1
2	(Australia) L Cabrera	6	6

Second round
7	(Japan) A Shimizu	4	3
(Japan) K Okamura	6	6
WC	(Australia) S Tomic	6	3	0
4	(Australia) D Aiava	3	6	6
6	(United States) A Muhammad	1	0
Q	(Australia) S Sanders	6	6
(Japan) H Kuwata	0	1
2	(Australia) L Cabrera	6	6

Quarterfinals
(Japan) K Okamura	6	6
4	(Australia) D Aiava	2	4
Q	(Australia) S Sanders	7	0	2
2	(Australia) L Cabrera	5	6	6

Semifinals
(Japan) K Okamura	6	1	6^{0}
2	(Australia) L Cabrera	3	6	7^{7}
