= 2022 Bendigo International =

Tennis tournament

- Date: 3–9 January 2022
- Edition: 14th (women); 2nd (men)
- Category: ATP Challenger 80; ITF W60
- Prize money: $58,320 (men) $60,000+H (women)
- Surface: Hard
- Location: Bendigo, Australia

Champions

Men's singles
- (United States) Ernesto Escobedo

Women's singles
- (Belgium) Ysaline Bonaventure

Men's doubles
- (Belgium) Ruben Bemelmans / (Germany) Daniel Masur

Women's doubles
- (Mexico) Fernanda Contreras / (United States) Alycia Parks
| ← 2020 · | Bendigo International | · 2023 → |

The 2022 Bendigo International was a professional tennis tournament played on outdoor hard courts. It was the fourteenth (women) and second (men) editions of the tournament which was part of the 2022 ATP Challenger Tour and the 2022 ITF Women's World Tennis Tour. It took place in Bendigo, Australia between 3 and 9 January 2022.

== Men's singles main-draw entrants ==
=== Seeds ===
| Country | Player | Rank^{1} | Seed |
|---|---|---|---|
| SRB | Nikola Milojević | 138 | 1 |
| TUR | Cem İlkel | 144 | 2 |
| FRA | Hugo Grenier | 150 | 3 |
| FRA | Quentin Halys | 151 | 4 |
| ITA | Salvatore Caruso | 157 | 5 |
| BIH | Damir Džumhur | 158 | 6 |
| USA | Stefan Kozlov | 159 | 7 |
| USA | Ernesto Escobedo | 164 | 8 |
| TPE | Jason Jung | 178 | 9 |
| FRA | Enzo Couacaud | 179 | 10 |
| KAZ | Dmitry Popko | 180 | 11 |
| SLO | Blaž Rola | 181 | 12 |
| GER | Daniel Masur | 183 | 13 |
| BUL | Dimitar Kuzmanov | 187 | 14 |
| ARG | Renzo Olivo | 189 | 15 |
| BEL | Zizou Bergs | 192 | 16 |

- ^{1} Rankings are as of 27 December 2021.

=== Other entrants ===
The following players received wildcards into the singles main draw:

- (Australia) Moerani Bouzige
- (Australia) Thomas Fancutt
- (Australia) ~~Omar Jasika~~
- (Australia) James McCabe
- (Australia) Matthew Romios

The following players received entry from the qualifying draw:

- (Australia) Aaron Addison
- (Australia) Matthew Dellavedova
- (Australia) Kody Pearson
- (Czech Republic) Jaroslav Pospíšil

The following players received entry as lucky losers:

- (Australia) Charlie Camus
- (Australia) Cooper Errey

== Women's singles main-draw entrants ==
=== Seeds ===
| Country | Player | Rank^{1} | Seed |
|---|---|---|---|
| ESP | Cristina Bucșa | 161 | 1 |
| ESP | Rebeka Masarova | 163 | 2 |
| SUI | Ylena In-Albon | 166 | 3 |
| USA | Grace Min | 171 | 4 |
| ~~USA~~ | ~~Robin Anderson~~ | ~~172~~ | ~~5~~ |
| USA | CoCo Vandeweghe | 174 | 6 |
| GEO | Mariam Bolkvadze | 176 | 7 |
| USA | Jamie Loeb | 178 | 8 |
| NED | Arianne Hartono | 187 | 9 |

- ^{1} Rankings are as of 27 December 2021.

=== Other entrants ===
The following players received wildcards into the singles main draw:

- (Australia) Catherine Aulia
- (Australia) Alison Bai
- (Australia) Talia Gibson
- (Australia) Alana Parnaby

The following players received entry from the qualifying draw:

- (United States) Hanna Chang
- (Mexico) Fernanda Contreras
- (Andorra) Victoria Jiménez Kasintseva
- (Japan) Yuki Naito
- (United States) Whitney Osuigwe
- (Liechtenstein) Kathinka von Deichmann
- (China) You Xiaodi
- (Switzerland) Joanne Züger

The following players received entry as a lucky loser:

- (Indonesia) Beatrice Gumulya

== Champions ==
=== Men's singles ===
- (United States) Ernesto Escobedo def. (France) Enzo Couacaud 5–7, 6–3, 7–5.

=== Women's singles ===
- (Belgium) Ysaline Bonaventure def. (Andorra) Victoria Jiménez Kasintseva, 6–3, 6–1

=== Men's doubles ===
- (Belgium) Ruben Bemelmans / (Germany) Daniel Masur def. (France) Enzo Couacaud / (Slovenia) Blaž Rola 7–6^{(7–2)}, 6–4.

=== Women's doubles ===
- (Mexico) Fernanda Contreras / (United States) Alycia Parks def. (Australia) Alison Bai / (Australia) Alana Parnaby, 6–3, 6–1
