= 2022 Bendigo International – Men's doubles =

Men's doubles
- 2022 Bendigo International

Final
- Champions: (Belgium) Ruben Bemelmans (Germany) Daniel Masur
- Runners-up: (France) Enzo Couacaud (Slovenia) Blaž Rola
- Score: 7–6^{(7–2)}, 6–4

Events
Singles	men	women
Doubles	men	women
← 2020 ·	Bendigo International	· 2023 →

Nikola Ćaćić and Denys Molchanov were the defending champions but chose not to participate.

Ruben Bemelmans and Daniel Masur won the title after defeating Enzo Couacaud and Blaž Rola 7–6^{(7–2)}, 6–4 in the final.

== Seeds ==
1. (Belgium) Ruben Bemelmans / (Germany) Daniel Masur (champions)
2. (France) Enzo Couacaud / (Slovenia) Blaž Rola (final)
3. (Italy) Filippo Baldi / (Italy) Salvatore Caruso (withdrew)
4. (Belgium) Zizou Bergs / (Italy) Flavio Cobolli (quarterfinals)

== Draw ==
Key

- Q = Qualifier
- WC = Wild card
- LL = Lucky loser
- Alt = Alternate
- ITF = ITF entry
- PR = Protected ranking
- SR = Special ranking
- SE = Special exempt
- JE = Junior exempt
- JR = Junior Accelerator Programme entrant
- CO = College Accelerator Programme entrant
- NG = Next Gen Accelerator Program entrant
- w/o = Walkover
- r = Retired
- d = Defaulted

First round
WC	(Australia) J McCabe (Australia) M Romios	6	6
Alt	(Australia) A Addison (Australia) M Bouzige	4	2
WC	(Australia) T Fancutt (Australia) L Tu
(Bulgaria) D Kuzmanov (Egypt) M Safwat	w/o

Quarterfinals
1	(Belgium) R Bemelmans (Germany) D Masur	6	6
WC	(Australia) J McCabe (Australia) M Romios	3	4
(Bulgaria) D Kuzmanov (Egypt) M Safwat
Alt	(Italy) T Fabbiano (Kazakhstan) D Popko	6	6
4	(Belgium) Z Bergs (Italy) F Cobolli	3	2
(Australia) K Pearson (Czech Republic) J Pospíšil	4	3
2	(France) E Couacaud (Slovenia) B Rola	6	6

Semifinals
1	(Belgium) R Bemelmans (Germany) D Masur	6	6
(Bulgaria) D Kuzmanov (Egypt) M Safwat	2	2
Alt	(Italy) T Fabbiano (Kazakhstan) D Popko	3	7^{7}	[2]
2	(France) E Couacaud (Slovenia) B Rola	6	6^{4}	[10]

Final
1	(Belgium) R Bemelmans (Germany) D Masur	7^{7}	6
2	(France) E Couacaud (Slovenia) B Rola	6^{2}	4
