= 2022 Bendigo International – Women's doubles =

Women's doubles
- 2022 Bendigo International

Final
- Champions: (Mexico) Fernanda Contreras (United States) Alycia Parks
- Runners-up: (Australia) Alison Bai (Australia) Alana Parnaby
- Score: 6–3, 6–1

Events
Singles	men	women
Doubles	men	women
- Bendigo International

Maddison Inglis and Kaylah McPhee are the defending champions but chose not to participate.

Fernanda Contreras and Alycia Parks lost the title, losing against Alison Bai and Alana Parnaby in the final, 6–3, 6–1.

== Seeds ==
1. (Spain) Cristina Bucșa / (Indonesia) Jessy Rompies (semifinals)
2. (Georgia (country)) Mariam Bolkvadze / (Russia) Valeria Savinykh (quarterfinals)
3. (Sweden) Mirjam Björklund / (United States) Jamie Loeb (first round)
4. (United Kingdom) Naiktha Bains / (Indonesia) Beatrice Gumulya (first round)

== Draw ==
Key

- Q = Qualifier
- WC = Wild card
- LL = Lucky loser
- Alt = Alternate
- ITF = ITF entry
- PR = Protected ranking
- SR = Special ranking
- SE = Special exempt
- JE = Junior exempt
- JR = Junior Accelerator Programme entrant
- CO = College Accelerator Programme entrant
- NG = Next Gen Accelerator Program entrant
- w/o = Walkover
- r = Retired
- d = Defaulted

=== Draw ===
First round
(Germany) K Gerlach (Bosnia and Herzegovina) D Herdželaš	6	6
(Australia) J Cvijanovic (Australia) Z Morris	0	1
3	(Sweden) M Björklund (United States) J Loeb	7	6^{6}	[8]
(Switzerland) Y In-Albon (Liechtenstein) K von Deichmann	5	7^{8}	[10]
(Mexico) F Contreras (United States) A Parks	6	6
(Russia) E Avanesyan (Belarus) Y Hatouka	2	4
(Australia) T Bajagic (Australia) S Webb	7	6
(Australia) J Carbis (Australia) L Serna	5	1
(Australia) A Bai (Australia) A Parnaby	6	6
4	(United Kingdom) N Bains (Indonesia) B Gumulya	3	2
(Australia) T Dong (Australia) E Micic	7^{8}	2	[8]
(Japan) Y Naito (Switzerland) C Perrin	6^{6}	6	[10]
(United States) M-S Mukama (Australia) N Pratt	0	1
2	(Georgia (country)) M Bolkvadze (Russia) V Savinykh	6	6

Quarterfinals
1	(Spain) C Bucșa (Indonesia) J Rompies	6	6
(Germany) K Gerlach (Bosnia and Herzegovina) D Herdželaš	3	3
(Switzerland) Y In-Albon (Liechtenstein) K von Deichmann
(Mexico) F Contreras (United States) A Parks	w/o
(Australia) T Bajagic (Australia) S Webb	7^{8}	2	[4]
(Australia) A Bai (Australia) A Parnaby	6^{6}	6	[10]
(Japan) Y Naito (Switzerland) C Perrin	7	7^{7}
2	(Georgia (country)) M Bolkvadze (Russia) V Savinykh	5	6^{5}

Semifinals
1	(Spain) C Bucșa (Indonesia) J Rompies	3	5
(Mexico) F Contreras (United States) A Parks	6	7
(Australia) A Bai (Australia) A Parnaby	6	6
(Japan) Y Naito (Switzerland) C Perrin	2	3

Final
(Mexico) F Contreras (United States) A Parks	6	6
(Australia) A Bai (Australia) A Parnaby	3	1
