= 2022 Bendigo International – Women's singles =

Women's singles
- 2022 Bendigo International

Final
- Champion: (Belgium) Ysaline Bonaventure
- Runner-up: (Andorra) Victoria Jiménez Kasintseva
- Score: 6–3, 6–1

Events
Singles	men	women
Doubles	men	women
← 2019 ·	Bendigo International	· 2023 →

Lizette Cabrera was the defending champion, but chose to compete at the 2022 Melbourne Summer Set instead.

Ysaline Bonaventure won the title, defeating Victoria Jiménez Kasintseva in the final, 6–3, 6–1.

== Seeds ==
1. (Spain) Cristina Bucșa (second round)
2. (Spain) Rebeka Masarova (first round)
3. (Switzerland) Ylena In-Albon (first round)
4. (United States) Grace Min (first round)
5. (United States) Robin Anderson (withdrew)
6. (United States) CoCo Vandeweghe (semifinals)
7. (Georgia (country)) Mariam Bolkvadze (first round)
8. (United States) Jamie Loeb (second round)
9. (Netherlands) Arianne Hartono (second round)

== Draw ==
=== Key ===
- Q = Qualifier
- WC = Wild card
- LL = Lucky loser
- Alt = Alternate
- SE = Special exempt
- PR = Protected ranking
- ITF = ITF entry
- JE = Junior exempt
- w/o = Walkover
- r = Retired
- d = Defaulted
- SR = Special ranking

=== Finals ===
Semifinals
6	(United States) CoCo Vandeweghe	5	6	3
Q	(Andorra) Victoria Jiménez Kasintseva	7	4	6
Q	(Liechtenstein) Kathinka von Deichmann	2	3
(Belgium) Ysaline Bonaventure	6	6

Final
Q	(Andorra) Victoria Jiménez Kasintseva	3	1
(Belgium) Ysaline Bonaventure	6	6

=== Top half ===
First round
1	(Spain) C Bucșa	7	6
(Germany) K Gerlach	5	3
(Belarus) Y Hatouka	7	2	6
(Sweden) M Björklund	5	6	2
Q	(United States) H Chang	2	7^{7}	7^{7}
WC	(Australia) T Gibson	6	6^{4}	6^{1}
Q	(Japan) Y Naito	4	6	2
6	(United States) C Vandeweghe	6	3	6
4	(United States) G Min	4	2
Q	(Andorra) V Jiménez Kasintseva	6	6
(Bosnia and Herzegovina) D Herdželaš	6	6
LL	(Indonesia) B Gumulya	1	3
Q	(Switzerland) J Züger	6	2	6
Q	(China) X You	4	6	1
WC	(Australia) A Parnaby	0	2
9	(Netherlands) A Hartono	6	6

Second round
1	(Spain) C Bucșa	2	4
(Belarus) Y Hatouka	6	6
Q	(United States) H Chang	4	6	2
6	(United States) C Vandeweghe	6	3	6
Q	(Andorra) V Jiménez Kasintseva	6	6
(Bosnia and Herzegovina) D Herdželaš	1	3
Q	(Switzerland) J Züger	6	6
9	(Netherlands) A Hartono	2	1

Quarterfinals
(Belarus) Y Hatouka	6^{3}	2
6	(United States) C Vandeweghe	7^{7}	6
Q	(Andorra) V Jiménez Kasintseva	6	6
Q	(Switzerland) J Züger	3	1

Semifinals
6	(United States) C Vandeweghe	5	6	3
Q	(Andorra) V Jiménez Kasintseva	7	4	6

=== Bottom half ===
First round
7	(Georgia (country)) M Bolkvadze	1	4
Q	(Liechtenstein) K von Deichmann	6	6
(United States) A Parks	6	6^{3}	6
WC	(Australia) A Bai	3	7^{7}	3
(Switzerland) C Perrin	3	6	1
(Russia) E Avanesyan	6	3	6
(Russia) V Savinykh	6	6
3	(Switzerland) Y In-Albon	2	1
8	(United States) J Loeb	6	6
WC	(Australia) C Aulia	1	2
Q	(Mexico) F Contreras	0	6	6
(Paraguay) V Cepede Royg	6	4	3
(Belgium) Y Bonaventure	6	6
(Italy) F Di Sarra	0	3
Q	(United States) W Osuigwe	6	7^{7}
2	(Spain) R Masarova	3	6^{4}

Second round
Q	(Liechtenstein) K von Deichmann	6	6
(United States) A Parks	1	3
(Russia) E Avanesyan	6	6^{5}	6
(Russia) V Savinykh	4	7^{7}	3
8	(United States) J Loeb	3	3
Q	(Mexico) F Contreras	6	6
(Belgium) Y Bonaventure	6	6
Q	(United States) W Osuigwe	3	1

Quarterfinals
Q	(Liechtenstein) K von Deichmann	7	6
(Russia) E Avanesyan	5	2
Q	(Mexico) F Contreras	5	4
(Belgium) Y Bonaventure	7	6

Semifinals
Q	(Liechtenstein) K von Deichmann	2	3
(Belgium) Y Bonaventure	6	6
