= 2019 Bendigo Women's International =

- Date: 21–27 October 2019
- Edition: 13th
- Category: ITF Women's World Tennis Tour
- Prize money: $60,000
- Surface: Hard
- Location: Bendigo, Australia

Champions

Singles
- (Australia) Lizette Cabrera

Doubles
- (Australia) Maddison Inglis / (Australia) Kaylah McPhee
← 2018 ·	Bendigo Women's International	· 2020 →

The 2019 Bendigo Women's International was a professional tennis tournament played on outdoor hard courts. It was the thirteenth edition of the tournament which was part of the 2019 ITF Women's World Tennis Tour. It took place in Bendigo, Australia between 21 and 27 October 2019.

== Singles main-draw entrants ==
=== Seeds ===
Country	Player	Rank^{1}	Seed
AUS	Priscilla Hon	118	1
AUS	Lizette Cabrera	154	2
AUS	Maddison Inglis	165	3
AUS	Destanee Aiava	195	4
AUS	Kaylah McPhee	207	5
USA	Asia Muhammad	221	6
JPN	Ayano Shimizu	253	7
AUS	Olivia Rogowska	255	8

- ^{1} Rankings are as of 14 October 2019.

=== Other entrants ===
The following players received wildcards into the singles main draw:

- (Australia) Alison Bai
- (Australia) Masa Jovanovic
- (Australia) Alicia Smith
- (Australia) Sara Tomic

The following player received entry as a special exempt:

- (Japan) Eri Hozumi

The following players received entry from the qualifying draw:

- (Japan) Haruna Arakawa
- (Australia) Laura Ashley
- (United States) Jennifer Elie
- (Australia) Taylah Lawless
- (Australia) Amber Marshall
- (Slovakia) Tereza Mihalíková
- (Australia) Alana Parnaby
- (Australia) Storm Sanders

The following player received entry as a lucky loser:

- (Japan) Erina Hayashi

== Champions ==
=== Singles ===
- (Australia) Lizette Cabrera def. (Australia) Maddison Inglis, 6–2, 6–3

=== Doubles ===
- (Australia) Maddison Inglis / (Australia) Kaylah McPhee def. (United Kingdom) Naiktha Bains / (Slovakia) Tereza Mihalíková, 3–6, 6–2, [10–2]
