= 2022 Bendigo International – Men's singles =

Men's singles
- 2022 Bendigo International

Final
- Champion: (United States) Ernesto Escobedo
- Runner-up: (France) Enzo Couacaud
- Score: 5–7, 6–3, 7–5

Events
Singles	men	women
Doubles	men	women
- Bendigo International

Steve Johnson was the defending champion but chose not to compete.

Ernesto Escobedo won the title after defeating Enzo Couacaud 5–7, 6–3, 7–5 in the final.

== Seeds ==
All seeds receive a bye into the second round.

1. (Serbia) Nikola Milojević (second round)
2. (Turkey) Cem İlkel (second round)
3. (France) Hugo Grenier (quarterfinals, retired)
4. (France) Quentin Halys (quarterfinals)
5. (Italy) Salvatore Caruso (semifinals)
6. (Bosnia and Herzegovina) Damir Džumhur (second round)
7. (United States) Stefan Kozlov (second round)
8. (United States) Ernesto Escobedo (champion)
9. (Chinese Taipei) Jason Jung (third round)
10. (France) Enzo Couacaud (final)
11. (Kazakhstan) Dmitry Popko (quarterfinals)
12. (Slovenia) Blaž Rola (second round)
13. (Germany) Daniel Masur (second round)
14. (Bulgaria) Dimitar Kuzmanov (second round)
15. (Argentina) Renzo Olivo (second round)
16. (Belgium) Zizou Bergs (third round)

== Draw ==
Key

- Q = Qualifier
- WC = Wild card
- LL = Lucky loser
- Alt = Alternate
- ITF = ITF entry
- PR = Protected ranking
- SR = Special ranking
- SE = Special exempt
- JE = Junior exempt
- JR = Junior Accelerator Programme entrant
- CO = College Accelerator Programme entrant
- NG = Next Gen Accelerator Program entrant
- w/o = Walkover
- r = Retired
- d = Defaulted

=== Finals ===
Quarterfinals
(Italy) Franco Agamenone	6	6
11	(Kazakhstan) Dmitry Popko	4	2
4	(France) Quentin Halys	7^{7}	6^{9}	5
10	(France) Enzo Couacaud	6^{5}	7^{11}	7
5	(Italy) Salvatore Caruso	4	7^{7}	4
3	(France) Hugo Grenier	6	6^{5}	0^{r}
8	(United States) Ernesto Escobedo	6	6^{2}	7^{7}
(Czech Republic) Vít Kopřiva	3	7^{7}	6^{2}

Semifinals
(Italy) Franco Agamenone	1	7^{8}	4
10	(France) Enzo Couacaud	6	6^{6}	6
5	(Italy) Salvatore Caruso	3	1
8	(United States) Ernesto Escobedo	6	6

Final
10	(France) Enzo Couacaud	7	3	5
8	(United States) Ernesto Escobedo	5	6	7

=== Top half ===
==== Section 1 ====
First round
(Germany) M Bachinger	4	7^{7}	7^{7}
(Egypt) M Safwat	6	6^{3}	6^{4}
LL	(Australia) Cooper Errey	2	6^{5}
(Italy) F Agamenone	6	7^{7}
(Bosnia and Herzegovina) M Bašić	7^{8}	6
WC	(Australia) T Fancutt	6^{6}	4
(Italy) F Cobolli	6	7^{7}
Q	(Australia) A Addison	2	6^{4}

Second round
1	(Serbia) N Milojević	2	1
(Germany) M Bachinger	6	6
(Italy) F Agamenone	6	6
15	(Argentina) R Olivo	4	2
11	(Kazakhstan) D Popko	6	6
(Bosnia and Herzegovina) M Bašić	2	3
(Italy) F Cobolli	6	3	6
7	(United States) S Kozlov	4	6	1

Third round
(Germany) M Bachinger	4	4
(Italy) F Agamenone	6	6
11	(Kazakhstan) D Popko	6	7
(Italy) F Cobolli	3	5

Quarterfinals
(Italy) F Agamenone	6	6
11	(Kazakhstan) D Popko	4	2

==== Section 2 ====
First round
(United States) M Mmoh	4	6	6
(Denmark) M Torpegaard	6	3	0
(France) M Bourgue	6	6
WC	(Australia) M Bouzige	4	4
(Italy) F Baldi	3	1
(Argentina) N Kicker	6	6
(Italy) T Fabbiano	6	6
(Australia) D Kelly	2	2

Second round
4	(France) Q Halys	7^{7}	3	6
(United States) M Mmoh	6^{5}	6	3
(France) M Bourgue	6	6
13	(Germany) D Masur	3	3
10	(France) E Couacaud	6^{1}	6	6
(Argentina) N Kicker	7^{7}	4	4
(Italy) T Fabbiano	6	6
6	(Bosnia and Herzegovina) D Džumhur	4	4

Third round
4	(France) Q Halys	6	6
(France) M Bourgue	2	4
10	(France) E Couacaud	7	3	6
(Italy) T Fabbiano	5	6	4

Quarterfinals
4	(France) Q Halys	7^{7}	6^{9}	5
10	(France) E Couacaud	6^{5}	7^{11}	7

=== Bottom half ===
==== Section 3 ====
First round
WC	(Australia) J McCabe	0	7^{7}	4
(France) A Müller	6	6^{3}	6
(Portugal) G Elias	6	6
Q	(Australia) K Pearson	2	1
Q	(Czech Republic) J Pospíšil	6	6
WC	(Australia) M Romios	2	3
(Italy) L Giustino	7^{7}	6
LL	(Australia) Charlie Camus	6^{2}	3

Second round
5	(Italy) S Caruso	2	6	6
(France) A Müller	6	2	1
(Portugal) G Elias	6	3	6
12	(Slovenia) B Rola	4	6	3
16	(Belgium) Z Bergs	6	7^{7}
Q	(Czech Republic) J Pospíšil	1	6^{4}
(Italy) L Giustino	6^{5}	0
3	(France) H Grenier	7^{7}	6

Third round
5	(Italy) S Caruso	w/o
(Portugal) G Elias
16	(Belgium) Z Bergs	0	7	6^{5}
3	(France) H Grenier	6	5	7^{7}

Quarterfinals
5	(Italy) S Caruso	4	7^{7}	4
3	(France) H Grenier	6	6^{5}	0^{r}

==== Section 4 ====
First round
(Argentina) M Trungelliti	7	7^{8}
(Italy) GM Moroni	5	6^{6}
(Argentina) C Ugo Carabelli	6	6
(Japan) Y Uchiyama	4	4
(Argentina) F Mena	6	6
Q	(Australia) Matthew Dellavedova	2	1
(Belgium) R Bemelmans	4	4
(Czech Republic) V Kopřiva	6	6

Second round
8	(United States) E Escobedo	6	6
(Argentina) M Trungelliti	1	1
(Argentina) C Ugo Carabelli	6^{6}	6^{1}
9	(Chinese Taipei) J Jung	7^{8}	7^{7}
14	(Bulgaria) D Kuzmanov	6^{7}	4
(Argentina) F Mena	7^{9}	6
(Czech Republic) V Kopřiva	7^{7}	6
2	(Turkey) C İlkel	6^{4}	3

Third round
8	(United States) E Escobedo	6	4	6
9	(Chinese Taipei) J Jung	2	6	2
(Argentina) F Mena	6^{11}	6	3
(Czech Republic) V Kopřiva	7^{13}	4	6

Quarterfinals
8	(United States) E Escobedo	6	6^{2}	7^{7}
(Czech Republic) V Kopřiva	3	7^{7}	6^{2}
