= 2017 Bendigo Women's International =

- Date: 6–12 November
- Edition: 11th
- Category: ITF Women's Circuit
- Prize money: $60,000
- Surface: Hard
- Location: Bendigo, Australia

Champions

Singles
- (Slovenia) Tamara Zidanšek

Doubles
- (Australia) Alison Bai / (Australia) Zoe Hives
← 2016 ·	Bendigo Women's International	· 2018 →

The 2017 Bendigo Women's International was a professional tennis tournament played on outdoor hard courts. It was the eleventh edition of the tournament and was part of the 2017 ITF Women's Circuit. It took place in Bendigo, Australia, on 6–12 November 2017.

== Singles main draw entrants ==
=== Seeds ===
Country	Player	Rank^{1}	Seed
AUS	Arina Rodionova	116	1
USA	Asia Muhammad	153	2
AUS	Destanee Aiava	169	3
SLO	Tamara Zidanšek	187	4
AUS	Priscilla Hon	225	5
AUS	Olivia Rogowska	226	6
AUS	Isabelle Wallace	275	7
JPN	Erika Sema	294	8

- ^{1} Rankings as of 30 October 2017.

=== Other entrants ===
The following players received entry from the qualifying draw:

- (Australia) Genevieve Lorbergs
- (Australia) Ivana Popovic
- (Japan) Ramu Ueda
- (Ukraine) Marianna Zakarlyuk

== Champions ==
=== Singles ===
- (Slovenia) Tamara Zidanšek def. (Australia) Olivia Rogowska, 5–7, 6–1, 6–0

=== Doubles ===
- (Australia) Alison Bai / (Australia) Zoe Hives def. (United States) Asia Muhammad / (Australia) Arina Rodionova, 4–6, 6–4, [10–8]
