= Li Zhe (tennis) =

Chinese tennis player

Li Zhe 李喆
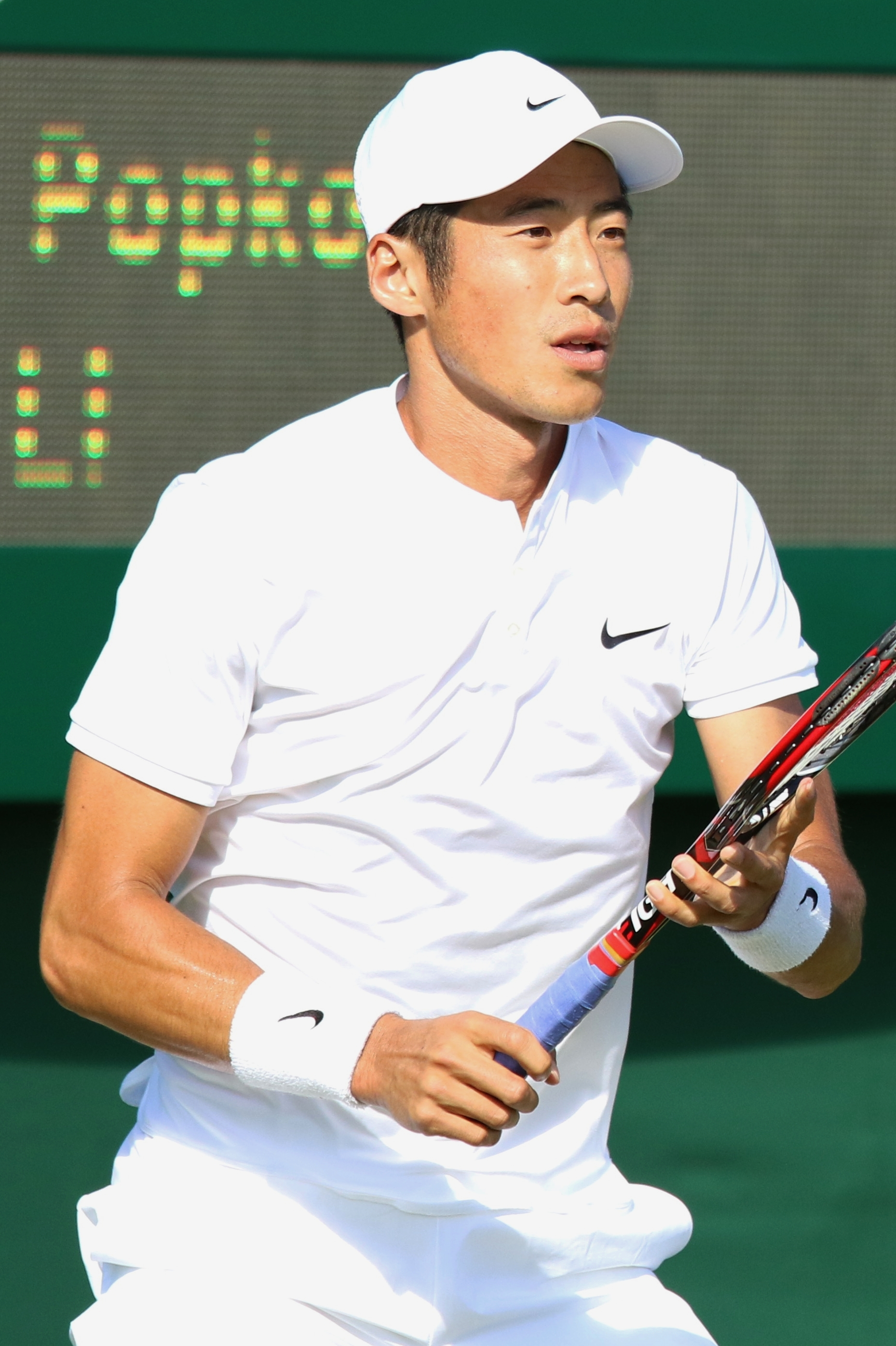
- Country (sports): China
- Residence: Tianjin, China
- Born: 20 September 1986 (age 39) Tianjin, China
- Height: 1.85 m (6 ft 1 in)
- Turned pro: 2004
- Plays: Right-handed (two-handed backhand)
- Coach: Christophe Lambert
- Prize money: $ 791,939

Singles
- Career record: 6–14
- Career titles: 0
- Highest ranking: No. 193 (11 November 2019)
- Current ranking: No. 1041 (9 June 2025)

Grand Slam singles results
- Australian Open: 1R (2019)
- French Open: Q2 (2016)
- Wimbledon: Q2 (2016)
- US Open: Q1 (2019)

Doubles
- Career record: 9–29
- Career titles: 0
- Highest ranking: No. 136 (28 February 2011)
- Current ranking: No. 1515 (9 June 2025)

Team competitions
- Davis Cup: 11–11
- Last updated on: 15 June 2025.

Li Zhe (Chinese: 李喆; pinyin: Lǐ Zhé; Mandarin pronunciation: [lì ʈʂɤ̌]; born September 20, 1986) is a Chinese tennis player who plays mainly on the ATP Challenger and ITF Futures Tours. On 11 November 2019, he reached his highest ATP singles ranking of world No. 193. His highest doubles ranking of No. 136 was achieved on 28 February 2011.

Li represents his native country of China competing during the Davis Cup. He competes in both singles, for which he has a record of 6–3, and doubles where his record is 5–8, for a combined total record of 11–11. He has reached 27 career singles finals, boasting a record of 14 wins and 13 losses, including a 0–2 record in ATP Challenger finals. Additionally he has reached a bountiful 81 doubles finals with a record of 53 wins and 28 losses, including a 6–7 record in ATP Challenger finals.

== Personal ==
Li Zhe was born in Tianjin, China and began playing tennis at age 8. He turned professional in 2004. He plays right-handed, and his favorite surface is hardcourt. His goal as a professional tennis player is to enter the top 100 ranked tennis players in the world.

== Career ==
In December 2018, Li defeated his compatriot Ze Zhang in three sets to win the 2019 Australian Open Asia-Pac Wildcard Play-off, which secured a wildcard place for him to make his Grand Slam singles debut at age 32 at the 2019 Australian Open.

He received a wildcard in doubles partnering Sun Fajing at the 2023 Rolex Shanghai Masters.

== ATP Challenger and ITF Futures Finals ==
=== Singles: 29 (16–13) ===
Legend (singles) ATP Challenger Tour (0–2) ITF Futures Tour (16–11)	Titles by surface Hard (16–13) Clay (0–0) Grass (0–0) Carpet (0–0)

Result	W–L	Date	Tournament	Tier	Surface	Opponent	Score
Loss	0–1	Apr 2008	China F3, Taizhou	Futures	Hard	(China) Gong Maoxin	4–6, 5–7
Win	1–1	Apr 2008	China F4, Taizhou	Futures	Hard	(Japan) Satoshi Iwabuchi	2–6, 7–5, 7–5
Win	2–1	Apr 2010	China F4, Guiyang	Futures	Hard	(China) Gong Maoxin	6–4, 6–3
Loss	2–2	Apr 2011	China F4, Chengdu	Futures	Hard	(South Korea) Im Kyu-tae	6–7^{(8–10)}, 1–6
Win	3–2	Jul 2011	Canada F3, Mississauga	Futures	Hard	(Canada) Steven Diez	6–2, 6–3
Win	4–2	May 2012	Israel F8, Ramat HaSharon	Futures	Hard	(China) Chang Yu	6–4, 7–5
Win	5–2	Jun 2012	China F9, Shenyang	Futures	Hard	(China) Wu Di	1–6, 7–6^{(7–3)}, 6–3
Win	6–2	Mar 2014	China F1, Guangzhou	Futures	Hard	(China) Bai Yan	6–7^{(4–7)}, 7–6^{(7–3)}, 6–1
Loss	6–3	Jun 2014	China F6, Putian	Futures	Hard	(China) Bai Yan	2–6, 1–6
Loss	6–4	Jul 2014	China F8, Shenzhen	Futures	Hard	(China) Bai Yan	6–4, 2–6, 1–6
Win	7–4	Jul 2014	China F9, Zhangjiagang	Futures	Hard	(Serbia) Nikola Milojević	6–2, 6–2
Loss	7–5	May 2015	China F5, Wuhan	Futures	Hard	(China) Wu Di	6–3, 4–6, 6–7^{(3–7)}
Win	8–5	May 2015	China F6, Wuhan	Futures	Hard	(China) Bai Yan	6–4, 6–3
Loss	8–6	Jun 2015	China F8, Zhangjiagang	Futures	Hard	(China) Wu Di	3–6, 7–6^{(7–2)}, 3–6
Win	9–6	Jul 2015	China F10, Xi'an	Futures	Hard	(China) Zhang Ze	6–2, 2–6, 6–4
Win	10–6	Jul 2015	China F11, Xi'an	Futures	Hard	(China) He Yecong	6–1, 6–1
Loss	10–7	Oct 2015	Australia F6, Alice Springs	Futures	Hard	(Czech Republic) Robin Staněk	2–6, 3–6
Loss	10–8	Jul 2016	China F10, Longyan	Futures	Hard	(South Korea) Lee Duck-hee	4–6, 4–6
Loss	10–9	Jan 2017	Bangkok, Thailand	Challenger	Hard	(Serbia) Janko Tipsarević	2–6, 3–6
Win	11–9	Apr 2017	China F4, Luzhou	Futures	Hard	(Japan) Shuichi Sekiguchi	6–3, 6–0
Loss	11–10	Jul 2017	China F10, Kunshan	Futures	Hard	(India) Prajnesh Gunneswaran	3–6, 1–6
Loss	11–11	Jul 2017	China F14, Tianjin	Futures	Hard	(Serbia) Nikola Milojević	4–6, 2–6
Win	12–11	Apr 2018	Japan F5, Kashiwa	Futures	Hard	(Japan) Yusuke Takahashi	6–4, 6–7^{(5–7)}, 7–5
Win	13–11	Jun 2018	China F7, Luzhou	Futures	Hard	(China) Wu Di	2–6, 6–2, 6–2
Win	14–11	Jun 2018	China F8, Yinchuan	Futures	Hard	(Thailand) Wishaya Trongcharoenchaikul	6–3, 6–3
Loss	14–12	Nov 2019	Shenzhen, China P.R.	Challenger	Hard	(China) Zhang Zhizhen	3–6, 6–4, 1–6
Loss	14–13	May 2022	M25 Monastir, Tunisia	World Tennis Tour	Hard	(Australia) Akira Santillan	6–2, 6–7^{(3−7)}, 2−6
Win	15–13	Jun 2023	M15 Tianjin, China	World Tennis Tour	Hard	(Chinese Taipei) Lee Kuan-yi	6–3, ret.
Win	16–13	Jul 2023	M15 Tianjin, China	World Tennis Tour	Hard	(China) Cui Jie	4–6, 7–6^{(8−6)}, 6−4

=== Doubles: 81 (53–28) ===
Legend (doubles) ATP Challenger Tour (6–7) ITF Futures Tour (47–21)	Titles by surface Hard (51–26) Clay (1–2) Grass (0–0) Carpet (1–0)

Result	W–L	Date	Tournament	Tier	Surface	Partner	Opponents	Score
Win	1–0	Jul 2005	China F4, Tianjin	Futures	Hard	(China) Wang Yu jr.	(Australia) David To (Australia) Marcus Walker	6–1, 6–2
Loss	1–1	Mar 2006	China F5, Guangzhou	Futures	Hard	(China) Xue Feng	(United States) James Cerretani (Netherlands) Jesse Huta Galung	6–4, 3–6, 6–7^{(3–7)}
Loss	1–2	Aug 2006	Italy F25, Imperia	Futures	Clay	(China) Wang Yu jr.	(Italy) Fabio Colangelo (Italy) Mattia Livraghi	4–6, 4–6
Loss	1–3	Aug 2006	Italy F27, Bolzano	Futures	Clay	(China) Wang Yu jr.	(Czech Republic) Dušan Karol (Spain) David Luque-Velasco	3–6, 5–7
Win	2–3	May 2007	China F2, Tianjin	Futures	Hard	(China) Gong Maoxin	(Chinese Taipei) Chang Huai-en (Chinese Taipei) Lee Hsin-han	6–3, 3–6, 6–1
Win	3–3	May 2007	China F3, Beijing	Futures	Hard	(China) Gong Maoxin	(Australia) Matthew Ebden (New Zealand) Jose Statham	0–6, 6–3, 7–5
Loss	3–4	Nov 2007	China F8, Wuxi	Futures	Hard	(China) Gong Maoxin	(Netherlands) Antal van der Duim (Netherlands) Boy Westerhof	6–7^{(5–7)}, 4–6
Loss	3–5	Mar 2008	Japan F1, Tokyo	Futures	Hard	(China) Gong Maoxin	(Japan) Hiroki Kondo (Japan) Hiroyasu Sato	6–3, 6–7^{(3–7)}, [2–10]
Win	4–5	Apr 2008	Japan F3, Kōfu	Futures	Hard	(China) Gong Maoxin	(New Zealand) G.D. Jones (New Zealand) Daniel King-Turner	6–1, 7–5
Loss	4–6	May 2008	Korea Rep. F4, Seogwipo	Futures	Hard	(China) Gong Maoxin	(Japan) Yaoki Ishii (Japan) Hiroki Kondo	4–6, 5–7
Win	5–6	Jun 2008	Japan F6, Akishima	Futures	Carpet	(China) Gong Maoxin	(China) Wang Yu jr. (China) Xu Junchao	6–4, 3–6, [10–7]
Win	6–6	Jul 2008	Japan F7, Ariake	Futures	Hard	(China) Gong Maoxin	(United States) Minh Le (Chinese Taipei) Lee Hsin-han	6–2, 6–1
Win	7–6	Sep 2008	Japan F8, Osaka	Futures	Hard	(China) Gong Maoxin	(Japan) Hiroki Kondo (Japan) Hiroyasu Sato	6–4, 6–3
Loss	7–7	Jan 2009	China F1, Guangzhou	Futures	Hard	(China) Wang Yu jr.	(Chinese Taipei) Lee Hsin-han (Chinese Taipei) Yang Tsung-hua	0–6, 3–6
Loss	7–8	Apr 2009	Korea Rep. F1, Daegu	Futures	Hard	(South Korea) Kim Young-jun	(New Zealand) G.D. Jones (New Zealand) Daniel King-Turner	2–6, 4–6
Loss	7–9	Apr 2009	Korea Rep. F2, Seogwipo	Futures	Hard	(France) Clément Reix	(Japan) Satoshi Iwabuchi (Japan) Gouichi Motomura	3–6, 2–6
Win	8–9	Apr 2009	Korea Rep. F3, Changwon	Futures	Hard	(China) Wang Yu jr.	(Sweden) Ervin Eleskovic (Denmark) Frederik Nielsen	6–2, 6–3
Loss	8–10	May 2009	Korea Rep. F4, Gimcheon	Futures	Hard	(China) Wang Yu jr.	(New Zealand) G.D. Jones (New Zealand) Daniel King-Turner	4–6, 1–6
Win	9–10	Aug 2009	China F7, Ningbo	Futures	Hard	(China) Wang Yu jr.	(China) Gong Maoxin (China) Xue Feng	4–6, 6–1, [10–6]
Loss	9–11	Sep 2009	Australia F6, Darwin	Futures	Hard	(China) Wang Yu jr.	(Australia) Kaden Hensel (Australia) Adam Hubble	4–6, 3–6
Loss	9–12	Feb 2010	Azerbaijan F1, Baku	Futures	Hard (i)	(China) Gong Maoxin	(Romania) Petru-Alexandru Luncanu (Netherlands) Matwé Middelkoop	7–6^{(9–7)}, 3–6, [10–12]
Loss	9–13	Apr 2010	China F3, Chongqing	Futures	Hard	(China) Gong Maoxin	(China) Wu Di (China) Zhang Ze	3–6, 6–1, [8–10]
Win	10–13	Apr 2010	China F4, Guiyang	Futures	Hard	(China) Gong Maoxin	(Chinese Taipei) Chang Yao-lun (South Korea) Daniel Yoo	5–7, 6–3, [10–4]
Loss	10–14	Apr 2010	Korea F3, Changwon	Futures	Hard	(China) Gong Maoxin	(Austria) Nikolaus Moser (Austria) Max Raditschnigg	2–6, 6–2, [5–10]
Loss	10–15	May 2010	Fergana, Uzbekistan	Challenger	Hard	(China) Gong Maoxin	(United States) Brendan Evans (Japan) Toshihide Matsui	6–3, 3–6, [8–10]
Win	11–15	Jun 2010	China F5, Wuhan	Futures	Hard	(China) Gong Maoxin	(China) Ma Yanan (China) Yu Xinyuan	7–5, 6–3
Win	12–15	Jun 2010	China F6, Jiaxing	Futures	Hard	(China) Gong Maoxin	(China) Gao Peng (China) Gao Wan	6–4, 6–3
Win	13–15	Aug 2010	Karshi, Uzbekistan	Challenger	Hard	(China) Gong Maoxin	(India) Divij Sharan (India) Vishnu Vardhan	6–3, 6–1
Win	14–15	Sep 2010	Bangkok, Thailand	Challenger	Hard	(China) Gong Maoxin	(India) Yuki Bhambri (United States) Ryler DeHeart	6–3, 6–4
Win	15–15	Oct 2010	China F8, Shanghai	Futures	Hard	(China) Gong Maoxin	(Finland) Harri Heliövaara (New Zealand) Jose Statham	7–6^{(7–3)}, 7–6^{(8–6)}
Win	16–15	Jan 2011	China F1, Mengzi	Futures	Hard	(China) Gong Maoxin	(Chinese Taipei) Lee Hsin-han (Chinese Taipei) Yi Chu-huan	6–1, 6–1
Win	17–15	Jan 2011	China F2, Mengzi	Futures	Hard	(China) Gong Maoxin	(Chinese Taipei) Lee Hsin-han (Chinese Taipei) Yi Chu-huan	4–6, 6–3, [10–4]
Win	18–15	Apr 2011	China F3, Chengdu	Futures	Hard	(China) Gong Maoxin	(Chinese Taipei) Chen Ti (China) Xu Junchao	6–0, 6–3
Win	19–15	Apr 2011	China F4, Chengdu	Futures	Hard	(China) Gong Maoxin	(South Korea) Im Kyu-tae (Japan) Hiroki Kondo	6–3, 7–6^{(7–4)}
Win	20–15	Jun 2011	China F7, Shenzhen	Futures	Hard	(China) Gong Maoxin	(South Korea) Jun Woong-sun (South Korea) Daniel Yoo	6–0, 6–3
Win	21–15	Jun 2011	China F8, Huizhou	Futures	Hard	(China) Gong Maoxin	(China) Gao Peng (China) Gao Wan	6–4, 6–2
Win	22–15	Jul 2011	Canada F3, Mississauga	Futures	Hard	(China) Gong Maoxin	(United States) Peter Aarts (Canada) Daniel Chu	6–4, 7–6^{(7–1)}
Win	23–15	Oct 2011	Indonesia F4, Jakarta	Futures	Hard	(Chinese Taipei) Yi Chu-huan	(India) Yuki Bhambri (India) Rohan Gajjar	6–3, 6–2
Win	24–15	Nov 2011	Thailand F5, Phuket	Futures	Hard (i)	(Canada) Kelsey Stevenson	(Thailand) Weerapat Doakmaiklee (Thailand) Kirati Siributwong	6–4, 4–6, [10–3]
Win	25–15	Apr 2012	China F5, Chengdu	Futures	Hard	(China) Gao Xin	(China) Chang Yu (China) Wu Di	2–2 ret.
Win	26–15	May 2012	Israel F7, Ashkelon	Futures	Hard	(China) Chang Yu	(Israel) Saar Steele (Israel) Amir Weintraub	6–3, 6–2
Win	27–15	May 2012	China F8, Fuzhou	Futures	Hard	(China) Gao Xin	(Japan) Takuto Niki (Japan) Arata Onozawa	6–2, 6–3
Win	28–15	Jul 2012	China F10, Shenyang	Futures	Hard	(China) Gao Xin	(Chinese Taipei) Huang Liang-chi (Chinese Taipei) Yi Chu-huan	6–4, 7–5
Win	29–15	Dec 2012	Hong Kong F2, Hong Kong	Futures	Hard	(China) Chang Yu	(China) Gao Peng (Sweden) Patrik Rosenholm	6–4, 6–4
Loss	29–16	Feb 2013	Turkey F6, Antalya	Futures	Hard	(China) Chang Yu	(Chinese Taipei) Chen Ti (Japan) Hiroki Kondo	0–6, 2–6
Win	30–16	Feb 2013	Turkey F7, Antalya	Futures	Hard	(China) Chang Yu	(Croatia) Mate Delić (Serbia) Ilija Vučić	7–5, 3–6, [11–9]
Win	31–16	May 2013	China F4, Fuzhou	Futures	Hard	(China) Gao Xin	(China) Gao Peng (China) Gao Wan	6–4, 2–6, [12–10]
Win	32–16	Mar 2014	China F3, Yuxi	Futures	Hard	(China) Wu Di	(South Korea) Lim Yong-kyu (South Korea) Nam Ji-sung	6–4, 6–4
Win	33–16	Apr 2014	China F4, Chengdu	Futures	Hard	(China) Gong Maoxin	(Chinese Taipei) Huang Liang-chi (Chinese Taipei) Hung Jui-chen	6–3, 6–4
Win	34–16	Apr 2014	China F5, Chengdu	Futures	Hard	(China) Gong Maoxin	(Russia) Victor Baluda (Belarus) Ilya Ivashka	0–1 ret.
Win	35–16	May 2014	Thailand F4, Bangkok	Futures	Hard	(Indonesia) Christopher Rungkat	(Thailand) Phassawit Burapharitta (Thailand) Grittaboon Prahmanee	6–0, 6–1
Win	36–16	Jun 2014	China F6, Putian	Futures	Hard	(China) Gong Maoxin	(Chinese Taipei) Peng Hsien-yin (Chinese Taipei) Yang Tsung-hua	6–1, 6–3
Loss	36–17	Jan 2015	Turkey F2, Antalya	Futures	Hard	(South Korea) Kim Cheong-eui	(Ukraine) Artem Smirnov (Ukraine) Volodymyr Uzhylovskyi	3–6, 0–6
Loss	36–18	Jan 2015	Turkey F3, Antalya	Futures	Hard	(South Africa) Ruan Roelofse	(Austria) Lucas Miedler (Austria) Maximilian Neuchrist	4–6, 4–6
Win	37–18	Feb 2015	Turkey F4, Antalya	Futures	Hard	(South Africa) Ruan Roelofse	(Germany) Jan Choinski (Germany) Kevin Krawietz	6–3, 4–6, [10–2]
Win	38–18	Mar 2015	Japan F3, Kōfu	Futures	Hard	(China) Gao Xin	(Japan) Takashi Saito (Japan) Yusuke Watanuki	6–0, 6–7^{(4–7)}, [10–1]
Win	39–18	Apr 2015	China F4, Yuxi	Futures	Hard	(China) Gao Xin	(South Korea) Kim Cheong-eui (Netherlands) Boy Westerhof	6–4, 6–4
Win	40–18	May 2015	China F6, Wuhan	Futures	Hard	(China) Gao Xin	(China) Bai Yan (Japan) Arata Onozawa	7–5, 6–3
Win	41–18	Jun 2015	Gimcheon, Korea, Rep.	Challenger	Hard	(New Zealand) Jose Statham	(South Africa) Dean O'Brien (South Africa) Ruan Roelofse	6–4, 6–2
Win	42–18	Jul 2015	China F10, Xi'an	Futures	Hard	(India) Sriram Balaji	(China) Bai Yan (Chinese Taipei) Chen Ti	4–6, 7–6^{(7–2)}, [13–11]
Loss	42–19	Jul 2015	China F11, Xi'an	Futures	Hard	(India) Sriram Balaji	(China) Bai Yan (Chinese Taipei) Hsieh Cheng-peng	7–6^{(7–4)}, 3–6, [7–10]
Loss	42–20	Sep 2015	Bangkok, Thailand	Challenger	Hard	(Chinese Taipei) Chen Ti	(China) Bai Yan (Italy) Riccardo Ghedin	2–6, 5–7
Win	43–20	Oct 2015	Australia F6, Alice Springs	Futures	Hard	(China) Gao Xin	(Australia) Alex Bolt (Australia) Jordan Thompson	3–6, 6–3, [10–1]
Win	44–20	Oct 2015	Australia F7, Cairns	Futures	Hard	(China) Gao Xin	(New Zealand) Finn Tearney (Japan) Yusuke Watanuki	6–1, 6–2
Win	45–20	May 2016	Rome, Italy	Challenger	Clay	(China) Bai Yan	(Netherlands) Sander Arends (Austria) Tristan-Samuel Weissborn	6–3, 3–6, [11–9]
Win	46–20	Jul 2016	China F10, Longyan	Futures	Hard	(China) Bai Yan	(China) Sun Fajing (China) Wang Aoran	7–6^{(7–1)}, 6–4
Loss	46–21	Aug 2016	Chengdu, China, P.R.	Challenger	Hard	(China) Gao Xin	(China) Gong Maoxin (China) Zhang Ze	3–6, 6–4, [11–13]
Loss	46–22	Sep 2016	Shanghai, China, P.R.	Challenger	Hard	(China) Gao Xin	(Chinese Taipei) Hsieh Cheng-peng (Chinese Taipei) Yi Chu-huan	6–7^{(6–8)}, 7–5, [0–10]
Win	47–22	Apr 2017	China F4, Luzhou	Futures	Hard	(China) Gao Xin	(Chinese Taipei) Peng Hsien-yin (Chinese Taipei) Jimmy Wang	4–6, 6–3, [10–6]
Loss	47–23	May 2017	China F7, Wuhan	Futures	Hard	(China) Gao Xin	(Japan) Shintaro Imai (Japan) Kaichi Uchida	6–4, 4–6, [8–10]
Win	48–23	Jul 2017	China F10, Kunshan	Futures	Hard	(China) Gao Xin	(China) He Yecong (China) Zhang Zhizhen	6–3, 6–2
Win	49–23	Jul 2017	China F11, Shenzhen	Futures	Hard	(China) Gao Xin	(China) Wu Hao (China) Xia Zihao	7–6^{(7–4)}, 6–2
Win	50–23	Oct 2017	Australia F6, Toowoomba	Futures	Hard	(Australia) Bradley Mousley	(United States) Nathan Pasha (Australia) Darren Polkinghorne	6–4, 7–6^{(7–4)}
Win	51–23	Jul 2018	Granby, Canada	Challenger	Hard	(United States) Alex Lawson	(United States) JC Aragone (United Kingdom) Liam Broady	7–6^{(7–2)}, 6–3
Loss	51–24	Nov 2018	Kobe, Japan	Challenger	Hard (i)	(Japan) Go Soeda	(Portugal) Gonçalo Oliveira (Australia) Akira Santillan	6–2, 4–6, [10–12]
Win	52–24	Feb 2019	Bangkok, Thailand	Challenger	Hard	(Portugal) Gonçalo Oliveira	(Spain) Enrique López Pérez (Japan) Hiroki Moriya	6–2, 6–1
Loss	52–25	Mar 2019	Shenzhen, China, P.R.	Challenger	Hard	(Portugal) Gonçalo Oliveira	(Chinese Taipei) Hsieh Cheng-peng (Indonesia) Christopher Rungkat	4–6, 6–3, [6–10]
Loss	52–26	Jul 2019	Granby, Canada	Challenger	Hard	(France) Hugo Nys	(Sweden) Andre Goransson (Netherlands) Sem Verbeek	2–6, 4–6
Loss	52–27	Apr 2022	M15 Monastir, Tunisia	World Tennis Tour	Hard	(China) Bu Yunchaokete	(United Kingdom) Charles Broom (Germany) Constantin Franzen	5–7, 6–2, [8–10]
Loss	52–28	May 2022	M15 Monastir, Tunisia	World Tennis Tour	Hard	(China) Gao Xin	(Tunisia) Skander Mansouri (Australia) Akira Santillan	3–6, 0–6
Win	53–28	Jun 2022	M15 San Diego, United States	World Tennis Tour	Hard	(Chinese Taipei) Yang Tsung-Hua	(United States) Ethan Quinn (United States) Siem Woldeab	6–4, 3–6, [10−8]

== Performance timeline ==
Key
W	F	SF	QF	#R	RR	Q#	DNQ	A	NH

(W) winner; (F) finalist; (SF) semifinalist; (QF) quarterfinalist; (#R) rounds 4, 3, 2, 1; (RR) round-robin stage; (Q#) qualification round; (DNQ) did not qualify; (A) absent; (NH) not held; (SR) strike rate (events won / competed); (W–L) win–loss record.
To avoid confusion and double counting, these charts are updated at the conclusion of a tournament or when the player's participation has ended.

=== Singles ===
Tournament	2016	2017	2018	2019	2020	2021	2022	SR	W–L	Win %
Grand Slam tournaments
Australian Open	Q1	A	A	1R	Q3	Q2	A	0 / 1	0–1	0%
French Open	Q2	A	A	Q1	A	A	A	0 / 0	0–0	–
Wimbledon	Q2	A	A	Q1	NH	A	A	0 / 0	0–0	–
US Open	A	A	A	Q1	A	A	A	0 / 0	0–0	–
Win–loss	0–0	0–0	0–0	0–1	0–0	0–0	0–0	0 / 1	0–1	0%

== Rankings ==
=== Year end ATP rankings ===
Year	Singles	Doubles
2012	385	359
2011	374	181
2010	449	146
2009	753	396
2008	552	548
2007	894	600
2006	968	453
2005	1187	666
2004	n/a	n/a

== Sponsorship ==
In November 2010, Zhe Li signed as a spokesperson for Dunlop Sport, after gaining recognition as the captain of the Chinese national men's tennis team and winning the China Tennis Grand Prix men's doubles title.
