= 2018 Bendigo Women's International =

- Date: 22–28 October
- Edition: 12th
- Category: ITF Women's Circuit
- Prize money: $60,000
- Surface: Hard
- Location: Bendigo, Australia

Champions

Singles
- (Australia) Priscilla Hon

Doubles
- (Australia) Ellen Perez / (Australia) Arina Rodionova
← 2017 ·	Bendigo Women's International	· 2019 →

The 2018 Bendigo Women's International was a professional tennis tournament played on outdoor hard courts. It was the twelfth edition of the tournament and was part of the 2018 ITF Women's Circuit. It took place in Bendigo, Australia, on 22–28 October 2018.

== Singles main draw entrants ==
=== Seeds ===
Country	Player	Rank^{1}	Seed
AUS	Arina Rodionova	163	1
AUS	Olivia Rogowska	166	2
GBR	Gabriella Taylor	172	3
AUS	Priscilla Hon	188	4
AUS	Jaimee Fourlis	204	5
AUS	Destanee Aiava	223	6
AUS	Ellen Perez	226	7
AUS	Lizette Cabrera	228	8

- ^{1} Rankings as of 15 October 2018.

=== Other entrants ===
The following players received a wildcard into the singles main draw:

- (Australia) Samantha Harris
- (Australia) Sara Tomic

The following players received entry from the qualifying draw:

- (United Kingdom) Jodie Anna Burrage
- (Italy) Verena Meliss
- (France) Marine Partaud
- (Australia) Astra Sharma

== Champions ==
=== Singles ===
- (Australia) Priscilla Hon def. (Australia) Ellen Perez, 6–4, 4–6, 7–5

=== Doubles ===
- (Australia) Ellen Perez / (Australia) Arina Rodionova def. (Japan) Eri Hozumi / (Japan) Risa Ozaki, 7–5, 6–1
