= Zoe Hives =

Australian tennis player

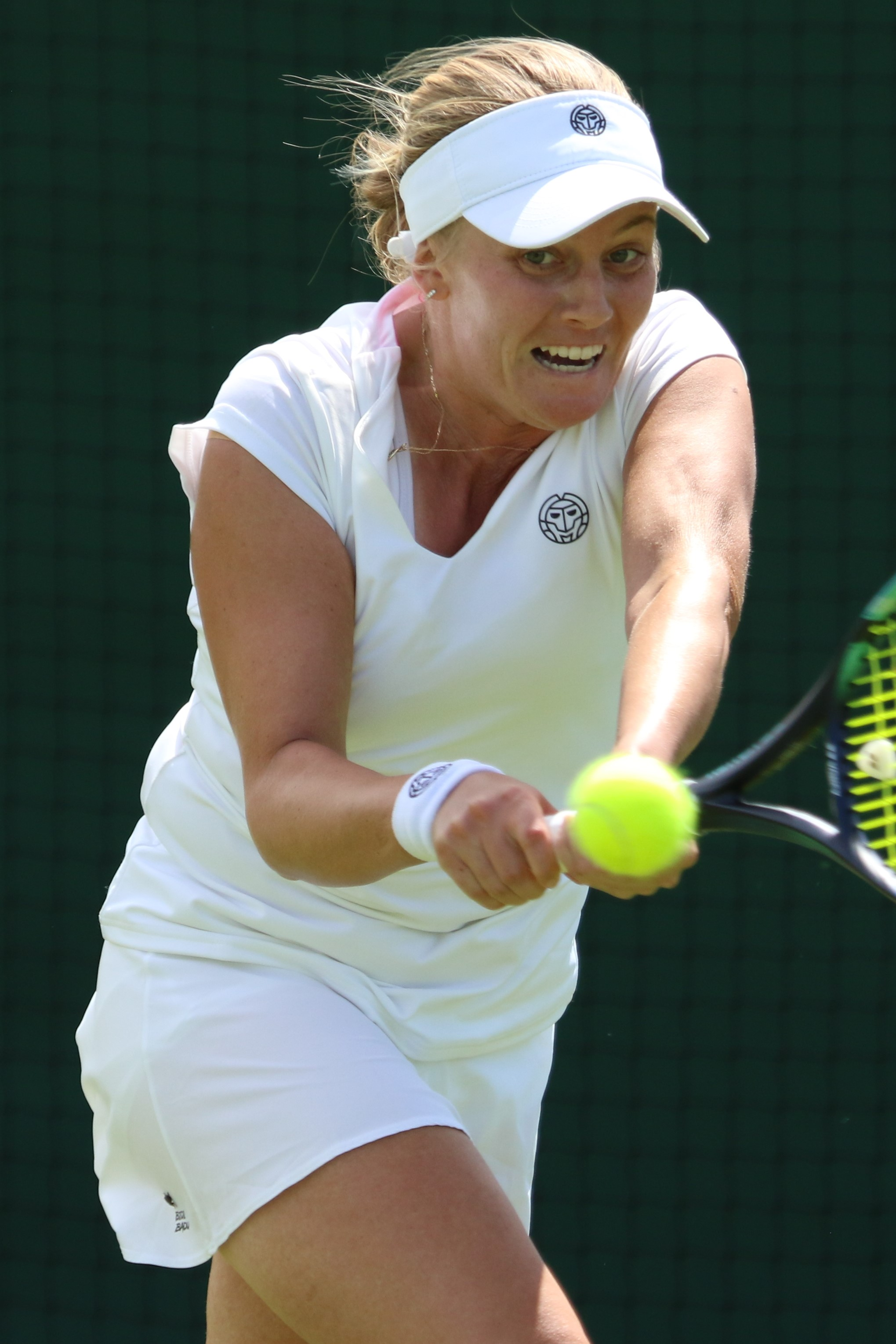
- Hives at the 2022 Wimbledon Championships
- Country (sports): Australia
- Residence: Kingston, Australia
- Born: 24 October 1996 (age 30) Ballarat, Australia
- Retired: 2024
- Plays: Right-handed (two-handed backhand)
- Prize money: $348,210

Singles
- Career record: 132–90
- Career titles: 4 ITF
- Highest ranking: No. 140 (14 October 2019)

Grand Slam singles results
- Australian Open: 2R (2019)
- Wimbledon: 1R (2022)
- US Open: Q2 (2019)

Doubles
- Career record: 30–41
- Career titles: 1 WTA, 2 ITF
- Highest ranking: No. 144 (6 May 2019)

Grand Slam doubles results
- Australian Open: 2R (2019)

Zoe Hives (born 24 October 1996) is a former professional Australian tennis player.

She has career-high WTA rankings of 140 in singles and 144 in doubles, both achieved in 2019. Hives has won four singles and two doubles titles on the ITF Women's Circuit.

In November 2017, she won her most important doubles career title at the 2017 Bendigo Women's International, partnering Alison Bai. This resulted in them being awarded a wildcard into the Australian Open.

Hives is coached by Michael Logarzo and based in Melbourne.

== Career ==
=== 2019: Major debut and first win ===
In January, Hives was awarded a wildcard into the Australian Open and defeated Bethanie Mattek-Sands in round one – her first ever Grand Slam main-draw win. She lost to Caroline Garcia in the second round.

=== 2022: Wimbledon debut ===
In January 2022, Hives played her first professional match since September 2019 and made the second round of the 2022 Australian Open – Women's singles qualifying.

She entered into the main draw, using protected ranking in the qualifying competition, making her major debut at the 2022 Wimbledon Championships.

== Grand Slam performance timeline ==
Key
| W | F | SF | QF | #R | RR | Q# | DNQ | A | NH |

(W) winner; (F) finalist; (SF) semifinalist; (QF) quarterfinalist; (#R) rounds 4, 3, 2, 1; (RR) round-robin stage; (Q#) qualification round; (DNQ) did not qualify; (A) absent; (NH) not held; (SR) strike rate (events won / competed); (W–L) win–loss record.
To avoid confusion and double counting, these charts are updated at the conclusion of a tournament or when the player's participation has ended.

=== Singles ===
| Tournament | 2016 | ... | 2019 | ... | 2022 | 2023 | SR | W–L |
|---|---|---|---|---|---|---|---|---|
| Australian Open | Q1 | | 2R | | Q2 | Q2 | 0 / 1 | 1–1 |
| French Open | A | | A | | A | A | 0 / 0 | 0–0 |
| Wimbledon | A | | Q2 | | 1R | A | 0 / 1 | 0–1 |
| US Open | A | | Q2 | | A | A | 0 / 0 | 0–0 |
| Win–Loss | 0–0 | | 1–1 | | 0–1 | 0–0 | 0 / 2 | 1–2 |

== WTA Tour finals ==
=== Doubles: 1 (title) ===
| Legend WTA 250 (1–0) | Finals by surface Clay (1–0) |

| Result | Date | Tournament | Tier | Surface | Partner | Opponents | Score |
|---|---|---|---|---|---|---|---|
| Win | Apr 2019 | Copa Colsanitas, Colombia | International (Note: The WTA International tournaments were reclassified as WTA 250 tournaments in 2021.) | Clay | (Australia) Astra Sharma | (United States) Hayley Carter (United States) Ena Shibahara | 6–1, 6–2 |

== ITF Circuit finals ==
=== Singles: 5 (4 titles, 1 runner-up) ===
| Legend $60,000 tournaments $25,000 tournaments $15,000 tournaments | Finals by surface Hard (3–1) Clay (1–0) |

| Result | W–L | Date | Tournament | Tier | Surface | Opponent | Score |
|---|---|---|---|---|---|---|---|
| Win | 1–0 | Apr 2015 | ITF Melbourne, Australia | 15,000 | Clay | (Australia) Sally Peers | 7–5, 6–2 |
| Win | 2–0 | Jan 2018 | Playford International, Australia | 25,000 | Hard | (Australia) Alexandra Bozovic | 6–4, 5–7, 7–6^{(7–4)} |
| Win | 3–0 | Oct 2018 | ITF Toowoomba, Australia | 25,000 | Hard | (Australia) Ellen Perez | 6–0, 6–2 |
| Win | 4–0 | Nov 2018 | Canberra International, Australia | 60,000 | Hard | (Australia) Olivia Rogowska | 6–4, 6–2 |
| Loss | 4–1 | Jul 2019 | Ashland Tennis Classic, United States | 60,000 | Hard | (Australia) Ellen Perez | 2–6, 2–3 ret. |

=== Doubles: 2 (2 titles) ===
| Legend $60,000 tournaments $25,000 tournaments | Finals by surface Hard (2–0) |

| Result | W–L | Date | Tournament | Tier | Surface | Partner | Opponents | Score |
|---|---|---|---|---|---|---|---|---|
| Win | 1–0 | Nov 2017 | Bendigo International, Australia | 60,000 | Hard | (Australia) Alison Bai | (United States) Asia Muhammad (Australia) Arina Rodionova | 4–6, 6–4, [10–8] |
| Win | 2–0 | Jun 2018 | ITF Singapore | 25,000 | Hard | (Australia) Olivia Tjandramulia | (Japan) Miyabi Inoue (Japan) Junri Namigata | 6–4, 4–6, [10–6] |
