= Kaylah McPhee =

Australian tennis player (born 1998)

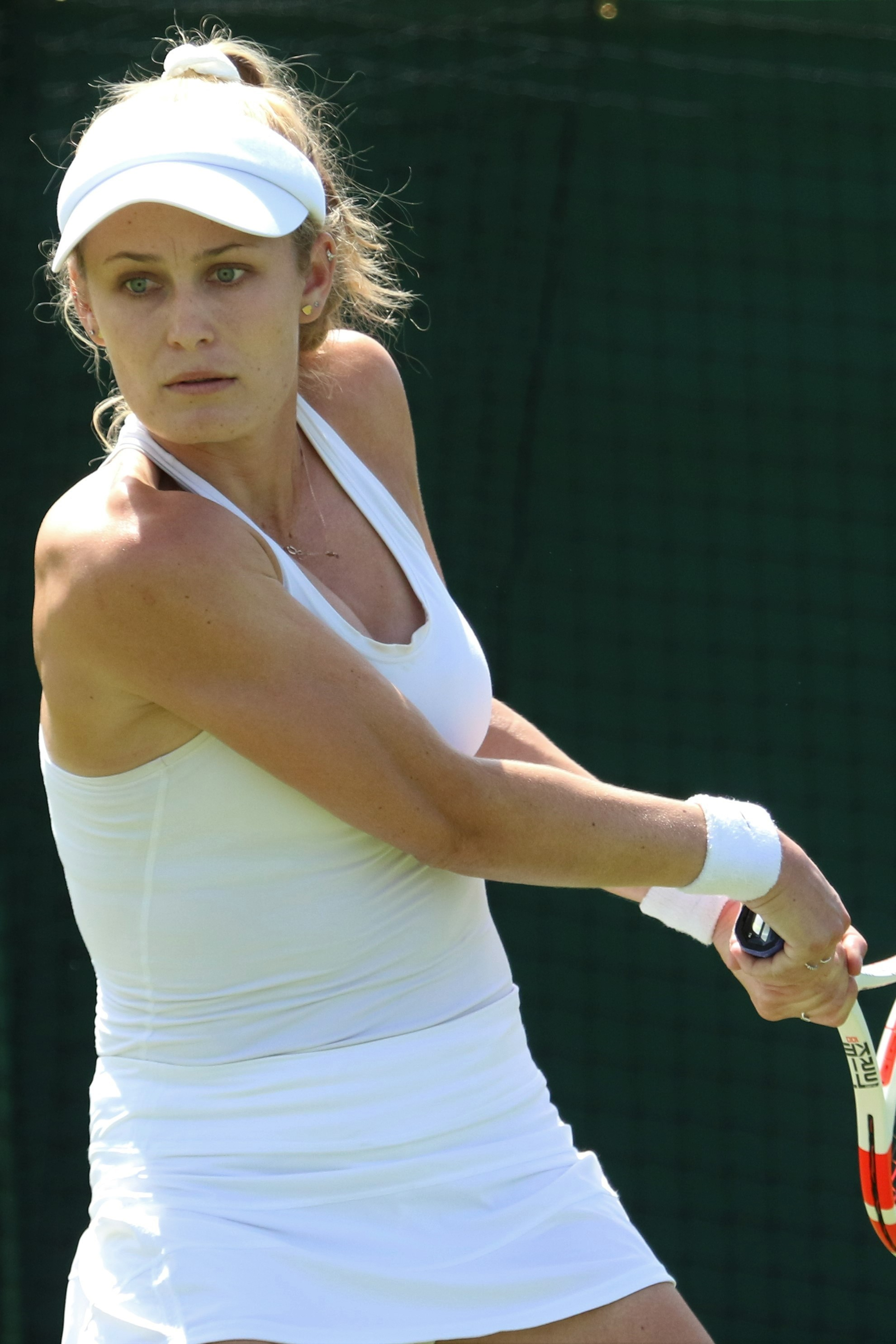
- McPhee at the 2022 Wimbledon Championships
- Country (sports): Australia
- Residence: Brisbane, Australia
- Born: 4 February 1998 (age 28) Brisbane
- Height: 1.67 m (5 ft 6 in)
- Plays: Right (two-handed backhand)
- Prize money: $266,692

Singles
- Career record: 191–175
- Career titles: 1 ITF
- Highest ranking: No. 199 (16 September 2019)

Grand Slam singles results
- Australian Open: Q2 (2019)
- Wimbledon: Q2 (2019)
- US Open: Q1 (2019)

Doubles
- Career record: 92–96
- Career titles: 4 ITF
- Highest ranking: No. 218 (29 January 2024)
- Current ranking: No. 1,456 (26 October 2026)

Grand Slam doubles results
- Australian Open: 2R (2020)

Kaylah McPhee (born 4 February 1998) is an Australian inactive tennis player.

She has career-high WTA rankings of 199 in singles, achieved on 16 September 2019, and 218 in doubles, reached on 29 January 2024. She has won one singles and four doubles titles on the ITF Women's Circuit.

McPhee won her biggest ITF title at the 2019 Bendigo Women's International in the doubles event, partnering Maddison Inglis.

Alongside Astra Sharma, she was runner-up in the doubles at the WTA 125 2024 Canberra Tennis International, losing to Veronika Erjavec and Darja Semeņistaja in the final.

== WTA 125 finals ==
=== Doubles: 1 (runner-up) ===
Result	Date	Tournament	Surface	Partner	Opponents	Score
Loss	Jan 2024	Canberra International, Australia	Hard	(Australia) Astra Sharma	(Slovenia) Veronika Erjavec (Latvia) Darja Semeņistaja	2–6, 4–6

== ITF Circuit finals ==
=== Singles: 6 (1 title, 5 runner-ups) ===
Legend W60 tournaments (0–1) W25 tournaments (0–1) W15 tournaments (1–3)	Finals by surface Hard (0–1) Clay (1–3) Grass (0–1)

Result	W–L	Date	Tournament	Tier	Surface	Opponent	Score
Loss	0–1	Mar 2019	ITF Mildura, Australia	W25	Grass	(Australia) Naiktha Bains	4–6, 7–6^{(5)}, 2–6
Loss	0–2	Sep 2019	Jinan International, China	W60	Hard	(China) You Xiaodi	3–6, 6–7^{(5)}
Loss	0–3	Apr 2023	ITF Telde, Spain	W15	Clay	(Spain) Paula Arias Manjón	5–7, 4–6
Loss	0–4	Jun 2024	ITF Kuršumlijska Banja, Serbia	W15	Clay	(Sweden) Caijsa Hennemann	6–2, 4–6, 1–6
Loss	0–5	Nov 2024	ITF Ribeirão Preto, Brazil	W15	Clay	(Brazil) Luiza Fullana	4–6, 5–7
Win	1–5	Dec 2024	ITF Joinville, Brazil	W15	Clay (i)	(Argentina) Victoria Bosio	6–3, 6–4

=== Doubles: 11 (4 titles, 7 runner-ups) ===
Legend W60 tournaments (1–3) W25/35 tournaments (2–3) W10/15 tournaments (1–1)	Finals by surface Hard (2–3) Clay (2–4)

Result	W–L	Date	Tournament	Tier	Surface	Partner	Opponents	Score
Loss	0–1	Jul 2016	ITF Hong Kong, China SAR	W10	Hard	(Australia) Alexandra Bozovic	(Hong Kong) Eudice Chong (Hong Kong) Katherine Ip	2–6, 2–6
Win	1–1	Apr 2018	Clay Court International, Australia	W25	Clay	(Romania) Irina Fetecău	(Austria) Pia König (Japan) Michika Ozeki	6–1, 4–6, [10–5]
Win	2–1	Oct 2018	Brisbane QTC International, Australia	W25	Hard	(Australia) Maddison Inglis	(India) Rutuja Bhosale (China) Xu Shilin	7–5, 6–4
Loss	2–2	Apr 2019	ITF Hong Kong, China SAR	W25	Hard (i) (Note: Tournament is an outdoor event, but rain caused the doubles final to be postponed from 13 April and then transferred to an indoor court.)	(Australia) Maddison Inglis	(New Zealand) Paige Hourigan (Indonesia) Aldila Sutjiadi	3–6, 1–6
Win	3–2	Oct 2019	Bendigo International, Australia	W60	Hard	(Australia) Maddison Inglis	(United Kingdom) Naiktha Bains (Slovakia) Tereza Mihalikova	3–6, 6–2, [10–2]
Loss	3–3	Apr 2023	Koper Open, Slovenia	W60	Clay	(Netherlands) Suzan Lamens	(Romania) Irina Bara (Romania) Andreea Mitu	2–6, 3–6
Win	4–3	Apr 2023	ITF Telde, Spain	W15	Clay	(Switzerland) Marie Mettraux	(Slovakia) Irina Balus (Lithuania) Patricija Paukštytė	7–5, 6–2
Loss	4–4	May 2023	Prague Open, Czech Republic	W60	Clay	(Czech Republic) Aneta Kučmová	(Poland) Maja Chwalińska (Czech Republic) Jesika Malečková	0–6, 6–7^{(5)}
Loss	4–5	Oct 2023	Playford International, Australia	W60	Hard	(Australia) Astra Sharma	(Australia) Talia Gibson (Australia) Priscilla Hon	1–6, 2–6
Loss	4–6	Apr 2024	ITF Hammamet, Tunisia	W35	Hard	(Colombia) María Herazo González	(Czech Republic) Julie Štruplová (Russia) Ksenia Zaytseva	4–6, 4–6, [4–10]
Loss	4–7	May 2024	ITF Klagenfurt, Austria	W35	Clay	(Slovakia) Nina Vargová	(Czech Republic) Aneta Kučmová (Slovenia) Nika Radišić	3–6, 5–7
