= 2013 Bendigo Women's International (2) – Doubles =

Doubles
- 2013 Bendigo Women's International (2)

Final
- Champions: (Australia) Monique Adamczak (Australia) Olivia Rogowska
- Runners-up: (Australia) Stephanie Bengson (Australia) Sally Peers
- Score: 6–3, 2–6, [11–9]

Events
Singles	Doubles
← 2012 ·	Bendigo Women's International (2)	· 2014 →

This is the doubles draw for the second Bendigo Women's International of 2013.

Monique Adamczak and Olivia Rogowska won the tournament, defeating Stephanie Bengson and Sally Peers in the all-Australian final, 6–3, 2–6, [11–9].

== Seeds ==
1. (Thailand) Noppawan Lertcheewakarn / (Russia) Arina Rodionova (first round)
2. (Australia) Monique Adamczak / (Australia) Olivia Rogowska (champions)
3. (Australia) Stephanie Bengson / (Australia) Sally Peers (final)
4. (Australia) Viktorija Rajicic / (Slovakia) Zuzana Zlochová (quarterfinals)

== Draw ==
=== Key ===
- Q = Qualifier
- WC = Wild card
- LL = Lucky loser
- Alt = Alternate
- SE = Special exempt
- PR = Protected ranking
- ITF = ITF entry
- JE = Junior exempt
- w/o = Walkover
- r = Retired
- d = Defaulted
- SR = Special ranking

First round
1	(Thailand) N Lertcheewakarn (Russia) A Rodionova	2	6	[8]
(Australia) N Collie (Croatia) E Mikulčić	6	3	[10]
(Australia) A Hadzic (Australia) J Moore	6	6
Q	(Australia) S Bollweg (Australia) M Rajicic	0	3
3	(Australia) S Bengson (Australia) S Peers	6	6
(Australia) N Hoynaski (Australia) A Keir	1	3
(Australia) A Bai (Japan) S Ishizu	6	6
Q	(Australia) N Bains (Australia) A Sumner	2	1
(Australia) T Patterson (Australia) E Perez	1	4
(Belgium) Y Bonaventure (Estonia) A Kontaveit	6	6
(Australia) N Baric (Australia) J Karaitiana	2	5
4	(Australia) V Rajicic (Slovakia) Z Zlochová	6	7
(New Zealand) E Hayman (Czech Republic) P Krejsová	3	6	[9]
(Australia) T Calderwood (New Zealand) D Hollands	6	0	[11]
(Australia) K Wlodarczak (Thailand) Varu Wongteanchai	0	1
2	(Australia) M Adamczak (Australia) O Rogowska	6	6

Quarterfinals
(Australia) N Collie (Croatia) E Mikulčić	6	6
(Australia) A Hadzic (Australia) J Moore	2	4
3	(Australia) S Bengson (Australia) S Peers	6	6
(Australia) A Bai (Japan) S Ishizu	2	2
(Belgium) Y Bonaventure (Estonia) A Kontaveit	6	7^{7}
4	(Australia) V Rajicic (Slovakia) Z Zlochová	2	6^{5}
(Australia) T Calderwood (New Zealand) D Hollands	6	1	[7]
2	(Australia) M Adamczak (Australia) O Rogowska	3	6	[10]

Semifinals
(Australia) N Collie (Croatia) E Mikulčić	4	4
3	(Australia) S Bengson (Australia) S Peers	6	6
(Belgium) Y Bonaventure (Estonia) A Kontaveit	4	4
2	(Australia) M Adamczak (Australia) O Rogowska	6	6

Final
3	(Australia) S Bengson (Australia) S Peers	3	6	[9]
2	(Australia) M Adamczak (Australia) O Rogowska	6	2	[11]
