= 2013 Bendigo Women's International (1) – Doubles =

Doubles
- 2013 Bendigo Women's International (1)

Final
- Champions: (Japan) Erika Sema (Japan) Yurika Sema
- Runners-up: (Australia) Monique Adamczak (Australia) Olivia Rogowska
- Score: 3–6, 6–2, [11–9]

Events
Singles	Doubles
← 2012 ·	Bendigo Women's International (1)	· 2014 →

Ashleigh Barty and Sally Peers were the defending champions, having won the event in 2012, but Barty decided not to participate this year. Peers partnered up with Stephanie Bengson, but lost in the first round.

Erika and Yurika Sema won the tournament, defeating Monique Adamczak and Olivia Rogowska in the final, 3–6, 6–2, [11–9].

== Seeds ==
1. (Thailand) Noppawan Lertcheewakarn / (Russia) Arina Rodionova (semifinals)
2. (Japan) Erika Sema / (Japan) Yurika Sema (champions)
3. (Australia) Monique Adamczak / (Australia) Olivia Rogowska (final)
4. (Thailand) Varatchaya Wongteanchai / (Thailand) Varunya Wongteanchai (quarterfinals; withdrew)

== Draw ==
=== Key ===
- Q = Qualifier
- WC = Wild card
- LL = Lucky loser
- Alt = Alternate
- SE = Special exempt
- PR = Protected ranking
- ITF = ITF entry
- JE = Junior exempt
- w/o = Walkover
- r = Retired
- d = Defaulted
- SR = Special ranking

First round
1	(Thailand) N Lertcheewakarn (Russia) A Rodionova	6	6
WC	(Australia) N Baric (Australia) J Karaitiana	0	0
(Australia) A Hadzic (Australia) J Moore	6	4	[12]
(Belgium) Y Bonaventure (Estonia) A Kontaveit	3	6	[10]
3	(Australia) M Adamczak (Australia) O Rogowska	6	6
(Australia) P Boyanov (Australia) A Keir	0	3
Q	(Australia) T Calderwood (New Zealand) D Hollands	7^{7}	7^{7}
Q	(New Zealand) E Hayman (Czech Republic) P Krejsová	6^{2}	6^{5}
(Australia) A Bai (Japan) S Ishizu	7^{7}	6
(Australia) N Collie (Australia) K Wlodarczak	6^{5}	3
WC	(Australia) N Bains (Australia) A Sumner	5	2
4	(Thailand) Vara Wongteanchai (Thailand) Varu Wongteanchai	7	6
(United States) I Falconi (Australia) T Patterson	7	6
(Australia) S Bengson (Australia) S Peers	5	4
(Australia) V Rajicic (Slovakia) Z Zlochová	3	3
2	(Japan) E Sema (Japan) Y Sema	6	6

Quarterfinals
1	(Thailand) N Lertcheewakarn (Russia) A Rodionova	6	6
(Australia) A Hadzic (Australia) J Moore	2	0
3	(Australia) M Adamczak (Australia) O Rogowska	6	3	[10]
Q	(Australia) T Calderwood (New Zealand) D Hollands	1	6	[7]
(Australia) A Bai (Japan) S Ishizu	w/o
4	(Thailand) Vara Wongteanchai (Thailand) Varu Wongteanchai
(United States) I Falconi (Australia) T Patterson	2	6	[6]
2	(Japan) E Sema (Japan) Y Sema	6	2	[10]

Semifinals
1	(Thailand) N Lertcheewakarn (Russia) A Rodionova	6	4	[8]
3	(Australia) M Adamczak (Australia) O Rogowska	4	6	[10]
(Australia) A Bai (Japan) S Ishizu	2	4
2	(Japan) E Sema (Japan) Y Sema	6	6

Final
3	(Australia) M Adamczak (Australia) O Rogowska	6	2	[9]
2	(Japan) E Sema (Japan) Y Sema	3	6	[11]
