= 2013 Bendigo Women's International (1) – Singles =

Singles
- 2013 Bendigo Women's International (1)

Final
- Champion: (Australia) Casey Dellacqua
- Runner-up: (Thailand) Noppawan Lertcheewakarn
- Score: 6–4, 6–4

Events
Singles	Doubles
← 2012 ·	Bendigo Women's International (1)	· 2014 →

Arina Rodionova was the defending champion, having won the event in 2012, but lost in the semifinals to Noppawan Lertcheewakarn.

Casey Dellacqua won the tournament, defeating Lertcheewakarn in the final, 6–4, 6–4.

== Seeds ==
1. (United States) Irina Falconi (semifinals)
2. (Australia) Olivia Rogowska (first round)
3. (Japan) Erika Sema (quarterfinals)
4. (Australia) Casey Dellacqua (champion)
5. (Japan) Sachie Ishizu (quarterfinals)
6. (Russia) Arina Rodionova (semifinals)
7. (Japan) Yurika Sema (second round)
8. (France) Irena Pavlovic (quarterfinals)

== Main draw ==
=== Key ===
- Q = Qualifier
- WC = Wild card
- LL = Lucky loser
- Alt = Alternate
- SE = Special exempt
- PR = Protected ranking
- ITF = ITF entry
- JE = Junior exempt
- w/o = Walkover
- r = Retired
- d = Defaulted
- SR = Special ranking

=== Finals ===
Semifinals
1	(United States) Irina Falconi	6	0	2
4	(Australia) Casey Dellacqua	4	6	6
6	(Russia) Arina Rodionova	1	6	3
(Thailand) Noppawan Lertcheewakarn	6	4	6

Final
4	(Australia) Casey Dellacqua	6	6
(Thailand) Noppawan Lertcheewakarn	4	4

=== Top half ===
First round
1	(United States) I Falconi	6	6
WC	(Australia) P Boyanov	0	1
(Australia) A Bai	4	2
(Australia) M Adamczak	6	6
WC	(Australia) A Keir	4	3
(Australia) S Peers	6	6
Q	(New Zealand) E Hayman	7	5	0
5	(Japan) S Ishizu	5	7	6
4	(Australia) C Dellacqua	6	6
(Czech Republic) P Krejsová	4	3
WC	(Australia) I Holland	7	7^{7}
WC	(Australia) N Bains	5	6^{3}
(Thailand) V Wongteanchai	6	2^{r}
(Romania) D Negreanu	4	5
Q	(Japan) A Okuno	1	6^{3}
8	(France) I Pavlovic	6	7^{7}

Second round
1	(United States) I Falconi	4	6	6
(Australia) M Adamczak	6	2	4
(Australia) S Peers	6	6^{2}	1
5	(Japan) S Ishizu	4	7^{7}	6
4	(Australia) C Dellacqua	6	6
WC	(Australia) I Holland	4	2
(Romania) D Negreanu	0	0
8	(France) I Pavlovic	6	6

Quarterfinals
1	(United States) I Falconi	7	6
5	(Japan) S Ishizu	5	4
4	(Australia) C Dellacqua	6	6
8	(France) I Pavlovic	3	3

Semifinals
1	(United States) I Falconi	6	0	2
4	(Australia) C Dellacqua	4	6	6

=== Bottom half ===
First round
6	(Russia) A Rodionova	6	6
(New Zealand) D Hollands	2	4
(Australia) A Hadzic	6	6
(Australia) N Baric	4	3
(Slovakia) Z Zlochová	6	2	6
Q	(Australia) K Wlodarczak	4	6	4
(Estonia) A Kontaveit	4	7	3
3	(Japan) E Sema	6	5	6
7	(Japan) Y Sema	6	6
(Australia) J Moore	3	1
Q	(Croatia) E Mikulčić	4	4
(Thailand) N Lertcheewakarn	6	6
(Belgium) Y Bonaventure	6	6
(Australia) T Patterson	3	4
(Australia) V Rajicic	6	6^{3}	6
2	(Australia) O Rogowska	3	7^{7}	4

Second round
6	(Russia) A Rodionova	6	6
(Australia) A Hadzic	2	2
(Slovakia) Z Zlochová	1	0
3	(Japan) E Sema	6	6
7	(Japan) Y Sema	4	1
(Thailand) N Lertcheewakarn	6	6
(Belgium) Y Bonaventure	5	6	4
(Australia) V Rajicic	7	2	6

Quarterfinals
6	(Russia) A Rodionova	0	7^{9}	7^{7}
3	(Japan) E Sema	6	6^{7}	6^{5}
(Thailand) N Lertcheewakarn	7	2	6
(Australia) V Rajicic	5	6	4

Semifinals
6	(Russia) A Rodionova	1	6	3
(Thailand) N Lertcheewakarn	6	4	6
