= 2013 Bendigo Women's International (2) – Singles =

Singles
- 2013 Bendigo Women's International (2)

Final
- Champion: (Australia) Casey Dellacqua
- Runner-up: (Australia) Tammi Patterson
- Score: 6–3, 6–1

Events
Singles	Doubles
← 2012 ·	Bendigo Women's International (2)	· 2014 →

This is the singles draw for the second Bendigo Women's International of 2013.

Casey Dellacqua won the tournament, defeating Tammi Patterson in the final, 6–3, 6–1. Dellacqua also won the first edition of the Bendigo Women's International one week previously.

== Seeds ==
1. (United States) Irina Falconi (second round)
2. (Australia) Olivia Rogowska (semifinals)
3. (Australia) Casey Dellacqua (champion)
4. (Russia) Arina Rodionova (second round)
5. (Japan) Sachie Ishizu (quarterfinals)
6. (Estonia) Anett Kontaveit (second round)
7. (France) Irena Pavlovic (semifinals; retired)
8. (Australia) Monique Adamczak (quarterfinals)

== Main draw ==
=== Key ===
- Q = Qualifier
- WC = Wild card
- LL = Lucky loser
- Alt = Alternate
- SE = Special exempt
- PR = Protected ranking
- ITF = ITF entry
- JE = Junior exempt
- w/o = Walkover
- r = Retired
- d = Defaulted
- SR = Special ranking

=== Finals ===
Semifinals
7	(France) Irena Pavlovic	5	5^{r}
(Australia) Tammi Patterson	7	5
3	(Australia) Casey Dellacqua	7	4	6
2	(Australia) Olivia Rogowska	5	6	4

Final
(Australia) Tammi Patterson	3	1
3	(Australia) Casey Dellacqua	6	6

=== Top half ===
First round
1	(United States) I Falconi	7	6
WC	(Australia) A Keir	5	3
(Croatia) E Mikulčić	6	6
(Australia) I Holland	1	3
Q	(Australia) N Bains	5	4
(Czech Republic) P Krejsová	7	6
(Slovakia) Z Zlochová	1	0
7	(France) I Pavlovic	6	6
4	(Russia) A Rodionova	6	6
WC	(Australia) Z Hives	3	1
(Australia) V Rajicic	6	4	4
(Australia) T Patterson	3	6	6
WC	(Australia) K Wlodarczak	3	1
(Belgium) Y Bonaventure	6	6
WC	(Australia) N Hoynaski	0	0
5	(Japan) S Ishizu	6	6

Second round
1	(United States) I Falconi	6	4	3
(Croatia) E Mikulčić	4	6	6
(Czech Republic) P Krejsová	3	5
7	(France) I Pavlovic	6	7
4	(Russia) A Rodionova	6	3	3
(Australia) T Patterson	2	6	6
(Belgium) Y Bonaventure	3	3
5	(Japan) S Ishizu	6	6

Quarterfinals
(Croatia) E Mikulčić	6	3	3
7	(France) I Pavlovic	2	6	6
(Australia) T Patterson	6	6
5	(Japan) S Ishizu	4	2

Semifinals
7	(France) I Pavlovic	5	5^{r}
(Australia) T Patterson	7	5

=== Bottom half ===
First round
6	(Estonia) A Kontaveit	6	6
Q	(New Zealand) E Hayman	0	0
(Thailand) N Lertcheewakarn	7	6
(Australia) A Bai	5	4
(Japan) M Ozeki	6	6
(Romania) D Negreanu	3	2
Q	(Australia) K Ryan	1	1
3	(Australia) C Dellacqua	6	6
8	(Australia) M Adamczak	6	3	6
(New Zealand) D Hollands	3	6	0
(Australia) S Peers	6	6
Q	(Thailand) Varu Wongteanchai	2	4
(Australia) N Baric	2	3
(Australia) J Moore	6	6
(Australia) A Hadzic	4	3
2	(Australia) O Rogowska	6	6

Second round
6	(Estonia) A Kontaveit	3	6	1
(Thailand) N Lertcheewakarn	6	4	6
(Japan) M Ozeki	4	5
3	(Australia) C Dellacqua	6	7
8	(Australia) M Adamczak	6	0	6
(Australia) S Peers	3	6	2
(Australia) J Moore	2	3
2	(Australia) O Rogowska	6	6

Quarterfinals
(Thailand) N Lertcheewakarn	1	3
3	(Australia) C Dellacqua	6	6
8	(Australia) M Adamczak	6	2	2
2	(Australia) O Rogowska	2	6	6

Semifinals
3	(Australia) C Dellacqua	7	4	6
2	(Australia) O Rogowska	5	6	4
