= 2013 Bendigo Women's International (2) =

- Date: 28 October–3 November
- Edition: 6th (2nd of 2013)
- Category: ITF Women's Circuit
- Prize money: $50,000
- Surface: Hard
- Location: Bendigo, Australia

Champions

Singles
- (Australia) Casey Dellacqua

Doubles
- (Australia) Monique Adamczak / (Australia) Olivia Rogowska
← 2013 ·	Bendigo Women's International	· 2014 →

The 2013 Bendigo Women's International (2) was a professional tennis tournament played on outdoor hard courts. It was the sixth edition of the tournament (second of the year) which was part of the 2013 ITF Women's Circuit, offering a total of $50,000 in prize money. It took place in Bendigo, Australia, on 28 October–3 November 2013. Rodionova, Barty and Peers were listed as the defending champions as they were the champions of the event last year, as there were two events in 2013 they are listed as defending champions for both editions.

== WTA entrants ==
=== Seeds ===
Country	Player	Rank^{1}	Seed
USA	Irina Falconi	153	1
AUS	Olivia Rogowska	171	2
AUS	Casey Dellacqua	181	3
RUS	Arina Rodionova	203	4
JPN	Sachie Ishizu	210	5
EST	Anett Kontaveit	234	6
FRA	Irena Pavlovic	242	7
AUS	Monique Adamczak	249	8

- ^{1} Rankings as of 21 October 2013

=== Other entrants ===
The following players received wildcards into the singles main draw:

- (Australia) Zoe Hives
- (Australia) Nicole Hoynaski
- (Australia) Ashley Keir
- (Australia) Karolina Wlodarczak

The following players received entry from the qualifying draw:

- (Australia) Naiktha Bains
- (New Zealand) Emma Hayman
- (Australia) Karis Ryan
- (Thailand) Varunya Wongteanchai

== Champions ==
=== Singles ===
- (Australia) Casey Dellacqua def. (Australia) Tammi Patterson 6–3, 6–1

=== Doubles ===
- (Australia) Monique Adamczak / (Australia) Olivia Rogowska def. (Australia) Stephanie Bengson / (Australia) Sally Peers 6–3, 2–6, [11–9]
