= 2016 Australian Open – Day-by-day summaries =

== Day 1 (18 January) ==
- Seeds out:
  - Men's Singles: (France) Benoît Paire [17], (Croatia) Ivo Karlović [22]
  - Women's Singles: (Denmark) Caroline Wozniacki [16], (Italy) Sara Errani [17], (Germany) Andrea Petkovic [22], (United States) Sloane Stephens [24], (Australia) Samantha Stosur [25], (Russia) Anastasia Pavlyuchenkova [26], (Slovakia) Anna Karolína Schmiedlová [27]
- Schedule of Play

Matches on main courts
Matches on Rod Laver Arena
Event	Winner	Loser	Score
Women's Singles 1st Round	(Czech Republic) Petra Kvitová [6]	(Thailand) Luksika Kumkhum [Q]	6–3, 6–1
Women's Singles 1st Round	(United States) Serena Williams [1]	(Italy) Camila Giorgi	6–4, 7–5
Men's Singles 1st Round	(Serbia) Novak Djokovic [1]	(South Korea) Chung Hyeon	6–3, 6–2, 6–4
Men's Singles 1st Round	(Switzerland) Roger Federer [3]	(Georgia (country)) Nikoloz Basilashvili	6–2, 6–1, 6–2
Women's Singles 1st Round	(Czech Republic) Kristýna Plíšková [Q]	(Australia) Samantha Stosur [25]	6–4, 7–6^{(8–6)}
Matches on Margaret Court Arena
Event	Winner	Loser	Score
Women's Singles 1st Round	(Australia) Daria Gavrilova	(Czech Republic) Lucie Hradecká	7–6^{(7–3)}, 6–4
Men's Singles 1st Round	(Czech Republic) Tomáš Berdych [6]	(India) Yuki Bhambri	7–5, 6–1, 6–2
Women's Singles 1st Round	(Poland) Agnieszka Radwańska [4]	(United States) Christina McHale	6–2, 6–3
Women's Singles 1st Round	(Russia) Maria Sharapova [5]	(Japan) Nao Hibino	6–1, 6–3
Men's Singles 1st Round	(France) Jo-Wilfried Tsonga [9]	(Cyprus) Marcos Baghdatis	6–4, 4–6, 6–4, 6–2
Matches on Hisense Arena
Event	Winner	Loser	Score
Men's Singles 1st Round	(Japan) Kei Nishikori [7]	(Germany) Philipp Kohlschreiber	6–4, 6–3, 6–3
Women's Singles 1st Round	(China) Wang Qiang [Q]	(United States) Sloane Stephens [24]	6–3, 6–3
Women's Singles 1st Round	(Kazakhstan) Yulia Putintseva	(Denmark) Caroline Wozniacki [16]	1–6, 7–6^{(7–3)}, 6–4
Men's Singles 1st Round	(Australia) Nick Kyrgios [29]	(Spain) Pablo Carreño Busta	6–2, 7–5, 6–2
Colored background indicates a night match
Matches start at 11:00 am; night matches do not start before 7:00 pm

== Day 2 (19 January) ==
- Seeds out:
  - Men's Singles: (Spain) Rafael Nadal [5], (South Africa) Kevin Anderson [11], (Italy) Fabio Fognini [20]
  - Women's Singles: (Romania) Simona Halep [2], (United States) Venus Williams [8], (Romania) Irina-Camelia Begu [29], (Ukraine) Lesia Tsurenko [31], (France) Caroline Garcia [32]
- Schedule of Play

Matches on main courts
Matches on Rod Laver Arena
Event	Winner	Loser	Score
Women's Singles 1st Round	(Spain) Garbiñe Muguruza [3]	(Estonia) Anett Kontaveit	6–0, 6–4
Women's Singles 1st Round	(United Kingdom) Johanna Konta	(United States) Venus Williams [8]	6–4, 6–2
Men's Singles 1st Round	(Spain) Fernando Verdasco	(Spain) Rafael Nadal [5]	7–6^{(8–6)}, 4–6, 3–6, 7–6^{(7–4)}, 6–2
Men's Singles 1st Round	(Australia) Lleyton Hewitt [WC]	(Australia) James Duckworth [WC]	7–6^{(7–5)}, 6–2, 6–4
Women's Singles 1st Round	(Belarus) Victoria Azarenka [14]	(Belgium) Alison Van Uytvanck	6–0, 6–0
Matches on Margaret Court Arena
Event	Winner	Loser	Score
Women's Singles 1st Round	(United States) Madison Keys [15]	(Kazakhstan) Zarina Diyas	7–6^{(7–5)}, 6–1
Men's Singles 1st Round	(United Kingdom) Andy Murray [2]	(Germany) Alexander Zverev	6–1, 6–2, 6–3
Women's Singles 1st Round	(Latvia) Anastasija Sevastova [Q]	(Australia) Jarmila Wolfe	6–0, 4–2, retired
Women's Singles 1st Round	(China) Zhang Shuai [Q]	(Romania) Simona Halep [2]	6–4, 6–3
Men's Singles 1st Round	(Switzerland) Stan Wawrinka [4]	(Russia) Dmitry Tursunov [PR]	7–6^{(7–2)}, 6–3, retired
Matches on Hisense Arena
Event	Winner	Loser	Score
Men's Singles 1st Round	(Australia) Sam Groth	(France) Adrian Mannarino	7–6^{(8–6)}, 6–4, 3–6, 6–3
Women's Singles 1st Round	(Czech Republic) Karolína Plíšková [9]	(Australia) Kimberly Birrell [WC]	6–4, 6–4
Women's Singles 1st Round	(Serbia) Ana Ivanovic [20]	(Australia) Tammi Patterson [WC]	6–2, 6–3
Men's Singles 1st Round	(Australia) Bernard Tomic [16]	(Uzbekistan) Denis Istomin	6–7^{(4–7)}, 6–4, 6–4, 6–4
Colored background indicates a night match
Matches start at 11:00 am; night matches do not start before 7:00 pm

== Day 3 (20 January) ==
- Seeds out:
  - Women's Singles: (Czech Republic) Petra Kvitová [6], (Russia) Svetlana Kuznetsova [23]
  - Women's Doubles: (Canada) Gabriela Dabrowski / (Poland) Alicja Rosolska [16]
- Schedule of Play

Matches on main courts
Matches on Rod Laver Arena
Event	Winner	Loser	Score
Women's Singles 2nd Round	(Russia) Maria Sharapova [5]	(Belarus) Aliaksandra Sasnovich	6–2, 6–1
Women's Singles 2nd Round	(United States) Serena Williams [1]	(Chinese Taipei) Hsieh Su-wei	6–1, 6–2
Men's Singles 2nd Round	(Switzerland) Roger Federer [3]	(Ukraine) Alexandr Dolgopolov	6–3, 7–5, 6–1
Women's Singles 2nd Round	(Poland) Agnieszka Radwańska [4]	(Canada) Eugenie Bouchard	6–4, 6–2
Men's Singles 2nd Round	(Serbia) Novak Djokovic [1]	(France) Quentin Halys [WC]	6–1, 6–2, 7–6^{(7–3)}
Matches on Margaret Court Arena
Event	Winner	Loser	Score
Men's Singles 2nd Round	(Japan) Kei Nishikori [7]	(United States) Austin Krajicek	6–3, 7–6^{(7–5)}, 6–3
Women's Singles 2nd Round	(Switzerland) Belinda Bencic [12]	(Hungary) Tímea Babos	6–3, 6–3
Women's Singles 2nd Round	(Spain) Carla Suárez Navarro [10]	(Greece) Maria Sakkari [Q]	6–7^{(5–7)}, 6–2, 6–2
Men's Singles 2nd Round	(France) Jo-Wilfried Tsonga [9]	(Australia) Omar Jasika [WC]	7–5, 6–1, 6–4
Women's Singles 2nd Round	(Australia) Daria Gavrilova	(Czech Republic) Petra Kvitová [6]	6–4, 6–4
Matches on Hisense Arena
Event	Winner	Loser	Score
Women's Singles 2nd Round	(Ukraine) Kateryna Bondarenko	(Russia) Svetlana Kuznetsova [23]	6–1, 7–5
Women's Singles 2nd Round	(Italy) Roberta Vinci [13]	(United States) Irina Falconi	6–2, 6–3
Men's Singles 2nd Round	(Czech Republic) Tomáš Berdych [6]	(Bosnia and Herzegovina) Mirza Bašić [Q]	6–4, 6–0, 6–3
Men's Singles 2nd Round	(Australia) Nick Kyrgios [29]	(Uruguay) Pablo Cuevas	6–4, 7–5, 7–6^{(7–2)}
Colored background indicates a night match
Matches start at 11:00 am; night matches do not start before 7:00 pm

== Day 4 (21 January) ==
- Seeds out:
  - Men's Singles: (United States) Jack Sock [25], (France) Jérémy Chardy [30]
  - Women's Singles: (Switzerland) Timea Bacsinszky [11], (Ukraine) Elina Svitolina [18], (Serbia) Jelena Janković [19], (Germany) Sabine Lisicki [30]
  - Women's Doubles: (Spain) Lara Arruabarrena / (Slovenia) Andreja Klepač [8], (Romania) Irina-Camelia Begu / (Romania) Monica Niculescu [9], (Netherlands) Kiki Bertens / (Sweden) Johanna Larsson [14]
- Schedule of Play

Matches on main courts
Matches on Rod Laver Arena
Event	Winner	Loser	Score
Women's Singles 2nd Round	(Serbia) Ana Ivanovic [20]	(Latvia) Anastasija Sevastova [Q]	6–3, 6–3
Women's Singles 2nd Round	(Spain) Garbiñe Muguruza [3]	(Belgium) Kirsten Flipkens	6–4, 6–2
Men's Singles 2nd Round	(United Kingdom) Andy Murray [2]	(Australia) Sam Groth	6–0, 6–4, 6–1
Men's Singles 2nd Round	(Spain) David Ferrer [8]	(Australia) Lleyton Hewitt [WC]	6–2, 6–4, 6–4
Women's Singles 2nd Round	(Czech Republic) Karolína Plíšková [9]	(Germany) Julia Görges	7–6^{(7–5)}, 6–1
Matches on Margaret Court Arena
Event	Winner	Loser	Score
Men's Singles 2nd Round	(France) Gaël Monfils [23]	(France) Nicolas Mahut	7–5, 6–4, 6–1
Women's Singles 2nd Round	(Belarus) Victoria Azarenka [14]	(Montenegro) Danka Kovinić	6–1, 6–2
Women's Singles 2nd Round	(United States) Madison Keys [15]	(Kazakhstan) Yaroslava Shvedova	6–7^{(4–7)}, 6–3, 6–3
Women's Singles 2nd Round	(Germany) Angelique Kerber [7]	(Romania) Alexandra Dulgheru	6–2, 6–4
Men's Singles 2nd Round	(Australia) Bernard Tomic [16]	(Italy) Simone Bolelli	6–4, 6–2, 6–7^{(5–7)}, 7–5
Matches on Hisense Arena
Event	Winner	Loser	Score
Men's Singles 2nd Round	(United States) John Isner [10]	(Spain) Marcel Granollers	6–3, 7–6^{(8–6)}, 7–6^{(7–2)}
Women's Singles 2nd Round	(Germany) Laura Siegemund	(Serbia) Jelena Janković [19]	3–6, 7–6^{(7–5)}, 6–4
Men's Doubles 1st Round	(India) Rohan Bopanna [4] (Romania) Florin Mergea [4]	(Australia) Omar Jasika [WC] (Australia) Nick Kyrgios [WC]	7–5, 6–3
Men's Singles 2nd Round	(Switzerland) Stan Wawrinka [4]	(Czech Republic) Radek Štěpánek [Q]	6–2, 6–3, 6–4
Colored background indicates a night match
Matches start at 11:00 am; night matches do not start before 7:00 pm

== Day 5 (22 January) ==
- Seeds out:
  - Men's Singles: (Croatia) Marin Čilić [12], (Austria) Dominic Thiem [19], (Spain) Guillermo García-López [26], (Bulgaria) Grigor Dimitrov [27], (Italy) Andreas Seppi [28], (Australia) Nick Kyrgios [29]
  - Women's Singles: (Italy) Roberta Vinci [13], (France) Kristina Mladenovic [28]
  - Women's Doubles: (Hungary) Tímea Babos / (Slovenia) Katarina Srebotnik [4]
- Schedule of Play

Matches on main courts
Matches on Rod Laver Arena
Event	Winner	Loser	Score
Women's Singles 3rd Round	(Switzerland) Belinda Bencic [12]	(Ukraine) Kateryna Bondarenko	4–6, 6–2, 6–4
Women's Singles 3rd Round	(Russia) Maria Sharapova [5]	(United States) Lauren Davis	6–1, 6–7^{(5–7)}, 6–0
Men's Singles 3rd Round	(Switzerland) Roger Federer [3]	(Bulgaria) Grigor Dimitrov [27]	6–4, 3–6, 6–1, 6–4
Women's Singles 3rd Round	(United States) Serena Williams [1]	(Russia) Daria Kasatkina	6–1, 6–1
Men's Singles 3rd Round	(Czech Republic) Tomáš Berdych [6]	(Australia) Nick Kyrgios [29]	6–3, 6–4, 1–6, 6–4
Matches on Margaret Court Arena
Event	Winner	Loser	Score
Men's Singles 3rd Round	(Japan) Kei Nishikori [7]	(Spain) Guillermo García-López [26]	7–5, 2–6, 6–3, 6–4
Men's Singles 3rd Round	(France) Jo-Wilfried Tsonga [9]	(France) Pierre-Hugues Herbert [Q]	6–4, 7–6^{(9–7)}, 7–6^{(7–4)}
Women's Singles 3rd Round	(Poland) Agnieszka Radwańska [4]	(Puerto Rico) Monica Puig	6–4, 6–0
Men's Singles 3rd Round	(Serbia) Novak Djokovic [1]	(Italy) Andreas Seppi [28]	6–1, 7–5, 7–6^{(8–6)}
Women's Singles 3rd Round	(Spain) Carla Suárez Navarro [10]	(Russia) Elizaveta Kulichkova	6–4, 2–0, retired
Matches on Hisense Arena
Event	Winner	Loser	Score
Men's Singles 3rd Round	(Belgium) David Goffin [15]	(Austria) Dominic Thiem [19]	6–1, 3–6, 7–6^{(7–2)}, 7–5
Women's Singles 3rd Round	(Germany) Anna-Lena Friedsam	(Italy) Roberta Vinci [13]	0–6, 6–4, 6–4
Men's Singles 3rd Round	(France) Gilles Simon [14]	(Argentina) Federico Delbonis	6–3, 6–2, 6–1
Women's Singles 3rd Round	(Australia) Daria Gavrilova	(France) Kristina Mladenovic [28]	6–4, 4–6, 11–9
Colored background indicates a night match
Matches start at 11:00 am; night matches do not start before 7:00 pm

== Day 6 (23 January) ==
- Seeds out:
  - Men's Singles: (Spain) Feliciano López [18], (Serbia) Viktor Troicki [21], (United States) Steve Johnson [31], (Portugal) João Sousa [32]
  - Women's Singles: (Spain) Garbiñe Muguruza [3], (Czech Republic) Karolína Plíšková [9], (Serbia) Ana Ivanovic [20]
  - Men's Doubles: (Italy) Simone Bolelli / (Italy) Fabio Fognini [5], (France) Pierre-Hugues Herbert / (France) Nicolas Mahut [6], (Finland) Henri Kontinen / (Australia) John Peers [8], (Poland) Łukasz Kubot / (Poland) Marcin Matkowski [10]
  - Women's Doubles: (United States) Raquel Atawo / (United States) Abigail Spears [6], (Kazakhstan) Yaroslava Shvedova / (Australia) Samantha Stosur [11]
  - Mixed Doubles: (Chinese Taipei) Chan Hao-ching / (Belarus) Max Mirnyi [8]
- Schedule of Play

Matches on main courts
Matches on Rod Laver Arena
Event	Winner	Loser	Score
Women's Singles 3rd Round	(Czech Republic) Barbora Strýcová	(Spain) Garbiñe Muguruza [3]	6–3, 6–2
Women's Singles 3rd Round	(Belarus) Victoria Azarenka [14]	(Japan) Naomi Osaka [Q]	6–1, 6–1
Men's Singles 3rd Round	(Switzerland) Stan Wawrinka [4]	(Czech Republic) Lukáš Rosol	6–2, 6–3, 7–6^{(7–3)}
Women's Singles 3rd Round	(United States) Madison Keys [15]	(Serbia) Ana Ivanovic [20]	4–6, 6–4, 6–4
Men's Singles 3rd Round	(Australia) Bernard Tomic [16]	(Australia) John Millman	6–4, 7–6^{(7–4)}, 6–2
Matches on Margaret Court Arena
Event	Winner	Loser	Score
Women's Singles 3rd Round	(Russia) Ekaterina Makarova [21]	(Czech Republic) Karolína Plíšková [9]	6–3, 6–2
Men's Singles 3rd Round	(Canada) Milos Raonic [13]	(Serbia) Viktor Troicki [21]	6–2, 6–3, 6–4
Women's Singles 3rd Round	(Germany) Angelique Kerber [7]	(United States) Madison Brengle	6–1, 6–3
Men's Singles 3rd Round	(United Kingdom) Andy Murray [2]	(Portugal) João Sousa [32]	6–2, 3–6, 6–2, 6–2
Women's Singles 3rd Round	(China) Zhang Shuai [Q]	(United States) Varvara Lepchenko	6–1, 6–3
Matches on Hisense Arena
Event	Winner	Loser	Score
Women's Singles 3rd Round	(United Kingdom) Johanna Konta	(Czech Republic) Denisa Allertová	6–2, 6–2
Men's Singles 3rd Round	(United States) John Isner [10]	(Spain) Feliciano López [18]	6–7^{(8–10)}, 7–6^{(7–5)}, 6–2, 6–4
Men's Singles 3rd Round	(France) Gaël Monfils [23]	(France) Stéphane Robert [Q]	7–5, 6–3, 6–2
Men's Doubles 2nd Round	(Australia) Sam Groth [WC] (Australia) Lleyton Hewitt [WC]	(Finland) Henri Kontinen [8] (Australia) John Peers [8]	2–6, 6–4, 6–4
Colored background indicates a night match
Matches start at 11:00 am; night matches do not start before 7:00 pm

== Day 7 (24 January) ==
- Seeds out:
  - Men's Singles: (France) Jo-Wilfried Tsonga [9], (France) Gilles Simon [14], (Belgium) David Goffin [15], (Spain) Roberto Bautista Agut [24]
  - Women's Singles: (Switzerland) Belinda Bencic [12]
  - Men's Doubles: (Croatia) Ivan Dodig / (Brazil) Marcelo Melo [2], (India) Rohan Bopanna / (Romania) Florin Mergea [4], (Spain) Feliciano López / (Spain) Marc López [15]
  - Women's Doubles: (Spain) Anabel Medina Garrigues / (Spain) Arantxa Parra Santonja [10]
  - Mixed Doubles: (Czech Republic) Lucie Hradecká / (Poland) Marcin Matkowski [6], (United States) Raquel Atawo / (South Africa) Raven Klaasen [7]
- Schedule of Play

Matches on main courts
Matches on Rod Laver Arena
Event	Winner	Loser	Score
Women's Singles 4th Round	(Russia) Maria Sharapova [5]	(Switzerland) Belinda Bencic [12]	7–5, 7–5
Women's Singles 4th Round	(United States) Serena Williams [1]	(Russia) Margarita Gasparyan	6–2, 6–1
Men's Singles 4th Round	(Serbia) Novak Djokovic [1]	(France) Gilles Simon [14]	6–3, 6–7^{(1–7)}, 6–4, 4–6, 6–3
Women's Singles 4th Round	(Spain) Carla Suárez Navarro [10]	(Australia) Daria Gavrilova	0–6, 6–3, 6–2
Men's Singles 4th Round	(Switzerland) Roger Federer [3]	(Belgium) David Goffin [15]	6–2, 6–1, 6–4
Matches on Margaret Court Arena
Event	Winner	Loser	Score
Mixed Doubles 1st Round	(Switzerland) Martina Hingis (India) Leander Paes	(Russia) Anastasia Pavlyuchenkova (United Kingdom) Dominic Inglot	6–3, 7–5
Men's Doubles 2nd Round	(Italy) Marco Cecchinato (Italy) Andreas Seppi	(Spain) Feliciano López [15] (Spain) Marc López [15]	1–6, 7–6^{(7–1)}, 7–5
Men's Doubles 3rd Round	(Canada) Vasek Pospisil [9] (United States) Jack Sock [9]	(Australia) Sam Groth [WC] (Australia) Lleyton Hewitt [WC]	6–4, 6–2
Men's Singles 4th Round	(Czech Republic) Tomáš Berdych [6]	(Spain) Roberto Bautista Agut [24]	4–6, 6–4, 6–3, 1–6, 6–3
Matches on Hisense Arena
Event	Winner	Loser	Score
Men's Singles 4th Round	(Japan) Kei Nishikori [7]	(France) Jo-Wilfried Tsonga [9]	6–4, 6–2, 6–4
Men's Doubles 3rd Round	(Uruguay) Pablo Cuevas [16] (Spain) Marcel Granollers [16]	(Croatia) Ivan Dodig [2] (Brazil) Marcelo Melo [2]	7–6^{(7–3)}, 2–6, 6–3
Women's Doubles 3rd Round	(Australia) Anastasia Rodionova (Australia) Arina Rodionova	(Slovakia) Dominika Cibulková (Belgium) Kirsten Flipkens	5–7, 6–2, 6–4
Women's Singles 4th Round	(Poland) Agnieszka Radwańska [4]	(Germany) Anna-Lena Friedsam	6–7^{(6–8)}, 6–1, 7–5
Colored background indicates a night match
Matches start at 11:00 am; night matches do not start before 7:00 pm

== Day 8 (25 January) ==
- Seeds out:
  - Men's Singles: (Switzerland) Stan Wawrinka [4], (United States) John Isner [10], (Australia) Bernard Tomic [16]
  - Women's Singles: (United States) Madison Keys [15], (Russia) Ekaterina Makarova [21]
  - Men's Doubles: (United States) Bob Bryan / (United States) Mike Bryan [3], (United Kingdom) Dominic Inglot / (Sweden) Robert Lindstedt [11], (Colombia) Juan Sebastián Cabal / (Colombia) Robert Farah [12]
  - Women's Doubles: (France) Caroline Garcia / (France) Kristina Mladenovic [3], (Russia) Anastasia Pavlyuchenkova / (Russia) Elena Vesnina [5]
- Schedule of Play

Matches on main courts
Matches on Rod Laver Arena
Event	Winner	Loser	Score
Women's Singles 4th Round	(Germany) Angelique Kerber [7]	(Germany) Annika Beck	6–4, 6–0
Women's Singles 4th Round	(Belarus) Victoria Azarenka [14]	(Czech Republic) Barbora Strýcová	6–2, 6–4
Men's Singles 4th Round	(Canada) Milos Raonic [13]	(Switzerland) Stan Wawrinka [4]	6–4, 6–3, 5–7, 4–6, 6–3
Men's Singles 4th Round	(United Kingdom) Andy Murray [2]	(Australia) Bernard Tomic [16]	6–4, 6–4, 7–6^{(7–4)}
Women's Singles 4th Round	(China) Zhang Shuai [Q]	(United States) Madison Keys [15]	3–6, 6–3, 6–3
Matches on Margaret Court Arena
Event	Winner	Loser	Score
Women's Doubles 3rd Round	(Germany) Julia Görges [13] (Czech Republic) Karolína Plíšková [13]	(France) Caroline Garcia [3] (France) Kristina Mladenovic [3]	6–1, 7–6^{(7–5)}
Men's Singles 4th Round	(France) Gaël Monfils [23]	(Russia) Andrey Kuznetsov	7–5, 3–6, 6–3, 7–6^{(7–4)}
Women's Doubles 3rd Round	(Switzerland) Martina Hingis [1] (India) Sania Mirza [1]	(Russia) Svetlana Kuznetsova (Italy) Roberta Vinci	6–1, 6–3
Women's Singles 4th Round	(United Kingdom) Johanna Konta	(Russia) Ekaterina Makarova [21]	4–6, 6–4, 8–6
Matches on Hisense Arena
Event	Winner	Loser	Score
Women's Doubles 3rd Round	(China) Xu Yifan [15] (China) Zheng Saisai [15]	(Chinese Taipei) Hsieh Su-wei (Georgia (country)) Oksana Kalashnikova	6–2, 6–4
Men's Doubles 3rd Round	(South Africa) Raven Klaasen [13] (United States) Rajeev Ram [13]	(United States) Bob Bryan [3] (United States) Mike Bryan [3]	3–6, 6–3, 6–4
Men's Legends Doubles	(South Africa) Wayne Ferreira (Sweden) Mats Wilander	(Australia) Wayne Arthurs (United States) Michael Chang	4–3^{(5–3)}, 2–4, 4–3^{(5–4)}
Mixed Doubles 2nd Round	(United States) Bethanie Mattek-Sands [2] (United States) Bob Bryan [2]	(Australia) Samantha Stosur (Australia) John Peers	6–4, 6–2
Men's Singles 4th Round	(Spain) David Ferrer [8]	(United States) John Isner [10]	6–4, 6–4, 7–5
Colored background indicates a night match
Matches start at 11:00 am; night matches do not start before 7:00 pm

== Day 9 (26 January) ==
- Seeds out:
  - Men's Singles: (Czech Republic) Tomáš Berdych [6], (Japan) Kei Nishikori [7]
  - Women's Singles: (Russia) Maria Sharapova [5], (Spain) Carla Suárez Navarro [10]
  - Men's Doubles: (Netherlands) Jean-Julien Rojer / (Romania) Horia Tecău [1], (Canada) Vasek Pospisil / (United States) Jack Sock [9], (South Africa) Raven Klaasen / (United States) Rajeev Ram [13], (Philippines) Treat Huey / (Belarus) Max Mirnyi [14]
  - Women's Doubles: (Chinese Taipei) Chan Hao-ching / (Chinese Taipei) Chan Yung-jan [2], (Germany) Anna-Lena Grönefeld / (United States) Coco Vandeweghe [12]
- Schedule of Play

Matches on main courts
Matches on Rod Laver Arena
Event	Winner	Loser	Score
Women's Singles Quarterfinals	(Poland) Agnieszka Radwańska [4]	(Spain) Carla Suárez Navarro [10]	6–1, 6–3
Women's Singles Quarterfinals	(United States) Serena Williams [1]	(Russia) Maria Sharapova [5]	6–4, 6–1
Men's Singles Quarterfinals	(Switzerland) Roger Federer [3]	(Czech Republic) Tomáš Berdych [6]	7–6^{(7–4)}, 6–2, 6–4
Men's Singles Quarterfinals	(Serbia) Novak Djokovic [1]	(Japan) Kei Nishikori [7]	6–3, 6–2, 6–4
Women's Doubles Quarterfinals	(China) Xu Yifan [15] (China) Zheng Saisai [15]	(Australia) Anastasia Rodionova (Australia) Arina Rodionova	6–2, 5–7, 6–4
Matches on Margaret Court Arena
Event	Winner	Loser	Score
Men's Doubles Quarterfinals	(Uruguay) Pablo Cuevas [16] (Spain) Marcel Granollers [16]	(Canada) Vasek Pospisil [9] (United States) Jack Sock [9]	5–7, 6–1, 6–2
Women's Doubles Quarterfinals	(Switzerland) Martina Hingis [1] (India) Sania Mirza [1]	(Germany) Anna-Lena Grönefeld [12] (United States) Coco Vandeweghe [12]	6–2, 4–6, 6–1
Men's Doubles Quarterfinals	(Canada) Daniel Nestor (Czech Republic) Radek Štěpánek	(Philippines) Treat Huey [14] (Belarus) Max Mirnyi [14]	6–4, 6–4
Mixed Doubles 2nd Round	(Switzerland) Martina Hingis (India) Leander Paes	(United States) Sloane Stephens (Netherlands) Jean-Julien Rojer	6–1, 6–2
Colored background indicates a night match
Matches start at 11:00 am; night matches do not start before 7:15 pm

== Day 10 (27 January) ==
- Seeds out:
  - Men's Singles: (Spain) David Ferrer [8], (France) Gaël Monfils [23]
  - Women's Singles: (Belarus) Victoria Azarenka [14]
  - Women's Doubles: (Germany) Julia Görges / (Czech Republic) Karolína Plíšková [13], (China) Xu Yifan / (China) Zheng Saisai [15]
  - Mixed Doubles: (United States) Bethanie Mattek-Sands / (United States) Bob Bryan [2], (Chinese Taipei) Chan Yung-jan / (India) Rohan Bopanna [3], (Slovenia) Katarina Srebotnik / (United Kingdom) Jamie Murray [4]
- Schedule of Play

Matches on main courts
Matches on Rod Laver Arena
Event	Winner	Loser	Score
Women's Singles Quarterfinals	(Germany) Angelique Kerber [7]	(Belarus) Victoria Azarenka [14]	6–3, 7–5
Women's Singles Quarterfinals	(United Kingdom) Johanna Konta	(China) Zhang Shuai [Q]	6–4, 6–1
Men's Singles Quarterfinals	(United Kingdom) Andy Murray [2]	(Spain) David Ferrer [8]	6–3, 6–7^{(5–7)}, 6–2, 6–3
Men's Singles Quarterfinals	(Canada) Milos Raonic [13]	(France) Gaël Monfils [23]	6–3, 3–6, 6–3, 6–4
Women's Doubles Semifinals	(Switzerland) Martina Hingis [1] (India) Sania Mirza [1]	(Germany) Julia Görges [13] (Czech Republic) Karolína Plíšková [13]	6–1, 6–0
Colored background indicates a night match
Matches start at 11:00 am; night matches do not start before 7:30 pm

== Day 11 (28 January) ==
- Seeds out:
  - Men's Singles: (Switzerland) Roger Federer [3]
  - Women's Singles: (Poland) Agnieszka Radwańska [4]
  - Men's Doubles: (Uruguay) Pablo Cuevas / (Spain) Marcel Granollers [16]
- Schedule of Play

Matches on main courts
Matches on Rod Laver Arena
Event	Winner	Loser	Score
Men's Doubles Semifinals	(United Kingdom) Jamie Murray [7] (Brazil) Bruno Soares [7]	(France) Adrian Mannarino (France) Lucas Pouille	6–3, 6–1
Women's Singles Semifinals	(United States) Serena Williams [1]	(Poland) Agnieszka Radwańska [4]	6–0, 6–4
Women's Singles Semifinals	(Germany) Angelique Kerber [7]	(United Kingdom) Johanna Konta	7–5, 6–2
Men's Singles Semifinals	(Serbia) Novak Djokovic [1]	(Switzerland) Roger Federer [3]	6–1, 6–2, 3–6, 6–3
Exhibition Doubles	(Belgium) Kim Clijsters (Australia) Todd Woodbridge	(Spain) Arantxa Sánchez Vicario (France) Henri Leconte	4–2, 4–3^{(5–3)}
Colored background indicates a night match
Matches start at 11:00 am; night matches do not start before 7:30 pm

== Day 12 (29 January) ==
- Seeds out:
  - Men's Singles: (Canada) Milos Raonic [13]
  - Women's Doubles: (Czech Republic) Andrea Hlaváčková / (Czech Republic) Lucie Hradecká [7]
  - Mixed Doubles: (India) Sania Mirza / (Croatia) Ivan Dodig [1]
- Schedule of Play

Matches on main courts
Matches on Rod Laver Arena
Event	Winner	Loser	Score
Mixed Doubles Semifinals	(United States) Coco Vandeweghe (Romania) Horia Tecău	(Slovenia) Andreja Klepač (Philippines) Treat Huey	6–4, 6–4
Women's Doubles Final	(Switzerland) Martina Hingis [1] (India) Sania Mirza [1]	(Czech Republic) Andrea Hlaváčková [7] (Czech Republic) Lucie Hradecká [7]	7–6^{(7–1)}, 6–3
Men's Singles Semifinals	(United Kingdom) Andy Murray [2]	(Canada) Milos Raonic [13]	4–6, 7–5, 6–7^{(4–7)}, 6–4, 6–2
Matches on Hisense Arena
Event	Winner	Loser	Score
Mixed Doubles Semifinals	(Russia) Elena Vesnina [5] (Brazil) Bruno Soares [5]	(India) Sania Mirza [1] (Croatia) Ivan Dodig [1]	7–5, 7–6^{(7–4)}
Colored background indicates a night match
Matches start at 3:00 pm; night matches do not start before 7:30 pm

== Day 13 (30 January) ==
- Seeds out:
  - Women's Singles: (United States) Serena Williams [1]
- Schedule of Play

Matches on main courts
Matches on Rod Laver Arena
Event	Winner	Loser	Score
Women's Singles Final	(Germany) Angelique Kerber [7]	(United States) Serena Williams [1]	6–4, 3–6, 6–4
Men's Doubles Final	(United Kingdom) Jamie Murray [7] (Brazil) Bruno Soares [7]	(Canada) Daniel Nestor (Czech Republic) Radek Štěpánek	2–6, 6–4, 7–5
Colored background indicates a night match
Matches start at 1:00 pm; night matches do not start before 7:30 pm

== Day 14 (31 January) ==
- Seeds out:
  - Men's Singles: (United Kingdom) Andy Murray [2]
- Schedule of Play

Matches
Matches on Rod Laver Arena
Event	Winner	Loser	Score
Mixed Doubles Final	(Russia) Elena Vesnina [5] (Brazil) Bruno Soares [5]	(United States) Coco Vandeweghe (Romania) Horia Tecău	6–4, 4–6, [10–5]
Men's Singles Final	(Serbia) Novak Djokovic [1]	(United Kingdom) Andy Murray [2]	6–1, 7–5, 7–6^{(7–3)}
Colored background indicates a night match
Matches start at 4:00 pm; night matches do not start before 7:30 pm
