= 2013 Bendigo Women's International (1) =

- Date: 21–27 October
- Edition: 5th
- Category: ITF Women's Circuit
- Prize money: $50,000
- Surface: Hard
- Location: Bendigo, Australia

Champions

Singles
- (Australia) Casey Dellacqua

Doubles
- (Japan) Erika Sema / (Japan) Yurika Sema
Bendigo Women's International	· 2013 →

The 2013 Bendigo Women's International (1) was a professional tennis tournament played on outdoor hard courts. It was the fifth edition of the tournament which was part of the 2013 ITF Women's Circuit, offering a total of $50,000 in prize money. It took place in Bendigo, Australia, on 21–27 October 2013.

== WTA entrants ==
=== Seeds ===
Country	Player	Rank^{1}	Seed
USA	Irina Falconi	165	1
AUS	Olivia Rogowska	166	2
JPN	Erika Sema	168	3
AUS	Casey Dellacqua	181	4
JPN	Sachie Ishizu	199	5
RUS	Arina Rodionova	201	6
JPN	Yurika Sema	206	7
FRA	Irena Pavlovic	240	8

- ^{1} Rankings as of 14 October 2013

=== Other entrants ===
The following players received wildcards into the singles main draw:

- (Australia) Naiktha Bains
- (Australia) Pamela Boyanov
- (Australia) Isabella Holland
- (Australia) Ashley Keir

The following players received entry from the qualifying draw:

- (New Zealand) Emma Hayman
- (Croatia) Ema Mikulčić
- (Japan) Ayaka Okuno
- (Australia) Karolina Wlodarczak

== Champions ==
=== Singles ===
- (Australia) Casey Dellacqua def. (Thailand) Noppawan Lertcheewakarn 6–4, 6–4

=== Doubles ===
- (Japan) Erika Sema / (Japan) Yurika Sema def. (Australia) Monique Adamczak / (Australia) Olivia Rogowska 3–6, 6–2, [11–9]
