= 2016 Australian Open =

- Date: 18–31 January 2016
- Edition: 104th
- Category: Grand Slam
- Draw: 128S / 64D / 32X
- Prize money: A$44,000,000
- Surface: Hard (Plexicushion)
- Location: Melbourne, Victoria, Australia
- Venue: Melbourne Park
- Attendance: 720,363

Champions

Men's singles
- (Serbia) Novak Djokovic

Women's singles
- (Germany) Angelique Kerber

Men's doubles
- (United Kingdom) Jamie Murray / (Brazil) Bruno Soares

Women's doubles
- (Switzerland) Martina Hingis / (India) Sania Mirza

Mixed doubles
- (Russia) Elena Vesnina / (Brazil) Bruno Soares

Wheelchair men's singles
- (United Kingdom) Gordon Reid

Wheelchair women's singles
- (Netherlands) Jiske Griffioen

Wheelchair quad singles
- (Australia) Dylan Alcott

Wheelchair men's doubles
- (France) Stéphane Houdet / (France) Nicolas Peifer

Wheelchair women's doubles
- (Japan) Yui Kamiji / (Netherlands) Marjolein Buis

Wheelchair quad doubles
- (South Africa) Lucas Sithole / (United States) David Wagner

Boys' singles
- (Australia) Oliver Anderson

Girls' singles
- (Belarus) Vera Lapko

Boys' doubles
- (Australia) Alex de Minaur / (Australia) Blake Ellis

Girls' doubles
- (Russia) Anna Kalinskaya / (Slovakia) Tereza Mihalíková

Men's legends doubles
- (Sweden) Jonas Björkman / (Sweden) Thomas Johansson

Women's legends doubles
- (United States) Lindsay Davenport / (United States) Martina Navratilova
- Australian Open

The 2016 Australian Open was a tennis tournament that took place at Melbourne Park between 18 and 31 January 2016. It was the 104th edition of the Australian Open, and the first Grand Slam tournament of the year. The tournament consisted of events for professional players in singles, doubles and mixed doubles play. Junior and wheelchair players competed in singles and doubles tournaments.

Novak Djokovic successfully defended the men's singles title and thus won a record-equaling sixth Australian Open title. Serena Williams was the defending champion in the women's singles but failed to defend her title, losing to Angelique Kerber in the final; by winning, Kerber became the first German player of any gender to win a Grand Slam title since Steffi Graf won her last such title at the 1999 French Open.

As in previous years, this year's tournament's title sponsor was Kia. This edition set a new attendance record for the tournament of 720,363.

== Tournament ==
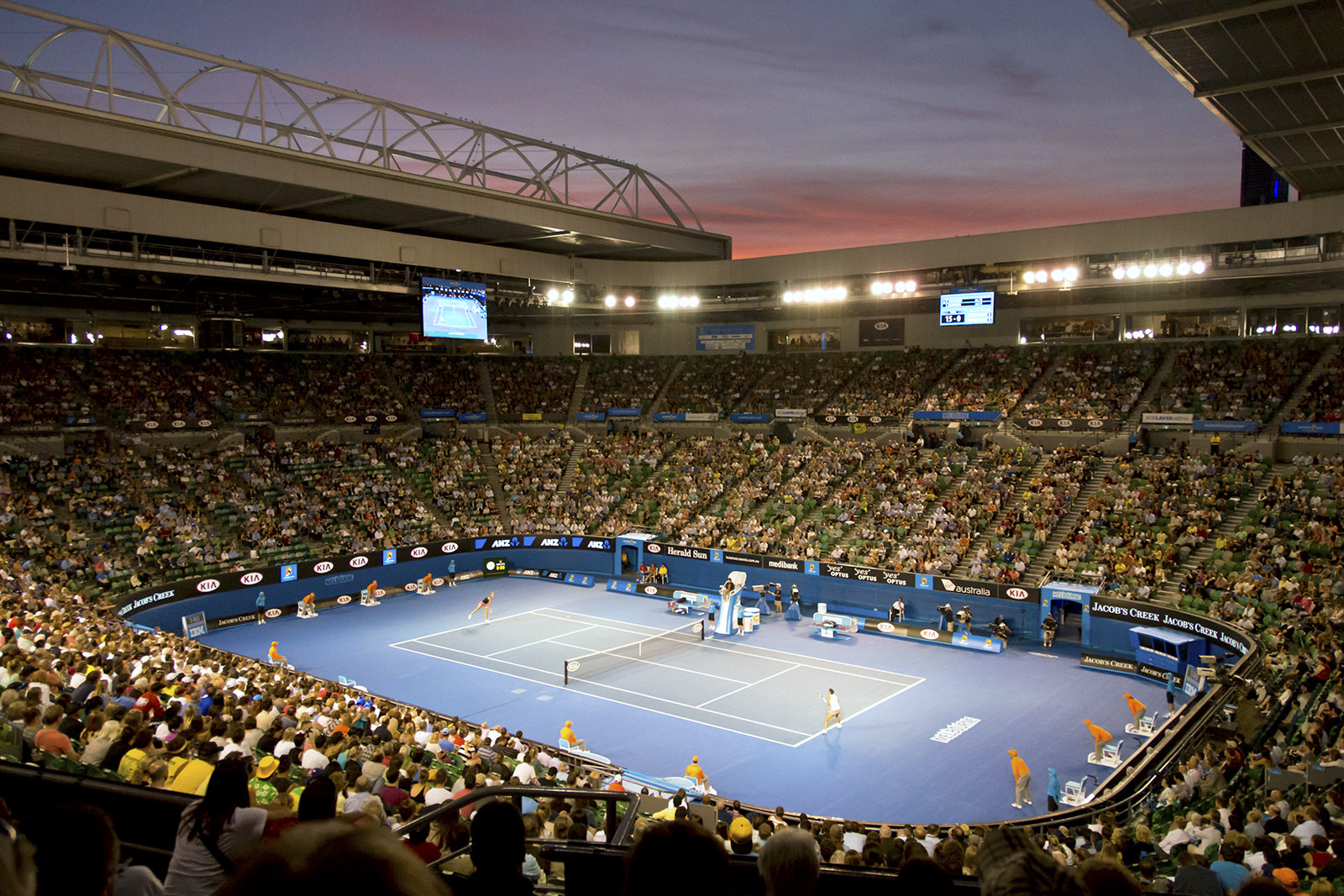
Rod Laver Arena, where the finals of the Australian Open take place

The 2016 Australian Open was the 104th edition of the tournament and was held at Melbourne Park in Melbourne, Victoria, Australia.

The tournament was run by the International Tennis Federation (ITF) and was part of the 2016 ATP World Tour and the 2016 WTA Tour calendars under the Grand Slam category. The tournament consisted of both men's and women's singles and doubles draws as well as a mixed doubles event. There were singles and doubles events for both boys and girls (players under 18), which was part of the Grade A category of tournaments, and also singles, doubles and quad events for men's and women's wheelchair tennis players as part of the NEC tour under the Grand Slam category.

The tournament was played on hard courts and take place over a series of 25 courts, including the three main show courts: Rod Laver Arena, Hisense Arena and Margaret Court Arena.

== Broadcast ==
In Australia, selected key matches were broadcast live by the Seven Network. The majority of matches were shown on the network's primary channel Channel Seven, however during news programming nationwide and most night matches in Perth, coverage shifted to either 7Two or 7mate. Additionally, every match was also available to be streamed live through a free 7Tennis mobile app.

Internationally, ESPN held the rights for America and Central America, broadcasting matches on ESPN2 and ESPN3 in the United States as well as regionally on ESPN International. ESPN also sub-licenses matches to Tennis Channel. Other broadcasters included beIN Sports in the Middle East, SuperSport in Africa, Eurosport through Europe (plus NOS Netherlands and SRG SSR in Switzerland), CCTV, iQiyi and SMG in China, Fiji One in Fiji, Sony ESPN in India, both Wowow and NHK in Japan, Sky in New Zealand and Fox Sports Asia in selected markets in the Asia Pacific region. In Canada, TSN broadcast matches across multiple channels.

== Events ==
=== Spectator safety ===
Spectator safety became a major issue during the tournament, with up to four separate cases reported:

- On Day 2, play was suspended during the fourth set of Bernard Tomic's first round match against Denis Istomin for 20 minutes after an elderly spectator collapsed due to heat stress; she was subsequently treated with an EpiPen and taken away from Hisense Arena.
- On Day 4, Ana Ivanovic's second round match against Anastasija Sevastova was interrupted in the first set when another elderly spectator fell down a set of stairs, delaying play by 25 minutes.
- On Day 6, in the most serious case, Ivanovic was again involved in a match that had to be suspended, after her coach Nigel Sears suffered a heart attack during the second set of her match against Madison Keys. Sears, who is the father-in-law of Andy Murray, had to be stretchered out of the stands and play on Rod Laver Arena was suspended for an hour. Having led by a set and a break at the time, Ivanovic proceeded to lose the match in three sets. Sears was later taken to hospital where he eventually made a full recovery.
- On Day 7, Sam Groth's mother fell down a set of stairs on Hisense Arena during the second set of her son and Lleyton Hewitt's doubles match against Jack Sock and Vasek Pospisil, causing play to be suspended by 20 minutes. She was later able to walk out of the court unassisted.

=== Maria Sharapova doping controversy ===
On 7 March 2016, five weeks after the conclusion of the tournament, world number seven Maria Sharapova announced at a press conference in Los Angeles that she had failed a drug test following her quarter-final defeat by Serena Williams on 26 January. Sharapova confessed to taking the substance meldonium, which was placed on the World Anti-Doping Agency's list of banned substances on 1 January; she was later suspended for two years (later reduced to fifteen months on appeal), backdated to 26 January, and was subsequently docked the $A375,000 she earned for reaching the quarter-finals.

== Point and prize money distribution ==
=== Point distribution ===
Below is a series of tables for each of the competitions showing the ranking points on offer for each event.

==== Senior points ====
Event	W	F	SF	QF	Round of 16	Round of 32	Round of 64	Round of 128	Q	Q3	Q2	Q1
Men's singles	2000	1200	720	360	180	90	45	10	25	16	8	0
Men's doubles	2000	1200	720	360	180	90	0	—N/a	—N/a	—N/a	—N/a	—N/a
Women's singles	2000	1300	780	430	240	130	70	10	40	30	20	2
Women's doubles	2000	1300	780	430	240	130	10	—N/a	—N/a	—N/a	—N/a	—N/a

==== Wheelchair points ====
Event	W	F	SF/3rd	QF/4th
Singles	800	500	375	100
Doubles	800	500	100	—N/a
Quad singles	800	500	100	—N/a
Quad doubles	800	100	—N/a	—N/a

==== Junior points ====
Event	W	F	SF	QF	Round of 16	Round of 32	Q	Q3
Boys' singles	375	270	180	120	75	30	25	20
Girls' singles	375	270	180	120	75	30	25	20
Boys' doubles	270	180	120	75	45	—N/a	—N/a	—N/a
Girls' doubles	270	180	120	75	45	—N/a	—N/a	—N/a

=== Prize money ===
The Australian Open total prize money for 2016 was increased by four million Australian dollars to tournament record A$44,000,000.

Event	W	F	SF	QF	Round of 16	Round of 32	Round of 64	Round of 128^{1}	Q3	Q2	Q1
Singles	A$3,400,000	A$1,700,000	A$750,000	A$375,000	A$193,000	A$108,000	A$67,000	A$38,500	A$20,000	A$12,000	A$6,000
Doubles *	A$635,000	A$315,000	A$157,500	A$78,500	A$43,000	A$25,500	A$16,500	—N/a	—N/a	—N/a	—N/a
Mixed doubles *	A$157,000	A$78,500	A$39,250	A$18,000	A$9,000	A$4,500	—N/a	—N/a	—N/a	—N/a	—N/a

^{1}Qualifiers prize money was also the Round of 128 prize money.
*per team

== Singles players ==
2016 Australian Open – Men's singles

Champion		Runner-up	
(Serbia) Novak Djokovic [1]		(United Kingdom) Andy Murray [2]	
Semifinals out
(Switzerland) Roger Federer [3]		(Canada) Milos Raonic [13]	
Quarterfinals out
(Japan) Kei Nishikori [7]	(Czech Republic) Tomáš Berdych [6]	(France) Gaël Monfils [23]	(Spain) David Ferrer [8]
4th round out
(France) Gilles Simon [14]	(France) Jo-Wilfried Tsonga [9]	(Belgium) David Goffin [15]	(Spain) Roberto Bautista Agut [24]
(Russia) Andrey Kuznetsov	(Switzerland) Stan Wawrinka [4]	(United States) John Isner [10]	(Australia) Bernard Tomic [16]
3rd round out
(Italy) Andreas Seppi [28]	(Argentina) Federico Delbonis	(France) Pierre-Hugues Herbert (Q)	(Spain) Guillermo García López [26]
(Bulgaria) Grigor Dimitrov [27]	(Austria) Dominic Thiem [19]	(Croatia) Marin Čilić [12]	(Australia) Nick Kyrgios [29]
(Israel) Dudi Sela	(France) Stéphane Robert (Q)	(Serbia) Viktor Troicki [21]	(Czech Republic) Lukáš Rosol
(United States) Steve Johnson [31]	(Spain) Feliciano López [18]	(Australia) John Millman	(Portugal) João Sousa [32]
2nd round out
(France) Quentin Halys (WC)	(United States) Denis Kudla	(Argentina) Renzo Olivo (Q)	(Russia) Evgeny Donskoy
(Australia) Omar Jasika (WC)	(United States) Noah Rubin (WC)	(Germany) Daniel Brands (Q)	(United States) Austin Krajicek
(Ukraine) Alexandr Dolgopolov	(Argentina) Marco Trungelliti (Q)	(Spain) Nicolás Almagro	(Bosnia and Herzegovina) Damir Džumhur
(Spain) Albert Ramos	(Serbia) Dušan Lajović	(Uruguay) Pablo Cuevas	(Bosnia and Herzegovina) Mirza Bašić (Q)
(Spain) Fernando Verdasco	(France) Jérémy Chardy [30]	(France) Nicolas Mahut	(United States) Rajeev Ram
(Spain) Tommy Robredo	(United States) Tim Smyczek (Q)	(United States) Jack Sock [25]	(Czech Republic) Radek Štěpánek (Q)
(Australia) Lleyton Hewitt (WC)	(Brazil) Thomaz Bellucci	(Argentina) Guido Pella	(Spain) Marcel Granollers
(Italy) Simone Bolelli	(Luxembourg) Gilles Müller	(Colombia) Santiago Giraldo	(Australia) Sam Groth
1st round out
(South Korea) Chung Hyeon	(Croatia) Ivan Dodig	(Serbia) Filip Krajinović	(Russia) Teymuraz Gabashvili
(Croatia) Ivo Karlović [22]	(Czech Republic) Jiří Veselý	(Spain) Íñigo Cervantes	(Canada) Vasek Pospisil
(Cyprus) Marcos Baghdatis	(Ukraine) Illya Marchenko	(Spain) Pablo Andújar	(France) Benoît Paire [17]
(France) Paul-Henri Mathieu	(Dominican Republic) Víctor Estrella Burgos	(China) Wu Di (Q)	(Germany) Philipp Kohlschreiber
(Georgia (country)) Nikoloz Basilashvili	(Lithuania) Ričardas Berankis	(Slovakia) Jozef Kovalík (Q)	(Italy) Paolo Lorenzi
(Argentina) Leonardo Mayer	(France) Julien Benneteau (PR)	(United Kingdom) Kyle Edmund	(Ukraine) Sergiy Stakhovsky
(Netherlands) Thiemo de Bakker	(Croatia) Borna Ćorić	(United States) Sam Querrey	(Slovakia) Martin Kližan
(Spain) Pablo Carreño	(Japan) Yoshihito Nishioka (WC)	(Netherlands) Robin Haase	(India) Yuki Bhambri
(Spain) Rafael Nadal [5]	(Germany) Benjamin Becker	(United States) Ryan Harrison (Q)	(Latvia) Ernests Gulbis
(Japan) Yūichi Sugita (Q)	(Italy) Marco Cecchinato	(United States) Bjorn Fratangelo (LL)	(South Africa) Kevin Anderson [11]
(France) Lucas Pouille	(Tunisia) Malek Jaziri	(Spain) Daniel Gimeno Traver	(Spain) Daniel Muñoz de la Nava
(United States) Taylor Fritz (Q)	(Japan) Taro Daniel	(Japan) Tatsuma Ito (Q)	(Russia) Dmitry Tursunov (PR)
(Germany) Peter Gojowczyk (Q)	(Australia) James Duckworth (WC)	(Australia) Jordan Thompson (WC)	(United Kingdom) Aljaž Bedene
(United Kingdom) Daniel Evans (Q)	(Belgium) Steve Darcis	(Australia) Matthew Ebden (WC)	(Poland) Jerzy Janowicz
(Uzbekistan) Denis Istomin	(United States) Brian Baker (PR)	(Argentina) Diego Schwartzman	(Italy) Fabio Fognini [20]
(Kazakhstan) Mikhail Kukushkin	(United States) Donald Young	(France) Adrian Mannarino	(Germany) Alexander Zverev

2016 Australian Open – Women's singles

Champion		Runner-up	
(Germany) Angelique Kerber [7]		(United States) Serena Williams [1]	
Semifinals out
(Poland) Agnieszka Radwańska [4]		(United Kingdom) Johanna Konta	
Quarterfinals out
(Russia) Maria Sharapova [5]	(Spain) Carla Suárez Navarro [10]	(Belarus) Victoria Azarenka [14]	(China) Zhang Shuai (Q)
4th round out
(Russia) Margarita Gasparyan	(Switzerland) Belinda Bencic [12]	(Germany) Anna-Lena Friedsam	(Australia) Daria Gavrilova
(Germany) Annika Beck	(Czech Republic) Barbora Strýcová	(Russia) Ekaterina Makarova [21]	(United States) Madison Keys [15]
3rd round out
(Russia) Daria Kasatkina	(Kazakhstan) Yulia Putintseva	(Ukraine) Kateryna Bondarenko	(United States) Lauren Davis
(Puerto Rico) Monica Puig	(Italy) Roberta Vinci [13]	(Russia) Elizaveta Kulichkova	(France) Kristina Mladenovic [28]
(United States) Madison Brengle	(Germany) Laura Siegemund	(Japan) Naomi Osaka (Q)	(Spain) Garbiñe Muguruza [3]
(Czech Republic) Denisa Allertová	(Czech Republic) Karolína Plíšková [9]	(Serbia) Ana Ivanovic [20]	(United States) Varvara Lepchenko
2nd round out
(Chinese Taipei) Hsieh Su-wei	(Croatia) Ana Konjuh	(Japan) Kurumi Nara	(China) Han Xinyun (WC)
(Hungary) Tímea Babos	(Russia) Svetlana Kuznetsova [23]	(Slovakia) Magdaléna Rybáriková	(Belarus) Aliaksandra Sasnovich
(Canada) Eugenie Bouchard	(Czech Republic) Kristýna Plíšková (Q)	(China) Wang Qiang (Q)	(United States) Irina Falconi
(Greece) Maria Sakkari (Q)	(Romania) Monica Niculescu	(United States) Nicole Gibbs (Q)	(Czech Republic) Petra Kvitová [6]
(Romania) Alexandra Dulgheru	(Sweden) Johanna Larsson	(Serbia) Jelena Janković [19]	(Switzerland) Timea Bacsinszky [11]
(Montenegro) Danka Kovinić	(Ukraine) Elina Svitolina [18]	(United States) Vania King (PR)	(Belgium) Kirsten Flipkens
(China) Zheng Saisai	(Germany) Sabine Lisicki [30]	(Germany) Tatjana Maria	(Germany) Julia Görges
(Kazakhstan) Yaroslava Shvedova	(Latvia) Anastasija Sevastova (Q)	(Spain) Lara Arruabarrena	(France) Alizé Cornet
1st round out
(Italy) Camila Giorgi	(Latvia) Jeļena Ostapenko	(Poland) Urszula Radwańska	(Slovakia) Anna Karolína Schmiedlová [27]
(Italy) Sara Errani [17]	(France) Océane Dodin (WC)	(Colombia) Mariana Duque	(Denmark) Caroline Wozniacki [16]
(United States) Alison Riske	(United Kingdom) Heather Watson	(Australia) Ajla Tomljanović	(Slovakia) Daniela Hantuchová
(Russia) Anastasia Pavlyuchenkova [26]	(Belgium) Yanina Wickmayer	(Russia) Evgeniya Rodina	(Japan) Nao Hibino
(United States) Christina McHale	(Serbia) Aleksandra Krunić	(Poland) Magda Linette	(Australia) Samantha Stosur [25]
(United States) Sloane Stephens [24]	(Spain) Lourdes Domínguez Lino	(United States) Anna Tatishvili	(Austria) Tamira Paszek (Q)
(Switzerland) Viktorija Golubic (Q)	(China) Wang Yafan (Q)	(Brazil) Teliana Pereira	(Germany) Andrea Petkovic [22]
(Slovakia) Dominika Cibulková	(Czech Republic) Klára Koukalová	(Czech Republic) Lucie Hradecká	(Thailand) Luksika Kumkhum (Q)
(Japan) Misaki Doi	(Australia) Storm Sanders (WC)	(United States) CoCo Vandeweghe	(Romania) Irina-Camelia Begu [29]
(Slovenia) Polona Hercog	(Netherlands) Kiki Bertens	(Australia) Priscilla Hon (WC)	(Czech Republic) Kateřina Siniaková
(Belgium) Alison Van Uytvanck	(United States) Samantha Crawford (WC)	(Croatia) Donna Vekić	(United States) Victoria Duval (PR)
(France) Caroline Garcia [32]	(Germany) Mona Barthel	(Croatia) Mirjana Lučić-Baroni	(Estonia) Anett Kontaveit
(United States) Venus Williams [8]	(Germany) Carina Witthöft	(United States) Bethanie Mattek-Sands	(Czech Republic) Petra Cetkovská (PR)
(Australia) Maddison Inglis (WC)	(Belarus) Olga Govortsova	(Romania) Andreea Mitu	(Australia) Kimberly Birrell (WC)
(Kazakhstan) Zarina Diyas	(Bulgaria) Tsvetana Pironkova	(Australia) Jarmila Wolfe	(Australia) Tammi Patterson (WC)
(Ukraine) Lesia Tsurenko [31]	(Ukraine) Maryna Zanevska (Q)	(Serbia) Bojana Jovanovski	(Romania) Simona Halep [2]

== Champions ==
=== Seniors ===
==== Men's singles ====
- (Serbia) Novak Djokovic defeated (United Kingdom) Andy Murray, 6–1, 7–5, 7–6^{(7–3)}

Djokovic and Murray had faced one another 30 times prior to the final, with Djokovic victorious on 21 occasions. Murray had lost four Australian Open finals, three times to Djokovic, while the Serb had won the title five times. After an even first game, Djokovic broke Murray twice to lead 5–0, before Murray held. Djokovic took the winning game to secure the first set 6–1 in 30 minutes. The second set went with serve until Djokovic broke Murray to lead 4–3. The Scot broke back immediately and held his serve, but Djokovic broke in the eleventh game, then went on to hold serve, taking the second set 7–5. Djokovic broke the Murray serve in the first game of the third set, but Murray broke back to restore parity in the set at 3–3. The subsequent games went with serve and sent the set to a tie-break. Djokovic led 3–0 and 6–1 before finally securing the championship victory by three sets to love, with a 7–3 tie-break victory.

==== Women's singles ====
- (Germany) Angelique Kerber defeated (United States) Serena Williams, 6–4, 3–6, 6–4

Going into the final, Kerber and Williams had faced each other six times with Williams holding a 5–1 advantage. Kerber broke Williams in the third game of the first set with Williams breaking back to make it 3–3. Kerber immediately broke back and held serve to win the first set 6–4. Williams took advantage of the third of three break points in the fourth game of the second set, the remainder of the set going with serve, leveling the match at one set all. Kerber broke Williams in the second game of the final set, but Williams immediately broke back and held her own serve to level the deciding set at 2–2. Another break for Kerber saw her leading 5–2 but Williams broke back once again, taking the set to 5–4 to Kerber. A cross-court exchange described as "breathtaking" saw Williams hit the ball long, securing the title for Kerber.

==== Men's doubles ====
- (United Kingdom) Jamie Murray / (Brazil) Bruno Soares defeated (Canada) Daniel Nestor / (Czech Republic) Radek Štěpánek, 2–6, 6–4, 7–5

==== Women's doubles ====
- (Switzerland) Martina Hingis / (India) Sania Mirza defeated (Czech Republic) Andrea Hlaváčková / (Czech Republic) Lucie Hradecká, 7–6^{(7–1)}, 6–3

==== Mixed doubles ====
- (Russia) Elena Vesnina / (Brazil) Bruno Soares defeated (United States) CoCo Vandeweghe / (Romania) Horia Tecău, 6–4, 4–6, [10–5]

=== Juniors ===
==== Boys' singles ====
- (Australia) Oliver Anderson defeated (Uzbekistan) Jurabek Karimov, 6–2, 1–6, 6–1

==== Girls' singles ====
- (Belarus) Vera Lapko defeated (Slovakia) Tereza Mihalíková, 6–3, 6–4

==== Boys' doubles ====
- (Australia) Alex de Minaur / (Australia) Blake Ellis defeated (Slovakia) Lukáš Klein / (Czech Republic) Patrik Rikl, 3–6, 7–5, [12–10]

==== Girls' doubles ====
- (Russia) Anna Kalinskaya / (Slovakia) Tereza Mihalíková defeated (Ukraine) Dayana Yastremska / (Ukraine) Anastasia Zarytska, 6–1, 6–1

=== Legends ===
==== Men's Legends doubles ====
- (Sweden) Jonas Björkman / (Sweden) Thomas Johansson defeated (Sweden) Thomas Enqvist / (Sweden) Magnus Norman, 4–3^{(5–4)}, 1–4, 4–3^{(5–3)}

=== Wheelchair events ===
==== Wheelchair men's singles ====
- (United Kingdom) Gordon Reid defeated (Belgium) Joachim Gérard, 7–6^{(9–7)}, 6–4

==== Wheelchair women's singles ====
- (Netherlands) Jiske Griffioen defeated (Netherlands) Aniek van Koot, 6–3, 7–5

==== Wheelchair quad singles ====
- (Australia) Dylan Alcott defeated (United States) David Wagner, 6–2, 6–2

==== Wheelchair men's doubles ====
- (France) Stéphane Houdet / (France) Nicolas Peifer defeated (United Kingdom) Gordon Reid / (Japan) Shingo Kunieda, 6–3, 3–6, 7–5

==== Wheelchair women's doubles ====
- (Netherlands) Marjolein Buis / (Japan) Yui Kamiji defeated (Netherlands) Jiske Griffioen / (Netherlands) Aniek van Koot, 6–2, 6–2

==== Wheelchair quad doubles ====
- (South Africa) Lucas Sithole / (United States) David Wagner defeated (Australia) Dylan Alcott / (United Kingdom) Andrew Lapthorne, 6–1, 6–3

== Singles seeds ==
The following are the seeded players and notable players who withdrew from the event. Seeding are arranged according to ATP and WTA rankings on 11 January 2016, while ranking and points before are as of 18 January 2016.

=== Men's singles ===
Seed	Rank	Player	Points before	Points defending	Points won	Points after	Status
1	1	(Serbia) Novak Djokovic	16,790	2,000	2,000	16,790	Champion, defeated (United Kingdom) Andy Murray [2]
2	2	(United Kingdom) Andy Murray	8,945	1,200	1,200	8,945	Runner-up, lost to (Serbia) Novak Djokovic [1]
3	3	(Switzerland) Roger Federer	8,165	90	720	8,795	Semifinals lost to (Serbia) Novak Djokovic [1]
4	4	(Switzerland) Stan Wawrinka	6,865	720	180	6,325	Fourth round lost to (Canada) Milos Raonic [13]
5	5	(Spain) Rafael Nadal	5,230	360	10	4,880	First round lost to (Spain) Fernando Verdasco
6	6	(Czech Republic) Tomáš Berdych	4,560	720	360	4,200	Quarterfinals lost to (Switzerland) Roger Federer [3]
7	7	(Japan) Kei Nishikori	4,235	360	360	4,235	Quarterfinals lost to (Serbia) Novak Djokovic [1]
8	8	(Spain) David Ferrer	4,145	180	360	4,325	Quarterfinals lost to (United Kingdom) Andy Murray [2]
9	10	(France) Jo-Wilfried Tsonga	2,725	0	180	2,905	Fourth round lost to (Japan) Kei Nishikori [7]
10	11	(United States) John Isner	2,495	90	180	2,585	Fourth round lost to (Spain) David Ferrer [8]
11	12	(South Africa) Kevin Anderson	2,475	180	10	2,305	First round retired vs. (United States) Rajeev Ram
12	13	(Croatia) Marin Čilić	2,405	0	90	2,495	Third round lost to (Spain) Roberto Bautista Agut [24]
13	14	(Canada) Milos Raonic	2,270	360	720	2,630	Semifinals lost to (United Kingdom) Andy Murray [2]
14	15	(France) Gilles Simon	2,145	90	180	2,235	Fourth round lost to (Serbia) Novak Djokovic [1]
15	16	(Belgium) David Goffin	1,835	45	180	1,970	Fourth round lost to (Switzerland) Roger Federer [3]
16	17	(Australia) Bernard Tomic	1,720	180	180	1,720	Fourth round lost to (United Kingdom) Andy Murray [2]
17	18	(France) Benoît Paire	1,703	27	10	1,686	First round lost to (United States) Noah Rubin [WC]
18	19	(Spain) Feliciano López	1,690	180	90	1,600	Third round lost to (United States) John Isner [10]
19	20	(Austria) Dominic Thiem	1,645	10	90	1,725	Third round lost to (Belgium) David Goffin [15]
20	23	(Italy) Fabio Fognini	1,515	10	10	1,515	First round lost to (Luxembourg) Gilles Müller
21	26	(Serbia) Viktor Troicki	1,475	90	90	1,475	Third round lost to (Canada) Milos Raonic [13]
22	24	(Croatia) Ivo Karlović	1,485	45	10	1,450	First round retired vs. (Argentina) Federico Delbonis
23	25	(France) Gaël Monfils	1,485	45	360	1,800	Quarterfinals lost to (Canada) Milos Raonic [13]
24	21	(Spain) Roberto Bautista Agut	1,640	45	180	1,775	Fourth round lost to (Czech Republic) Tomáš Berdych [6]
25	22	(United States) Jack Sock	1,525	0	45	1,570	Second round lost to (Czech Republic) Lukáš Rosol
26	27	(Spain) Guillermo García López	1,430	180	90	1,340	Third round lost to (Japan) Kei Nishikori [7]
27	28	(Bulgaria) Grigor Dimitrov	1,420	180	90	1,330	Third round lost to (Switzerland) Roger Federer [3]
28	29	(Italy) Andreas Seppi	1,290	180	90	1,200	Third round lost to (Serbia) Novak Djokovic [1]
29	30	(Australia) Nick Kyrgios	1,260	360	90	990	Third round lost to (Czech Republic) Tomáš Berdych [6]
30	31	(France) Jérémy Chardy	1,255	45	45	1,255	Second round lost to (Russia) Andrey Kuznetsov
31	32	(United States) Steve Johnson	1,240	90	90	1,240	Third round lost to (Spain) David Ferrer [8]
32	33	(Portugal) João Sousa	1,191	90	90	1,191	Third round lost to (United Kingdom) Andy Murray [2]

The following player would have been seeded, but he withdrew from the event.

Rank	Player	Points Before	Points defending	Points After	Withdrawal reason
9	(France) Richard Gasquet	2,850	90	2,760	Back injury

=== Women's singles ===
Seed	Rank	Player	Points Before	Points defending	Points won	Points After	Status
1	1	(United States) Serena Williams	9,945	2,000	1,300	9,245	Runner-up, lost to (Germany) Angelique Kerber [7]
2	2	(Romania) Simona Halep	5,965	430	10	5,545	First round lost to (China) Zhang Shuai [Q]
3	3	(Spain) Garbiñe Muguruza	5,101	240	130	4,991	Third round lost to (Czech Republic) Barbora Strýcová
4	4	(Poland) Agnieszka Radwańska	4,670	240	780	5,210	Semifinals lost to (United States) Serena Williams [1]
5	5	(Russia) Maria Sharapova	4,542	1,300	430	3,672	Quarterfinals lost to (United States) Serena Williams [1]
6	7	(Czech Republic) Petra Kvitová	3,642	130	70	3,582	Second round lost to (Australia) Daria Gavrilova
7	6	(Germany) Angelique Kerber	3,710	10	2,000	5,700	Champion, defeated (United States) Serena Williams [1]
8	10	(United States) Venus Williams	3,511	430	10	3,091	First round lost to (United Kingdom) Johanna Konta
9	12	(Czech Republic) Karolína Plíšková	3,090	130	130	3,090	Third round lost to (Russia) Ekaterina Makarova [21]
10	11	(Spain) Carla Suárez Navarro	3,175	10	430	3,595	Quarterfinals lost to (Poland) Agnieszka Radwańska [4]
11	14	(Switzerland) Timea Bacsinszky	2,954	130	70	2,894	Second round lost to (Germany) Annika Beck
12	13	(Switzerland) Belinda Bencic	3,030	10	240	3,260	Fourth round lost vs. (Russia) Maria Sharapova [5]
13	15	(Italy) Roberta Vinci	2,825	70	130	2,885	Third round lost to (Germany) Anna-Lena Friedsam
14	16	(Belarus) Victoria Azarenka	2,745	240	430	2,935	Quarterfinals lost to (Germany) Angelique Kerber [7]
15	17	(United States) Madison Keys	2,600	780	240	2,060	Fourth round lost to (China) Zhang Shuai [Q]
16	18	(Denmark) Caroline Wozniacki	2,571	70	10	2,511	First round lost to (Kazakhstan) Yulia Putintseva
17	19	(Italy) Sara Errani	2,525	130	10	2,405	First round lost to (Russia) Margarita Gasparyan
18	21	(Ukraine) Elina Svitolina	2,465	130	70	2,405	Second round lost to (Japan) Naomi Osaka [Q]
19	22	(Serbia) Jelena Janković	2,445	10	70	2,505	Second round lost to (Germany) Laura Siegemund
20	23	(Serbia) Ana Ivanovic	2,341	10	130	2,461	Third round lost to (United States) Madison Keys [15]
21	24	(Russia) Ekaterina Makarova	2,300	780	240	1,760	Fourth round lost to (United Kingdom) Johanna Konta
22	25	(Germany) Andrea Petkovic	2,230	10	10	2,230	First round lost to (Russia) Elizaveta Kulichkova
23	20	(Russia) Svetlana Kuznetsova	2,475	10	70	2,535	Second round lost to (Ukraine) Kateryna Bondarenko
24	26	(United States) Sloane Stephens	1,965	10	10	1,965	First round lost to (China) Wang Qiang [Q]
25	27	(Australia) Samantha Stosur	1,935	70	10	1,875	First round lost to (Czech Republic) Kristýna Plíšková [Q]
26	28	(Russia) Anastasia Pavlyuchenkova	1,880	10	10	1,880	First round lost to (United States) Lauren Davis
27	29	(Slovakia) Anna Karolína Schmiedlová	1,875	70	10	1,815	First round lost to (Russia) Daria Kasatkina
28	30	(France) Kristina Mladenovic	1,725	70	130	1,785	Third round lost to (Australia) Daria Gavrilova
29	31	(Romania) Irina-Camelia Begu	1,630	240	10	1,400	First round lost to (Sweden) Johanna Larsson
30	32	(Germany) Sabine Lisicki	1,622	10	70	1,682	Second round lost to (Czech Republic) Denisa Allertová
31	35	(Ukraine) Lesia Tsurenko	1,398	10	10	1,398	First round lost to (United States) Varvara Lepchenko
32	34	(France) Caroline Garcia	1,420	130	10	1,300	First round lost to (Czech Republic) Barbora Strýcová

The following players would have been seeded, but they withdrew or not entered from the event.

Rank	Player	Points Before	Points defending	Points After	Withdrawal reason
8	(Italy) Flavia Pennetta	3,621	10	3,611	Retirement from tennis
9	(Czech Republic) Lucie Šafářová	3,590	10	3,580	Bacterial infection

== Doubles seeds ==
=== Men's doubles ===
Team		Rank^{1}	Seed
(Netherlands) Jean-Julien Rojer	(Romania) Horia Tecău	5	1
(Croatia) Ivan Dodig	(Brazil) Marcelo Melo	7	2
(United States) Bob Bryan	(United States) Mike Bryan	9	3
(India) Rohan Bopanna	(Romania) Florin Mergea	20	4
(Italy) Simone Bolelli	(Italy) Fabio Fognini	23	5
(France) Pierre-Hugues Herbert	(France) Nicolas Mahut	26	6
(United Kingdom) Jamie Murray	(Brazil) Bruno Soares	29	7
(Finland) Henri Kontinen	(Australia) John Peers	38	8
(Canada) Vasek Pospisil	(United States) Jack Sock	40	9
(Poland) Łukasz Kubot	(Poland) Marcin Matkowski	45	10
(United Kingdom) Dominic Inglot	(Sweden) Robert Lindstedt	49	11
(Colombia) Juan Sebastián Cabal	(Colombia) Robert Farah	52	12
(South Africa) Raven Klaasen	(United States) Rajeev Ram	56	13
(Philippines) Treat Huey	(Belarus) Max Mirnyi	62	14
(Spain) Feliciano López	(Spain) Marc López	64	15
(Uruguay) Pablo Cuevas	(Spain) Marcel Granollers	73	16

- ^{1} Rankings were as of 11 January 2016.

=== Women's doubles ===
Team		Rank^{1}	Seed
(Switzerland) Martina Hingis	(India) Sania Mirza	3	1
(Chinese Taipei) Chan Hao-ching	(Chinese Taipei) Chan Yung-jan	19	2
(France) Caroline Garcia	(France) Kristina Mladenovic	24	3
(Hungary) Tímea Babos	(Slovenia) Katarina Srebotnik	26	4
(Russia) Anastasia Pavlyuchenkova	(Russia) Elena Vesnina	35	5
(United States) Raquel Atawo	(United States) Abigail Spears	36	6
(Czech Republic) Andrea Hlaváčková	(Czech Republic) Lucie Hradecká	37	7
(Spain) Lara Arruabarrena	(Slovenia) Andreja Klepač	56	8
(Romania) Irina-Camelia Begu	(Romania) Monica Niculescu	60	9
(Spain) Anabel Medina Garrigues	(Spain) Arantxa Parra Santonja	65	10
(Kazakhstan) Yaroslava Shvedova	(Australia) Samantha Stosur	66	11
(Germany) Anna-Lena Grönefeld	(United States) CoCo Vandeweghe	73	12
(Germany) Julia Görges	(Czech Republic) Karolína Plíšková	75	13
(Netherlands) Kiki Bertens	(Sweden) Johanna Larsson	75	14
(China) Xu Yifan	(China) Zheng Saisai	80	15
(Canada) Gabriela Dabrowski	(Poland) Alicja Rosolska	88	16

- ^{1} Rankings were as of 11 January 2016.

=== Mixed doubles ===
Team		Rank^{1}	Seed
(India) Sania Mirza	(Croatia) Ivan Dodig	7	1
(United States) Bethanie Mattek-Sands	(United States) Bob Bryan	7	2
(Chinese Taipei) Chan Yung-jan	(India) Rohan Bopanna	16	3
(Slovenia) Katarina Srebotnik	(United Kingdom) Jamie Murray	23	4
(Russia) Elena Vesnina	(Brazil) Bruno Soares	30	5
(Czech Republic) Lucie Hradecká	(Poland) Marcin Matkowski	33	6
(United States) Raquel Atawo	(South Africa) Raven Klaasen	39	7
(Chinese Taipei) Chan Hao-ching	(Belarus) Max Mirnyi	41	8

- ^{1} Rankings were as of 18 January 2016.

== Main draw wildcard entries ==
=== Men's singles ===
- (Australia) James Duckworth
- (Australia) Matthew Ebden
- (France) Quentin Halys
- (Australia) Lleyton Hewitt
- (Australia) Omar Jasika
- (Japan) Yoshihito Nishioka
- (United States) Noah Rubin
- (Australia) Jordan Thompson

=== Women's singles ===
- (Australia) Kimberly Birrell
- (United States) Samantha Crawford
- (France) Océane Dodin
- (China) Han Xinyun
- (Australia) Priscilla Hon
- (Australia) Maddison Inglis
- (Australia) Tammi Patterson
- (Australia) Storm Sanders

=== Men's doubles ===
- (Australia) Alex Bolt / (Australia) Andrew Whittington
- (Australia) James Duckworth / (Australia) John Millman
- (Australia) Sam Groth / (Australia) Lleyton Hewitt
- (Chinese Taipei) Hsieh Cheng-peng / (Chinese Taipei) Yang Tsung-hua
- (Australia) Omar Jasika / (Australia) Nick Kyrgios
- (United States) Austin Krajicek / (United States) Donald Young
- (Australia) Luke Saville / (Australia) John-Patrick Smith

=== Women's doubles ===
- (Japan) Shuko Aoyama / (Japan) Makoto Ninomiya
- (Australia) Alison Bai / (Australia) Naiktha Bains
- (Australia) Kimberly Birrell / (Australia) Priscilla Hon
- ~~(Slovakia) Daniela Hantuchová~~ / ~~(Australia) Jarmila Wolfe~~ (withdrew)
- (Australia) Jessica Moore / (Australia) Storm Sanders
- (Australia) Tammi Patterson / (Australia) Olivia Rogowska
- (Australia) Ellen Perez / (Australia) Belinda Woolcock

=== Mixed doubles ===
- (Australia) Kimberly Birrell / (Australia) John Millman
- (Australia) Daria Gavrilova / (Australia) Luke Saville
- (Australia) Maddison Inglis / (Australia) Benjamin Mitchell
- (Australia) Jessica Moore / (Australia) Marc Polmans
- (Australia) Anastasia Rodionova / (Australia) Chris Guccione
- (Australia) Arina Rodionova / (Australia) Matt Reid
- (Australia) Ajla Tomljanović / (Australia) Nick Kyrgios
- (China) Zheng Saisai / (South Korea) Chung Hyeon

== Main draw qualifier entries ==
The qualifying competition took place in Melbourne Park on 13 – 16 January 2016.

=== Men's singles ===
- (United Kingdom) Daniel Evans
- (Slovakia) Jozef Kovalík
- (United States) Tim Smyczek
- (China) Wu Di
- (Czech Republic) Radek Štěpánek
- (Bosnia and Herzegovina) Mirza Bašić
- (United States) Ryan Harrison
- (Germany) Peter Gojowczyk
- (United States) Taylor Fritz
- (Germany) Daniel Brands
- (France) Pierre-Hugues Herbert
- (Japan) Yūichi Sugita
- (Japan) Tatsuma Ito
- (France) Stéphane Robert
- (Argentina) Marco Trungelliti
- (Argentina) Renzo Olivo

==== Lucky loser ====
- (United States) Bjorn Fratangelo

=== Women's singles ===
- (China) Wang Qiang
- (United States) Nicole Gibbs
- (China) Wang Yafan
- (Japan) Naomi Osaka
- (Latvia) Anastasija Sevastova
- (China) Zhang Shuai
- (Czech Republic) Kristýna Plíšková
- (Switzerland) Viktorija Golubic
- (Thailand) Luksika Kumkhum
- (Ukraine) Maryna Zanevska
- (Greece) Maria Sakkari
- (Austria) Tamira Paszek

== Protected ranking ==
The following players were accepted directly into the main draw using a protected ranking:

Men's singles

- (France) Julien Benneteau (39)
- (United States) Brian Baker (56)
- (Russia) Dmitry Tursunov (89)

Women's singles

- (Czech Republic) Petra Cetkovská (54)
- (United States) Vania King (73)

== Withdrawals ==
The following players were accepted directly into the main tournament, but withdrew with injuries and personal reasons.

Before the tournament

Men's singles

- ‡ (Argentina) Juan Mónaco (53) → replaced by (Israel) Dudi Sela (100)
- ‡ (Australia) Thanasi Kokkinakis (80) → replaced by (Serbia) Filip Krajinović (101)
- ‡ (France) Richard Gasquet (9) → replaced by (United Kingdom) Kyle Edmund (102)
- ‡ (Serbia) Janko Tipsarević (39 PR) → replaced by (Tunisia) Malek Jaziri (103)
- ‡ (Germany) Tommy Haas (25 PR) → replaced by (Georgia (country)) Nikoloz Basilashvili (104)
- ‡ (Austria) Andreas Haider-Maurer (63) → replaced by (United States) Austin Krajicek (105)
- § (Chinese Taipei) Lu Yen-hsun (77) → replaced by (United States) Bjorn Fratangelo (LL)

Women's singles

- † (Italy) Flavia Pennetta (8) → replaced by (Croatia) Donna Vekić (104)
- ‡ (Kazakhstan) Galina Voskoboeva (64 PR) → replaced by (Netherlands) Kiki Bertens (105)
- ‡ (Czech Republic) Lucie Šafářová (9) → replaced by (Australia) Jarmila Wolfe (106)
- ‡ (Russia) Alisa Kleybanova (90 PR) → replaced by (Russia) Elizaveta Kulichkova (107)
- ‡ (Italy) Karin Knapp (51) → replaced by (Belarus) Aliaksandra Sasnovich (108)

† – not included on entry list
‡ – withdrew from entry list
§ – withdrew from main draw

== Retirements ==
Men's singles

- (South Africa) Kevin Anderson
- (Croatia) Ivo Karlović
- (Serbia) Filip Krajinović
- (United States) Sam Querrey
- (Russia) Dmitry Tursunov

Women's singles

- (Colombia) Mariana Duque Mariño
- (Russia) Elizaveta Kulichkova
- (Slovakia) Magdaléna Rybáriková
- (Australia) Jarmila Wolfe

Preceded by 2015 US Open	Grand Slams	Succeeded by 2016 French Open
