= 2016 Australian Open – Women's singles =

Women's singles
- 2016 Australian Open

Final
- Champion: (Germany) Angelique Kerber
- Runner-up: (United States) Serena Williams
- Score: 6–4, 3–6, 6–4

Details
- Draw: 128 (12Q / 8WC)
- Seeds: 32

Events
Singles	men	women		boys	girls
Doubles	men	women	mixed	boys	girls
WC Singles	men	women	quad
WC Doubles	men	women	quad
Legends	men	women	mixed
- Australian Open

Angelique Kerber defeated defending champion Serena Williams in the final, 6–4, 3–6, 6–4 to win the women's singles tennis title at the 2016 Australian Open. It was her first major title. Kerber saved a match point en route to the title, in the first round against Misaki Doi; she was the first woman to win a singles major after saving a match point in the first round. She was also the first German to win a major since Steffi Graf at the 1999 French Open. Williams' loss also ended her eight-match winning streak in major finals.

The top three seeds (S. Williams, Simona Halep and Garbiñe Muguruza) were in contention for the world No. 1 ranking. Williams retained the top spot after Halep and Muguruza were eliminated in the first and third rounds, respectively.

The twelve seeds that lost in the opening round were the most to do so at any major since the 32-seed draw was adopted at the 2001 Wimbledon Championships.

Zhang Shuai became the first qualifier to reach the quarterfinals since Angélica Gavaldón in 1990. Zhang also won her first main draw major match in her 15th main draw appearance.

This was the first major appearance for future two-time champion and world No. 1 Naomi Osaka, who lost to Victoria Azarenka in the third round. This was the final Australian Open appearance of 2008 finalist and former world No. 1 Ana Ivanovic, who lost to Madison Keys in the third round. It was also the last professional event for former world No. 1 Maria Sharapova until the 2017 Porsche Tennis Grand Prix: Sharapova failed a drug test at this tournament, testing positive for the banned substance meldonium, and was suspended from professional tennis for 15 months as a result. She lost here in the quarterfinals to Williams, in a rematch of the previous year's final.

== Seeds ==
1. (United States) Serena Williams (final)
2. (Romania) Simona Halep (first round)
3. (Spain) Garbiñe Muguruza (third round)
4. (Poland) Agnieszka Radwańska (semifinals)
5. (Russia) Maria Sharapova (quarterfinals)
6. (Czech Republic) Petra Kvitová (second round)
7. (Germany) Angelique Kerber (champion)
8. (United States) Venus Williams (first round)
9. (Czech Republic) Karolína Plíšková (third round)
10. (Spain) Carla Suárez Navarro (quarterfinals)
11. (Switzerland) Timea Bacsinszky (second round)
12. (Switzerland) Belinda Bencic (fourth round)
13. (Italy) Roberta Vinci (third round)
14. (Belarus) Victoria Azarenka (quarterfinals)
15. (United States) Madison Keys (fourth round)
16. (Denmark) Caroline Wozniacki (first round)

17. (Italy) Sara Errani (first round)
18. (Ukraine) Elina Svitolina (second round)
19. (Serbia) Jelena Janković (second round)
20. (Serbia) Ana Ivanovic (third round)
21. (Russia) Ekaterina Makarova (fourth round)
22. (Germany) Andrea Petkovic (first round)
23. (Russia) Svetlana Kuznetsova (second round)
24. (United States) Sloane Stephens (first round)
25. (Australia) Samantha Stosur (first round)
26. (Russia) Anastasia Pavlyuchenkova (first round)
27. (Slovakia) Anna Karolína Schmiedlová (first round)
28. (France) Kristina Mladenovic (third round)
29. (Romania) Irina-Camelia Begu (first round)
30. (Germany) Sabine Lisicki (second round)
31. (Ukraine) Lesia Tsurenko (first round)
32. (France) Caroline Garcia (first round)

Click on the seed number of a player to go to their draw section.

== Draw ==
Key

- Q = Qualifier
- WC = Wild card
- LL = Lucky loser
- Alt = Alternate
- ITF = ITF entry
- PR = Protected ranking
- SR = Special ranking
- SE = Special exempt
- JE = Junior exempt
- JR = Junior Accelerator Programme entrant
- CO = College Accelerator Programme entrant
- NG = Next Gen Accelerator Program entrant
- w/o = Walkover
- r = Retired
- d = Defaulted

=== Finals ===
Quarterfinals
1	(United States) Serena Williams	6	6
5	(Russia) Maria Sharapova	4	1
4	(Poland) Agnieszka Radwańska	6	6
10	(Spain) Carla Suárez Navarro	1	3
7	(Germany) Angelique Kerber	6	7
14	(Belarus) Victoria Azarenka	3	5
(United Kingdom) Johanna Konta	6	6
Q	(China) Zhang Shuai	4	1

Semifinals
1	(United States) Serena Williams	6	6
4	(Poland) Agnieszka Radwańska	0	4
7	(Germany) Angelique Kerber	7	6
(United Kingdom) Johanna Konta	5	2

Final
1	(United States) Serena Williams	4	6	4
7	(Germany) Angelique Kerber	6	3	6

=== Top half ===
==== Section 1 ====
First round
1	(United States) S Williams	6	7
(Italy) C Giorgi	4	5
(Chinese Taipei) S-w Hsieh	3	7	6
(Latvia) J Ostapenko	6	5	1
(Poland) U Radwańska	6	4	3
(Croatia) A Konjuh	0	6	6
(Russia) D Kasatkina	6	6
27	(Slovakia) AK Schmiedlová	3	3
17	(Italy) S Errani	6	5	1
(Russia) M Gasparyan	1	7	6
(Japan) K Nara	7^{7}	6
WC	(France) O Dodin	6^{2}	2
(Colombia) M Duque	2	1^{r}
WC	(China) X Han	6	2
(Kazakhstan) Y Putintseva	1	7^{7}	6
16	(Denmark) C Wozniacki	6	6^{3}	4

Second round
1	(United States) S Williams	6	6
(Chinese Taipei) S-w Hsieh	1	2
(Croatia) A Konjuh	4	3
(Russia) D Kasatkina	6	6
(Russia) M Gasparyan	6	6
(Japan) K Nara	4	4
WC	(China) X Han	3	1
(Kazakhstan) Y Putintseva	6	6

Third round
1	(United States) S Williams	6	6
(Russia) D Kasatkina	1	1
(Russia) M Gasparyan	6	6
(Kazakhstan) Y Putintseva	3	4

Fourth round
1	(United States) S Williams	6	6
(Russia) M Gasparyan	2	1

==== Section 2 ====
First round
12	(Switzerland) B Bencic	6	6
(United States) A Riske	4	3
(United Kingdom) H Watson	7^{7}	5	5
(Hungary) T Babos	6^{4}	7	7
(Australia) A Tomljanović	6^{2}	3
(Ukraine) K Bondarenko	7^{7}	6
(Slovakia) D Hantuchová	0	2
23	(Russia) S Kuznetsova	6	6
26	(Russia) A Pavlyuchenkova	6	3	4
(United States) L Davis	1	6	6
(Slovakia) M Rybáriková	3	6	7
(Belgium) Y Wickmayer	6	3	5
(Belarus) A Sasnovich	6	7^{7}
(Russia) E Rodina	3	6^{2}
(Japan) N Hibino	1	3
5	(Russia) M Sharapova	6	6

Second round
12	(Switzerland) B Bencic	6	6
(Hungary) T Babos	3	3
(Ukraine) K Bondarenko	6	7
23	(Russia) S Kuznetsova	1	5
(United States) L Davis	7^{9}	0
(Slovakia) M Rybáriková	6^{7}	0^{r}
(Belarus) A Sasnovich	2	1
5	(Russia) M Sharapova	6	6

Third round
12	(Switzerland) B Bencic	4	6	6
(Ukraine) K Bondarenko	6	2	4
(United States) L Davis	1	7^{7}	0
5	(Russia) M Sharapova	6	6^{5}	6

Fourth round
12	(Switzerland) B Bencic	5	5
5	(Russia) M Sharapova	7	7

==== Section 3 ====
First round
4	(Poland) A Radwańska	6	6
(United States) C McHale	2	3
(Canada) E Bouchard	6	6
(Serbia) A Krunić	3	4
(Poland) M Linette	3	0
(Puerto Rico) M Puig	6	6
Q	(Czech Republic) Kr Plíšková	6	7^{8}
25	(Australia) S Stosur	4	6^{6}
24	(United States) S Stephens	3	3
Q	(China) Q Wang	6	6
(Spain) L Domínguez Lino	6^{3}	6	1
(Germany) A-L Friedsam	7^{7}	2	6
(United States) A Tatishvili	4	6	6
(United States) I Falconi	6	3	8
Q	(Austria) T Paszek	4	2
13	(Italy) R Vinci	6	6

Second round
4	(Poland) A Radwańska	6	6
(Canada) E Bouchard	4	2
(Puerto Rico) M Puig	4	7^{8}	9
Q	(Czech Republic) Kr Plíšková	6	6^{6}	7
Q	(China) Q Wang	3	4
(Germany) A-L Friedsam	6	6
(United States) I Falconi	2	3
13	(Italy) R Vinci	6	6

Third round
4	(Poland) A Radwańska	6	6
(Puerto Rico) M Puig	4	0
(Germany) A-L Friedsam	0	6	6
13	(Italy) R Vinci	6	4	4

Fourth round
4	(Poland) A Radwańska	6^{6}	6	7
(Germany) A-L Friedsam	7^{8}	1	5

==== Section 4 ====
First round
10	(Spain) C Suárez Navarro	7	6
Q	(Switzerland) V Golubic	5	4
Q	(Greece) M Sakkari	6	1	6
Q	(China) Y Wang	4	6	3
(Romania) M Niculescu	6	6
(Brazil) T Pereira	2	1
(Russia) E Kulichkova	7	6
22	(Germany) A Petkovic	5	4
28	(France) K Mladenovic	6	6
(Slovakia) D Cibulková	3	4
Q	(United States) N Gibbs	6	2	6
(Czech Republic) K Koukalová	2	6	1
(Australia) D Gavrilova	7^{7}	6
(Czech Republic) L Hradecká	6^{3}	4
Q	(Thailand) L Kumkhum	3	1
6	(Czech Republic) P Kvitová	6	6

Second round
10	(Spain) C Suárez Navarro	6^{5}	6	6
Q	(Greece) M Sakkari	7^{7}	2	2
(Romania) M Niculescu	4	6	4
(Russia) E Kulichkova	6	2	6
28	(France) K Mladenovic	6	7^{7}
Q	(United States) N Gibbs	1	6^{4}
(Australia) D Gavrilova	6	6
6	(Czech Republic) P Kvitová	4	4

Third round
10	(Spain) C Suárez Navarro	6	2
(Russia) E Kulichkova	4	0^{r}
28	(France) K Mladenovic	4	6	9
(Australia) D Gavrilova	6	4	11

Fourth round
10	(Spain) C Suárez Navarro	0	6	6
(Australia) D Gavrilova	6	3	2

=== Bottom half ===
==== Section 5 ====
First round
7	(Germany) A Kerber	6^{4}	7^{8}	6
(Japan) M Doi	7^{7}	6^{6}	3
WC	(Australia) S Sanders	4	2
(Romania) A Dulgheru	6	6
(United States) M Brengle	6	6
(United States) C Vandeweghe	3	4
(Sweden) J Larsson	6	6
29	(Romania) I-C Begu	3	2
19	(Serbia) J Janković	6	6
(Slovenia) P Hercog	3	3
(Germany) L Siegemund	6	7
(Netherlands) K Bertens	4	5
WC	(Australia) P Hon	0	3
(Germany) A Beck	6	6
(Czech Republic) K Siniaková	3	5
11	(Switzerland) T Bacsinszky	6	7

Second round
7	(Germany) A Kerber	6	6
(Romania) A Dulgheru	2	4
(United States) M Brengle	7	4	6
(Sweden) J Larsson	5	6	1
19	(Serbia) J Janković	6	6^{5}	4
(Germany) L Siegemund	3	7^{7}	6
(Germany) A Beck	6	6
11	(Switzerland) T Bacsinszky	2	3

Third round
7	(Germany) A Kerber	6	6
(United States) M Brengle	1	3
(Germany) L Siegemund	0	4
(Germany) A Beck	6	6

Fourth round
7	(Germany) A Kerber	6	6
(Germany) A Beck	4	0

==== Section 6 ====
First round
14	(Belarus) V Azarenka	6	6
(Belgium) A Van Uytvanck	0	0
WC	(United States) S Crawford	2	4
(Montenegro) D Kovinić	6	6
Q	(Japan) N Osaka	6	6
(Croatia) D Vekić	3	2
PR	(United States) V Duval	2	3
18	(Ukraine) E Svitolina	6	6
32	(France) C Garcia	2	4
(Czech Republic) B Strýcová	6	6
(Germany) M Barthel	6	5	4
PR	(United States) V King	3	7	6
(Belgium) K Flipkens	5	6	7
(Croatia) M Lučić-Baroni	7	2	5
(Estonia) A Kontaveit	0	4
3	(Spain) G Muguruza	6	6

Second round
14	(Belarus) V Azarenka	6	6
(Montenegro) D Kovinić	1	2
Q	(Japan) N Osaka	6	6
18	(Ukraine) E Svitolina	4	4
(Czech Republic) B Strýcová	7^{7}	6
PR	(United States) V King	6^{5}	4
(Belgium) K Flipkens	4	2
3	(Spain) G Muguruza	6	6

Third round
14	(Belarus) V Azarenka	6	6
Q	(Japan) N Osaka	1	1
(Czech Republic) B Strýcová	6	6
3	(Spain) G Muguruza	3	2

Fourth round
14	(Belarus) V Azarenka	6	6
(Czech Republic) B Strýcová	2	4

==== Section 7 ====
First round
8	(United States) V Williams	4	2
(United Kingdom) J Konta	6	6
(Germany) C Witthöft	1	2
(China) S Zheng	6	6
(United States) B Mattek-Sands	4	7^{7}	3
(Czech Republic) D Allertová	6	6^{5}	6
PR	(Czech Republic) P Cetkovská	4	4
30	(Germany) S Lisicki	6	6
21	(Russia) E Makarova	6	6
WC	(Australia) M Inglis	3	0
(Germany) T Maria	6	6
(Belarus) O Govortsova	4	3
(Romania) A Mitu	3	4
(Germany) J Görges	6	6
WC	(Australia) K Birrell	4	4
9	(Czech Republic) Ka Plíšková	6	6

Second round
(United Kingdom) J Konta	6	6
(China) S Zheng	2	3
(Czech Republic) D Allertová	6	2	6
30	(Germany) S Lisicki	3	6	4
21	(Russia) E Makarova	6	6
(Germany) T Maria	4	2
(Germany) J Görges	6^{5}	1
9	(Czech Republic) Ka Plíšková	7^{7}	6

Third round
(United Kingdom) J Konta	6	6
(Czech Republic) D Allertová	2	2
21	(Russia) E Makarova	6	6
9	(Czech Republic) Ka Plíšková	3	2

Fourth round
(United Kingdom) J Konta	4	6	8
21	(Russia) E Makarova	6	4	6

==== Section 8 ====
First round
15	(United States) M Keys	7^{7}	6
(Kazakhstan) Z Diyas	6^{5}	1
(Bulgaria) T Pironkova	4	4
(Kazakhstan) Y Shvedova	6	6
Q	(Latvia) A Sevastova	6	4
(Australia) J Wolfe	0	2^{r}
WC	(Australia) T Patterson	2	3
20	(Serbia) A Ivanovic	6	6
31	(Ukraine) L Tsurenko	7^{7}	2	3
(United States) V Lepchenko	6^{5}	6	6
(Spain) L Arruabarrena	6^{4}	6	6
Q	(Ukraine) M Zanevska	7^{7}	3	3
(Serbia) B Jovanovski	1	0
(France) A Cornet	6	6
Q	(China) S Zhang	6	6
2	(Romania) S Halep	4	3

Second round
15	(United States) M Keys	6^{4}	6	6
(Kazakhstan) Y Shvedova	7^{7}	3	3
Q	(Latvia) A Sevastova	3	3
20	(Serbia) A Ivanovic	6	6
(United States) V Lepchenko	7^{9}	6
(Spain) L Arruabarrena	6^{7}	4
(France) A Cornet	3	3
Q	(China) S Zhang	6	6

Third round
15	(United States) M Keys	4	6	6
20	(Serbia) A Ivanovic	6	4	4
(United States) V Lepchenko	1	3
Q	(China) S Zhang	6	6

Fourth round
15	(United States) M Keys	6	3	3
Q	(China) S Zhang	3	6	6

== Championship match statistics ==
Category	(Germany) Kerber	(United States) S. Williams
1st serve %	44/80 (55%)	51/96 (53%)
1st serve points won	32 of 44 = 73%	35 of 51 = 69%
2nd serve points won	17 of 36 = 47%	19 of 45 = 42%
Total service points won	49 of 80 = 61.25%	54 of 96 = 56.25%
Aces	5	7
Double faults	3	6
Winners	16	36
Unforced errors	13	40
Net points won	4 of 5 = 80%	22 of 39 = 56%
Break points converted	5 of 9 = 56%	4 of 8 = 50%
Return points won	42 of 96 = 44%	31 of 80 = 39%
Total points won	91	85

Preceded by 2015 US Open – Women's singles	Grand Slam women's singles	Succeeded by 2016 French Open – Women's singles
