= Tyra Calderwood =

Australian tennis player

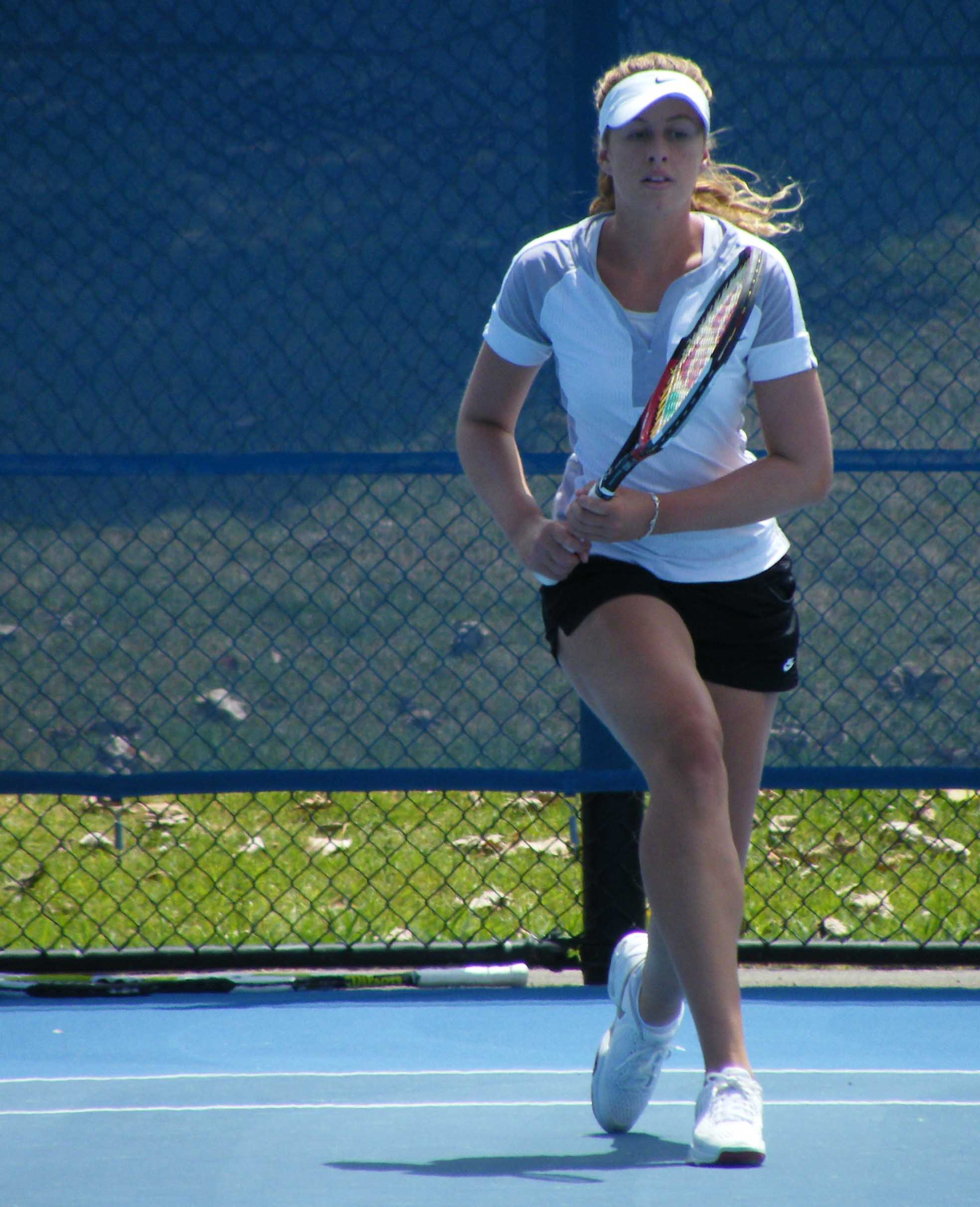
- Calderwood at the 2009 NSW Tennis Open
- Country (sports): Australia
- Residence: Sydney, New South Wales
- Born: 19 September 1990 (age 34); Sydney
- Turned pro: 2007
- Plays: Right-handed (two-handed backhand)
- Prize money: $46,544

Singles
- Career record: 69–108
- Career titles: 0
- Highest ranking: No. 607 (6 October 2008)

Doubles
- Career record: 96–99
- Career titles: 6 ITF
- Highest ranking: No. 190 (10 September 2012)

Grand Slam doubles results
- Australian Open: 1R (2008, 2009, 2012)

Tyra Calderwood (born 19 September 1990) is a former professional Australian tennis player. Her highest WTA singles ranking was 607, which she reached on 6 October 2008. Her career-high in doubles was 190, set on 10 September 2012.

== Early life and junior career ==
Calderwood was born in Sydney and started playing tennis at the age of three.

She has had limited success on the circuit, though her junior ranking did peak at 33 in 2007.

== Career ==
In 2008, she made her WTA Tour doubles debut after being given a wildcard with Alenka Hubacek into the Australian Open. However, they lost in the first round in straight sets. In December of that year, she won the Sorrento ITF doubles title with Shannon Golds.

In 2009, she received wildcards into the doubles tournaments at both the Sydney International and the Australian Open, losing first round in both tournaments.

== ITF Circuit finals ==
=== Doubles: 14 (6–8) ===
$100,000 tournaments
$75,000 tournaments
$50,000 tournaments
$25,000 tournaments
$10,000 tournaments

Finals by surface
Hard (6–6)
Clay (0–0)
Grass (0–2)
Carpet (0–0)

Outcome	No.	Date	Tournament	Surface	Partner	Opponents	Score
Winner	1.	5 December 2008	ITF Sorrento, Australia	Hard	(Australia) Shannon Golds	(United Kingdom) Jade Curtis (Hong Kong) Zhang Ling	6–4, 3–6, [10–8]
Runner-up	2.	4 May 2009	ITF Ipswich, Australia	Grass	(Australia) Shannon Golds	(Japan) Maki Arai (Australia) Olivia Rogowska	3–6, 2–6
Runner-up	3.	14 September 2009	ITF Darwin, Australia	Hard	(Australia) Olivia Rogowska	(Australia) Nicole Kriz (Australia) Alicia Molik	3–6, 4–6
Runner-up	4.	11 September 2010	ITF Cairns, Australia	Hard	(Thailand) Noppawan Lertcheewakarn	(Australia) Tammi Patterson (Australia) Olivia Rogowska	3–6, 6–7^{(3)}
Runner-up	5.	19 September 2011	ITF Darwin, Australia	Hard	(Australia) Stephanie Bengson	(Brazil) Maria Fernanda Alves (United Kingdom) Samantha Murray	4–6, 2–6
Winner	6.	31 October 2011	ITF Mount Gambier, Australia	Hard	(Australia) Stephanie Bengson	(Australia) Isabella Holland (Australia) Sally Peers	w/o
Winner	7.	14 November 2011	ITF Traralgon, Australia	Hard	(Australia) Stephanie Bengson	(Australia) Monique Adamczak (Australia) Bojana Bobusic	6–7^{(2)}, 6–1, [10–8]
Winner	8.	21 November 2011	Bendigo International, Australia	Hard	(Australia) Stephanie Bengson	(Australia) Storm Sanders (United Kingdom) Samantha Murray	2–6, 6–1, [10–5]
Runner-up	9.	4 February 2012	Burnie International, Australia	Hard	(Australia) Stephanie Bengson	(Australia) Arina Rodionova (United Kingdom) Melanie South	2–6, 2–6
Runner-up	10.	20 February 2012	ITF Mildura, Australia	Grass	(Australia) Stephanie Bengson	(Bosnia and Herzegovina) Mervana Jugić-Salkić (Russia) Ksenia Lykina	7–5, 5–7, [7–10]
Winner	11.	25 June 2012	ITF Pattaya, Thailand	Hard	(New Zealand) Dianne Hollands	(China) Deng Mengning (China) Zhao Qianqian	6–1, 6–3
Runner-up	12.	2 July 2012	ITF Pattaya, Thailand	Hard	(New Zealand) Dianne Hollands	(Japan) Eri Hozumi (Japan) Mari Tanaka	6–4, 4–6, [10–12]
Runner-up	13.	27 August 2012	ITF Cairns, Australia	Hard	(Australia) Tammi Patterson	(Australia) Monique Adamczak (France) Victoria Larrière	2–6, 6–1, [5–10]
Winner	14.	4 March 2013	ITF Sydney, Australia	Hard	(Australia) Alison Bai	(Australia) Anja Dokic (Australia) Jessica Moore	7–6^{(7–3)}, 6–4
