= Dianne Hollands =

New Zealand tennis player

- Country (sports): New Zealand
- Born: 11 May 1983 (age 41)
- Turned pro: 2007
- Retired: 2014
- Plays: Right-handed (two-handed backhand)
- Prize money: $24,445

Singles
- Career record: 73–83
- Career titles: 0
- Highest ranking: No. 623 (7 December 2009)

Doubles
- Career record: 75–68
- Career titles: 5 ITF
- Highest ranking: No. 474 (25 November 2013)

Dianne Hollands (born 11 May 1983) is a retired New Zealand tennis player.

Over her career, Hollands won five doubles titles on the ITF Women's Circuit. On 7 December 2009, she reached her best singles ranking of world No. 623. On 25 November 2013, she peaked at No. 474 in the WTA doubles rankings.

Playing for New Zealand in the Fed Cup, Hollands has a win–loss record of 9–4.

She retired from professional tennis 2014.

== ITF Circuit finals ==
$10,000 tournaments

=== Singles (0–1) ===
Result	Date	Location	Surface	Opponent	Score
Loss	30 July 2012	Fort Worth, United States	Hard	(United States) Elizabeth Ferris	1–6, 1–6

=== Doubles (5–4) ===
Result	No.	Date	Location	Surface	Partnering	Opponents	Score
Win	1.	14 August 2007	Bielefeld, Germany	Clay	(United States) Kady Pooler	(Netherlands) Leonie Mekel (Georgia (country)) Manana Shapakidze	6–2, 6–4
Loss	1.	21 January 2008	Wrexham, United Kingdom	Clay	(Russia) Elena Kulikova	(Slovakia) Martina Babáková (Czech Republic) Iveta Gerlová	6–3, 3–6, [9–11]
Loss	2.	23 May 2010	Landisville, United States	Hard	(Australia) Tiffany Welford	(United States) Alexandra Mueller (United States) Gail Brodsky	6–4, 5–7, [2–10]
Loss	3.	26 June 2011	Cleveland, United States	Clay	(India) Shikha Uberoi	(United States) Brooke Austin (United States) Brooke Bolender	6–7^{(2)}, 3–6
Win	2.	3 July 2011	Buffalo, United States	Clay	(India) Shikha Uberoi	(Poland) Paulina Bigos (Canada) Brittany Wowchuk	7–5, 6–4
Win	3.	25 June 2012	Pattaya, Thailand	Hard	(Australia) Tyra Calderwood	(China) Deng Mengning (China) Zhao Qianqian	6–1, 6–3
Loss	4.	2 July 2012	Pattaya, Thailand	Hard	(Australia) Tyra Calderwood	(Japan) Eri Hozumi (Japan) Mari Tanaka	6–4, 4–6, [10–12]
Win	4.	5 August 2012	Fort Worth, United States	Hard	(United States) Macall Harkins	(United States) Anamika Bhargava (United States) Elizabeth Ferris	7–6^{(6)}, 6–4
Win	5.	29 July 2013	Sharm El Sheikh, Egypt	Hard	(Ukraine) Anastasia Kharchenko	(Netherlands) Kim Kilsdonk (Netherlands) Nicolette van Uitert	3–6, 6–4, [10–8]
