= Tammi Patterson =

Australian tennis player

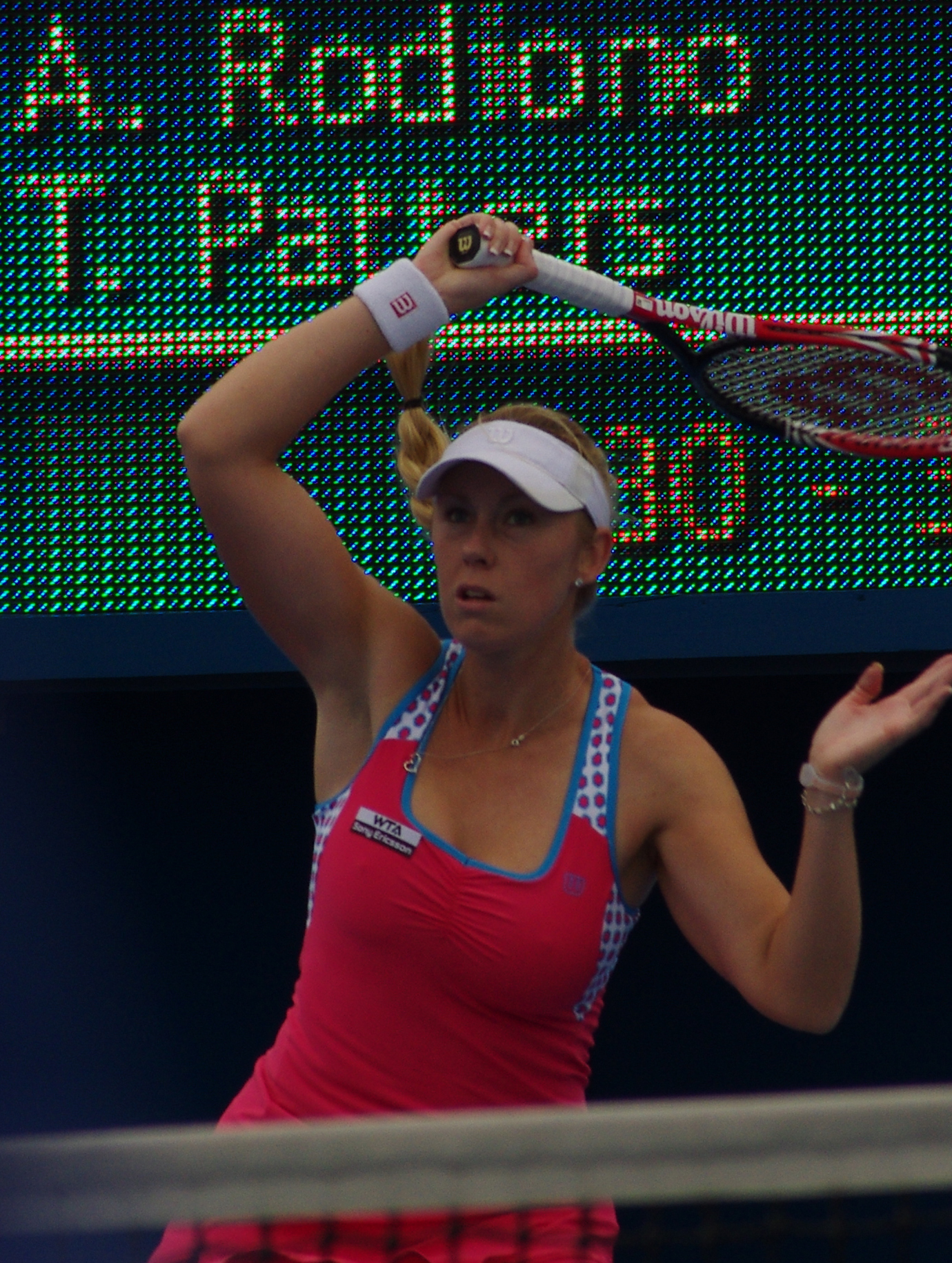
- Patterson, 2012
- Country (sports): Australia
- Residence: Melbourne, Australia
- Born: 3 January 1990 (age 36) Sydney, Australia
- Height: 1.67 m (5 ft 6 in)
- Retired: 2019 (last match played)
- Plays: Right (two-handed backhand)
- Prize money: $194,296

Singles
- Career record: 173–199
- Career titles: 1 ITF
- Highest ranking: No. 289 (21 February 2011)

Grand Slam singles results
- Australian Open: 1R (2016)

Doubles
- Career record: 145–137
- Career titles: 10 ITF
- Highest ranking: No. 215 (23 October 2017)

Grand Slam doubles results
- Australian Open: 1R (2011, 2012, 2014, 2016)

Tammi Patterson (born 3 January 1990) is an Australian former professional tennis player.

Patterson won one singles title and 10 doubles titles on the ITF Circuit. On 21 February 2011, she reached a career-high singles ranking of 289. On 23 October 2017, she peaked at 215 in the doubles rankings.

Patterson made her Grand Slam debut at the 2016 Australian Open as a wildcard entry. She lost to former world No. 1 Ana Ivanovic in the first round in straight sets, winning just five games and not being able to force a break point.

== ITF Circuit finals ==
=== Singles: 2 (1 title, 1 runner–up) ===
Legend $100,000 tournaments $80,000 tournaments $50,000 tournaments $25,000 tournaments	Finals by surface Hard (1–1) Clay (0–0) Grass (0–0) Carpet (0–0)

Result	W–L	Date	Tournament	Tier	Surface	Opponent	Score
Loss	0–1	Nov 2013	Bendigo International, Australia	50,000	Hard	(Australia) Casey Dellacqua	3–6, 1–6
Win	1–1	Jun 2017	ITF Tokyo, Japan	25,000	Hard	(Thailand) Peangtarn Plipuech	6–3, 6–2

=== Doubles: 21 (10 titles, 11 runner-ups) ===
Legend $60,000 tournaments $25,000 tournaments $15,000 tournaments $10,000 tournaments	Finals by surface Hard (5–7) Clay (3–3) Grass (1–0) Carpet (1–1)

Result	W–L	Date	Tournament	Surface	Partner	Opponents	Score
Win	1–0	14 July 2008	ITF Frinton, United Kingdom	Grass	(Australia) Emelyn Starr	(United Kingdom) Jade Curtis (United Kingdom) Elizabeth Thomas	6–3, 7–5
Win	2–0	20 June 2009	ITF Alcobaça, Portugal	Hard	(Australia) Shannon Golds	(South Africa) Monica Gorny (United Kingdom) Jade Windley	3–6, 6–2, [10–4]
Loss	2–1	29 June 2009	ITF Cremona, Italy	Clay	(Australia) Alenka Hubacek	(Italy) Benedetta Davato (Switzerland) Lisa Sabino	5–7, 3–6
Win	3–1	24 May 2010	ITF Velenje, Slovenia	Clay	(Australia) Alenka Hubacek	(Czech Republic) Kateřina Kramperová (Czech Republic) Pavla Šmídová	6–1, 3–6, 6–4
Win	4–1	6 September 2010	ITF Cairns, Australia	Hard	(Australia) Olivia Rogowska	(Australia) Tyra Calderwood (Thailand) Noppawan Lertcheewakarn	6–3, 7–6^{(3)}
Loss	4–2	14 September 2010	ITF Darwin, Australia	Hard	(Australia) Alenka Hubacek	(Japan) Kumiko Iijima (Japan) Yurika Sema	4–6, 1–6
Win	5–2	15 November 2010	ITF Wellington, New Zealand	Hard	(Hungary) Tímea Babos	(Australia) Jarmila Groth (Australia) Jade Hopper	6–3, 6–2
Loss	5–3	27 August 2012	ITF Cairns, Australia	Hard	(Australia) Tyra Calderwood	(Australia) Monique Adamczak (France) Victoria Larrière	2–6, 6–1, [5–10]
Loss	5–4	5 October 2013	ITF Perth, Australıa	Hard	(Australia) Monique Adamczak	(Japan) Yurika Sema (Japan) Erika Sema	5–7, 1–6
Loss	5–5	13 October 2013	ITF Margaret River, Australıa	Hard	(Australia) Monique Adamczak	(Thailand) Noppawan Lertcheewakarn (Russia) Arina Rodionova	2–6, 6–3, [8–10]
Loss	5–6	5 April 2014	ITF Glen Iris, Australia	Clay	(Australia) Ellen Perez	(Australia) Jessica Moore (Bulgaria) Aleksandrina Naydenova	4–6, 2–6
Win	6–6	28 March 2015	ITF Mornington, Australia	Clay	(Australia) Priscilla Hon	(Japan) Mana Ayukawa (Japan) Ayaka Okuno	6–4, 7–6^{(4)}
Win	7–6	3 April 2015	ITF Melbourne, Australia	Clay	(Australia) Priscilla Hon	(Poland) Agata Barańska (Poland) Sandra Zaniewska	2–6, 6–4, [12–10]
Win	8–6	2 October 2015	ITF Tweed Heads, Australia	Hard	(Australia) Kimberly Birrell	(Hungary) Dalma Gálfi (Australia) Priscilla Hon	6–7^{(3)}, 6–3, [10–8]
Win	9–6	19 February 2016	ITF Perth, Australia	Hard	(Poland) Katarzyna Piter	(South Korea) Han Na-lae (South Korea) Jang Su-jeong	4–6, 6–2, [10–3]
Loss	9–7	24 February 2017	ITF Perth, Australia	Hard	(Australia) Olivia Rogowska	(Japan) Junri Namigata (Japan) Riko Sawayanagi	6–4, 5–7, [6–10]
Win	10–7	20 May 2017	Kurume Cup, Japan	Carpet	(United Kingdom) Katy Dunne	(Japan) Erina Hayashi (Japan) Robu Kajitani	6–7^{(3)}, 6–2, [10–4]
Loss	10–8	27 May 2017	ITF Karuizawa, Japan	Carpet	(Japan) Ayaka Okuno	(Japan) Chisa Hosonuma (Japan) Kanako Morisaki	5–7, 3–6
Loss	10–9	22 July 2017	Stockton Challenger, U.S.	Hard	(South Africa) Chanel Simmonds	(United States) Usue Maitane Arconada (United States) Sofia Kenin	6–4, 1–6, [5–10]
Loss	10–10	22 September 2017	ITF Penrith, Australia	Hard	(Australia) Olivia Rogowska	(Australia) Naiktha Bains (Papua New Guinea) Abigail Tere-Apisah	0–6, 5–7
Loss	10–11	1 July 2018	ITF Stuttgart, Germany	Clay	(Bosnia and Herzegovina) Anita Husarić	(Romania) Irina Fetecau (Venezuela) Aymet Uzcátegui	2–6, 6–3, [4–10]
