= Sachie Ishizu =

Japanese tennis player (born 1992)

Sachie Ishizu 石津幸恵
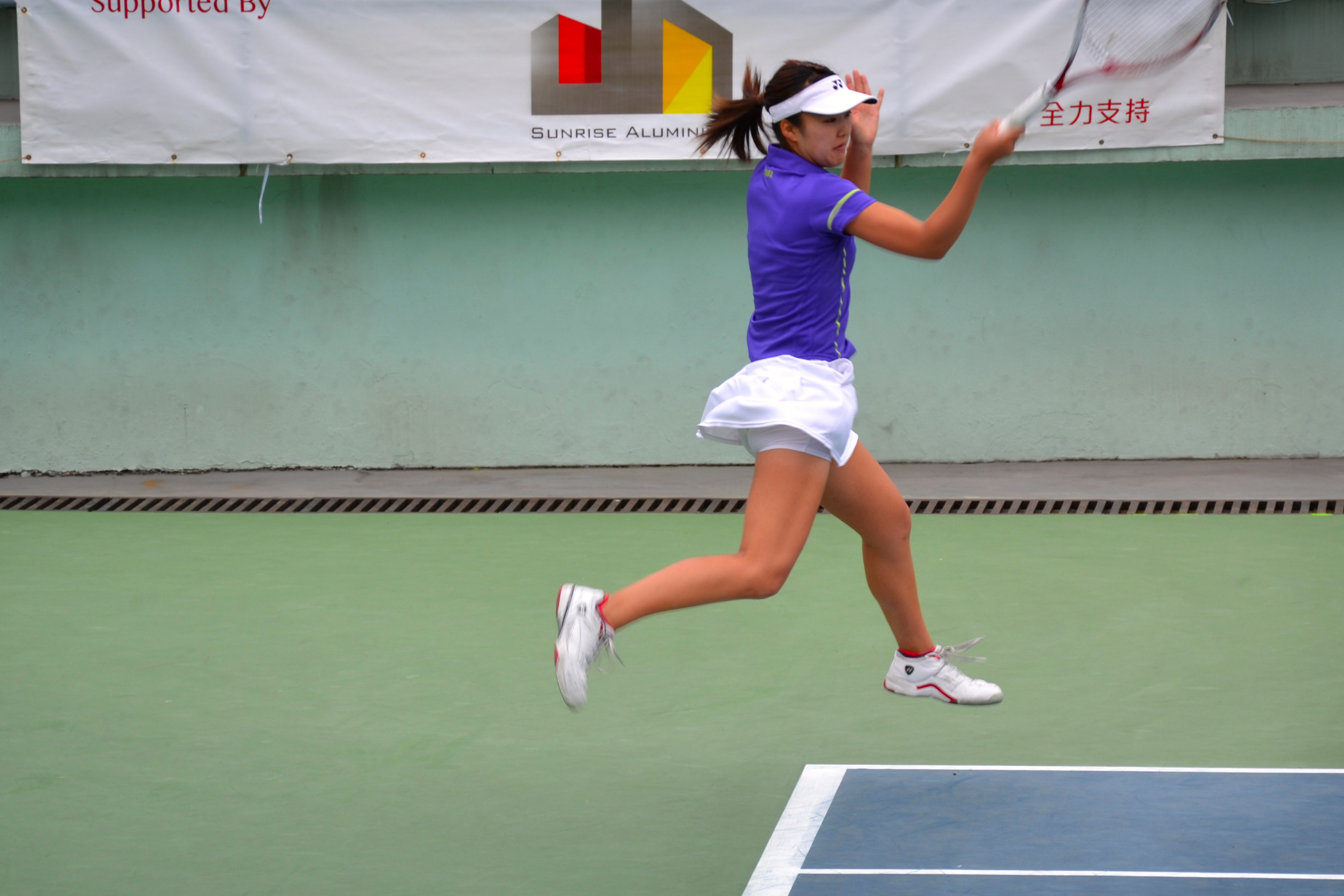
- Country (sports): Japan
- Residence: Tsuchiura
- Born: 3 September 1992 (age 32); Tokyo, Japan
- Height: 1.64 m (5 ft 5 in)
- Plays: Right (two-handed backhand)
- Prize money: $116,261

Singles
- Career record: 177–104
- Career titles: 9 ITF
- Highest ranking: No. 162 (10 February 2014)

Doubles
- Career record: 55–61
- Career titles: 1 ITF
- Highest ranking: No. 287 (31 March 2014)

Sachie Ishizu (Japanese: 石津幸恵, Ishizu Sachie, born 3 September 1992) is a former professional tennis player from Japan.

== Tennis career ==
She was runner-up in the girls' singles event of the 2010 Wimbledon Championships and reached a highest ranking of No. 5 on the ITF Junior Circuit. Following her junior career, she chose to attend the University of Tsukuba but decided in 2013 to take a leave of absence to focus on tennis and spend time training in the United States. She was coached by her father, Yasuhiko Ishizu.

Ishizu participated at the 2013 Summer Universiade in Kazan winning the gold medal in the singles and the team competition.

Her final appearance on the ITF Circuit took place in Hamamatsu, Japan in October 2015.

== ITF Circuit finals ==
Legend
$50,000 tournaments
$25,000 tournaments
$10,000 tournaments

=== Singles (9–4) ===
Result	No.	Date	Tournament	Surface	Opponent	Score
Win	1.	31 Aug 2008	ITF Saitama, Japan	Hard	(Chinese Taipei) Hwang I-hsuan	6–2, 6–2
Loss	1.	12 July 2009	ITF Tokyo, Japan	Carpet	(Japan) Misaki Doi	1–6, 4–6
Loss	2.	22 Aug 2009	ITF Nonthaburi, Thailand	Hard	(Hong Kong) Zhang Ling	3–6, 5–7
Win	2.	30 Aug 2009	ITF Saitama, Japan	Hard	(Japan) Shiho Akita	6–3, 6–4
Win	3.	27 Mar 2010	Kōfu International Open, Japan	Hard	(Japan) Akiko Yonemura	1–6, 6–1, 6–0
Win	4.	25 April 2010	ITF Mie, Japan	Carpet	(Japan) Yumi Nakano	6–0, 6–4
Win	5.	6 June 2010	ITF Komoro, Japan	Clay	(Japan) Miyabi Inoue	6–0, 6–1
Win	6.	1 May 2011	Kangaroo Cup, Japan	Hard	(United Kingdom) Emily Webley-Smith	6–1, 6–3
Loss	3.	29 May 2011	ITF Niigata, Japan	Hard	(Japan) Erika Sema	6–7^{(5)}, 4–6
Loss	4.	9 July 2011	ITF Pattaya, Thailand	Hard	(Japan) Akiko Omae	5–7, 2–6
Win	7.	12 Jan 2013	ITF Hong Kong	Hard	(China) Wen Xin	2–6, 6–1, 6–3
Win	8.	10 Feb 2013	ITF Rancho Mirage, United States	Hard	(France) Julie Coin	6–3, 7–6^{(3)}
Win	9.	12 Sep 2015	ITF Kyoto, Japan	Hard (i)	(Japan) Yurina Koshino	3–6, 6–1, 6–1

=== Doubles (1–3) ===
Result	No.	Date	Tournament	Surface	Partner	Opponents	Score
Loss	1.	24 December 2010	ITF Pune, India	Hard	(Ukraine) Anna Shkudun	(Russia) Alexandra Panova (Russia) Nina Bratchikova	3–6, 6–7^{(2)}
Loss	2.	23 November 2012	ITF Temuco, Chile	Clay	(Guatemala) Daniela Schippers	(Argentina) Victoria Bosio (Chile) Daniela Seguel	4–6, 2–6
Win	1.	25 May 2013	ITF Karuizawa, Japan	Grass	(Japan) Shiho Akita	(Japan) Erika Takao (Japan) Miki Miyamura	7–5, 7–6^{(8)}
Loss	3.	22 June 2013	ITF Buffalo, United States	Clay	(United States) Denise Starr	(United States) Emily Harman (United States) Alexandra Mueller	6–4, 3–6, [7–10]
