= 2015 Australian Open – Women's singles qualifying =

Women's singles qualifying
- 2015 Australian Open

Events
Singles	men	women		boys	girls
Doubles	men	women	mixed	boys	girls
WC Singles	men	women	quad
WC Doubles	men	women	quad
Legends	men	women	mixed

Qualification
Singles	men	women
- Australian Open

This article displays the qualifying draw for women's singles at the 2015 Australian Open.

The draw was announced on 14 January 2015, with play commencing the next day.

== Seeds ==
1. (Czech Republic) Denisa Allertová (qualified)
2. (Japan) Misaki Doi (second round)
3. (Spain) Lourdes Domínguez Lino (first round)
4. (Montenegro) Danka Kovinić (first round)
5. (Brazil) Teliana Pereira (second round)
6. (Kazakhstan) Yulia Putintseva (qualifying competition, lucky loser)
7. (Thailand) Luksika Kumkhum (first round)
8. (Romania) Andreea Mitu (second round)
9. (Israel) Shahar Pe'er (qualifying competition)
10. (Russia) Evgeniya Rodina (qualified)
11. (Japan) Misa Eguchi (second round)
12. (Austria) Patricia Mayr-Achleitner (first round)
13. (Turkey) Çağla Büyükakçay (qualifying competition)
14. (Ukraine) Maryna Zanevska (qualifying competition)
15. (Serbia) Jovana Jakšić (first round)
16. (Argentina) Paula Ormaechea (second round)
17. (China) Zhu Lin (first round)
18. (Colombia) Mariana Duque Mariño (first round)
19. (Czech Republic) Kristýna Plíšková (first round)
20. (Poland) Magda Linette (first round)
21. (Canada) Sharon Fichman (first round)
22. (Germany) Laura Siegemund (qualifying competition)
23. (Netherlands) Richèl Hogenkamp (qualified)
24. (United States) Anna Tatishvili (qualified)

== Qualifiers ==
1. (Czech Republic) Denisa Allertová
2. (France) Stéphanie Foretz
3. (Czech Republic) Renata Voráčová
4. (Germany) Tatjana Maria
5. (Russia) Alexandra Panova
6. (Czech Republic) Lucie Hradecká
7. (Tunisia) Ons Jabeur
8. (Poland) Urszula Radwańska
9. (Netherlands) Richèl Hogenkamp
10. (Russia) Evgeniya Rodina
11. (United States) Anna Tatishvili
12. (Croatia) Petra Martić

== Lucky loser ==
1. (Kazakhstan) Yulia Putintseva

== Draw ==
Key

- Q = Qualifier
- WC = Wild card
- LL = Lucky loser
- Alt = Alternate
- ITF = ITF entry
- PR = Protected ranking
- SR = Special ranking
- SE = Special exempt
- JE = Junior exempt
- JR = Junior Accelerator Programme entrant
- CO = College Accelerator Programme entrant
- NG = Next Gen Accelerator Program entrant
- w/o = Walkover
- r = Retired
- d = Defaulted

=== First qualifier ===
First round
1	(Czech Republic) Denisa Allertová	6	7
(Belgium) Ysaline Bonaventure	3	5
(Japan) Miharu Imanishi	3	4
(Czech Republic) Andrea Hlaváčková	6	6
WC	(Australia) Kimberly Birrell	2	6	2
(Ukraine) Kateryna Bondarenko	6	4	6
(Liechtenstein) Stephanie Vogt	4	6^{6}
22	(Germany) Laura Siegemund	6	7^{8}

Second round
1	(Czech Republic) Denisa Allertová	4	6	6
(Czech Republic) Andrea Hlaváčková	6	3	3
(Ukraine) Kateryna Bondarenko	4	2
22	(Germany) Laura Siegemund	6	6

Qualifying competition
1	(Czech Republic) Denisa Allertová	6	6
22	(Germany) Laura Siegemund	1	2

=== Second qualifier ===
First round
2	(Japan) Misaki Doi	2	6	6
(France) Mathilde Johansson	6	3	2
(Japan) Risa Ozaki	1	0
(Belarus) Olga Govortsova	6	6
(Belarus) Aliaksandra Sasnovich	3	6	0
(Italy) Alberta Brianti	6	2	6
(France) Stéphanie Foretz	4	7	6
18	(Colombia) Mariana Duque Mariño	6	5	2

Second round
2	(Japan) Misaki Doi	3	7^{7}	1
(Belarus) Olga Govortsova	6	6^{5}	6
(Italy) Alberta Brianti	3	2
(France) Stéphanie Foretz	6	6

Qualifying competition
(Belarus) Olga Govortsova	6^{5}	3
(France) Stéphanie Foretz	7^{7}	6

=== Third qualifier ===
First round
3	(Spain) Lourdes Domínguez Lino	1	6	4
PR	(United States) Alexa Glatch	6	3	6
WC	(Australia) Jessica Moore	1	7	6
WC	(France) Fiona Ferro	6	5	2
(Japan) Eri Hozumi	0	7^{7}	6
(Chinese Taipei) Hsieh Su-wei	6	6^{4}	4
(Czech Republic) Renata Voráčová	5	7^{7}	6
17	(China) Zhu Lin	7	6^{5}	2

Second round
PR	(United States) Alexa Glatch	6	6
WC	(Australia) Jessica Moore	1	4
(Japan) Eri Hozumi	3	2
(Czech Republic) Renata Voráčová	6	6

Qualifying competition
PR	(United States) Alexa Glatch	4	5
(Czech Republic) Renata Voráčová	6	7

=== Fourth qualifier ===
First round
4	(Montenegro) Danka Kovinić	0	4
(France) Virginie Razzano	6	6
(Germany) Tatjana Maria	6	1	6
(Italy) Gioia Barbieri	1	6	1
(Switzerland) Viktorija Golubic	6	4	6
WC	(Australia) Olivia Tjandramulia	4	6	3
(Uzbekistan) Nigina Abduraimova	2	2
13	(Turkey) Çağla Büyükakçay	6	6

Second round
(France) Virginie Razzano	6	0	4
(Germany) Tatjana Maria	4	6	6
(Switzerland) Viktorija Golubic	6	0	0
13	(Turkey) Çağla Büyükakçay	2	6	6

Qualifying competition
(Germany) Tatjana Maria	6	6
13	(Turkey) Çağla Büyükakçay	3	2

=== Fifth qualifier ===
First round
5	(Brazil) Teliana Pereira	3	6	6
(Bulgaria) Elitsa Kostova	6	4	2
WC	(Australia) Sara Tomic	4	7^{7}	1
(Russia) Ekaterina Bychkova	6	6^{4}	6
(Hong Kong) Zhang Ling	2	3
(Russia) Alexandra Panova	6	6
(Bulgaria) Sesil Karatantcheva	6	6
20	(Poland) Magda Linette	2	2

Second round
5	(Brazil) Teliana Pereira	6^{1}	6	4
(Russia) Ekaterina Bychkova	7^{7}	3	6
(Russia) Alexandra Panova	6^{4}	6	6
(Bulgaria) Sesil Karatantcheva	7^{7}	2	3

Qualifying competition
(Russia) Ekaterina Bychkova	2	6	3
(Russia) Alexandra Panova	6	1	6

=== Sixth qualifier ===
First round
6	(Kazakhstan) Yulia Putintseva	6	7^{7}
(United States) Julia Boserup	1	6^{4}
(China) Xu Yifan	6^{2}	6	6
(Argentina) María Irigoyen	7^{7}	2	3
(Canada) Gabriela Dabrowski	3	4
(Ukraine) Yuliya Beygelzimer	6	6
(Czech Republic) Lucie Hradecká	6	6
15	(Serbia) Jovana Jakšić	3	3

Second round
6	(Kazakhstan) Yulia Putintseva	7	7
(China) Xu Yifan	5	5
(Ukraine) Yuliya Beygelzimer	6	4	5
(Czech Republic) Lucie Hradecká	4	6	7

Qualifying competition
6	(Kazakhstan) Yulia Putintseva	1	2
(Czech Republic) Lucie Hradecká	6	6

=== Seventh qualifier ===
First round
7	(Thailand) Luksika Kumkhum	6	6^{5}	2
(China) Wang Yafan	2	7^{7}	6
(Romania) Patricia Maria Țig	6^{6}	5
(Israel) Julia Glushko	7^{8}	7
WC	(Australia) Naiktha Bains	2	1
(Tunisia) Ons Jabeur	6	6
(Japan) Junri Namigata	6^{3}	7	6
19	(Czech Republic) Kristýna Plíšková	7^{7}	5	3

Second round
(China) Wang Yafan	7	6
(Israel) Julia Glushko	5	2
(Tunisia) Ons Jabeur	6	6
(Japan) Junri Namigata	4	4

Qualifying competition
(China) Wang Yafan	2	4
(Tunisia) Ons Jabeur	6	6

=== Eighth qualifier ===
First round
8	(Romania) Andreea Mitu	6	3	10
(France) Claire Feuerstein	4	6	8
(Ukraine) Anastasiya Vasylyeva	6	5	3
(Japan) Hiroko Kuwata	1	7	6
(Poland) Urszula Radwańska	6	6
(United Kingdom) Naomi Broady	4	3
(Luxembourg) Mandy Minella	3	3
16	(Argentina) Paula Ormaechea	6	6

Second round
8	(Romania) Andreea Mitu	3	6	5
(Japan) Hiroko Kuwata	6	3	7
(Poland) Urszula Radwańska	6	6
16	(Argentina) Paula Ormaechea	0	3

Qualifying competition
(Japan) Hiroko Kuwata	6	1	5
(Poland) Urszula Radwańska	2	6	7

=== Ninth qualifier ===
First round
9	(Israel) Shahar Pe'er	3	7	6
(Canada) Françoise Abanda	6	5	3
(Russia) Marina Melnikova	2	7^{7}	3
(Australia) Anastasia Rodionova	6	6^{5}	6
(United States) Louisa Chirico	7	7
WC	(Australia) Maddison Inglis	5	5
(Japan) Shuko Aoyama	5	7	3
23	(Netherlands) Richèl Hogenkamp	7	5	6

Second round
9	(Israel) Shahar Pe'er	6	3	6
(Australia) Anastasia Rodionova	1	6	1
(United States) Louisa Chirico	4	6	6
23	(Netherlands) Richèl Hogenkamp	6	3	8

Qualifying competition
9	(Israel) Shahar Pe'er	7^{7}	3	4
23	(Netherlands) Richèl Hogenkamp	6^{2}	6	6

=== Tenth qualifier ===
First round
10	(Russia) Evgeniya Rodina	7^{8}	6
WC	(Australia) Priscilla Hon	6^{6}	2
(Poland) Paula Kania	2	1
(Estonia) Anett Kontaveit	6	6
(Slovakia) Kristína Kučová	6	2	6
(Chinese Taipei) Chan Yung-jan	4	6	4
(China) Zhang Kailin	6	3	2
14	(Ukraine) Maryna Zanevska	3	6	6

Second round
10	(Russia) Evgeniya Rodina	2	6	6
(Estonia) Anett Kontaveit	6	2	4
(Slovakia) Kristína Kučová	6	0	4
14	(Ukraine) Maryna Zanevska	2	6	6

Qualifying competition
10	(Russia) Evgeniya Rodina	7	6
14	(Ukraine) Maryna Zanevska	5	4

=== Eleventh qualifier ===
First round
11	(Japan) Misa Eguchi	6	6
(Paraguay) Verónica Cepede Royg	4	3
(Poland) Katarzyna Piter	7	6
(Ukraine) Lyudmyla Kichenok	5	3
(Uzbekistan) Akgul Amanmuradova	6	6^{2}	7
(Ukraine) Nadiia Kichenok	3	7^{7}	5
(United Kingdom) Johanna Konta	4	5
24	(United States) Anna Tatishvili	6	7

Second round
11	(Japan) Misa Eguchi	6	4	0
(Poland) Katarzyna Piter	3	6	6
(Uzbekistan) Akgul Amanmuradova	6^{0}	3
24	(United States) Anna Tatishvili	7^{7}	6

Qualifying competition
(Poland) Katarzyna Piter	2	0
24	(United States) Anna Tatishvili	6	6

=== Twelfth qualifier ===
First round
12	(Austria) Patricia Mayr-Achleitner	4	3
(China) Liu Fangzhou	6	6
(Czech Republic) Barbora Krejčíková	6	6
(Peru) Bianca Botto	0	0
(Romania) Ana Bogdan	2	3
(Croatia) Petra Martić	6	6
(Russia) Elizaveta Kulichkova	6	6
21	(Canada) Sharon Fichman	4	1

Second round
(China) Liu Fangzhou	2	7	6
(Czech Republic) Barbora Krejčíková	6	5	3
(Croatia) Petra Martić	7	6
(Russia) Elizaveta Kulichkova	5	3

Qualifying competition
(China) Liu Fangzhou	7	4	4
(Croatia) Petra Martić	5	6	6
