= 2015 Australian Open – Men's singles qualifying =

Men's singles qualifying
- 2015 Australian Open

Events
| Singles | men | women | | boys | girls |
| Doubles | men | women | mixed | boys | girls |
| WC Singles | men | women | quad |
| WC Doubles | men | women | quad |
| Legends | men | women | mixed |

Qualification
| Singles | men | women |
- Australian Open

This article displays the qualifying draw for the Men's singles at the 2015 Australian Open.

The draw was announced on 13 January 2015, with play commencing the next day.

== Seeds ==
1. (Bosnia and Herzegovina) Damir Džumhur (second round)
2. (Austria) Jürgen Melzer (qualified)
3. (France) Pierre-Hugues Herbert (first round)
4. (United States) Tim Smyczek (qualified)
5. (Germany) Andreas Beck (qualifying competition)
6. (France) Nicolas Mahut (first round)
7. (Slovenia) Aljaž Bedene (qualified)
8. (Chinese Taipei) Jimmy Wang (qualified)
9. (Uzbekistan) Farrukh Dustov (first round)
10. (Germany) Michael Berrer (second round)
11. (Argentina) Horacio Zeballos (first round)
12. (Slovakia) Norbert Gombos (first round)
13. (Russia) Alexander Kudryavtsev (qualified)
14. (Kazakhstan) Aleksandr Nedovyesov (second round)
15. (Russia) Evgeny Donskoy (first round)
16. (Spain) Adrián Menéndez-Maceiras (second round)
17. (Belgium) Steve Darcis (qualifying competition)
18. (France) Benoît Paire (first round)
19. (Japan) Yūichi Sugita (qualifying competition)
20. (Germany) Alexander Zverev (first round)
21. (Netherlands) Thiemo de Bakker (second round)
22. (India) Somdev Devvarman (first round)
23. (United States) Rajeev Ram (first round)
24. (Germany) Matthias Bachinger (qualified)
25. (Portugal) Gastão Elias (first round)
26. (Ukraine) Illya Marchenko (qualified)
27. (Canada) Frank Dancevic (first round)
28. (Japan) Hiroki Moriya (qualifying competition, lucky loser)
29. (Italy) Luca Vanni (second round)
30. (United States) Bradley Klahn (second round)
31. (France) Vincent Millot (qualifying competition)
32. (Croatia) Mate Delić (second round)

== Qualifiers ==
1. (Germany) Tim Pütz
2. (Austria) Jürgen Melzer
3. (Sweden) Elias Ymer
4. (United States) Tim Smyczek
5. (Germany) Matthias Bachinger
6. (Czech Republic) Jan Hernych
7. (United Kingdom) Aljaž Bedene
8. (Chinese Taipei) Jimmy Wang
9. (United States) Michael Russell
10. (Belgium) Ruben Bemelmans
11. (Romania) Marius Copil
12. (United Kingdom) Kyle Edmund
13. (Russia) Alexander Kudryavtsev
14. (Ukraine) Illya Marchenko
15. (India) Yuki Bhambri
16. (France) Laurent Lokoli

== Lucky loser ==
1. (Japan) Hiroki Moriya

== Draw ==
Key

- Q = Qualifier
- WC = Wild card
- LL = Lucky loser
- Alt = Alternate
- ITF = ITF entry
- PR = Protected ranking
- SR = Special ranking
- SE = Special exempt
- JE = Junior exempt
- JR = Junior Accelerator Programme entrant
- CO = College Accelerator Programme entrant
- NG = Next Gen Accelerator Program entrant
- w/o = Walkover
- r = Retired
- d = Defaulted

=== First qualifier ===
First round
1 | (Bosnia and Herzegovina) Damir Džumhur | 5 | 7 | 6
(Slovakia) Miloslav Mečíř Jr. | 7 | 5 | 4
(Brazil) Fabiano de Paula | 4 | 5
(Germany) Tim Pütz | 6 | 7
(Italy) Marco Cecchinato | 6 | 6
(Slovakia) Andrej Martin | 3 | 2
(United States) Jarmere Jenkins | 4 | 6 | 6
23 | (United States) Rajeev Ram | 6 | 3 | 4

Second round
1 | (Bosnia and Herzegovina) Damir Džumhur | 2 | 6 | 6
(Germany) Tim Pütz | 6 | 4 | 8
(Italy) Marco Cecchinato | 4 | 6^{3}
(United States) Jarmere Jenkins | 6 | 7^{7}

Qualifying competition
(Germany) Tim Pütz | 6 | 7
(United States) Jarmere Jenkins | 4 | 5

=== Second qualifier ===
First round
2 | (Austria) Jürgen Melzer | 6 | 6
(Chile) Nicolás Jarry | 3 | 4
(Spain) Daniel Muñoz de la Nava | 7^{7} | 7
(Croatia) Antonio Veić | 6^{5} | 5
(France) Axel Michon | 7 | 6
WC | (Australia) Matt Reid | 5 | 4
(Spain) Iñigo Cervantes | 0 | 5
17 | (Belgium) Steve Darcis | 6 | 7

Second round
2 | (Austria) Jürgen Melzer | 2 | 7^{7} | 7
(Spain) Daniel Muñoz de la Nava | 6 | 6^{2} | 5
(France) Axel Michon | 1 | 3
17 | (Belgium) Steve Darcis | 6 | 6

Qualifying competition
2 | (Austria) Jürgen Melzer | 7^{8} | 1 | 6
17 | (Belgium) Steve Darcis | 6^{6} | 6 | 4

=== Third qualifier ===
First round
3 | (France) Pierre-Hugues Herbert | 4 | 2
(South Korea) Chung Hyeon | 6 | 6
(Germany) Nils Langer | 7 | 4 | 6
(India) Ramkumar Ramanathan | 5 | 6 | 4
(Brazil) Guilherme Clezar | 6^{1} | 7^{7} | 0
(Czech Republic) Jan Mertl | 7^{7} | 6^{2} | 6
(Sweden) Elias Ymer | 6 | 6
18 | (France) Benoît Paire | 0 | 4

Second round
(South Korea) Chung Hyeon | 6 | 6
(Germany) Nils Langer | 1 | 0
(Czech Republic) Jan Mertl | 3 | 4
(Sweden) Elias Ymer | 6 | 6

Qualifying competition
(South Korea) Chung Hyeon | 5 | 3
(Sweden) Elias Ymer | 7 | 6

=== Fourth qualifier ===
First round
4 | (United States) Tim Smyczek | 7^{7} | 7
(Belgium) Kimmer Coppejans | 6^{3} | 5
WC | (Australia) Marc Polmans | 7^{9} | 6
(Spain) Jordi Samper-Montaña | 6^{7} | 1
WC | (Australia) Gavin van Peperzeel | 2 | 3
(Belgium) Maxime Authom | 6 | 6
(Serbia) Peđa Krstin | 6^{5} | 2
29 | (Italy) Luca Vanni | 7^{7} | 6

Second round
4 | (United States) Tim Smyczek | 6 | 6
WC | (Australia) Marc Polmans | 2 | 3
(Belgium) Maxime Authom | 6 | 7^{7}
29 | (Italy) Luca Vanni | 4 | 6^{3}

Qualifying competition
4 | (United States) Tim Smyczek | 5 | 7^{7} | 6
(Belgium) Maxime Authom | 7 | 6^{1} | 2

=== Fifth qualifier ===
First round
5 | (Germany) Andreas Beck | 6 | 6
(Bosnia and Herzegovina) Aldin Šetkić | 3 | 4
(Netherlands) Jesse Huta Galung | 3 | 6^{7}
WC | (Australia) Andrew Harris | 6 | 7^{9}
(Belgium) Niels Desein | 3 | 2
(Moldova) Radu Albot | 6 | 6
(Australia) Matthew Ebden | 6 | 6^{7} | 3
24 | (Germany) Matthias Bachinger | 4 | 7^{9} | 6

Second round
5 | (Germany) Andreas Beck | 7^{10} | 6^{1} | 6
WC | (Australia) Andrew Harris | 6^{8} | 7^{7} | 2
(Moldova) Radu Albot | 1 | 7^{11} | 2
24 | (Germany) Matthias Bachinger | 6 | 6^{9} | 6

Qualifying competition
5 | (Germany) Andreas Beck | 1 | 6^{4}
24 | (Germany) Matthias Bachinger | 6 | 7^{7}

=== Sixth qualifier ===
First round
6 | (France) Nicolas Mahut | 6^{3} | 1
(Czech Republic) Jan Hernych | 7^{7} | 6
(Brazil) André Ghem | 1 | 6^{4}
(Czech Republic) Adam Pavlásek | 6 | 7^{7}
(Belgium) Yannick Mertens | 6 | 5 | 5
(Austria) Gerald Melzer | 4 | 7 | 7
(United States) Alex Kuznetsov | 3 | 6 | 6
27 | (Canada) Frank Dancevic | 6 | 3 | 3

Second round
(Czech Republic) Jan Hernych | 6^{3} | 6 | 14
(Czech Republic) Adam Pavlásek | 7^{7} | 3 | 12
(Austria) Gerald Melzer | 6^{0} | 4
(United States) Alex Kuznetsov | 7^{7} | 6

Qualifying competition
(Czech Republic) Jan Hernych | 6 | 6
(United States) Alex Kuznetsov | 3 | 2

=== Seventh qualifier ===
First round
7 | (Slovenia) Aljaž Bedene | 5 | 6 | 6
(Argentina) Guido Andreozzi | 7 | 4 | 2
(Russia) Aslan Karatsev | 5 | 2
(Bosnia and Herzegovina) Tomislav Brkić | 7 | 6
(Poland) Michał Przysiężny | 4 | 6 | 9
(Estonia) Jürgen Zopp | 6 | 3 | 7
(Spain) Enrique López-Pérez | 3 | 4
30 | (United States) Bradley Klahn | 6 | 6

Second round
7 | (Slovenia) Aljaž Bedene | 6 | 7^{7}
(Bosnia and Herzegovina) Tomislav Brkić | 0 | 6^{2}
(Poland) Michał Przysiężny | 6 | 6
30 | (United States) Bradley Klahn | 4 | 4

Qualifying competition
7 | (Slovenia) Aljaž Bedene | 6 | 6
(Poland) Michał Przysiężny | 4 | 4

=== Eighth qualifier ===
First round
8 | (Chinese Taipei) Jimmy Wang | 6 | 3 | 7
(Italy) Matteo Viola | 3 | 6 | 5
(Russia) Konstantin Kravchuk | 6 | 4 | 8
(Italy) Thomas Fabbiano | 4 | 6 | 6
(United States) Wayne Odesnik | 6 | 7^{7}
(United States) Ryan Harrison | 3 | 6^{4}
(Republic of Ireland) Louk Sorensen | 1 | 0
31 | (France) Vincent Millot | 6 | 6

Second round
8 | (Chinese Taipei) Jimmy Wang | 4 | 7^{7} | 6
(Russia) Konstantin Kravchuk | 6 | 6^{5} | 2
(United States) Wayne Odesnik | 6^{5} | 2
31 | (France) Vincent Millot | 7^{7} | 6

Qualifying competition
8 | (Chinese Taipei) Jimmy Wang | 6 | 6^{5} | 6
31 | (France) Vincent Millot | 1 | 7^{7} | 2

=== Ninth qualifier ===
First round
9 | (Uzbekistan) Farrukh Dustov | 4 | 3
(United Kingdom) Liam Broady | 6 | 6
(United States) Jared Donaldson | 6 | 6
WC | (Australia) Maverick Banes | 3 | 2
(Ukraine) Denys Molchanov | 2 | 2
(United States) Michael Russell | 6 | 6
(Chinese Taipei) Chen Ti | 6 | 4 | 2
21 | (Netherlands) Thiemo de Bakker | 2 | 6 | 6

Second round
(United Kingdom) Liam Broady | 7^{7} | 6^{5} | 6
(United States) Jared Donaldson | 6^{4} | 7^{7} | 4
(United States) Michael Russell | 4 | 6 | 7
21 | (Netherlands) Thiemo de Bakker | 6 | 3 | 5

Qualifying competition
(United Kingdom) Liam Broady | 5 | 3
(United States) Michael Russell | 7 | 6

=== Tenth qualifier ===
First round
10 | (Germany) Michael Berrer | 6 | 6
(Japan) Taro Daniel | 3 | 4
(Netherlands) Boy Westerhof | 4 | 2
(Belgium) Ruben Bemelmans | 6 | 6
(Chinese Taipei) Yang Tsung-hua | 5 | 6 | 5
(France) Enzo Couacaud | 7 | 2 | 7
(United States) Robby Ginepri | 6 | 1 | 3
28 | (Japan) Hiroki Moriya | 4 | 6 | 6

Second round
10 | (Germany) Michael Berrer | 6 | 5 | 3
(Belgium) Ruben Bemelmans | 3 | 7 | 6
(France) Enzo Couacaud | 6 | 1 | 2
28 | (Japan) Hiroki Moriya | 3 | 6 | 6

Qualifying competition
(Belgium) Ruben Bemelmans | 6 | 6
28 | (Japan) Hiroki Moriya | 2 | 2

=== Eleventh qualifier ===
First round
11 | (Argentina) Horacio Zeballos | 4 | 5
(Romania) Marius Copil | 6 | 7
PR | (Germany) Philipp Petzschner | 6 | 6
(Argentina) Marco Trungelliti | 4 | 3
(France) Mathias Bourgue | 5 | 4
WC | (Australia) Omar Jasika | 7 | 6
(Australia) John-Patrick Smith | 7^{10} | 6
20 | (Germany) Alexander Zverev | 6^{8} | 4

Second round
(Romania) Marius Copil | 6 | 3 | 8
PR | (Germany) Philipp Petzschner | 3 | 6 | 6
WC | (Australia) Omar Jasika | 6^{5} | 6 | 12
(Australia) John-Patrick Smith | 7^{7} | 3 | 10

Qualifying competition
(Romania) Marius Copil | 7^{7} | 6
WC | (Australia) Omar Jasika | 6^{5} | 2

=== Twelfth qualifier ===
First round
12 | (Slovakia) Norbert Gombos | 6 | 3 | 2
(Republic of Ireland) James McGee | 1 | 6 | 6
WC | (Australia) Dane Propoggia | 6 | 6
(United Kingdom) Brydan Klein | 4 | 4
(United Kingdom) Kyle Edmund | 6 | 6
(France) Tristan Lamasine | 4 | 2
(United States) Austin Krajicek | 6 | 3 | 6
22 | (India) Somdev Devvarman | 4 | 6 | 4

Second round
(Republic of Ireland) James McGee | 3 | 4
WC | (Australia) Dane Propoggia | 6 | 6
(United Kingdom) Kyle Edmund | 4 | 7^{7} | 6
(United States) Austin Krajicek | 6 | 6^{4} | 2

Qualifying competition
WC | (Australia) Dane Propoggia | 7^{7} | 4 | 7
(United Kingdom) Kyle Edmund | 6^{3} | 6 | 9

=== Thirteenth qualifier ===
First round
13 | (Russia) Alexander Kudryavtsev | 7 | 6
(United States) Rhyne Williams | 5 | 2
WC | (Australia) Blake Mott | 6 | 7
(Belgium) Arthur De Greef | 4 | 5
(Slovakia) Jozef Kovalík | 6 | 6
(France) Gianni Mina | 3 | 4
PR | (United States) Tennys Sandgren | 6 | 4 | 1
19 | (Japan) Yūichi Sugita | 3 | 6 | 6

Second round
13 | (Russia) Alexander Kudryavtsev | 6 | 6
WC | (Australia) Blake Mott | 2 | 4
(Slovakia) Jozef Kovalík | 2 | 1
19 | (Japan) Yūichi Sugita | 6 | 6

Qualifying competition
13 | (Russia) Alexander Kudryavtsev | 7 | 6
19 | (Japan) Yūichi Sugita | 5 | 4

=== Fourteenth qualifier ===
First round
14 | (Kazakhstan) Aleksandr Nedovyesov | 6 | 6
WC | (Australia) Harry Bourchier | 0 | 2
(Poland) Łukasz Kubot | 6 | 1 | 6
(France) David Guez | 3 | 6 | 3
(Hungary) Márton Fucsovics | 6 | 6
(Chile) Hans Podlipnik-Castillo | 4 | 3
(Australia) Benjamin Mitchell | 6^{4} | 4
26 | (Ukraine) Illya Marchenko | 7^{7} | 6

Second round
14 | (Kazakhstan) Aleksandr Nedovyesov | 4 | 3
(Poland) Łukasz Kubot | 6 | 6
(Hungary) Márton Fucsovics | 6 | 4 | 7
26 | (Ukraine) Illya Marchenko | 3 | 6 | 9

Qualifying competition
(Poland) Łukasz Kubot | 2 | 2
26 | (Ukraine) Illya Marchenko | 6 | 6

=== Fifteenth qualifier ===
First round
15 | (Russia) Evgeny Donskoy | 6 | 1 | 6
(India) Yuki Bhambri | 4 | 6 | 8
(Japan) Yoshihito Nishioka | 6 | 6
(Chile) Gonzalo Lama | 2 | 1
(Italy) Roberto Marcora | 6^{5} | 5
(United States) Chase Buchanan | 7^{7} | 7
(Georgia (country)) Nikoloz Basilashvili | 6 | 6^{4} | 6
32 | (Croatia) Mate Delić | 3 | 7^{7} | 8

Second round
(India) Yuki Bhambri | 7^{10} | 6
(Japan) Yoshihito Nishioka | 6^{8} | 3
(United States) Chase Buchanan | 4 | 6 | 6
32 | (Croatia) Mate Delić | 6 | 1 | 4

Qualifying competition
(India) Yuki Bhambri | 6 | 6
(United States) Chase Buchanan | 3 | 4

=== Sixteenth qualifier ===
First round
16 | (Spain) Adrián Menéndez-Maceiras | 6^{5} | 7^{7} | 6
(Italy) Stefano Travaglia | 7^{7} | 6^{4} | 3
(Italy) Andrea Arnaboldi | 6 | 7^{7}
(France) Jonathan Eysseric | 2 | 6^{0}
(Serbia) Ilija Bozoljac | 3 | 6^{5}
(France) Laurent Lokoli | 6 | 7^{7}
(Germany) Peter Torebko | 1 | 7^{8} | 6
25 | (Portugal) Gastão Elias | 6 | 6^{6} | 3

Second round
16 | (Spain) Adrián Menéndez-Maceiras | 4 | 6^{7}
(Italy) Andrea Arnaboldi | 6 | 7^{9}
(France) Laurent Lokoli | 3 | 7^{7} | 6
(Germany) Peter Torebko | 6 | 6^{3} | 1

Qualifying competition
(Italy) Andrea Arnaboldi | 4 | 6 | 4
(France) Laurent Lokoli | 6 | 3 | 6
