= 2015 Australian Open – Girls' singles =

Girls' singles
- 2015 Australian Open

Final
- Champion: (Slovakia) Tereza Mihalíková
- Runner-up: (United Kingdom) Katie Swan
- Score: 6–1, 6–4

Events
Singles	men	women		boys	girls
Doubles	men	women	mixed	boys	girls
WC Singles	men	women	quad
WC Doubles	men	women	quad
Legends	men	women	mixed
- Australian Open

Tereza Mihalíková won the title, defeating Katie Swan in the final, 6–1, 6–4.

Elizaveta Kulichkova was the defending champion, but chose to participate in the women's qualifying competition where she lost to Petra Martić in the second round.

== Seeds ==
1. (China) Xu Shilin (third round)
2. (Switzerland) Jil Teichmann (second round)
3. (Czech Republic) Markéta Vondroušová (first round)
4. (Spain) Aliona Bolsova Zadoinov (quarterfinals)
5. (Hungary) Dalma Gálfi (semifinals)
6. (Australia) Kimberly Birrell (third round)
7. (Australia) Naiktha Bains (second round)
8. (France) Fiona Ferro (first round)

9. (Brazil) Luisa Stefani (second round)
10. (Russia) Anna Blinkova (third round)
11. (United States) Raveena Kingsley (quarterfinals)
12. (China) Zheng Wushuang (second round)
13. (Australia) Seone Mendez (first round)
14. (United Kingdom) Katie Swan (final)
15. (Czech Republic) Miriam Kolodziejová (second round)
16. (Indonesia) Tami Grende (first round)

== Draw ==
Key

- Q = Qualifier
- WC = Wild card
- LL = Lucky loser
- Alt = Alternate
- ITF = ITF entry
- PR = Protected ranking
- SR = Special ranking
- SE = Special exempt
- JE = Junior exempt
- JR = Junior Accelerator Programme entrant
- CO = College Accelerator Programme entrant
- NG = Next Gen Accelerator Program entrant
- w/o = Walkover
- r = Retired
- d = Defaulted

=== Finals ===
Quarterfinals
14	(United Kingdom) Katie Swan	6	6
11	(United States) Raveena Kingsley	4	3
4	(Spain) Aliona Bolsova Zadoinov	1	6^{4}
5	(Hungary) Dalma Gálfi	6	7^{7}
(Slovenia) Manca Pislak	2	2
(Belgium) Greet Minnen	6	6
(Canada) Charlotte Robillard-Millette	2	2
(Slovakia) Tereza Mihalíková	6	6

Semifinals
14	(United Kingdom) Katie Swan	0	7^{7}	7
5	(Hungary) Dalma Gálfi	6	6^{5}	5
(Belgium) Greet Minnen	4	5
(Slovakia) Tereza Mihalíková	6	7

Final
14	(United Kingdom) Katie Swan	1	4
(Slovakia) Tereza Mihalíková	6	6

=== Top half ===
==== Section 1 ====
First round
1	(China) Xu Shilin	6	6
Q	(Australia) Kaylah McPhee	4	1
Q	(South Africa) Katie Poluta	4	3
(India) Pranjala Yadlapalli	6	6
(United States) Jessica Ho	6	6
WC	(Australia) Jaimee Fourlis	4	0
Q	(New Zealand) Jade Lewis	2	2
14	(United Kingdom) Katie Swan	6	6
11	(United States) Raveena Kingsley	6	7^{7}
(Czech Republic) Monika Kilnarová	1	6^{5}
(Belarus) Vera Lapko	6	6
WC	(Australia) Baijing Lin	4	4
(Slovakia) Viktória Kužmová	4	6	6
(Denmark) Emilie Francati	6	4	2
(France) Lucie Wargnier	5	0
7	(Australia) Naiktha Bains	7	6

Second round
1	(China) S Xu	6	6
(India) P Yadlapalli	3	0
(United States) J Ho	2	0
14	(United Kingdom) K Swan	6	6
11	(United States) R Kingsley	5	6	9
(Belarus) V Lapko	7	2	7
(Slovakia) V Kužmová	6	3	6
7	(Australia) N Bains	0	6	1

Third round
1	(China) S Xu	2	2
14	(United Kingdom) K Swan	6	6
11	(United States) R Kingsley	6	6
(Slovakia) V Kužmová	4	1

Quarterfinals
14	(United Kingdom) K Swan	6	6
11	(United States) R Kingsley	4	3

==== Section 2 ====
First round
4	(Spain) Aliona Bolsova Zadoinov	7^{7}	6
Q	(Australia) Anja Dokic	6^{3}	3
(United States) Mia Horvit	3	3
(France) Margot Yerolymos	6	6
(Thailand) Tamachan Momkoonthod	7	3	3
(Australia) Destanee Aiava	5	6	6
(Slovenia) Nina Potočnik	1	3
15	(Czech Republic) Miriam Kolodziejová	6	6
10	(Russia) Anna Blinkova	6	5	6
(Indonesia) Deria Nur Haliza	2	7	4
(Canada) Katherine Sebov	6	6
WC	(Australia) Petra Hule	1	3
WC	(China) Gao Xinyu	7^{7}	3	9
(Australia) Maddison Inglis	6^{5}	6	7
Q	(Japan) Kimika Sakata	2	0
5	(Hungary) Dalma Gálfi	6	6

Second round
4	(Spain) A Bolsova Zadoinov	6	5	6
(France) M Yerolymos	3	7	2
(Australia) D Aiava	6	7^{7}
15	(Czech Republic) M Kolodziejová	3	6^{5}
10	(Russia) A Blinkova	6	0
(Canada) K Sebov	2	0^{r}
WC	(China) X Gao	4	2
5	(Hungary) D Gálfi	6	6

Third round
4	(Spain) A Bolsova Zadoinov	6	6
(Australia) D Aiava	1	1
10	(Russia) A Blinkova	5	5
5	(Hungary) D Gálfi	7	7

Quarterfinals
4	(Spain) A Bolsova Zadoinov	1	6^{4}
5	(Hungary) D Gálfi	6	7^{7}

=== Bottom half ===
==== Section 3 ====
First round
8	(France) Fiona Ferro	3	4
Q	(Russia) Anastasia Gasanova	6	6
WC	(Australia) Violet Apisah	3	6	6
(Italy) Bianca Turati	6	4	3
(Slovenia) Manca Pislak	6	6
WC	(Australia) Chloe Hule	2	2
WC	(Australia) Michaela Haet	0	3
12	(China) Zheng Wushuang	6	6
13	(Australia) Seone Mendez	6^{5}	6^{5}
(Belgium) Greet Minnen	7^{7}	7^{7}
(United States) Olivia Hauger	0	6	6
(India) Ojasvinee Singh	6	4	1
(Japan) Chihiro Muramatsu	7	6
(United Kingdom) Emily Arbuthnott	5	0
(Australia) Olivia Tjandramulia	6	6
3	(Czech Republic) Markéta Vondroušová	1	3

Second round
Q	(Russia) A Gasanova	7	7
WC	(Australia) V Apisah	5	5
(Slovenia) M Pislak	7^{7}	6
12	(China) W Zheng	6^{4}	4
(Belgium) G Minnen	7^{7}	6
(United States) O Hauger	6^{2}	1
(Japan) C Muramatsu	6	6
(Australia) O Tjandramulia	4	4

Third round
Q	(Russia) A Gasanova	4	6^{3}
(Slovenia) M Pislak	6	7^{7}
(Belgium) G Minnen	6	7
(Japan) C Muramatsu	3	5

Quarterfinals
(Slovenia) M Pislak	2	2
(Belgium) G Minnen	6	6

==== Section 4 ====
First round
6	(Australia) Kimberly Birrell	6	6
(United Kingdom) Maia Lumsden	3	3
(Germany) Katharina Hobgarski	1	6	6
(Ukraine) Olga Fridman	6	4	4
(Australia) Priscilla Hon	6^{3}	7	3
(Canada) Charlotte Robillard-Millette	7^{7}	5	6
(China) Yuan Yue	5	4
9	(Brazil) Luisa Stefani	7	6
16	(Indonesia) Tami Grende	3	1
(Australia) Sara Tomic	6	6
(United States) Raquel Pedraza	2	2
(France) Tessah Andrianjafitrimo	6	6
(Slovakia) Tereza Mihalíková	6	6^{2}	6
WC	(Australia) Nicole Kraemer	3	7^{7}	4
Q	(China) Ma Shuyue	2	2
2	(Switzerland) Jil Teichmann	6	6

Second round
6	(Australia) K Birrell	2	6	6
(Germany) K Hobgarski	6	2	4
(Canada) C Robillard-Millette	7	6
9	(Brazil) L Stefani	5	1
(Australia) S Tomic	6	6
(France) T Andrianjafitrimo	2	3
(Slovakia) T Mihalíková	5	7^{7}	7
2	(Switzerland) J Teichmann	7	6^{5}	5

Third round
6	(Australia) K Birrell	3	4
(Canada) C Robillard-Millette	6	6
(Australia) S Tomic	5	6	2
(Slovakia) T Mihalíková	7	2	6

Quarterfinals
(Canada) C Robillard-Millette	2	2
(Slovakia) T Mihalíková	6	6
