= Katie Poluta =

South African tennis player

- Country (sports): South Africa
- Born: 29 May 1997 (age 27); Cape Town, South Africa
- Height: 1.58 m (5 ft 2 in)
- Plays: Left-handed (double-handed backhand)
- College: University of Texas at Austin
- Prize money: $0

Singles
- Career record: 0–1
- Career titles: 0

Grand Slam singles results
- Australian Open Junior: 1R (2015)

Doubles
- Career record: 0–0
- Career titles: 0

Grand Slam doubles results
- Australian Open Junior: 2R (2015)

Team competitions
- Fed Cup: 2–1
- Last updated on: 21 April 2018.

Katie Poluta (born 29 May 1997) is a South African tennis player.

Poluta has represented South Africa in Fed Cup, where she has a win-loss record of 2–1.
