= 2015 Australian Open – Girls' doubles =

Girls' doubles
- 2015 Australian Open

Final
- Champions: (Czech Republic) Miriam Kolodziejová (Czech Republic) Markéta Vondroušová
- Runners-up: (Germany) Katharina Hobgarski (Belgium) Greet Minnen
- Score: 7–5, 6–4

Events
| Singles | men | women | | boys | girls |
| Doubles | men | women | mixed | boys | girls |
| WC Singles | men | women | quad |
| WC Doubles | men | women | quad |
| Legends | men | women | mixed |
- Australian Open

Anhelina Kalinina and Elizaveta Kulichkova were the defending champions, but both players chose not to compete in 2015.

Miriam Kolodziejová and Markéta Vondroušová won the title, defeating Katharina Hobgarski and Greet Minnen in the final, 7–5, 6–4.

== Seeds ==
1. (Russia) Anna Blinkova / (Hungary) Dalma Gálfi (second round)
2. (Czech Republic) Miriam Kolodziejová / (Czech Republic) Markéta Vondroušová (champions)
3. (Australia) Naiktha Bains / (Brazil) Luisa Stefani (second round)
4. (Australia) Sara Tomic / (China) Xu Shilin (semifinals)
5. (Australia) Priscilla Hon / (Switzerland) Jil Teichmann (second round)
6. (Spain) Aliona Bolsova Zadoinov / (Canada) Katherine Sebov (quarterfinals)
7. (Australia) Destanee Aiava / (Australia) Kimberly Birrell (second round)
8. (United Kingdom) Maia Lumsden / (United Kingdom) Katie Swan (second round)

== Draw ==
Key

- Q = Qualifier
- WC = Wild card
- LL = Lucky loser
- Alt = Alternate
- ITF = ITF entry
- PR = Protected ranking
- SR = Special ranking
- SE = Special exempt
- JE = Junior exempt
- JR = Junior Accelerator Programme entrant
- CO = College Accelerator Programme entrant
- NG = Next Gen Accelerator Program entrant
- w/o = Walkover
- r = Retired
- d = Defaulted

=== Finals ===
Semifinals
(United Kingdom) Emily Arbuthnott (Denmark) Emilie Francati | 5 | 6 | [7]
(Germany) Katharina Hobgarski (Belgium) Greet Minnen | 7 | 4 | [10]
4 | (Australia) Sara Tomic (China) Xu Shilin | 1 | 2
2 | (Czech Republic) Miriam Kolodziejová (Czech Republic) Markéta Vondroušová | 6 | 6

Final
(Germany) Katharina Hobgarski (Belgium) Greet Minnen | 5 | 4
2 | (Czech Republic) Miriam Kolodziejová (Czech Republic) Markéta Vondroušová | 7 | 6

=== Top half ===
First round
1 | (Russia) Anna Blinkova (Hungary) Dalma Gálfi | 7^{7} | 4 | [10]
(Australia) Seone Mendez (Canada) Charlotte Robillard-Millette | 6^{4} | 6 | [6]
(United States) Mia Horvit (France) Lucie Wargnier | 4 | 6 | [3]
(China) Gao Xinyu (Australia) Olivia Tjandramulia | 6 | 4 | [10]
(United Kingdom) Emily Arbuthnott (Denmark) Emilie Francati | 7^{7} | 2 | [10]
(United States) Jessica Ho (United States) Raveena Kingsley | 6^{3} | 6 | [8]
WC | (Australia) Michaela Haet (Australia) Nicole Kraemer | 3 | 0
5 | (Australia) Priscilla Hon (Switzerland) Jil Teichmann | 6 | 6
3 | (Australia) Naiktha Bains (Brazil) Luisa Stefani | 7 | 6
WC | (Australia) Chloe Hule (Australia) Petra Hule | 5 | 3
(Germany) Katharina Hobgarski (Belgium) Greet Minnen | 6 | 6^{2} | [11]
(Thailand) Tamachan Momkoonthod (India) Ojasvinee Singh | 3 | 7^{7} | [9]
(Ukraine) Olga Fridman (Russia) Elina Nepliy | 6 | 7^{7}
WC | (Australia) Aleksa Cveticanin (Australia) Kaylah McPhee | 3 | 6^{2}
(New Zealand) Jade Lewis (Japan) Kimika Sakata | 3 | 3
6 | (Spain) Aliona Bolsova Zadoinov (Canada) Katherine Sebov | 6 | 6

Second round
1 | (Russia) A Blinkova (Hungary) D Gálfi | 6^{5} | 4
(China) X Gao (Australia) O Tjandramulia | 7^{7} | 6
(United Kingdom) E Arbuthnott (Denmark) E Francati | 7 | 7
5 | (Australia) P Hon (Switzerland) J Teichmann | 5 | 5
3 | (Australia) N Bains (Brazil) L Stefani | 4 | 6 | [8]
(Germany) K Hobgarski (Belgium) G Minnen | 6 | 3 | [10]
(Ukraine) O Fridman (Russia) E Nepliy | 3 | 4
6 | (Spain) A Bolsova Zadoinov (Canada) K Sebov | 6 | 6

Quarterfinals
(China) X Gao (Australia) O Tjandramulia | 4 | 7^{7} | [7]
(United Kingdom) E Arbuthnott (Denmark) E Francati | 6 | 6^{3} | [10]
(Germany) K Hobgarski (Belgium) G Minnen | 2 | 6 | [10]
6 | (Spain) A Bolsova Zadoinov (Canada) K Sebov | 6 | 2 | [7]

Semifinals
(United Kingdom) E Arbuthnott (Denmark) E Francati | 5 | 6 | [7]
(Germany) K Hobgarski (Belgium) G Minnen | 7 | 4 | [10]

=== Bottom half ===
First round
8 | (United Kingdom) Maia Lumsden (United Kingdom) Katie Swan | 6 | 3 | [10]
(Indonesia) Tami Grende (France) Margot Yerolymos | 1 | 6 | [3]
(Czech Republic) Monika Kilnarová (Slovakia) Viktória Kužmová | 5 | 3
(United States) Raquel Pedraza (China) Zheng Wushuang | 7 | 6
WC | (Australia) Violet Apisah (Australia) Sasha Bollweg | 6 | 5 | [13]
(France) Tessah Andrianjafitrimo (Italy) Bianca Turati | 3 | 7 | [15]
(Japan) Chihiro Muramatsu (India) Pranjala Yadlapalli | 6^{5} | 0
4 | (Australia) Sara Tomic (China) Xu Shilin | 7^{7} | 6
7 | (Australia) Destanee Aiava (Australia) Kimberly Birrell | 6 | 6
(China) Ma Shuyue (China) Yuan Yue | 3 | 2
(Belarus) Vera Lapko (Slovakia) Tereza Mihalíková | 6 | 6
(Slovenia) Manca Pislak (Slovenia) Nina Potočnik | 1 | 4
(France) Fiona Ferro (United States) Olivia Hauger | 3 | 6^{2}
(Indonesia) Deria Nur Haliza (South Africa) Katie Poluta | 6 | 7^{7}
(Australia) Jaimee Fourlis (Australia) Maddison Inglis | 2 | 4
2 | (Czech Republic) Miriam Kolodziejová (Czech Republic) Markéta Vondroušová | 6 | 6

Second round
8 | (United Kingdom) M Lumsden (United Kingdom) K Swan | 6 | 4 | [5]
(United States) R Pedraza (China) W Zheng | 0 | 6 | [10]
(France) T Andrianjafitrimo (Italy) B Turati | 4 | 4
4 | (Australia) S Tomic (China) S Xu | 6 | 6
7 | (Australia) D Aiava (Australia) K Birrell | 3 | 1
(Belarus) V Lapko (Slovakia) T Mihalíková | 6 | 6
(Indonesia) D Nur Haliza (South Africa) K Poluta | 0 | 2
2 | (Czech Republic) M Kolodziejová (Czech Republic) M Vondroušová | 6 | 6

Quarterfinals
(United States) R Pedraza (China) W Zheng | 4 | 6 | [9]
4 | (Australia) S Tomic (China) S Xu | 6 | 1 | [11]
(Belarus) V Lapko (Slovakia) T Mihalíková | 5 | 5
2 | (Czech Republic) M Kolodziejová (Czech Republic) M Vondroušová | 7 | 7

Semifinals
4 | (Australia) S Tomic (China) S Xu | 1 | 2
2 | (Czech Republic) M Kolodziejová (Czech Republic) M Vondroušová | 6 | 6
