= 2015 Australian Open – Boys' singles =

Boys' singles
- 2015 Australian Open

Final
- Champion: (Russia) Roman Safiullin
- Runner-up: (South Korea) Hong Seong-chan
- Score: 7–5, 7–6^{(7–2)}

Events
Singles	men	women		boys	girls
Doubles	men	women	mixed	boys	girls
WC Singles	men	women	quad
WC Doubles	men	women	quad
Legends	men	women	mixed
- Australian Open

Roman Safiullin defeated Hong Seong-chan in the final, 7–5, 7–6^{(7–2)} to win the boys' singles tennis title at the 2015 Australian Open.

Alexander Zverev was the defending champion, but chose to participate in the men's singles qualifying and lost to John-Patrick Smith in the first round.

== Seeds ==
1. (Russia) Roman Safiullin (champion)
2. (Brazil) Orlando Luz (first round)
3. (United States) Taylor Harry Fritz (quarterfinals)
4. (South Korea) Chung Yun-seong (second round)
5. (United States) Michael Mmoh (first round)
6. (South Korea) Lee Duck-hee (quarterfinals)
7. (South Korea) Hong Seong-chan (final)
8. (Japan) Jumpei Yamasaki (first round)

9. (Sweden) Mikael Ymer (second round)
10. (France) Corentin Denolly (first round)
11. (Netherlands) Tim van Rijthoven (third round)
12. (Russia) Bogdan Bobrov (third round)
13. (Peru) Juan José Rosas (second round)
14. (Greece) Stefanos Tsitsipas (quarterfinals)
15. (South Korea) Oh Chan-yeong (second round)
16. (Australia) Akira Santillan (semifinals)

== Draw ==
Key

- Q = Qualifier
- WC = Wild card
- LL = Lucky loser
- Alt = Alternate
- ITF = ITF entry
- PR = Protected ranking
- SR = Special ranking
- SE = Special exempt
- JE = Junior exempt
- JR = Junior Accelerator Programme entrant
- CO = College Accelerator Programme entrant
- NG = Next Gen Accelerator Program entrant
- w/o = Walkover
- r = Retired
- d = Defaulted

=== Finals ===
Quarterfinals
1	(Russia) Roman Safiullin	6	6
(Australia) Marc Polmans	4	2
14	(Greece) Stefanos Tsitsipas	6	4	1
(Uzbekistan) Jurabek Karimov	3	6	6
7	(South Korea) Hong Seong-chan	6^{4}	7^{7}	6
3	(United States) Taylor Harry Fritz	7^{7}	6^{4}	0
6	(South Korea) Lee Duck-hee	4	6	3
16	(Australia) Akira Santillan	6	3	6

Semifinals
1	(Russia) Roman Safiullin	6	6^{4}	6
(Uzbekistan) Jurabek Karimov	3	7^{7}	1
7	(South Korea) Hong Seong-chan	6	7^{7}
16	(Australia) Akira Santillan	2	6^{2}

Final
1	(Russia) Roman Safiullin	7	7^{7}
7	(South Korea) Hong Seong-chan	5	6^{2}

=== Top half ===
==== Section 1 ====
First round
1	(Russia) Roman Safiullin	6	6
(Georgia (country)) Aleksandre Bakshi	2	2
(Hungary) Máté Valkusz	5	7	6
(China) Te Rigele	7	5	2
(Australia) Jake Delaney	3	6	6
(Switzerland) Johan Nikles	6	3	4
(Chinese Taipei) Wu Tung-lin	7	3	2
15	(South Korea) Oh Chan-yeong	5	6	6
10	(France) Corentin Denolly	2	6^{4}
(Australia) Marc Polmans	6	7^{7}
(Poland) Hubert Hurkacz	6^{3}	6	7
Q	(Canada) Denis Shapovalov	7^{7}	3	9
Q	(Japan) Yosuke Watanuki	6^{7}	6	5
WC	(Australia) Alexei Popyrin	7^{9}	1	0^{r}
(India) Sumit Nagal	6	4	6
5	(United States) Michael Mmoh	2	6	4

Second round
1	(Russia) R Safiullin	6	6
(Hungary) M Valkusz	2	4
(Australia) J Delaney	6	6
15	(South Korea) C-y Oh	0	2
(Australia) M Polmans	6	6
Q	(Canada) D Shapovalov	1	1
Q	(Japan) Y Watanuki	2	3
(India) S Nagal	6	6

Third round
1	(Russia) R Safiullin	6	6
(Australia) J Delaney	3	3
(Australia) M Polmans	6	6
(India) S Nagal	1	1

Quarterfinals
1	(Russia) R Safiullin	6	6
(Australia) M Polmans	4	2

==== Section 2 ====
First round
4	(South Korea) Chung Yun-seong	6	6
(South Africa) Lloyd Harris	3	3
(Spain) Eduard Güell Bartrina	7^{7}	1	2
(Russia) Alexander Bublik	6^{2}	6	6
Q	(Denmark) Christian Sigsgaard	6	6
WC	(Australia) Scott Jones	1	3
(Germany) Fabian Fallert	3	2
14	(Greece) Stefanos Tsitsipas	6	6
11	(Netherlands) Tim van Rijthoven	4	6	6
WC	(Australia) Mitchell Harper	6	3	2
Q	(New Zealand) William Matheson	1	1
(United States) William Blumberg	6	6
(Uzbekistan) Jurabek Karimov	6	6
SE	(Italy) Andrea Pellegrino	3	3
(South Korea) Kwon Soon-woo	6	7^{7}
8	(Japan) Jumpei Yamasaki	3	6^{3}

Second round
4	(South Korea) Y-s Chung	6^{2}	3
(Russia) A Bublik	7^{7}	6
Q	(Denmark) C Sigsgaard	4	3
14	(Greece) S Tsitsipas	6	6
11	(Netherlands) T van Rijthoven	3	6	6
(United States) W Blumberg	6	3	4
(Uzbekistan) J Karimov	6	6
(South Korea) S-w Kwon	3	1

Third round
(Russia) A Bublik	5	5
14	(Greece) S Tsitsipas	7	7
11	(Netherlands) T van Rijthoven	6^{5}	2
(Uzbekistan) J Karimov	7^{7}	6

Quarterfinals
14	(Greece) S Tsitsipas	6	4	1
(Uzbekistan) J Karimov	3	6	6

=== Bottom half ===
==== Section 3 ====
First round
7	(South Korea) Hong Seong-chan	7	5	8
WC	(Australia) Alex De Minaur	5	7	6
(Germany) Louis Wessels	5	3
(Japan) Sora Fukuda	7	6
(Serbia) Miomir Kecmanović	6	6
WC	(Australia) Brian Tran	3	3
WC	(China) Wu Yibing	6^{6}	3
12	(Russia) Bogdan Bobrov	7^{8}	6
13	(Peru) Juan José Rosas	6	6
(Australia) Daniel Nolan	4	4
Q	(Japan) Yuya Ito	3	0
SE	(Switzerland) Marko Osmakcic	6	6
(Norway) Viktor Durasovic	3	4
(France) Mandresy Rakotomalala	6	6
(Slovakia) Alex Molčan	1	4
3	(United States) Taylor Harry Fritz	6	6

Second round
7	(South Korea) S-c Hong	6	6
(Japan) S Fukuda	3	4
(Serbia) M Kecmanović	5	5
12	(Russia) B Bobrov	7	7
13	(Peru) JJ Rosas	1	2
SE	(Switzerland) M Osmakcic	6	6
(France) M Rakotomalala	1	2
3	(United States) TH Fritz	6	6

Third round
7	(South Korea) S-c Hong	6	6
12	(Russia) B Bobrov	1	0
SE	(Switzerland) M Osmakcic	1	1
3	(United States) TH Fritz	6	6

Quarterfinals
7	(South Korea) S-c Hong	6^{4}	7^{7}	6
3	(United States) TH Fritz	7^{7}	6^{4}	0

==== Section 4 ====
First round
6	(South Korea) Lee Duck-hee	7^{7}	6
(Tunisia) Aziz Dougaz	6^{4}	2
(Croatia) Domagoj Bilješko	3	7	6
WC	(Australia) Daniel Hobart	6	5	2
(United States) Sameer Kumar	6	1	6
Q	(Japan) Renta Tokuda	4	6	3
WC	(Australia) Blake Ellis	2	3
9	(Sweden) Mikael Ymer	6	6
16	(Australia) Akira Santillan	6	6
(Russia) Boris Pokotilov	4	2
(Vietnam) Lý Hoàng Nam	7^{7}	7
(France) Corentin Moutet	6^{4}	5
Q	(Chinese Taipei) Lo Chien-hsun	7	7
(Denmark) Benjamin Hannestad	5	5
Q	(Germany) Tim Sandkaulen	6	6
2	(Brazil) Orlando Luz	1	2

Second round
6	(South Korea) D-h Lee	6	6
(Croatia) D Bilješko	2	1
(United States) S Kumar	6	1	6
9	(Sweden) M Ymer	4	6	4
16	(Australia) A Santillan	4	7^{7}	6
(Vietnam) NH Lý	6	6^{3}	4
Q	(Chinese Taipei) C-h Lo	6^{5}	6	6
Q	(Germany) T Sandkaulen	7^{7}	1	3

Third round
6	(South Korea) D-h Lee	2	6	7
(United States) S Kumar	6	0	5
16	(Australia) A Santillan	7	2	6
Q	(Chinese Taipei) C-h Lo	5	6	4

Quarterfinals
6	(South Korea) D-h Lee	4	6	3
16	(Australia) A Santillan	6	3	6
