= 2015 Australian Open – Women's doubles =

Women's doubles
- 2015 Australian Open

Final
- Champion: (United States) Bethanie Mattek-Sands (Czech Republic) Lucie Šafářová
- Runner-up: (Chinese Taipei) Chan Yung-jan (China) Zheng Jie
- Score: 6–4, 7–6^{(7–5)}

Details
- Draw: 64
- Seeds: 16

Events
Singles	men	women		boys	girls
Doubles	men	women	mixed	boys	girls
WC Singles	men	women	quad
WC Doubles	men	women	quad
Legends	men	women	mixed
- Australian Open

Bethanie Mattek-Sands and Lucie Šafářová defeated Chan Yung-jan and Zheng Jie in the final, 6–4, 7–6^{(7–5)}, to win the women's doubles tennis title at the 2015 Australian Open. Mattek-Sands and Šafářová were playing for the first time as a team in a tournament and each won their first Grand Slam women's doubles title. The victory made them the first new pairing to win the women's doubles tournament at the Australian Open since 2005, as well as the first to win a Grand Slam women's doubles title since the 2007 US Open. After defeating five seeded pairings en route to the win, they became the first unseeded women's doubles duo to clinch the title at the Australian Open since 2012.

Sara Errani and Roberta Vinci were the two-time defending champions, but they lost to Julia Görges and Anna-Lena Grönefeld in the third round.

== Seeds ==
1. (Italy) Sara Errani / (Italy) Roberta Vinci (third round)
2. (Chinese Taipei) Hsieh Su-wei / (India) Sania Mirza (second round)
3. (Russia) Ekaterina Makarova / (Russia) Elena Vesnina (quarterfinals)
4. (Switzerland) Martina Hingis / (Italy) Flavia Pennetta (third round)
5. (United States) Raquel Kops-Jones / (United States) Abigail Spears (quarterfinals)
6. (Spain) Garbiñe Muguruza / (Spain) Carla Suárez Navarro (second round)
7. (France) Caroline Garcia / (Slovenia) Katarina Srebotnik (third round)
8. (Chinese Taipei) Chan Hao-ching / (Czech Republic) Květa Peschke (first round)
9. (Czech Republic) Andrea Hlaváčková / (Czech Republic) Lucie Hradecká (third round)
10. (Hungary) Tímea Babos / (France) Kristina Mladenovic (second round)
11. (Spain) Anabel Medina Garrigues / (Kazakhstan) Yaroslava Shvedova (second round)
12. (Russia) Alla Kudryavtseva / (Russia) Anastasia Pavlyuchenkova (third round)
13. (Netherlands) Michaëlla Krajicek / (Czech Republic) Barbora Záhlavová-Strýcová (semifinals)
14. (Chinese Taipei) Chan Yung-jan / (China) Zheng Jie (final)
15. (Japan) Kimiko Date-Krumm / (Australia) Casey Dellacqua (second round)
16. (Germany) Julia Görges / (Germany) Anna-Lena Grönefeld (semifinals, retired)

== Draw ==
Key

- Q = Qualifier
- WC = Wild card
- LL = Lucky loser
- Alt = Alternate
- ITF = ITF entry
- PR = Protected ranking
- SR = Special ranking
- SE = Special exempt
- JE = Junior exempt
- JR = Junior Accelerator Programme entrant
- CO = College Accelerator Programme entrant
- NG = Next Gen Accelerator Program entrant
- w/o = Walkover
- r = Retired
- d = Defaulted

=== Finals ===
Quarterfinals
16	(Germany) Julia Görges (Germany) Anna-Lena Grönefeld	6	7
Alt	(Netherlands) Kiki Bertens (Sweden) Johanna Larsson	2	5
3	(Russia) Ekaterina Makarova (Russia) Elena Vesnina	6^{5}	6	2
PR	(United States) Bethanie Mattek-Sands (Czech Republic) Lucie Šafářová	7^{7}	4	6
(Poland) Klaudia Jans-Ignacik (Slovenia) Andreja Klepač	1	2
14	(Chinese Taipei) Chan Yung-jan (China) Zheng Jie	6	6
5	(United States) Raquel Kops-Jones (United States) Abigail Spears	6	3	6^{3}
13	(Netherlands) Michaëlla Krajicek (Czech Republic) Barbora Záhlavová-Strýcová	3	6	7^{7}

Semifinals
16	(Germany) Julia Görges (Germany) Anna-Lena Grönefeld	0	0^{r}
PR	(United States) Bethanie Mattek-Sands (Czech Republic) Lucie Šafářová	6	0
14	(Chinese Taipei) Chan Yung-jan (China) Zheng Jie	6	6
13	(Netherlands) Michaëlla Krajicek (Czech Republic) Barbora Záhlavová-Strýcová	3	2

Final
PR	(United States) Bethanie Mattek-Sands (Czech Republic) Lucie Šafářová	6	7^{7}
14	(Chinese Taipei) Chan Yung-jan (China) Zheng Jie	4	6^{5}

=== Top half ===
==== Section 1 ====
First round
1	(Italy) S Errani (Italy) R Vinci	6	6
(Czech Republic) Ka Plíšková (Slovakia) A Schmiedlová	2	0
(Georgia (country)) O Kalashnikova (Japan) K Nara	3	5
(Germany) M Barthel (Luxembourg) M Minella	6	7
(Croatia) D Jurak (United States) M Moulton-Levy	6	4	6^{5}
(Kazakhstan) Z Diyas (South Africa) C Scheepers	4	6	7^{7}
WC	(Australia) M Inglis (Australia) A Nancarrow	4	1
16	(Germany) J Görges (Germany) A-L Grönefeld	6	6
11	(Spain) A Medina Garrigues (Kazakhstan) Y Shvedova	6	6
Alt	(United States) I Falconi (Croatia) P Martić	3	3
Alt	(Netherlands) K Bertens (Sweden) J Larsson	7^{9}	6
(Croatia) M Lučić-Baroni (United States) L Raymond	6^{7}	3
(Australia) An Rodionova (Australia) Ar Rodionova	6	6
WC	(Australia) N Bains (Australia) S Tomic	2	2
(Russia) S Kuznetsova (Australia) S Stosur	6	6
8	(Chinese Taipei) H-c Chan (Czech Republic) K Peschke	3	2

Second round
1	(Italy) S Errani (Italy) R Vinci	6	6
(Germany) M Barthel (Luxembourg) M Minella	0	2
(Kazakhstan) Z Diyas (South Africa) C Scheepers	6^{4}	2
16	(Germany) J Görges (Germany) A-L Grönefeld	7^{7}	6
11	(Spain) A Medina Garrigues (Kazakhstan) Y Shvedova	6	2	4
Alt	(Netherlands) K Bertens (Sweden) J Larsson	3	6	6
(Australia) An Rodionova (Australia) Ar Rodionova	2	4
(Russia) S Kuznetsova (Australia) S Stosur	6	6

Third round
1	(Italy) S Errani (Italy) R Vinci	3	6	5
16	(Germany) J Görges (Germany) A-L Grönefeld	6	4	7
Alt	(Netherlands) K Bertens (Sweden) J Larsson	7^{7}	6
(Russia) S Kuznetsova (Australia) S Stosur	6^{5}	3

Quarterfinals
16	(Germany) J Görges (Germany) A-L Grönefeld	6	7
Alt	(Netherlands) K Bertens (Sweden) J Larsson	2	5

==== Section 2 ====
First round
3	(Russia) E Makarova (Russia) E Vesnina	7	6
(United States) M Keys (United States) A Riske	5	1
(United States) C Vandeweghe (Belgium) Y Wickmayer	3	4
(Slovakia) D Cibulková (Belgium) K Flipkens	6	6
(Spain) S Soler Espinosa (Spain) MT Torró Flor	4	6	6
(Switzerland) T Bacsinszky (Ukraine) Y Beygelzimer	6	2	1
(China) S Peng (China) Y Xu	6	5	6^{5}
15	(Japan) K Date-Krumm (Australia) C Dellacqua	4	7	7^{7}
10	(Hungary) T Babos (France) K Mladenovic	6	6
(Serbia) B Jovanovski (Poland) K Piter	1	3
PR	(United States) B Mattek-Sands (Czech Republic) L Šafářová	6	6
PR	(Germany) T Maria (Romania) R Olaru	3	2
Alt	(United States) S Rogers (Croatia) D Vekić	4	6	6
(France) A Cornet (France) P Parmentier	6	2	4
(Germany) A Petkovic (Slovakia) M Rybáriková	4	7	2
7	(France) C Garcia (Slovenia) K Srebotnik	6	5	6

Second round
3	(Russia) E Makarova (Russia) E Vesnina	6	5	6
(Slovakia) D Cibulková (Belgium) K Flipkens	4	7	2
(Spain) S Soler Espinosa (Spain) MT Torró Flor	7	6
15	(Japan) K Date-Krumm (Australia) C Dellacqua	5	2
10	(Hungary) T Babos (France) K Mladenovic	6	6^{2}	4
PR	(United States) B Mattek-Sands (Czech Republic) L Šafářová	4	7^{7}	6
Alt	(United States) S Rogers (Croatia) D Vekić	3	6	3
7	(France) C Garcia (Slovenia) K Srebotnik	6	3	6

Third round
3	(Russia) E Makarova (Russia) E Vesnina	6	6
(Spain) S Soler Espinosa (Spain) MT Torró Flor	1	2
PR	(United States) B Mattek-Sands (Czech Republic) L Šafářová	3	6	6
7	(France) C Garcia (Slovenia) K Srebotnik	6	2	2

Quarterfinals
3	(Russia) E Makarova (Russia) E Vesnina	6^{5}	6	2
PR	(United States) B Mattek-Sands (Czech Republic) L Šafářová	7^{7}	4	6

=== Bottom half ===
==== Section 3 ====
First round
6	(Spain) G Muguruza (Spain) C Suárez Navarro	6	6
(United States) V Lepchenko (United States) A Tatishvili	3	2
(Poland) K Jans-Ignacik (Slovenia) A Klepač	7^{7}	5	7^{7}
(Serbia) J Janković (Spain) A Parra Santonja	6^{5}	7	6^{2}
WC	(Australia) D Gavrilova (Australia) S Sanders	6	3	4
WC	(Australia) M Adamczak (Australia) O Rogowska	2	6	6
(Ukraine) L Kichenok (Ukraine) O Savchuk	0	6^{4}
9	(Czech Republic) A Hlaváčková (Czech Republic) L Hradecká	6	7^{7}
14	(Chinese Taipei) Y-j Chan (China) J Zheng	6	6
(Czech Republic) K Koukalová (Switzerland) S Vögele	3	0
(Spain) L Arruabarrena (Romania) I-C Begu	5	6	6
WC	(China) Z Yang (China) Q Ye	7	4	4
(Chinese Taipei) C-j Chuang (China) S Zhang	3	3
(Slovakia) D Hantuchová (Italy) K Knapp	6	6
(Switzerland) B Bencic (Czech Republic) K Siniaková	6^{3}	2
4	(Switzerland) M Hingis (Italy) F Pennetta	7^{7}	6

Second round
6	(Spain) G Muguruza (Spain) C Suárez Navarro	6^{6}	4
(Poland) K Jans-Ignacik (Slovenia) A Klepač	7^{8}	6
WC	(Australia) M Adamczak (Australia) O Rogowska	3	2
9	(Czech Republic) A Hlaváčková (Czech Republic) L Hradecká	6	6
14	(Chinese Taipei) Y-j Chan (China) J Zheng	6	6
(Spain) L Arruabarrena (Romania) I-C Begu	4	3
(Slovakia) D Hantuchová (Italy) K Knapp	3	7^{7}	2
4	(Switzerland) M Hingis (Italy) F Pennetta	6	6^{5}	6

Third round
(Poland) K Jans-Ignacik (Slovenia) A Klepač	7^{7}	6^{6}	6
9	(Czech Republic) A Hlaváčková (Czech Republic) L Hradecká	6^{5}	7^{8}	2
14	(Chinese Taipei) Y-j Chan (China) J Zheng	6	6
4	(Switzerland) M Hingis (Italy) F Pennetta	3	3

Quarterfinals
(Poland) K Jans-Ignacik (Slovenia) A Klepač	1	2
14	(Chinese Taipei) Y-j Chan (China) J Zheng	6	6

==== Section 4 ====
First round
5	(United States) R Kops-Jones (United States) A Spears	6	7
WC	(Australia) K Birrell (Australia) P Hon	3	5
(Russia) V Diatchenko (Romania) M Niculescu	6	4	6
(United States) L Davis (United States) C McHale	2	6	3
(Germany) A Beck (Israel) S Pe'er	6	5	1^{r}
(Russia) A Panova (United Kingdom) H Watson	2	7	3
(Japan) S Aoyama (Czech Republic) R Voráčová	2	6^{5}
12	(Russia) A Kudryavtseva (Russia) A Pavlyuchenkova	6	7^{7}
13	(Netherlands) M Krajicek (Czech Republic) B Záhlavová-Strýcová	6^{9}	7^{8}	6
(New Zealand) M Erakovic (Puerto Rico) M Puig	7^{11}	6^{6}	3
(Australia) J Gajdošová (Australia) A Tomljanović	6	6
WC	(Australia) J Moore (Australia) A Myers	0	0
(Canada) G Dabrowski (Poland) A Rosolska	6	6
(Zimbabwe) C Black (China) S Zheng	1	4
PR	(Argentina) M Irigoyen (Switzerland) R Oprandi	2	0
2	(Chinese Taipei) S-w Hsieh (India) S Mirza	6	6

Second round
5	(United States) R Kops-Jones (United States) A Spears	6	3	7^{7}
(Russia) V Diatchenko (Romania) M Niculescu	1	6	6^{5}
(Russia) A Panova (United Kingdom) H Watson	0	2
12	(Russia) A Kudryavtseva (Russia) A Pavlyuchenkova	6	6
13	(Netherlands) M Krajicek (Czech Republic) B Záhlavová-Strýcová	7	6
(Australia) J Gajdošová (Australia) A Tomljanović	5	3
(Canada) G Dabrowski (Poland) A Rosolska	7^{7}	6
2	(Chinese Taipei) S-w Hsieh (India) S Mirza	6^{5}	4

Third round
5	(United States) R Kops-Jones (United States) A Spears	6	6
12	(Russia) A Kudryavtseva (Russia) A Pavlyuchenkova	4	4
13	(Netherlands) M Krajicek (Czech Republic) B Záhlavová-Strýcová	6	3	6
(Canada) G Dabrowski (Poland) A Rosolska	2	6	4

Quarterfinals
5	(United States) R Kops-Jones (United States) A Spears	6	3	6^{3}
13	(Netherlands) M Krajicek (Czech Republic) B Záhlavová-Strýcová	3	6	7^{7}
