= 2015 Australian Open – Men's singles =

Men's singles
- 2015 Australian Open

Final
- Champion: (Serbia) Novak Djokovic
- Runner-up: (United Kingdom) Andy Murray
- Score: 7–6^{(7–5)}, 6–7^{(4–7)}, 6–3, 6–0

Details
- Draw: 128 (16Q / 8WC)
- Seeds: 32

Events
Singles	men	women		boys	girls
Doubles	men	women	mixed	boys	girls
WC Singles	men	women	quad
WC Doubles	men	women	quad
Legends	men	women	mixed
- Australian Open

Novak Djokovic defeated Andy Murray in the final, 7–6^{(7–5)}, 6–7^{(4–7)}, 6–3, 6–0 to win the men's singles tennis title at the 2015 Australian Open. It was his fifth Australian Open title and eighth major title overall. It was also Murray's fourth runner-up finish at the event, the most in the Open Era.

Stan Wawrinka was the defending champion, but lost in the semifinals to Djokovic. It was the third consecutive year that the two met at the Australian Open; on each occasion, their encounter went to a fifth set, and the victor of their match would go on to win the title.

Roger Federer's streak of eleven consecutive Australian Open semifinals ended when he lost to Andreas Seppi in the third round. The defeat marked Federer's earliest exit from the tournament since 2001.

Nick Kyrgios was the first teenager to reach the quarterfinals since Andrei Cherkasov in 1990, and the first Australian to do so since Lleyton Hewitt in 2005. He was the first teenager to reach multiple major quarterfinals since Rafael Nadal in 2006.

== Seeds ==
1. (Serbia) Novak Djokovic (champion)
2. (Switzerland) Roger Federer (third round)
3. (Spain) Rafael Nadal (quarterfinals)
4. (Switzerland) Stan Wawrinka (semifinals)
5. (Japan) Kei Nishikori (quarterfinals)
6. (United Kingdom) Andy Murray (final)
7. (Czech Republic) Tomáš Berdych (semifinals)
8. (Canada) Milos Raonic (quarterfinals)
9. (Spain) David Ferrer (fourth round)
10. (Bulgaria) Grigor Dimitrov (fourth round)
11. (Latvia) Ernests Gulbis (first round)
12. (Spain) Feliciano López (fourth round)
13. (Spain) Roberto Bautista Agut (second round)
14. (South Africa) Kevin Anderson (fourth round)
15. (Spain) Tommy Robredo (first round, retired)
16. (Italy) Fabio Fognini (first round)

17. (France) Gaël Monfils (second round)
18. (France) Gilles Simon (third round)
19. (United States) John Isner (third round)
20. (Belgium) David Goffin (second round)
21. (Ukraine) Alexandr Dolgopolov (first round)
22. (Germany) Philipp Kohlschreiber (second round)
23. (Croatia) Ivo Karlović (second round)
24. (France) Richard Gasquet (third round)
25. (France) Julien Benneteau (first round)
26. (Argentina) Leonardo Mayer (second round)
27. (Uruguay) Pablo Cuevas (first round)
28. (Czech Republic) Lukáš Rosol (second round)
29. (France) Jérémy Chardy (second round)
30. (Colombia) Santiago Giraldo (second round)
31. (Spain) Fernando Verdasco (third round)
32. (Slovakia) Martin Kližan (second round, retired)

Click on the seed number of a player to go to their draw section.

== Draw ==
Key

- Q = Qualifier
- WC = Wild card
- LL = Lucky loser
- Alt = Alternate
- ITF = ITF entry
- PR = Protected ranking
- SR = Special ranking
- SE = Special exempt
- JE = Junior exempt
- JR = Junior Accelerator Programme entrant
- CO = College Accelerator Programme entrant
- NG = Next Gen Accelerator Program entrant
- w/o = Walkover
- r = Retired
- d = Defaulted

=== Finals ===
Quarterfinals
1	(Serbia) Novak Djokovic	7^{7}	6	6
8	(Canada) Milos Raonic	6^{5}	4	2
4	(Switzerland) Stan Wawrinka	6	6	7^{8}
5	(Japan) Kei Nishikori	3	4	6^{6}
7	(Czech Republic) Tomáš Berdych	6	6	7^{7}
3	(Spain) Rafael Nadal	2	0	6^{5}
6	(United Kingdom) Andy Murray	6	7^{7}	6
(Australia) Nick Kyrgios	3	6^{5}	3

Semifinals
1	(Serbia) Novak Djokovic	7^{7}	3	6	4	6
4	(Switzerland) Stan Wawrinka	6^{1}	6	4	6	0
7	(Czech Republic) Tomáš Berdych	7^{8}	0	3	5
6	(United Kingdom) Andy Murray	6^{6}	6	6	7

Final
1	(Serbia) Novak Djokovic	7^{7}	6^{4}	6	6
6	(United Kingdom) Andy Murray	6^{5}	7^{7}	3	0

=== Top half ===
==== Section 1 ====
First round
1	(Serbia) N Djokovic	6	6	6
Q	(Slovenia) A Bedene	3	2	4
(Russia) A Kuznetsov	6	3	6	7^{7}
(Spain) A Ramos Viñolas	1	6	3	6^{3}
(Japan) G Soeda	1	6	4	6	6
Q	(Sweden) E Ymer	6	4	6	3	3
(United Kingdom) J Ward	6	0	6^{6}	3
31	(Spain) F Verdasco	2	6	7^{8}	6
19	(United States) J Isner	7^{7}	6	6
Q	(Chinese Taipei) J Wang	6^{5}	4	4
Q	(France) L Lokoli	4	5	6	3
(Austria) A Haider-Maurer	6	7	4	6
(Spain) P Carreño Busta	4	6^{5}	6^{3}
(Luxembourg) G Müller	6	7^{7}	7^{7}
(Austria) D Thiem	6	2	3	6^{5}
13	(Spain) R Bautista Agut	4	6	6	7^{7}

Second round
1	(Serbia) N Djokovic	6	6	6
(Russia) A Kuznetsov	0	1	4
(Japan) G Soeda	3	2	6^{3}
31	(Spain) F Verdasco	6	6	7^{7}
19	(United States) J Isner	6	7^{7}	4	6
(Austria) A Haider-Maurer	4	6^{4}	6	4
(Luxembourg) G Müller	7^{7}	1	7	6
13	(Spain) R Bautista Agut	6^{5}	6	5	1

Third round
1	(Serbia) N Djokovic	7^{10}	6	6
31	(Spain) F Verdasco	6^{8}	3	4
19	(United States) J Isner	6^{4}	6^{6}	4
(Luxembourg) G Müller	7^{7}	7^{8}	6

Fourth round
1	(Serbia) N Djokovic	6	7	7
(Luxembourg) G Müller	4	5	5

==== Section 2 ====
First round
12	(Spain) F López	3	6	4	6	10
WC	(United States) D Kudla	6	2	6	2	8
(Slovenia) B Rola	6^{7}	3	2
(France) A Mannarino	7^{9}	6	6
LL	(Japan) H Moriya	6^{5}	6	3	5
(Poland) J Janowicz	7^{7}	2	6	7
WC	(France) L Pouille	7^{7}	6	4	1	4
17	(France) G Monfils	6^{3}	3	6	6	6
25	(France) J Benneteau	5	7	2	4
(Germany) B Becker	7	5	6	6
(Australia) L Hewitt	6	1	6	6
WC	(China) Z Zhang	3	6	0	4
(United States) D Young	6	4	6	6
Q	(Germany) T Pütz	4	6	3	2
Q	(Ukraine) I Marchenko	6^{3}	6^{3}	3
8	(Canada) M Raonic	7^{7}	7^{7}	6

Second round
12	(Spain) F López	4	4	7^{7}	4
(France) A Mannarino	6	6	6^{3}	0^{r}
(Poland) J Janowicz	6	1	6^{3}	6	6
17	(France) G Monfils	4	6	7^{7}	3	3
(Germany) B Becker	2	1	6	6	6
(Australia) L Hewitt	6	6	3	4	2
(United States) D Young	4	6^{3}	3
8	(Canada) M Raonic	6	7^{7}	6

Third round
12	(Spain) F López	7^{8}	6	7^{7}
(Poland) J Janowicz	6^{6}	4	6^{3}
(Germany) B Becker	4	3	3
8	(Canada) M Raonic	6	6	6

Fourth round
12	(Spain) F López	4	6	3	7^{9}	3
8	(Canada) M Raonic	6	4	6	6^{7}	6

==== Section 3 ====
First round
4	(Switzerland) S Wawrinka	6	6	6
(Turkey) M İlhan	1	4	2
Q	(Romania) M Copil	6	6	7
(Spain) P Andújar	2	2	5
(Finland) J Nieminen	6	6	7^{8}
(Kazakhstan) A Golubev	1	2	6^{6}
Q	(Germany) M Bachinger	7^{7}	6	6
27	(Uruguay) P Cuevas	6^{1}	3	1
21	(Ukraine) A Dolgopolov	4	3	2
(Italy) P Lorenzi	6	6	6
(United States) S Querrey	3	7^{7}	6	4	4
(Canada) V Pospisil	6	6^{5}	2	6	6
(Spain) G García López	6^{1}	7	6	1
(Germany) P Gojowczyk	7^{7}	5	4	0^{r}
(Colombia) A González	4	6	6	6
16	(Italy) F Fognini	6	2	3	4

Second round
4	(Switzerland) S Wawrinka	7^{7}	7^{7}	6
Q	(Romania) M Copil	6^{4}	6^{4}	3
(Finland) J Nieminen	7^{7}	7	7
Q	(Germany) M Bachinger	6^{4}	5	5
(Italy) P Lorenzi	7^{7}	6^{4}	3	4
(Canada) V Pospisil	6^{3}	7^{7}	6	6
(Spain) G García López	6	6	6
(Colombia) A González	1	3	3

Third round
4	(Switzerland) S Wawrinka	6	6	6
(Finland) J Nieminen	4	2	4
(Canada) V Pospisil	2	4	4
(Spain) G García López	6	6	6

Fourth round
4	(Switzerland) S Wawrinka	7^{7}	6	4	7^{10}
(Spain) G García López	6^{2}	4	6	6^{8}

==== Section 4 ====
First round
9	(Spain) D Ferrer	6^{2}	6	6	6
(Brazil) T Bellucci	7^{7}	2	0	3
(Ukraine) S Stakhovsky	6	4	6	6^{3}	6
(Serbia) D Lajović	3	6	4	7^{7}	4
(Spain) M Granollers	6	6	6
PR	(France) S Robert	3	4	4
(Netherlands) R Haase	1	3	4
18	(France) G Simon	6	6	6
30	(Colombia) S Giraldo	6	6	6
Q	(Czech Republic) J Hernych	3	2	2
Q	(United Kingdom) K Edmund	4	4	3
(United States) S Johnson	6	6	6
(Croatia) I Dodig	6	7	6
(Brazil) J Souza	4	5	4
(Spain) N Almagro	4	6^{1}	2
5	(Japan) K Nishikori	6	7^{7}	6

Second round
9	(Spain) D Ferrer	5	6	6	6
(Ukraine) S Stakhovsky	7	3	4	2
(Spain) M Granollers	6^{5}	2	4
18	(France) G Simon	7^{7}	6	6
30	(Colombia) S Giraldo	3	4	2
(United States) S Johnson	6	6	6
(Croatia) I Dodig	6	5	2	6^{0}
5	(Japan) K Nishikori	4	7	6	7^{7}

Third round
9	(Spain) D Ferrer	6	7	5	7^{7}
18	(France) G Simon	2	5	7	6^{4}
(United States) S Johnson	7^{9}	1	2	3
5	(Japan) K Nishikori	6^{7}	6	6	6

Fourth round
9	(Spain) D Ferrer	3	3	3
5	(Japan) K Nishikori	6	6	6

=== Bottom half ===
==== Section 5 ====
First round
7	(Czech Republic) T Berdych	6	7^{7}	6
(Colombia) A Falla	3	6^{1}	3
Q	(Austria) J Melzer	6	6	6
(Dominican Republic) V Estrella Burgos	1	4	2
(Czech Republic) J Veselý	3	6	2	3
(Serbia) V Troicki	6	3	6	6
WC	(Australia) J Millman	3	3	2
26	(Argentina) L Mayer	6	6	6
22	(Germany) P Kohlschreiber	6	6	6
(France) P-H Mathieu	2	2	1
(Germany) T Kamke	5	7^{7}	3	2
(Australia) B Tomic	7	6^{1}	6	6
(Australia) S Groth	6	7^{7}	6
(Serbia) F Krajinović	3	6^{4}	4
WC	(Australia) T Kokkinakis	5	6	1	7^{7}	8
11	(Latvia) E Gulbis	7	0	6	6^{2}	6

Second round
7	(Czech Republic) T Berdych	7^{7}	6	6
Q	(Austria) J Melzer	6^{0}	2	2
(Serbia) V Troicki	6	4	6	6
26	(Argentina) L Mayer	4	6	4	0
22	(Germany) P Kohlschreiber	7^{7}	4	6^{6}	6^{5}
(Australia) B Tomic	6^{5}	6	7^{8}	7^{7}
(Australia) S Groth	3	6	7	3	6
WC	(Australia) T Kokkinakis	6	3	5	6	1

Third round
7	(Czech Republic) T Berdych	6	6	6
(Serbia) V Troicki	4	3	4
(Australia) B Tomic	6	7^{10}	6
(Australia) S Groth	4	6^{8}	3

Fourth round
7	(Czech Republic) T Berdych	6	7^{7}	6
(Australia) B Tomic	2	6^{3}	2

==== Section 6 ====
First round
14	(South Africa) K Anderson	7^{7}	7	5	6
(Argentina) D Schwartzman	6^{5}	5	7	4
(Lithuania) R Berankis	2	6	7^{7}	6^{6}	6
(Netherlands) I Sijsling	6	4	6^{2}	7^{8}	4
(Slovenia) B Kavčič	2	7	6^{7}	6	2
WC	(Australia) J Duckworth	6	5	7^{9}	3	6
(Argentina) C Berlocq	1	3	1
24	(France) R Gasquet	6	6	6
28	(Czech Republic) L Rosol	4	6	6^{4}	6	6
(France) K de Schepper	6	2	7^{7}	3	4
(Germany) J-L Struff	4	6	6	3	5
(Israel) D Sela	6	4	3	6	7
WC	(Australia) L Saville	6^{2}	5	4
Q	(United States) T Smyczek	7^{7}	7	6
(Russia) M Youzhny	3	2	2
3	(Spain) R Nadal	6	6	6

Second round
14	(South Africa) K Anderson	6	6	7^{7}
(Lithuania) R Berankis	2	2	6^{2}
WC	(Australia) J Duckworth	2	3	5
24	(France) R Gasquet	6	6	7
28	(Czech Republic) L Rosol	6^{2}	7	5	3
(Israel) D Sela	7^{7}	5	7	6
Q	(United States) T Smyczek	2	6	7^{7}	3	5
3	(Spain) R Nadal	6	3	6^{2}	6	7

Third round
14	(South Africa) K Anderson	6	7^{7}	7^{8}
24	(France) R Gasquet	4	6^{3}	6^{6}
(Israel) D Sela	1	0	5
3	(Spain) R Nadal	6	6	7

Fourth round
14	(South Africa) K Anderson	5	1	4
3	(Spain) R Nadal	7	6	6

==== Section 7 ====
First round
6	(United Kingdom) A Murray	6	6	7^{7}
Q	(India) Y Bhambri	3	4	6^{3}
Q	(Russia) A Kudryavtsev	4	7^{7}	6	5	3
(Australia) M Matosevic	6	6^{5}	4	7	6
WC	(Australia) J Thompson	4	6^{5}	4
(Portugal) J Sousa	6	7^{7}	6
(Japan) T Ito	6^{6}	2	4
32	(Slovakia) M Kližan	7^{8}	6	6
20	(Belgium) D Goffin	6	6	5	6
Q	(United States) M Russell	3	3	7	0
(Cyprus) M Baghdatis	6	6^{5}	3	6	6
(Russia) T Gabashvili	2	7^{7}	6	4	4
(Argentina) M González	6	2	5	7^{7}	1
(Slovakia) L Lacko	4	6	7	6^{4}	6
(Germany) D Brown	2	3	2
10	(Bulgaria) G Dimitrov	6	6	6

Second round
6	(United Kingdom) A Murray	6	6	6
(Australia) M Matosevic	1	3	2
(Portugal) J Sousa	4	7^{7}	6	1
32	(Slovakia) M Kližan	6	6^{4}	4	0^{r}
20	(Belgium) D Goffin	1	4	6	0
(Cyprus) M Baghdatis	6	6	4	6
(Slovakia) L Lacko	3	7^{12}	3	3
10	(Bulgaria) G Dimitrov	6	6^{10}	6	6

Third round
6	(United Kingdom) A Murray	6	6	7
(Portugal) J Sousa	1	1	5
(Cyprus) M Baghdatis	6	3	6	3	3
10	(Bulgaria) G Dimitrov	4	6	3	6	6

Fourth round
6	(United Kingdom) A Murray	6	6^{5}	6	7
10	(Bulgaria) G Dimitrov	4	7^{7}	3	5

==== Section 8 ====
First round
15	(Spain) T Robredo	3^{r}
(France) É Roger-Vasselin	2
(Tunisia) M Jaziri	6	6	2	7^{7}
(Kazakhstan) M Kukushkin	2	3	6	6^{3}
(Argentina) F Delbonis	6^{2}	6	3	7^{7}	3
(Australia) N Kyrgios	7^{7}	3	6	6^{5}	6
Q	(Belgium) R Bemelmans	4	2	4
23	(Croatia) I Karlović	6	6	6
29	(France) J Chardy	3	6	7	6
(Croatia) B Ćorić	6	4	5	4
(Italy) A Seppi	5	6	2	6	6
(Uzbekistan) D Istomin	7	3	6	1	4
(Argentina) J Mónaco	3	6	3	1
(Italy) S Bolelli	6	3	6	6
(Chinese Taipei) Y-h Lu	4	2	5
2	(Switzerland) R Federer	6	6	7

Second round
(France) É Roger-Vasselin	6	3	4	6	3
(Tunisia) M Jaziri	1	6	6	1	6
(Australia) N Kyrgios	7^{7}	6	5	6
23	(Croatia) I Karlović	6^{4}	4	7	4
29	(France) J Chardy	5	6	2	1
(Italy) A Seppi	7	3	6	6
(Italy) S Bolelli	6	3	2	2
2	(Switzerland) R Federer	3	6	6	6

Third round
(Tunisia) M Jaziri	3	6^{6}	1
(Australia) N Kyrgios	6	7^{8}	6
(Italy) A Seppi	6	7^{7}	4	7^{7}
2	(Switzerland) R Federer	4	6^{5}	6	6^{5}

Fourth round
(Australia) N Kyrgios	5	4	6	7^{7}	8
(Italy) A Seppi	7	6	3	6^{5}	6

== Notes ==
- (Spain) Tommy Robredo, the 15th seed, retired in the first set of his first-round match against Frenchman Édouard Roger-Vasselin with a leg injury.
- (Germany) Peter Gojowczyk retired in the fourth set of his first-round match against Spaniard Guillermo García López with an ankle injury.
- (Slovakia) Martin Kližan, the 32nd seed, retired in the fourth set of his second-round match against Portugal's João Sousa.
- (France) Adrian Mannarino retired in the fourth set of his second-round match against Spaniard Feliciano López due to heat exhaustion.

Preceded by 2014 US Open – Men's singles	Grand Slam men's singles	Succeeded by 2015 French Open – Men's singles
