= 2015 Australian Open – Wheelchair women's doubles =

Wheelchair women's doubles hotwheels

Wheelchair women's doubles
- 2015 Australian Open

Final
- Champions: (Japan) Yui Kamiji (United Kingdom) Jordanne Whiley
- Runners-up: (Netherlands) Jiske Griffioen (Netherlands) Aniek van Koot
- Score: 4–6, 6–4, 7–5

Events
Singles	men	women		boys	girls
Doubles	men	women	mixed	boys	girls
WC Singles	men	women	quad
WC Doubles	men	women	quad
Legends	men	women	mixed
← 2014 ·	Australian Open	· 2016 →

Defending champions Yui Kamiji and Jordanne Whiley defeated Jiske Griffioen and Aniek van Koot in the final, 4–6, 6–4, 7–5 to win the women's doubles wheelchair tennis title at the 2015 Australian Open.

== Seeds ==
1. (Japan) Yui Kamiji / (United Kingdom) Jordanne Whiley (champions)
2. (Netherlands) Jiske Griffioen / (Netherlands) Aniek van Koot (final)

== Draw ==
=== Key ===
- Q = Qualifier
- WC = Wild card
- LL = Lucky loser
- Alt = Alternate
- ITF = ITF entry
- PR = Protected ranking
- SR = Special ranking
- SE = Special exempt
- JE = Junior exempt
- JR = Junior Accelerator Programme entrant
- CO = College Accelerator Programme entrant
- NG = Next Gen Accelerator Program entrant
- w/o = Walkover
- r = Retired
- d = Defaulted

Semifinals
1	(Japan) Yui Kamiji (United Kingdom) Jordanne Whiley	6	6
(Netherlands) Sharon Walraven (Germany) Katharina Krüger	4	3
(Netherlands) Marjolein Buis (Germany) Sabine Ellerbrock	4	2
2	(Netherlands) Jiske Griffioen (Netherlands) Aniek van Koot	6	6

Final
1	(Japan) Yui Kamiji (United Kingdom) Jordanne Whiley	4	6	7
2	(Netherlands) Jiske Griffioen (Netherlands) Aniek van Koot	6	4	5
