= 2015 Australian Open – Wheelchair women's singles =

Wheelchair women's singles
- 2015 Australian Open

Final
- Champion: (Netherlands) Jiske Griffioen
- Runner-up: (Japan) Yui Kamiji
- Score: 6–3, 7–5

Events
Singles	men	women		boys	girls
Doubles	men	women	mixed	boys	girls
WC Singles	men	women	quad
WC Doubles	men	women	quad
Legends	men	women	mixed
← 2014 ·	Australian Open	· 2016 →

Jiske Griffioen defeated Yui Kamiji in the final, 6–3, 7–5 to win the women's singles wheelchair tennis title at the 2015 Australian Open.

Sabine Ellerbrock was the defending champion, but was defeated by Kamiji in the semifinals.

== Seeds ==
1. (Japan) Yui Kamiji (final)
2. (Netherlands) Aniek van Koot (semifinals)

== Draw ==
=== Key ===
- Q = Qualifier
- WC = Wild card
- LL = Lucky loser
- Alt = Alternate
- ITF = ITF entry
- PR = Protected ranking
- SR = Special ranking
- SE = Special exempt
- JE = Junior exempt
- JR = Junior Accelerator Programme entrant
- CO = College Accelerator Programme entrant
- NG = Next Gen Accelerator Program entrant
- w/o = Walkover
- r = Retired
- d = Defaulted

Quarterfinals
1	(Japan) Yui Kamiji	6	6
(Netherlands) Sharon Walraven	3	1
WC	(Germany) Katharina Krüger	2	1
(Germany) Sabine Ellerbrock	6	6
(Netherlands) Marjolein Buis	3	6	3
(Netherlands) Jiske Griffioen	6	4	6
(United Kingdom) Jordanne Whiley	2	0
2	(Netherlands) Aniek van Koot	6	6

Semifinals
1	(Japan) Yui Kamiji	6	6
(Germany) Sabine Ellerbrock	2	1
(Netherlands) Jiske Griffioen	6	6
2	(Netherlands) Aniek van Koot	4	4

Final
1	(Japan) Yui Kamiji	3	5
(Netherlands) Jiske Griffioen	6	7
