= 2015 Australian Open – Wheelchair quad doubles =

Wheelchair quad doubles
- 2015 Australian Open

Final
- Champions: (United Kingdom) Andrew Lapthorne (United States) David Wagner
- Runners-up: (Australia) Dylan Alcott (South Africa) Lucas Sithole
- Score: 6–0, 3–6, 6–2

Events
Singles	men	women		boys	girls
Doubles	men	women	mixed	boys	girls
WC Singles	men	women	quad
WC Doubles	men	women	quad
Legends	men	women	mixed
- Australian Open

Defending champions Andrew Lapthorne and David Wagner defeated Dylan Alcott and Lucas Sithole in the final, 6–0, 3–6, 6–2 to win the quad doubles wheelchair tennis title at the 2015 Australian Open.

== Seeds ==
1. (United Kingdom) Andrew Lapthorne / (United States) David Wagner (champions)
2. (Australia) Dylan Alcott / (South Africa) Lucas Sithole (final)

== Draw ==
Key

- Q = Qualifier
- WC = Wild card
- LL = Lucky loser
- Alt = Alternate
- ITF = ITF entry
- PR = Protected ranking
- SR = Special ranking
- SE = Special exempt
- JE = Junior exempt
- JR = Junior Accelerator Programme entrant
- CO = College Accelerator Programme entrant
- NG = Next Gen Accelerator Program entrant
- w/o = Walkover
- r = Retired
- d = Defaulted

Final
1	(United Kingdom) Andrew Lapthorne (United States) David Wagner	6	3	6
2	(Australia) Dylan Alcott (South Africa) Lucas Sithole	0	6	2
