= 2015 Australian Open – Men's doubles =

Tennis tournament

Men's doubles
- 2015 Australian Open

Final
- Champions: (Italy) Simone Bolelli (Italy) Fabio Fognini
- Runners-up: (France) Pierre-Hugues Herbert (France) Nicolas Mahut
- Score: 6–4, 6–4

Details
- Draw: 64
- Seeds: 16

Events
Singles	men	women		boys	girls
Doubles	men	women	mixed	boys	girls
WC Singles	men	women	quad
WC Doubles	men	women	quad
Legends	men	women	mixed
- Australian Open

Simone Bolelli and Fabio Fognini defeated Pierre-Hugues Herbert and Nicolas Mahut in the final, 6–4, 6–4, to win the men's doubles tennis title at the 2015 Australian Open. Bolelli and Fognini's victory earned them their first Grand Slam doubles title and their third title overall as a pair. They became the first all-Italian team to win a Grand Slam since Nicola Pietrangeli and Orlando Sirola at the 1959 French Open.

Łukasz Kubot and Robert Lindstedt were the defending champions, but chose not to participate together. Kubot teamed up with Jérémy Chardy, but lost in the second round to Alex Bolt and Andrew Whittington. Lindstedt played alongside Marcin Matkowski, but lost in the second round to Jonathan Erlich and Treat Huey.

== Seeds ==
1. (United States) Bob Bryan / (United States) Mike Bryan (third round)
2. (France) Julien Benneteau / (France) Édouard Roger-Vasselin (quarterfinals)
3. (Spain) Marcel Granollers / (Spain) Marc López (first round)
4. (Croatia) Ivan Dodig / (Brazil) Marcelo Melo (semifinals)
5. (Austria) Alexander Peya / (Brazil) Bruno Soares (second round)
6. (Netherlands) Jean-Julien Rojer / (Romania) Horia Tecău (semifinals)
7. (India) Rohan Bopanna / (Canada) Daniel Nestor (second round)
8. (Pakistan) Aisam-ul-Haq Qureshi / (Serbia) Nenad Zimonjić (third round)

9. (Sweden) Robert Lindstedt / (Poland) Marcin Matkowski (second round)
10. (South Africa) Raven Klaasen / (India) Leander Paes (second round)
11. (Colombia) Juan Sebastián Cabal / (Colombia) Robert Farah (second round)
12. (United States) Eric Butorac / (Australia) Sam Groth (third round)
13. (Austria) Julian Knowle / (Canada) Vasek Pospisil (second round, retired)
14. (United Kingdom) Dominic Inglot / (Romania) Florin Mergea (quarterfinals)
15. (Croatia) Marin Draganja / (Finland) Henri Kontinen (first round)
16. (United Kingdom) Jamie Murray / (Australia) John Peers (third round)

== Draw ==
Key

- Q = Qualifier
- WC = Wild card
- LL = Lucky loser
- Alt = Alternate
- ITF = ITF entry
- PR = Protected ranking
- SR = Special ranking
- SE = Special exempt
- JE = Junior exempt
- JR = Junior Accelerator Programme entrant
- CO = College Accelerator Programme entrant
- NG = Next Gen Accelerator Program entrant
- w/o = Walkover
- r = Retired
- d = Defaulted

=== Finals ===
Quarterfinals
14	(United Kingdom) Dominic Inglot (Romania) Florin Mergea	4	6^{3}
6	(Netherlands) Jean-Julien Rojer (Romania) Horia Tecău	6	7^{7}
(Uruguay) Pablo Cuevas (Spain) David Marrero	6^{5}	6^{5}
(Italy) Simone Bolelli (Italy) Fabio Fognini	7^{7}	7^{7}
(Spain) Feliciano López (Belarus) Max Mirnyi	0	6	6^{4}
4	(Croatia) Ivan Dodig (Brazil) Marcelo Melo	6	3	7^{7}
(France) Pierre-Hugues Herbert (France) Nicolas Mahut	7^{7}	3	6
2	(France) Julien Benneteau (France) Édouard Roger-Vasselin	6^{5}	6	3

Semifinals
6	(Netherlands) Jean-Julien Rojer (Romania) Horia Tecău	4	6	3
(Italy) Simone Bolelli (Italy) Fabio Fognini	6	3	6
4	(Croatia) Ivan Dodig (Brazil) Marcelo Melo	4	7^{7}	6^{5}
(France) Pierre-Hugues Herbert (France) Nicolas Mahut	6	6^{5}	7^{7}

Final
(Italy) Simone Bolelli (Italy) Fabio Fognini	6	6
(France) Pierre-Hugues Herbert (France) Nicolas Mahut	4	4

=== Top half ===
==== Section 1 ====
First round
1	(United States) B Bryan (United States) M Bryan	6	7
WC	(Australia) J Millman (Australia) B Mitchell	3	5
(Argentina) C Berlocq (Argentina) L Mayer	6	6
(Sweden) J Brunström (United States) N Monroe	4	4
(Argentina) D Schwartzman (Argentina) H Zeballos	6	6
PR	(India) M Bhupathi (Austria) J Melzer	4	3
WC	(Australia) M Ebden (Australia) M Reid	2	2
14	(United Kingdom) D Inglot (Romania) F Mergea	6	6
12	(United States) E Butorac (Australia) S Groth	6	7^{7}
(Italy) P Lorenzi (Italy) A Seppi	3	6^{5}
(Croatia) I Karlović (Finland) J Nieminen	4	6	6^{5}
(Spain) P Andújar (Germany) D Brown	6	3	7^{7}
(Australia) C Guccione (Australia) L Hewitt	6	6
(Argentina) F Delbonis (Spain) A Ramos-Viñolas	3	3
(Lithuania) R Berankis (Austria) A Haider-Maurer	4	2
6	(Netherlands) J-J Rojer (Romania) H Tecău	6	6

Second round
1	(United States) B Bryan (United States) M Bryan	5	6	6
(Argentina) C Berlocq (Argentina) L Mayer	7	3	1
(Argentina) D Schwartzman (Argentina) H Zeballos	6^{6}	6	2
14	(United Kingdom) D Inglot (Romania) F Mergea	7^{8}	4	6
12	(United States) E Butorac (Australia) S Groth	7^{7}	6
(Spain) P Andújar (Germany) D Brown	6^{1}	4
(Australia) C Guccione (Australia) L Hewitt	4	2
6	(Netherlands) J-J Rojer (Romania) H Tecău	6	6

Third round
1	(United States) B Bryan (United States) M Bryan	6^{4}	3
14	(United Kingdom) D Inglot (Romania) F Mergea	7^{7}	6
12	(United States) E Butorac (Australia) S Groth	6	5	6^{5}
6	(Netherlands) J-J Rojer (Romania) H Tecău	3	7	7^{7}

Quarterfinals
14	(United Kingdom) D Inglot (Romania) F Mergea	4	6^{3}
6	(Netherlands) J-J Rojer (Romania) H Tecău	6	7^{7}

==== Section 2 ====
First round
3	(Spain) M Granollers (Spain) M López	6^{6}	6	5
(United States) A Krajicek (United States) D Young	7^{8}	2	7
(United Kingdom) J Marray (Ukraine) S Stakhovsky	4	6^{6}
(Uruguay) P Cuevas (Spain) D Marrero	6	7^{8}
(France) J Chardy (Poland) Ł Kubot	6	6
(Italy) D Bracciali (Netherlands) J Huta Galung	3	4
WC	(Australia) A Bolt (Australia) A Whittington	7^{7}	7^{7}
15	(Croatia) M Draganja (Finland) H Kontinen	6^{4}	6^{4}
10	(South Africa) R Klaasen (India) L Paes	6	7^{8}
(United States) S Lipsky (United States) R Ram	4	6^{6}
(United States) S Johnson (United States) S Querrey	7	4	3
(Italy) S Bolelli (Italy) F Fognini	5	6	6
(Austria) O Marach (New Zealand) M Venus	6	7^{7}
(Germany) P Gojowczyk (Czech Republic) L Rosol	3	6^{4}
(Serbia) V Troicki (Russia) M Youzhny	1	4
5	(Austria) A Peya (Brazil) B Soares	6	6

Second round
(United States) A Krajicek (United States) D Young	2	2
(Uruguay) P Cuevas (Spain) D Marrero	6	6
(France) J Chardy (Poland) Ł Kubot	6	5	5
WC	(Australia) A Bolt (Australia) A Whittington	2	7	7
10	(South Africa) R Klaasen (India) L Paes	6	4	1
(Italy) S Bolelli (Italy) F Fognini	2	6	6
(Austria) O Marach (New Zealand) M Venus	6	7^{7}
5	(Austria) A Peya (Brazil) B Soares	4	6^{5}

Third round
(Uruguay) P Cuevas (Spain) D Marrero	7^{9}	7^{7}
WC	(Australia) A Bolt (Australia) A Whittington	6^{7}	6^{3}
(Italy) S Bolelli (Italy) F Fognini	6	6
(Austria) O Marach (New Zealand) M Venus	4	2

Quarterfinals
(Uruguay) P Cuevas (Spain) D Marrero	6^{5}	6^{5}
(Italy) S Bolelli (Italy) F Fognini	7^{7}	7^{7}

=== Bottom half ===
==== Section 3 ====
First round
7	(India) R Bopanna (Canada) D Nestor	7^{7}	7
(Cyprus) M Baghdatis (Australia) M Matosevic	6^{2}	5
WC	(Australia) J Duckworth (Australia) L Saville	6^{1}	7^{7}	2
(Spain) F López (Belarus) M Mirnyi	7^{7}	6^{5}	6
(Serbia) D Lajović (Chinese Taipei) Y-h Lu	3	7^{7}	3
(Israel) J Erlich (Philippines) T Huey	6	6^{3}	6
(Tunisia) M Jaziri (Canada) A Shamasdin	4	4
9	(Sweden) R Lindstedt (Poland) M Matkowski	6	6
16	(United Kingdom) J Murray (Australia) J Peers	6	6^{4}	6
(Argentina) M González (Argentina) J Mónaco	1	7^{7}	4
WC	(Australia) O Jasika (Australia) J-P Smith	6	2	6
(Australia) R Junaid (France) A Mannarino	2	6	3
(Kazakhstan) A Golubev (Uzbekistan) D Istomin	6	2	6
WC	(Australia) T Kokkinakis (Australia) N Kyrgios	3	6	2
(Germany) A Begemann (Netherlands) R Haase	6^{2}	2
4	(Croatia) I Dodig (Brazil) M Melo	7^{7}	6

Second round
7	(India) R Bopanna (Canada) D Nestor	5	3
(Spain) F López (Belarus) M Mirnyi	7	6
(Israel) J Erlich (Philippines) T Huey	6	6
9	(Sweden) R Lindstedt (Poland) M Matkowski	3	2
16	(United Kingdom) J Murray (Australia) J Peers	6	6
WC	(Australia) O Jasika (Australia) J-P Smith	2	3
(Kazakhstan) A Golubev (Uzbekistan) D Istomin	2	6	6^{3}
4	(Croatia) I Dodig (Brazil) M Melo	6	3	7^{7}

Third round
(Spain) F López (Belarus) M Mirnyi	7	6
(Israel) J Erlich (Philippines) T Huey	5	3
16	(United Kingdom) J Murray (Australia) J Peers	7^{10}	2	4
4	(Croatia) I Dodig (Brazil) M Melo	6^{8}	6	6

Quarterfinals
(Spain) F López (Belarus) M Mirnyi	0	6	6^{4}
4	(Croatia) I Dodig (Brazil) M Melo	6	3	7^{7}

==== Section 4 ====
First round
8	(Pakistan) A-u-H Qureshi (Serbia) N Zimonjić	6^{7}	6	6
(Russia) T Gabashvili (Kazakhstan) M Kukushkin	7^{9}	4	3
(Spain) P Carreño Busta (Spain) G García-López	6	6
(Czech Republic) F Čermák (Czech Republic) J Veselý	3	2
(Slovakia) M Kližan (Austria) P Oswald	6^{6}	6^{2}
(France) P-H Herbert (France) N Mahut	7^{8}	7^{7}
(Croatia) M Pavić (Brazil) A Sá	6	3	2
11	(Colombia) JS Cabal (Colombia) R Farah	3	6	6
13	(Austria) J Knowle (Canada) V Pospisil	7^{7}	3	7^{7}
(Germany) J-L Struff (Austria) D Thiem	6^{3}	6	6^{4}
(Germany) B Becker (New Zealand) A Sitak	6	6
(Luxembourg) G Müller (Netherlands) I Sijsling	3	4
(Colombia) S Giraldo (Portugal) J Sousa	6	6
(Poland) M Fyrstenberg (Mexico) S González	4	4
WC	(Chinese Taipei) H-h Lee (China) Z Zhang	1	4
2	(France) J Benneteau (France) É Roger-Vasselin	6	6

Second round
8	(Pakistan) A-u-H Qureshi (Serbia) N Zimonjić	7^{11}	6
(Spain) P Carreño Busta (Spain) G García-López	6^{9}	4
(France) P-H Herbert (France) N Mahut	6	6
11	(Colombia) JS Cabal (Colombia) R Farah	3	4
13	(Austria) J Knowle (Canada) V Pospisil	2^{r}
(Germany) B Becker (New Zealand) A Sitak	1
(Colombia) S Giraldo (Portugal) J Sousa	5	4
2	(France) J Benneteau (France) É Roger-Vasselin	7	6

Third round
8	(Pakistan) A-u-H Qureshi (Serbia) N Zimonjić	3	3
(France) P-H Herbert (France) N Mahut	6	6
(Germany) B Becker (New Zealand) A Sitak	2	4
2	(France) J Benneteau (France) É Roger-Vasselin	6	6

Quarterfinals
(France) P-H Herbert (France) N Mahut	7^{7}	3	6
2	(France) J Benneteau (France) É Roger-Vasselin	6^{5}	6	3
