= 2015 Australian Open – Wheelchair men's singles =

Wheelchair men's singles
- 2015 Australian Open

Final
- Champion: (Japan) Shingo Kunieda
- Runner-up: (France) Stéphane Houdet
- Score: 6–2, 6–2

Events
| Singles | men | women | | boys | girls |
| Doubles | men | women | mixed | boys | girls |
| WC Singles | men | women | quad |
| WC Doubles | men | women | quad |
| Legends | men | women | mixed |
- Australian Open

Two-time defending champion Shingo Kunieda defeated Stéphane Houdet in the final, 6–2, 6–2, to win the men's singles wheelchair tennis title at the 2015 Australian Open. It was his eighth Australian Open title and 18th major singles title overall.

Houdet was bidding to win his first Australian Open title at his fourth final, having lost to Kunieda on all three previous occasions.

== Seeds ==
1. (Japan) Shingo Kunieda (champion)
2. (France) Stéphane Houdet (final)

== Draw ==
Key

- Q = Qualifier
- WC = Wild card
- LL = Lucky loser
- Alt = Alternate
- ITF = ITF entry
- PR = Protected ranking
- SR = Special ranking
- SE = Special exempt
- JE = Junior exempt
- JR = Junior Accelerator Programme entrant
- CO = College Accelerator Programme entrant
- NG = Next Gen Accelerator Program entrant
- w/o = Walkover
- r = Retired
- d = Defaulted

Quarterfinals
1 | (Japan) Shingo Kunieda | 6 | 6
(Netherlands) Maikel Scheffers | 2 | 3
(Argentina) Gustavo Fernández | 6 | 6
(United Kingdom) Gordon Reid | 2 | 4
(France) Nicolas Peifer | 5 | 1
(Belgium) Joachim Gérard | 7 | 6
WC | (Australia) Adam Kellerman | 2 | 2
2 | (France) Stéphane Houdet | 6 | 6

Semifinals
1 | (Japan) Shingo Kunieda | 6^{5} | 6 | 6
(Argentina) Gustavo Fernández | 7^{7} | 1 | 2
(Belgium) Joachim Gérard | 6 | 2 | 3
2 | (France) Stéphane Houdet | 3 | 6 | 6

Final
1 | (Japan) Shingo Kunieda | 6 | 6
2 | (France) Stéphane Houdet | 2 | 2
