= 2015 Australian Open – Wheelchair men's doubles =

Wheelchair men's doubles
- 2015 Australian Open

Final
- Champions: (France) Stéphane Houdet (Japan) Shingo Kunieda
- Runners-up: (Argentina) Gustavo Fernández (United Kingdom) Gordon Reid
- Score: 6–2, 6–1

Events
Singles	men	women		boys	girls
Doubles	men	women	mixed	boys	girls
WC Singles	men	women	quad
WC Doubles	men	women	quad
Legends	men	women	mixed
← 2014 ·	Australian Open	· 2016 →

Defending champions Stéphane Houdet and Shingo Kunieda defeated Gustavo Fernández and Gordon Reid in the final, 6–2, 6–1 to win the men's doubles wheelchair tennis title at the 2015 Australian Open.

== Seeds ==
1. (France) Stéphane Houdet / (Japan) Shingo Kunieda (champions)
2. (Belgium) Joachim Gérard / (Netherlands) Maikel Scheffers (semifinals)

== Draw ==
=== Key ===
- Q = Qualifier
- WC = Wild card
- LL = Lucky loser
- Alt = Alternate
- ITF = ITF entry
- PR = Protected ranking
- SR = Special ranking
- SE = Special exempt
- JE = Junior exempt
- JR = Junior Accelerator Programme entrant
- CO = College Accelerator Programme entrant
- NG = Next Gen Accelerator Program entrant
- w/o = Walkover
- r = Retired
- d = Defaulted

Semifinals
1	(France) Stéphane Houdet (Japan) Shingo Kunieda	6	6
(Australia) Adam Kellerman (France) Nicolas Peifer	1	0
(Argentina) Gustavo Fernández (United Kingdom) Gordon Reid	6	7
2	(Belgium) Joachim Gérard (Netherlands) Maikel Scheffers	1	5

Final
1	(France) Stéphane Houdet (Japan) Shingo Kunieda	6	6
(Argentina) Gustavo Fernández (United Kingdom) Gordon Reid	2	1
