= 2015 Australian Open – Wheelchair quad singles =

Wheelchair quad singles
- 2015 Australian Open

Final
- Champion: (Australia) Dylan Alcott
- Runner-up: (United States) David Wagner
- Score: 6–2, 6–3

Events
Singles	men	women		boys	girls
Doubles	men	women	mixed	boys	girls
WC Singles	men	women	quad
WC Doubles	men	women	quad
Legends	men	women	mixed
- Australian Open

Dylan Alcott defeated the two-time defending champion David Wagner in the final, 6–2, 6–3 to win the quad singles wheelchair tennis title at the 2015 Australian Open.

== Seeds ==
1. (United States) David Wagner (final)
2. (Australia) Dylan Alcott (champion)

== Draw ==
Key

- Q = Qualifier
- WC = Wild card
- LL = Lucky loser
- Alt = Alternate
- ITF = ITF entry
- PR = Protected ranking
- SR = Special ranking
- SE = Special exempt
- JE = Junior exempt
- JR = Junior Accelerator Programme entrant
- CO = College Accelerator Programme entrant
- NG = Next Gen Accelerator Program entrant
- w/o = Walkover
- r = Retired
- d = Defaulted

=== Final ===
Final
2	(Australia) Dylan Alcott	6	6
1	(United States) David Wagner	2	3

=== Round robin ===
		(United States) Wagner	(Australia) Alcott	(United Kingdom) Lapthorne	(South Africa) Sithole	RR; W–L	Set; W–L	Game; W–L	Standings
1	(United States) David Wagner		4–6, 4–6	3–6, 5-7	6–3, 6–1	1–2	2–4	28–29	2
2	(Australia) Dylan Alcott	6–4, 6–4		6–4, 6–4	6–1, 6–1	3–0	6–0	36–18	1
	(United Kingdom) Andrew Lapthorne	6–3, 7–5	4–6, 4–6		3–6, 6–7^{(4–7)}	1–2	2–4	30–33	3
WC	(South Africa) Lucas Sithole	3–6, 1–6	1–6, 1–6	6–3, 7–6^{(7–4)}		1–2	2–4	19–33	4

Standings are determined by: 1. number of wins; 2. number of matches; 3. in two-players-ties, head-to-head records; 4. in three-players-ties, percentage of sets won, or of games won; 5. steering-committee decision.
