= 2015 Australian Open – Men's legends' doubles =

Men's legends' doubles
- 2015 Australian Open

Final
- Champion: (Sweden) Jonas Björkman (Sweden) Thomas Johansson
- Runner-up: (Sweden) Thomas Enqvist (Sweden) Mats Wilander
- Score: 3^{4}-4^{6}, 4-2, 4-2, 4-2

Events
Singles	men	women		boys	girls
Doubles	men	women	mixed	boys	girls
WC Singles	men	women	quad
WC Doubles	men	women	quad
Legends	men	women	mixed
← 2014 ·	Australian Open	· 2016 →

Jonas Björkman and Thomas Johansson won the title emerging victorious over their compatriots Thomas Enqvist and Mats Wilander in the final in four sets.

== Draw ==
=== Key ===
- Q = Qualifier
- WC = Wild card
- LL = Lucky loser
- Alt = Alternate
- ITF = ITF entry
- PR = Protected ranking
- SR = Special ranking
- SE = Special exempt
- JE = Junior exempt
- JR = Junior Accelerator Programme entrant
- CO = College Accelerator Programme entrant
- NG = Next Gen Accelerator Program entrant
- w/o = Walkover
- r = Retired
- d = Defaulted

=== Finals ===
Final
1	(Sweden) Jonas Björkman (Sweden) Thomas Johansson	3^{4}	4	4	4
2	(Sweden) Thomas Enqvist (Sweden) Mats Wilander	4^{6}	2	2	2

=== Group A ===
	(Australia) Woodbridge (Australia) Woodforde	(France) Leconte (Australia) Philippoussis	(Sweden) Björkman (Sweden) Johansson	(United States) Chang (South Africa) Ferreira	RR W–L	Set W–L	Game W–L	Standings
(Australia) Todd Woodbridge (Australia) Mark Woodforde		2-4, 3-4^{(3-5)}	3-4^{(2-5)}, 1-4, 4-3^{(6-4)}, 3-4^{(0-5)}	4-2, 4-3^{(4-2)}, 4-3^{(4-2)}	1–2	4–5	28–31	3
(France) Henri Leconte (Australia) Mark Philippoussis	4-2, 4-3^{(5-3)}		2-4, 4-1, 3-4^{(1-5)}, 3-4^{(3-5)}	4-3^{(5-3)}, 4-3^{(5-3)}, 4-3^{(5-3)}	2–1	6–3	32–27	2
(Sweden) Jonas Björkman (Sweden) Thomas Johansson	4-3^{(5-2)}, 4-1, 3-4^{(4-6)}, 4-3^{(5-0)}	4-2, 1-4, 4-3^{(5-1)}, 4-3^{(5-3)}		3-4^{(3-5)}, 4-2, 3-4^{(4-6)}, 4-2, 4-3^{(5-2)}	3–0	9–4	46–38	1
(United States) Michael Chang (South Africa) Wayne Ferreira	2-4, 3-4^{(2-4)}, 3-4^{(2-4)}	3-4^{(3-5)}, 3-4^{(3-5)}, 3-4^{(3-5)}	4-3^{(5-3)}, 2-4, 4-3^{(6-4)}, 2-4, 3-4^{(2-5)}		0–3	2–9	32–42	4

Standings are determined by: 1. number of wins; 2. number of matches; 3. in two-players-ties, head-to-head records; 4. in three-players-ties, percentage of sets won, or of games won; 5. steering-committee decision.

=== Group B ===
	(Croatia) Ivanišević (United States) Gimelstob	(Iran) Bahrami (France) Santoro	(Australia) Arthurs (Australia) Cash	(Sweden) Enqvist (Sweden) Wilander	RR W–L	Set W–L	Game W–L	Standings
(Croatia) Goran Ivanišević (United States) Justin Gimelstob		3-4^{(4-6)}, 0-4, 4-3^{(5-3)}, 0-4	1-4, 3-4^{(3-5)}, 4-1, 2-4	3-4^{(4-6)}, 3-4^{(4-6)}, 4-2, 3-4^{(3-5)}	0–3	3–9	30–42	4
(Iran) Mansour Bahrami (France) Fabrice Santoro	4-3^{(6-4)}, 4-0, 3-4^{(3-5)}, 4-0		3-4^{(2-4)}, 4-2, 3-4^{(4-6)}, 3-4^{(4-6)}	3-4^{(3-5)}, 4-1, [4-10]	1–2	5–6	35–27	3
(Australia) Wayne Arthurs (Australia) Pat Cash	4-1, 4-3^{(5-3)}, 1-4, 4-2	4-3^{(4-2)}, 2-4, 4-3^{(6-4)}, 4-3^{(6-4)}		3-4^{(3-5)}, 4-2, 3-4^{(2-5)}, 4-2, 3-4^{(3-5)}	2–1	8–5	44–39	2
(Sweden) Thomas Enqvist (Sweden) Mats Wilander	4-3^{(6-4)}, 4-3^{(6-4)}, 2-4, 4-3^{(5-3)}	4-3^{(5-3)}, 1-4, [10-4]	4-3^{(5-3)}, 2-4, 4-3^{(5-2)}, 2-4, 4-3^{(5-3)}		3–0	8–5	36–37	1

Standings are determined by: 1. number of wins; 2. number of matches; 3. in two-players-ties, head-to-head records; 4. in three-players-ties, percentage of sets won, or of games won; 5. steering-committee decision.
