= 2015 Australian Open – Women's singles =

Women's singles
- 2015 Australian Open

Final
- Champion: (United States) Serena Williams
- Runner-up: (Russia) Maria Sharapova
- Score: 6–3, 7–6^{(7–5)}

Details
- Draw: 128 (12Q / 8WC)
- Seeds: 32

Events
Singles	men	women		boys	girls
Doubles	men	women	mixed	boys	girls
WC Singles	men	women	quad
WC Doubles	men	women	quad
Legends	men	women	mixed
- Australian Open

Serena Williams defeated Maria Sharapova in the final, 6–3, 7–6^{(7–5)} to win the women's singles tennis title at the 2015 Australian Open. It was her sixth Australian Open singles title and her 19th major singles title overall. Sharapova reached the final after saving two match points in the second round against Alexandra Panova. The final was a rematch of the 2007 final.

Li Na was the reigning champion, but she retired from professional tennis in September 2014.

All of the top four seeds (Williams, Sharapova, Simona Halep, and Petra Kvitová) were in contention for the world No. 1 ranking. Williams retained the top position by reaching the final.

== Seeds ==
1. (United States) Serena Williams (champion)
2. (Russia) Maria Sharapova (final)
3. (Romania) Simona Halep (quarterfinals)
4. (Czech Republic) Petra Kvitová (third round)
5. (Serbia) Ana Ivanovic (first round)
6. (Poland) Agnieszka Radwańska (fourth round)
7. (Canada) Eugenie Bouchard (quarterfinals)
8. (Denmark) Caroline Wozniacki (second round)
9. (Germany) Angelique Kerber (first round)
10. (Russia) Ekaterina Makarova (semifinals)
11. (Slovakia) Dominika Cibulková (quarterfinals)
12. (Italy) Flavia Pennetta (first round)
13. (Germany) Andrea Petkovic (first round)
14. (Italy) Sara Errani (third round)
15. (Serbia) Jelena Janković (first round)
16. (Czech Republic) Lucie Šafářová (first round)

17. (Spain) Carla Suárez Navarro (first round)
18. (United States) Venus Williams (quarterfinals)
19. (France) Alizé Cornet (third round)
20. (Australia) Samantha Stosur (second round)
21. (China) Peng Shuai (fourth round)
22. (Czech Republic) Karolína Plíšková (third round)
23. (Russia) Anastasia Pavlyuchenkova (first round)
24. (Spain) Garbiñe Muguruza (fourth round)
25. (Czech Republic) Barbora Záhlavová-Strýcová (third round)
26. (Ukraine) Elina Svitolina (third round)
27. (Russia) Svetlana Kuznetsova (first round)
28. (Germany) Sabine Lisicki (first round)
29. (Australia) Casey Dellacqua (second round)
30. (United States) Varvara Lepchenko (third round)
31. (Kazakhstan) Zarina Diyas (third round)
32. (Switzerland) Belinda Bencic (first round)

== Draw ==
Key

- Q = Qualifier
- WC = Wild card
- LL = Lucky loser
- Alt = Alternate
- ITF = ITF entry
- PR = Protected ranking
- SR = Special ranking
- SE = Special exempt
- JE = Junior exempt
- JR = Junior Accelerator Programme entrant
- CO = College Accelerator Programme entrant
- NG = Next Gen Accelerator Program entrant
- w/o = Walkover
- r = Retired
- d = Defaulted

=== Finals ===
Quarterfinals
1	(United States) Serena Williams	6	6
11	(Slovakia) Dominika Cibulková	2	2
(United States) Madison Keys	6	4	6
18	(United States) Venus Williams	3	6	4
10	(Russia) Ekaterina Makarova	6	6
3	(Romania) Simona Halep	4	0
7	(Canada) Eugenie Bouchard	3	2
2	(Russia) Maria Sharapova	6	6

Semifinals
1	(United States) Serena Williams	7^{7}	6
(United States) Madison Keys	6^{5}	2
10	(Russia) Ekaterina Makarova	3	2
2	(Russia) Maria Sharapova	6	6

Final
1	(United States) Serena Williams	6	7^{7}
2	(Russia) Maria Sharapova	3	6^{5}

=== Top half ===
==== Section 1 ====
First round
1	(United States) S Williams	6	6
(Belgium) A Van Uytvanck	0	4
PR	(Russia) V Zvonareva	6	6
Q	(Tunisia) O Jabeur	2	3
WC	(Australia) O Rogowska	4	1
(United States) N Gibbs	6	6
LL	(Kazakhstan) Y Putintseva	3	5
26	(Ukraine) E Svitolina	6	7
24	(Spain) G Muguruza	7	6
(New Zealand) M Erakovic	5	0
(Slovakia) D Hantuchová	6	6
(China) S Zheng	4	4
(Japan) K Date-Krumm	5	4
Q	(United States) A Tatishvili	7	6
(Switzerland) T Bacsinszky	6	6
15	(Serbia) J Janković	1	4

Second round
1	(United States) S Williams	7	6
PR	(Russia) V Zvonareva	5	0
(United States) N Gibbs	6^{3}	6^{6}
26	(Ukraine) E Svitolina	7^{7}	7^{8}
24	(Spain) G Muguruza	6	1	6
(Slovakia) D Hantuchová	1	6	0
Q	(United States) A Tatishvili	7^{7}	3	2
(Switzerland) T Bacsinszky	6^{5}	6	6

Third round
1	(United States) S Williams	4	6	6
26	(Ukraine) E Svitolina	6	2	0
24	(Spain) G Muguruza	6	4	6
(Switzerland) T Bacsinszky	3	6	0

Fourth round
1	(United States) S Williams	2	6	6
24	(Spain) G Muguruza	6	3	2

==== Section 2 ====
First round
11	(Slovakia) D Cibulková	3	6	6
(Belgium) K Flipkens	6	3	1
(Bulgaria) T Pironkova	6	6
(United Kingdom) H Watson	4	0
PR	(Switzerland) R Oprandi	0	2
Q	(Czech Republic) D Allertová	6	6
(China) S Zhang	3	2
19	(France) A Cornet	6	6
25	(Czech Republic) B Záhlavová-Strýcová	6	6
(Hungary) T Babos	4	4
(China) J Zheng	1	2
WC	(Chinese Taipei) K-c Chang	6	6
(United States) S Stephens	3	2
(Belarus) V Azarenka	6	6
(United States) T Townsend	6^{1}	2
8	(Denmark) C Wozniacki	7^{7}	6

Second round
11	(Slovakia) D Cibulková	6	6
(Bulgaria) T Pironkova	2	0
Q	(Czech Republic) D Allertová	4	7^{7}	2
19	(France) A Cornet	6	6^{2}	6
25	(Czech Republic) B Záhlavová-Strýcová	6	7
WC	(Chinese Taipei) K-c Chang	1	5
(Belarus) V Azarenka	6	6
8	(Denmark) C Wozniacki	4	2

Third round
11	(Slovakia) D Cibulková	7	6
19	(France) A Cornet	5	2
25	(Czech Republic) B Záhlavová-Strýcová	4	4
(Belarus) V Azarenka	6	6

Fourth round
11	(Slovakia) D Cibulková	6	3	6
(Belarus) V Azarenka	2	6	3

==== Section 3 ====
First round
4	(Czech Republic) P Kvitová	6	6
Q	(Netherlands) R Hogenkamp	1	4
(Croatia) D Vekić	6	4	2
(Germany) M Barthel	3	6	6
(Ukraine) L Tsurenko	3	5
(United States) M Keys	6	7
(Austria) Y Meusburger	4	0
29	(Australia) C Dellacqua	6	6
20	(Australia) S Stosur	6	6
(Romania) M Niculescu	4	1
(Italy) F Schiavone	2	2
(United States) C Vandeweghe	6	6
WC	(United States) I Falconi	2	6	7
(Estonia) K Kanepi	6	4	5
(United States) M Brengle	5	7^{7}	6
13	(Germany) A Petkovic	7	6^{4}	3

Second round
4	(Czech Republic) P Kvitová	6	6
(Germany) M Barthel	2	4
(United States) M Keys	2	6	6
29	(Australia) C Dellacqua	6	1	1
20	(Australia) S Stosur	4	4
(United States) C Vandeweghe	6	6
WC	(United States) I Falconi	1	3
(United States) M Brengle	6	6

Third round
4	(Czech Republic) P Kvitová	4	5
(United States) M Keys	6	7
(United States) C Vandeweghe	3	2
(United States) M Brengle	6	6

Fourth round
(United States) M Keys	6	6
(United States) M Brengle	2	4

==== Section 4 ====
First round
12	(Italy) F Pennetta	6	2	3
(Italy) C Giorgi	4	6	6
(Czech Republic) T Smitková	6	6
(Croatia) M Lučić-Baroni	1	1
(United States) L Davis	6	7
(Serbia) A Krunić	1	5
(Spain) MT Torró Flor	2	2
18	(United States) V Williams	6	6
30	(United States) V Lepchenko	6	6
(Russia) V Diatchenko	3	3
(United States) S Rogers	6	4	0
(Australia) A Tomljanović	4	6	6
(Russia) A Kudryavtseva	4	3
(Sweden) J Larsson	6	6
(Japan) K Nara	3	0
6	(Poland) A Radwańska	6	6

Second round
(Italy) C Giorgi	6	6
(Czech Republic) T Smitková	1	4
(United States) L Davis	2	3
18	(United States) V Williams	6	6
30	(United States) V Lepchenko	6	7^{7}
(Australia) A Tomljanović	1	6^{1}
(Sweden) J Larsson	0	1
6	(Poland) A Radwańska	6	6

Third round
(Italy) C Giorgi	6	6^{3}	1
18	(United States) V Williams	4	7^{7}	6
30	(United States) V Lepchenko	0	5
6	(Poland) A Radwańska	6	7

Fourth round
18	(United States) V Williams	6	2	6
6	(Poland) A Radwańska	3	6	1

=== Bottom half ===
==== Section 5 ====
First round
5	(Serbia) A Ivanovic	6	3	2
Q	(Czech Republic) L Hradecká	1	6	6
(Slovenia) P Hercog	3	6	6
(China) Q Wang	6	3	2
WC	(Australia) S Sanders	5	4
(Czech Republic) K Koukalová	7	6
(Germany) J Görges	6	6
32	(Switzerland) B Bencic	2	1
22	(Czech Republic) Ka Plíšková	7	6
Q	(Russia) E Rodina	5	1
(United States) A Riske	6^{5}	6	3
WC	(France) O Dodin	7^{7}	3	6
(Italy) R Vinci	7	6
(Serbia) B Jovanovski	5	1
(Belgium) A-S Mestach	2	2
10	(Russia) E Makarova	6	6

Second round
Q	(Czech Republic) L Hradecká	4	6	6
(Slovenia) P Hercog	6	3	2
(Czech Republic) K Koukalová	3	6	2
(Germany) J Görges	6	4	6
22	(Czech Republic) Ka Plíšková	7	5	6
WC	(France) O Dodin	5	7	4
(Italy) R Vinci	2	4
10	(Russia) E Makarova	6	6

Third round
Q	(Czech Republic) L Hradecká	6^{6}	5
(Germany) J Görges	7^{8}	7
22	(Czech Republic) Ka Plíšková	4	4
10	(Russia) E Makarova	6	6

Fourth round
(Germany) J Görges	3	2
10	(Russia) E Makarova	6	6

==== Section 6 ====
First round
14	(Italy) S Errani	6	6
(United States) G Min	1	0
(Spain) S Soler Espinosa	7	6
(Germany) A Beck	5	4
Q	(Czech Republic) R Voráčová	1	2
(Spain) L Arruabarrena	6	6
(Belgium) Y Wickmayer	4	6	6
23	(Russia) A Pavlyuchenkova	6	3	3
28	(Germany) S Lisicki	6	4	2
(France) K Mladenovic	4	6	6
WC	(China) Y Duan	4	6	3
PR	(United States) B Mattek-Sands	6	3	6
(Australia) J Gajdošová	6	6
(Romania) A Dulgheru	3	4
(Italy) K Knapp	3	2
3	(Romania) S Halep	6	6

Second round
14	(Italy) S Errani	7^{7}	6
(Spain) S Soler Espinosa	6^{3}	3
(Spain) L Arruabarrena	4	6	4
(Belgium) Y Wickmayer	6	4	6
(France) K Mladenovic	6^{3}	6^{6}
PR	(United States) B Mattek-Sands	7^{7}	7^{8}
(Australia) J Gajdošová	2	2
3	(Romania) S Halep	6	6

Third round
14	(Italy) S Errani	6	4	3
(Belgium) Y Wickmayer	4	6	6
PR	(United States) B Mattek-Sands	4	5
3	(Romania) S Halep	6	7

Fourth round
(Belgium) Y Wickmayer	4	2
3	(Romania) S Halep	6	6

==== Section 7 ====
First round
7	(Canada) E Bouchard	6	6
(Germany) A-L Friedsam	2	4
(Netherlands) K Bertens	7^{10}	5	6
WC	(Australia) D Gavrilova	6^{8}	7	2
(Switzerland) S Vögele	6	3	6
(France) P Parmentier	1	6	2
(France) C Garcia	6	6
27	(Russia) S Kuznetsova	4	2
17	(Spain) C Suárez Navarro	3	1
(Germany) C Witthöft	6	6
Q	(France) S Foretz	4	6	10
(United States) C McHale	6	1	12
(Russia) E Vesnina	2	5
(Czech Republic) K Siniaková	6	7
(Romania) I-C Begu	6	0	6
9	(Germany) A Kerber	4	6	1

Second round
7	(Canada) E Bouchard	6	6
(Netherlands) K Bertens	0	3
(Switzerland) S Vögele	3	4
(France) C Garcia	6	6
(Germany) C Witthöft	6	6
(United States) C McHale	3	0
(Czech Republic) K Siniaková	5	4
(Romania) I-C Begu	7	6

Third round
7	(Canada) E Bouchard	7	6
(France) C Garcia	5	0
(Germany) C Witthöft	4	4
(Romania) I-C Begu	6	6

Fourth round
7	(Canada) E Bouchard	6	5	6
(Romania) I-C Begu	1	7	2

==== Section 8 ====
First round
16	(Czech Republic) L Šafářová	4	6	6
(Kazakhstan) Y Shvedova	6	2	8
(Puerto Rico) M Puig	6	6
WC	(Australia) Ar Rodionova	0	3
(Croatia) A Konjuh	4	4
(Slovakia) M Rybáriková	6	6
Q	(Germany) T Maria	4	5
21	(China) S Peng	6	7
31	(Kazakhstan) Z Diyas	3	6	6
Q	(Poland) U Radwańska	6	4	2
(Slovakia) A Schmiedlová	6	4	6
(South Africa) C Scheepers	4	6	2
Q	(Russia) A Panova	7	6
(Romania) S Cîrstea	5	0
Q	(Croatia) P Martić	4	1
2	(Russia) M Sharapova	6	6

Second round
(Kazakhstan) Y Shvedova	6	7^{8}
(Puerto Rico) M Puig	2	6^{6}
(Slovakia) M Rybáriková	1	1
21	(China) S Peng	6	6
31	(Kazakhstan) Z Diyas	3	6	8
(Slovakia) A Schmiedlová	6	2	6
Q	(Russia) A Panova	1	6	5
2	(Russia) M Sharapova	6	4	7

Third round
(Kazakhstan) Y Shvedova	6^{7}	3
21	(China) S Peng	7^{9}	6
31	(Kazakhstan) Z Diyas	1	1
2	(Russia) M Sharapova	6	6

Fourth round
21	(China) S Peng	3	0
2	(Russia) M Sharapova	6	6

== Championship match statistics ==
Category	(United States) S. Williams	(Russia) Sharapova
1st serve %	44/68 (65%)	42/72 (58%)
1st serve points won	37 of 44 = 84%	28 of 42 = 67%
2nd serve points won	9 of 24 = 38%	14 of 30 = 47%
Total service points won	46 of 68 = 67.65%	42 of 72 = 58.33%
Aces	18	5
Double faults	4	4
Winners	38	20
Unforced errors	30	19
Net points won	6 of 7 = 86%	3 of 4 = 75%
Break points converted	3 of 7 = 43%	1 of 4 = 25%
Return points won	30 of 72 = 42%	22 of 68 = 32%
Total points won	76	64

Preceded by 2014 US Open – Women's singles	Grand Slam women's singles	Succeeded by 2015 French Open – Women's singles
