= 2015 Australian Open – Mixed doubles =

Mixed doubles
- 2015 Australian Open

Final
- Champions: (Switzerland) Martina Hingis (India) Leander Paes
- Runners-up: (France) Kristina Mladenovic (Canada) Daniel Nestor
- Score: 6–4, 6–3

Details
- Draw: 32
- Seeds: 8

Events
Singles	men	women		boys	girls
Doubles	men	women	mixed	boys	girls
WC Singles	men	women	quad
WC Doubles	men	women	quad
Legends	men	women	mixed
- Australian Open

Martina Hingis and Leander Paes defeated defending champions Kristina Mladenovic and Daniel Nestor in the final, 6–4, 6–3, to win the mixed doubles tennis title at the 2015 Australian Open. The victory earned both Hingis and Paes their second Grand Slam mixed doubles title and their first title together as a new pairing. This was also Hingis's first Grand Slam title since making her comeback from retirement in 2013.

== Seeds ==
1. (India) Sania Mirza / (Brazil) Bruno Soares (semifinals)
2. (Slovenia) Katarina Srebotnik / (Brazil) Marcelo Melo (quarterfinals)
3. (France) Kristina Mladenovic / (Canada) Daniel Nestor (final)
4. (Czech Republic) Andrea Hlaváčková / (Austria) Alexander Peya (quarterfinals)
5. (Zimbabwe) Cara Black / (Colombia) Juan Sebastián Cabal (quarterfinals)
6. (Kazakhstan) Yaroslava Shvedova / (Serbia) Nenad Zimonjić (first round)
7. (Switzerland) Martina Hingis / (India) Leander Paes (champions)
8. (Czech Republic) Květa Peschke / (Poland) Marcin Matkowski (first round)

== Draw ==
Key

- Q = Qualifier
- WC = Wild card
- LL = Lucky loser
- Alt = Alternate
- ITF = ITF entry
- PR = Protected ranking
- SR = Special ranking
- SE = Special exempt
- JE = Junior exempt
- JR = Junior Accelerator Programme entrant
- CO = College Accelerator Programme entrant
- NG = Next Gen Accelerator Program entrant
- w/o = Walkover
- r = Retired
- d = Defaulted

=== Finals ===
Semifinals
1	(India) Sania Mirza (Brazil) Bruno Soares	6	2	[8]
3	(France) Kristina Mladenovic (Canada) Daniel Nestor	3	6	[10]
7	(Switzerland) Martina Hingis (India) Leander Paes	7	6
(Chinese Taipei) Hsieh Su-wei (Uruguay) Pablo Cuevas	5	4

Final
3	(France) Kristina Mladenovic (Canada) Daniel Nestor	4	3
7	(Switzerland) Martina Hingis (India) Leander Paes	6	6

=== Top half ===
First round
1	(India) S Mirza (Brazil) B Soares	6	4	[10]
(Hungary) T Babos (United States) E Butorac	1	6	[3]
WC	(Australia) Ar Rodionova (Belarus) M Mirnyi	3	5
(United States) A Spears (Mexico) S González	6	7
(Czech Republic) L Hradecká (Romania) H Tecău	1	5
WC	(Slovenia) A Klepač (Australia) C Guccione	6	7
WC	(Australia) C Dellacqua (Australia) J Peers	7	6
8	(Czech Republic) K Peschke (Poland) M Matkowski	5	4
3	(France) K Mladenovic (Canada) D Nestor	6	3	[10]
(Czech Republic) B Záhlavová-Strýcová (India) R Bopanna	2	6	[4]
(Ukraine) E Svitolina (South Africa) R Klaasen	1	3
(Netherlands) M Krajicek (Romania) F Mergea	6	6
(United States) L Raymond (Sweden) R Lindstedt	6	6
(Australia) An Rodionova (Colombia) R Farah Maksoud	3	2
(Chinese Taipei) Y-j Chan (Croatia) M Draganja	2	7	[6]
5	(Zimbabwe) C Black (Colombia) JS Cabal	6	5	[10]

Second round
1	(India) S Mirza (Brazil) B Soares	7	6^{3}	[10]
(United States) A Spears (Mexico) S González	5	7^{7}	[8]
WC	(Slovenia) A Klepač (Australia) C Guccione	6	3	[5]
WC	(Australia) C Dellacqua (Australia) J Peers	3	6	[10]
3	(France) K Mladenovic (Canada) D Nestor	6	7
(Netherlands) M Krajicek (Romania) F Mergea	4	5
(United States) L Raymond (Sweden) R Lindstedt	4	7	[12]
5	(Zimbabwe) C Black (Colombia) JS Cabal	6	5	[14]

Quarterfinals
1	(India) S Mirza (Brazil) B Soares	6	6
WC	(Australia) C Dellacqua (Australia) J Peers	2	2
3	(France) K Mladenovic (Canada) D Nestor	6	6
5	(Zimbabwe) C Black (Colombia) JS Cabal	2	3

Semifinals
1	(India) S Mirza (Brazil) B Soares	6	2	[8]
3	(France) K Mladenovic (Canada) D Nestor	3	6	[10]

=== Bottom half ===
First round
7	(Switzerland) M Hingis (India) L Paes	6	7^{7}
WC	(Australia) M Jovanovic (Australia) S Thompson	2	6^{2}
(Spain) A Medina Garrigues (Spain) P Andújar	6	7^{7}
(Croatia) D Jurak (Croatia) I Dodig	2	6^{4}
WC	(Australia) J Gajdošová (India) M Bhupathi	6	6^{7}	[8]
(Chinese Taipei) H-c Chan (United Kingdom) J Murray	4	7^{9}	[10]
(United States) R Kops-Jones (United States) S Lipsky	1	3
4	(Czech Republic) A Hlaváčková (Austria) A Peya	6	6
6	(Kazakhstan) Y Shvedova (Serbia) N Zimonjić	4	7	[4]
(Chinese Taipei) S-w Hsieh (Uruguay) P Cuevas	6	5	[10]
(Germany) A-L Grönefeld (Netherlands) J-J Rojer	2	6	[6]
WC	(Chinese Taipei) K-c Chang (China) Z Zhang	6	4	[10]
WC	(Australia) D Gavrilova (Australia) L Saville	7^{8}	7
(Russia) A Kudryavtseva (Pakistan) A-u-H Qureshi	6^{6}	5
(Spain) A Parra Santonja (Spain) D Marrero	1	4
2	(Slovenia) K Srebotnik (Brazil) M Melo	6	6

Second round
7	(Switzerland) M Hingis (India) L Paes	6	6
(Spain) A Medina Garrigues (Spain) P Andújar	3	1
(Chinese Taipei) H-c Chan (United Kingdom) J Murray	6	4	[5]
4	(Czech Republic) A Hlaváčková (Austria) A Peya	3	6	[10]
(Chinese Taipei) S-w Hsieh (Uruguay) P Cuevas	3	6	[10]
WC	(Chinese Taipei) K-c Chang (China) Z Zhang	6	3	[6]
WC	(Australia) D Gavrilova (Australia) L Saville	3	2
2	(Slovenia) K Srebotnik (Brazil) M Melo	6	6

Quarterfinals
7	(Switzerland) M Hingis (India) L Paes	6	6
4	(Czech Republic) A Hlaváčková (Austria) A Peya	3	1
(Chinese Taipei) S-w Hsieh (Uruguay) P Cuevas	6	6
2	(Slovenia) K Srebotnik (Brazil) M Melo	1	2

Semifinals
7	(Switzerland) M Hingis (India) L Paes	7	6
(Chinese Taipei) S-w Hsieh (Uruguay) P Cuevas	5	4
