= Sara Tomic =

Australian tennis player

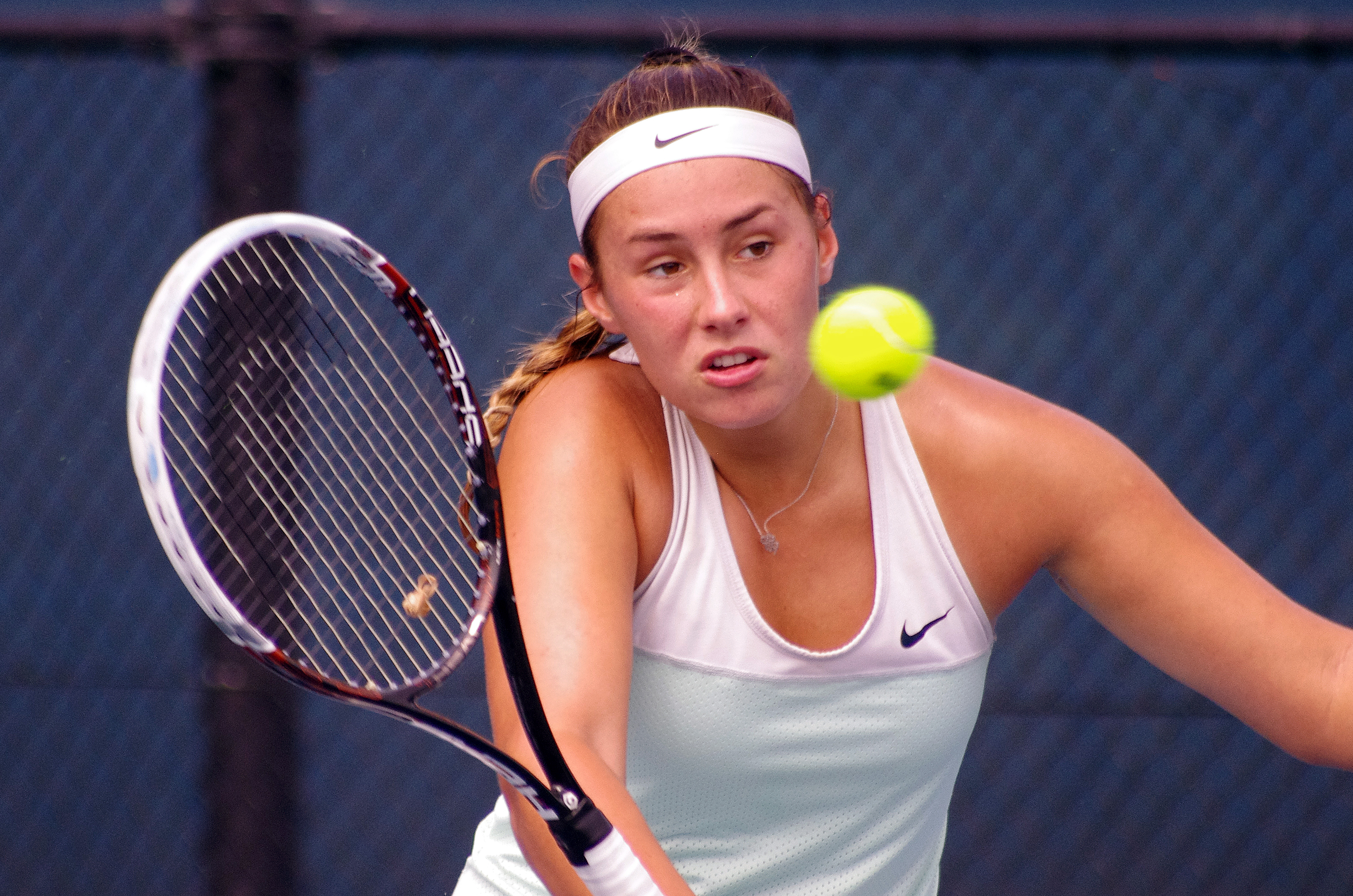
- Country (sports): Australia
- Residence: Southport, Australia
- Born: 5 February 1998 (age 28) Gold Coast, Australia
- Plays: Right-handed (two-handed backhand)
- Prize money: $64,386

Singles
- Career record: 93–76
- Career titles: 3 ITF
- Highest ranking: No. 379 (13 June 2016)

Grand Slam singles results
- Australian Open: Q1 (2014, 2015, 2016, 2018)

Doubles
- Career record: 23–30
- Career titles: 2 ITF
- Highest ranking: No. 553 (31 December 2018)

Grand Slam doubles results
- Australian Open: 1R (2015)

Sara Tomic (/ˈtɒmɪk/; Croatian: Sara Tomić, pronounced [sǎːra tômitɕ, - tǒː-]; born 5 February 1998) is an Australian former tennis player. She is the younger sister of tennis player Bernard Tomic.

In June 2015, she won her first professional-level title in Sharm El Sheikh, Egypt.

Tomic was born in Gold Coast, Queensland, and made her senior Grand Slam debut at the 2015 Australian Open, in the doubles event partnering Naiktha Bains.

== Career ==
=== 2014 ===
Tomic mainly played on the ITF Junior Circuit. She was given wildcards into the Sydney International, Australian Open and Burnie International where she lost in first rounds. In the junior events, she won a Grade-4 event in Kawana and a Grade-B2 event in Lautoka, Fiji. She was also runner-up in a Grade 3 in Beijing and a Grade 4 in Burleigh Waters. She won two doubles titles partnering Xu Shilin including the Grade-A Osaka Mayor's Cup and a Grade B1 in Seogwipo.

=== 2015 ===
Tomic had received wildcards into the Sydney International losing to Alexandra Dulgheru in

Tomic then decided to focus on the pro circuit instead, winning her first title at Sharm El Sheikh in July, and boosting her ranking into the top 500.

== Personal life ==
Her parents, Bosnian Croat father (from Tuzla), John (Ivica) and Bosniak mother, Adisa (from Brčko), left Socialist Yugoslavia in 1992.

== ITF Circuit finals ==
Legend
$25,000 tournaments
$10/15,000 tournaments

=== Singles (3–3) ===
Result	No.	Date	Tournament	Surface	Opponent	Score
Loss	1.	14 June 2015	ITF Sharm El Sheikh, Egypt	Hard	(Italy) Alice Matteucci	4–6, 2–6
Win	1.	21 June 2015	ITF Sharm El Sheikh	Hard	(Netherlands) Eva Wacanno	6–4, 6–1
Loss	2.	16 August 2015	ITF Sharm El Sheikh	Hard	(Slovakia) Tereza Mihalíková	2–6, 0–6
Loss	3.	23 August 2015	ITF Sharm El Sheikh	Hard	(Italy) Anastasia Grymalska	6–3, 6–7^{(7)}, 4–6
Win	2.	15 May 2016	ITF Sharm El Sheikh	Hard	(Russia) Anna Morgina	6–4, 6–1
Win	3.	7 August 2017	ITF Nonthaburi, Thailand	Hard	(China) Yuan Yue	6–4, 4–6, 6–1

=== Doubles (2–1) ===
Result	No.	Date	Tournament	Surface	Partner	Opponents	Score
Loss	1.	11 April 2015	ITF Antalya, Turkey	Hard	(Russia) Ksenia Gaydarzhi	(Ukraine) Alona Fomina (Slovakia) Chantal Škamlová	2–6, 1–6
Win	1.	15 August 2015	ITF Sharm El Sheikh	Hard	(Republic of Ireland) Jenny Claffey	(Oman) Fatma Al-Nabhani (Sweden) Anette Munozova	6–4, 6–0
Win	2.	14 May 2016	ITF Sharm El Sheikh	Hard	(Russia) Anna Morgina	(Greece) Eleni Kordolaimi (Sweden) Anette Munozova	6–3, 6–2
