= 2016 Australian Open – Women's singles qualifying =

Women's singles qualifying
- 2016 Australian Open

Events
Singles	men	women		boys	girls
Doubles	men	women	mixed	boys	girls
WC Singles	men	women	quad
WC Doubles	men	women	quad
Legends	men	women	mixed

Qualification
Singles	men	women
- Australian Open

This article displays the qualifying draw for women's singles at the 2016 Australian Open.

This was the first time 2010 French Open champion Francesca Schiavone contested the qualifying competition of a major since the 2000 US Open but she lost in the second round to Virginie Razzano, ended her streak of consecutive appearances in the main draw of Grand Slam singles events at 61, the second longest streak after Ai Sugiyama, in the Open Era.

== Seeds ==
1. (China) Wang Qiang (qualified)
2. (United States) Nicole Gibbs (qualified)
3. (United Kingdom) Naomi Broady (first round)
4. (Bulgaria) Sesil Karatantcheva (first round)
5. (Latvia) Anastasija Sevastova (qualified)
6. (Italy) Francesca Schiavone (second round)
7. (Czech Republic) Kristýna Plíšková (qualified)
8. (China) Duan Yingying (second round, retired)
9. (Switzerland) Stefanie Vögele (second round)
10. (France) Pauline Parmentier (first round)
11. (Russia) Elena Vesnina (first round)
12. (Romania) Patricia Maria Țig (first round)
13. (Spain) María Teresa Torró Flor (first round)
14. (Austria) Tamira Paszek (qualified)
15. (United States) Sachia Vickery (qualifying competition)
16. (Israel) Julia Glushko (qualifying competition)
17. (Czech Republic) Tereza Smitková (second round)
18. (China) Zhang Shuai (qualified)
19. (Turkey) Çağla Büyükakçay (first round)
20. (Sweden) Rebecca Peterson (first round)
21. (Russia) Alexandra Panova (second round)
22. (Chinese Taipei) Chang Kai-chen (second round)
23. (Netherlands) Richèl Hogenkamp (qualifying competition)
24. (New Zealand) Marina Erakovic (first round)

== Qualifiers ==
1. (China) Wang Qiang
2. (United States) Nicole Gibbs
3. (China) Wang Yafan
4. (Japan) Naomi Osaka
5. (Latvia) Anastasija Sevastova
6. (China) Zhang Shuai
7. (Czech Republic) Kristýna Plíšková
8. (Switzerland) Viktorija Golubic
9. (Thailand) Luksika Kumkhum
10. (Ukraine) Maryna Zanevska
11. (Greece) Maria Sakkari
12. (Austria) Tamira Paszek

== Draw ==
=== First qualifier ===
First round
1	(China) Wang Qiang	7	6
(Japan) Misa Eguchi	5	2
(France) Mathilde Johansson	6	2	5
(China) Yang Zhaoxuan	1	6	7
(France) Stéphanie Foretz	6	6
(Serbia) Jovana Jakšić	1	1
(Argentina) María Irigoyen	2	1
23	(Netherlands) Richèl Hogenkamp	6	6

Second round
1	(China) Wang Qiang	6	5	6
(China) Yang Zhaoxuan	4	7	2
(France) Stéphanie Foretz	1	3
23	(Netherlands) Richèl Hogenkamp	6	6

Qualifying competition
1	(China) Wang Qiang	6	6
23	(Netherlands) Richèl Hogenkamp	2	3

=== Second qualifier ===
First round
2	(United States) Nicole Gibbs	6	6
WC	(Australia) Olivia Tjandramulia	2	2
WC	(Australia) Sara Tomic	3	2
(Croatia) Jana Fett	6	6
WC	(Australia) Olivia Rogowska	1	1
(Serbia) Ivana Jorović	6	6
(Spain) Laura Pous Tió	2	0^{r}
22	(Chinese Taipei) Chang Kai-chen	6	3

Second round
2	(United States) Nicole Gibbs	6	7^{7}
(Croatia) Jana Fett	2	6^{4}
(Serbia) Ivana Jorović	6	6
22	(Chinese Taipei) Chang Kai-chen	4	2

Qualifying competition
2	(United States) Nicole Gibbs	6	6
(Serbia) Ivana Jorović	3	3

=== Third qualifier ===
First round
3	(United Kingdom) Naomi Broady	3	6	3
(France) Alizé Lim	6	2	6
(China) Wang Yafan	6	7
(United States) Katerina Stewart	3	5
PR	(Canada) Aleksandra Wozniak	3	3
(Slovakia) Kristína Kučová	6	6
(Ukraine) Olga Savchuk	6^{8}	3
17	(Czech Republic) Tereza Smitková	7^{10}	6

Second round
(France) Alizé Lim	6	4	1
(China) Wang Yafan	1	6	6
(Slovakia) Kristína Kučová	7	6
17	(Czech Republic) Tereza Smitková	5	0

Qualifying competition
(China) Wang Yafan	5	7^{7}	6
(Slovakia) Kristína Kučová	7	6^{5}	3

=== Fourth qualifier ===
First round
4	(Bulgaria) Sesil Karatantcheva	2	0
(United States) Jessica Pegula	6	6
(South Korea) Jang Su-jeong	2	3
(China) Zhang Kailin	6	6
(Japan) Miyu Kato	0	3
(Japan) Naomi Osaka	6	6
(Mexico) Marcela Zacarías	1	1
21	(Russia) Alexandra Panova	6	6

Second round
(United States) Jessica Pegula	2	3
(China) Zhang Kailin	6	6
(Japan) Naomi Osaka	6	7^{7}
21	(Russia) Alexandra Panova	2	6^{4}

Qualifying competition
(China) Zhang Kailin	2	1
(Japan) Naomi Osaka	6	6

=== Fifth qualifier ===
First round
5	(Latvia) Anastasija Sevastova	6	6
WC	(Australia) Destanee Aiava	3	2
PR	(Russia) Vera Dushevina	2	6	8
(Turkey) İpek Soylu	6	2	6
(United States) Julia Boserup	6	7
(Japan) Mayo Hibi	2	5
(Poland) Paula Kania	2	6	6
13	(Spain) María Teresa Torró Flor	6	4	2

Second round
5	(Latvia) Anastasija Sevastova	6	6
PR	(Russia) Vera Dushevina	3	1
(United States) Julia Boserup	6	7
(Poland) Paula Kania	2	5

Qualifying competition
5	(Latvia) Anastasija Sevastova	4	6	6
(United States) Julia Boserup	6	3	2

=== Sixth qualifier ===
First round
6	(Italy) Francesca Schiavone	7^{7}	4	6
(Belgium) An-Sophie Mestach	6^{2}	6	0
(France) Virginie Razzano	6	6
(United States) Kristie Ahn	4	3
(Russia) Irina Khromacheva	0	3
(Czech Republic) Tereza Martincová	6	6
(Luxembourg) Mandy Minella	3	2
18	(China) Zhang Shuai	6	6

Second round
6	(Italy) Francesca Schiavone	1	6	1
(France) Virginie Razzano	6	4	6
(Czech Republic) Tereza Martincová	1	6^{2}
18	(China) Zhang Shuai	6	7^{7}

Qualifying competition
(France) Virginie Razzano	6	2	6
18	(China) Zhang Shuai	4	6	8

=== Seventh qualifier ===
First round
7	(Czech Republic) Kristýna Plíšková	6	4	6
(Israel) Shahar Pe'er	4	6	3
(Belgium) Ysaline Bonaventure	6	6
WC	(Australia) Zoe Hives	2	4
(Paraguay) Verónica Cepede Royg	2	4
(Slovakia) Jana Čepelová	6	6
WC	(Australia) Naiktha Bains	1	2
15	(United States) Sachia Vickery	6	6

Second round
7	(Czech Republic) Kristýna Plíšková	7	6
(Belgium) Ysaline Bonaventure	5	1
(Slovakia) Jana Čepelová	4	5
15	(United States) Sachia Vickery	6	7

Qualifying competition
7	(Czech Republic) Kristýna Plíšková	2	6	7
15	(United States) Sachia Vickery	6	2	5

=== Eighth qualifier ===
First round
8	(China) Duan Yingying	6	6
(Croatia) Petra Martić	1	2
(Liechtenstein) Stephanie Vogt	4	1
WC	(Australia) Arina Rodionova	6	6
(Switzerland) Viktorija Golubic	4	6	6
(Russia) Alla Kudryavtseva	6	4	1
(Netherlands) Lesley Kerkhove	7^{7}	6
20	(Sweden) Rebecca Peterson	6^{5}	3

Second round
8	(China) Duan Yingying	1^{r}
WC	(Australia) Arina Rodionova	2
(Switzerland) Viktorija Golubic	7	6
(Netherlands) Lesley Kerkhove	5	2

Qualifying competition
WC	(Australia) Arina Rodionova	2	1
(Switzerland) Viktorija Golubic	6	6

=== Ninth qualifier ===
First round
9	(Switzerland) Stefanie Vögele	7^{7}	6
WC	(Slovakia) Tereza Mihalíková	6^{0}	3
(United States) Alexa Glatch	3	1
(Thailand) Luksika Kumkhum	6	6
(Japan) Kimiko Date-Krumm	2	7^{7}	4
(France) Amandine Hesse	6	6^{3}	6
(Japan) Eri Hozumi	1	3
16	(Israel) Julia Glushko	6	6

Second round
9	(Switzerland) Stefanie Vögele	3	4
(Thailand) Luksika Kumkhum	6	6
(France) Amandine Hesse	1	6	3
16	(Israel) Julia Glushko	6	3	6

Qualifying competition
(Thailand) Luksika Kumkhum	6	6
16	(Israel) Julia Glushko	4	2

=== Tenth qualifier ===
First round
10	(France) Pauline Parmentier	3	2
(Japan) Risa Ozaki	6	6
(China) Zhang Yuxuan	5	7^{7}	4
(Ukraine) Maryna Zanevska	7	6^{5}	6
(United States) Maria Sanchez	6	6
(China) Liu Fangzhou	4	2
PR	(Portugal) Michelle Larcher de Brito	0	6	7
24	(New Zealand) Marina Erakovic	6	4	5

Second round
(Japan) Risa Ozaki	2	1
(Ukraine) Maryna Zanevska	6	6
(United States) Maria Sanchez	2	3
PR	(Portugal) Michelle Larcher de Brito	6	6

Qualifying competition
(Ukraine) Maryna Zanevska	6	7
PR	(Portugal) Michelle Larcher de Brito	3	5

=== Eleventh qualifier ===
First round
11	(Russia) Elena Vesnina	3	6	7
(China) Zhu Lin	6	4	9
(Netherlands) Cindy Burger	3	1
(Spain) Sara Sorribes Tormo	6	6
(Belgium) Elise Mertens	7	6
PR	(Canada) Heidi El Tabakh	5	2
(Greece) Maria Sakkari	4	6	7
19	(Turkey) Çağla Büyükakçay	6	4	5

Second round
(China) Zhu Lin	6	6
(Spain) Sara Sorribes Tormo	3	2
(Belgium) Elise Mertens	6	4	2
(Greece) Maria Sakkari	2	6	6

Qualifying competition
(China) Zhu Lin	3	2
(Greece) Maria Sakkari	6	6

=== Twelfth qualifier ===
First round
12	(Romania) Patricia Maria Țig	6^{5}	7^{7}	3
(Czech Republic) Barbora Krejčíková	7^{7}	6^{1}	6
(Japan) Hiroko Kuwata	6	6^{4}	12
(Spain) Sílvia Soler Espinosa	3	7^{7}	10
PR	(Spain) María José Martínez Sánchez	1	7^{7}	6
(Czech Republic) Andrea Hlaváčková	6	6^{3}	1
(Ukraine) Kateryna Kozlova	2	4
14	(Austria) Tamira Paszek	6	6

Second round
(Czech Republic) Barbora Krejčíková	6	6
(Japan) Hiroko Kuwata	3	2
PR	(Spain) María José Martínez Sánchez	1	1
14	(Austria) Tamira Paszek	6	6

Qualifying competition
(Czech Republic) Barbora Krejčíková	4	2
14	(Austria) Tamira Paszek	6	6
