= 2016 Australian Open – Men's singles qualifying =

Men's singles qualifying
- 2016 Australian Open

Events
Singles	men	women		boys	girls
Doubles	men	women	mixed	boys	girls
WC Singles	men	women	quad
WC Doubles	men	women	quad
Legends	men	women	mixed

Qualification
Singles	men	women
- Australian Open

This article displays the qualifying draw for the men's singles at the 2016 Australian Open.

== Draw ==
=== Seeds ===
1. (Italy) Luca Vanni (first round)
2. (Belgium) Ruben Bemelmans (qualifying competition)
3. (United States) Tim Smyczek (qualified)
4. (Colombia) Alejandro Falla (second round)
5. (Germany) Jan-Lennard Struff (second round)
6. (Slovakia) Lukáš Lacko (first round)
7. (Turkey) Marsel İlhan (first round)
8. (Japan) Go Soeda (second round)
9. (Germany) Michael Berrer (second round)
10. (Moldova) Radu Albot (second round)
11. (France) Édouard Roger-Vasselin (qualifying competition)
12. (Japan) Yūichi Sugita (qualified)
13. (Japan) Tatsuma Ito (qualified)
14. (Belgium) Kimmer Coppejans (second round)
15. (Germany) Dustin Brown (first round)
16. (Australia) John-Patrick Smith (second round)
17. (United States) Bjorn Fratangelo (qualifying competition, lucky loser)
18. (Russia) Konstantin Kravchuk (second round)
19. (United States) Ryan Harrison (qualified)
20. (Portugal) Gastão Elias (first round)
21. (United States) Jared Donaldson (first round)
22. (Bosnia and Herzegovina) Mirza Bašić (qualified)
23. (Slovakia) Norbert Gombos (second round)
24. (Colombia) Alejandro González (qualifying competition)
25. (Sweden) Elias Ymer (first round)
26. (Italy) Thomas Fabbiano (second round)
27. (Slovenia) Blaž Rola (first round)
28. (Netherlands) Igor Sijsling (second round)
29. (France) Kenny de Schepper (qualifying competition)
30. (Germany) Daniel Brands (qualified)
31. (Brazil) André Ghem (first round)
32. (United States) Dennis Novikov (qualifying competition)

=== Qualifiers ===
1. (United Kingdom) Daniel Evans
2. (Slovakia) Jozef Kovalík
3. (United States) Tim Smyczek
4. (China) Wu Di
5. (Czech Republic) Radek Štěpánek
6. (Bosnia and Herzegovina) Mirza Bašić
7. (United States) Ryan Harrison
8. (Germany) Peter Gojowczyk
9. (United States) Taylor Fritz
10. (Germany) Daniel Brands
11. (France) Pierre-Hugues Herbert
12. (Japan) Yūichi Sugita
13. (Japan) Tatsuma Ito
14. (France) Stéphane Robert
15. (Argentina) Marco Trungelliti
16. (Argentina) Renzo Olivo

=== Lucky losers ===
1. (United States) Bjorn Fratangelo

=== Draw ===
==== First qualifier ====
First round
1	(Italy) Luca Vanni	6^{5}	4
(United Kingdom) Daniel Evans	7^{7}	6
(Israel) Amir Weintraub	4	6	6
(Australia) Luke Saville	6	3	4
(Spain) Oriol Roca Batalla	6	7^{7}
(South Korea) Lee Duck-hee	3	6^{1}
(Canada) Frank Dancevic	6^{5}	1
17	(United States) Bjorn Fratangelo	7^{7}	6

Second round
(United Kingdom) Daniel Evans	7	6^{4}	6
(Israel) Amir Weintraub	5	7^{7}	2
(Spain) Oriol Roca Batalla	6	3	2
17	(United States) Bjorn Fratangelo	3	6	6

Qualifying competition
(United Kingdom) Daniel Evans	7	4	6
17	(United States) Bjorn Fratangelo	5	6	0

==== Second qualifier ====
First round
2	(Belgium) Ruben Bemelmans	7^{7}	6
WC	(Australia) Harry Bourchier	6^{5}	3
(Germany) Nils Langer	6	2	0
(Belarus) Egor Gerasimov	4	6	6
(Slovakia) Jozef Kovalík	7	6
(Serbia) Peđa Krstin	5	1
(Italy) Matteo Donati	2	6	6
27	(Slovenia) Blaž Rola	6	1	4

Second round
2	(Belgium) Ruben Bemelmans	6	3	6
(Belarus) Egor Gerasimov	4	6	1
(Slovakia) Jozef Kovalík	6	6
(Italy) Matteo Donati	2	3

Qualifying competition
2	(Belgium) Ruben Bemelmans	2	6^{7}
(Slovakia) Jozef Kovalík	6	7^{9}

==== Third qualifier ====
First round
3	(United States) Tim Smyczek	6	6
(Brazil) José Pereira	3	3
(Russia) Aslan Karatsev	6	6
(Croatia) Franko Škugor	4	4
(Estonia) Jürgen Zopp	2	6	6
(India) Somdev Devvarman	6	1	4
(Austria) Bastian Trinker	7^{7}	5	0
29	(France) Kenny de Schepper	6^{3}	7	6

Second round
3	(United States) Tim Smyczek	6	6
(Russia) Aslan Karatsev	3	4
(Estonia) Jürgen Zopp	5	7	10
29	(France) Kenny de Schepper	7	5	12

Qualifying competition
3	(United States) Tim Smyczek	3	7	6
29	(France) Kenny de Schepper	6	5	3

==== Fourth qualifier ====
First round
4	(Colombia) Alejandro Falla	6	6
(United States) Daniel Nguyen	1	4
(Chinese Taipei) Yang Tsung-hua	4	6^{4}
(Belgium) Niels Desein	6	7^{7}
(China) Wu Di	6	7
(Chinese Taipei) Chen Ti	2	5
(Belarus) Uladzimir Ignatik	7	3	2
26	(Italy) Thomas Fabbiano	5	6	6

Second round
4	(Colombia) Alejandro Falla	7	5	1
(Belgium) Niels Desein	5	7	6
(China) Wu Di	6	6
26	(Italy) Thomas Fabbiano	1	4

Qualifying competition
(Belgium) Niels Desein	3	1
(China) Wu Di	6	6

==== Fifth qualifier ====
First round
5	(Germany) Jan-Lennard Struff	6	6
(Chile) Hans Podlipnik-Castillo	4	3
(Czech Republic) Radek Štěpánek	6	3	6
(Czech Republic) Jan Šátral	2	6	4
WC	(Australia) Marinko Matosevic	6	6
(France) Grégoire Barrère	2	4
(Switzerland) Henri Laaksonen	2	7^{7}	5
24	(Colombia) Alejandro González	6	6^{3}	7

Second round
5	(Germany) Jan-Lennard Struff	4	4
(Czech Republic) Radek Štěpánek	6	6
WC	(Australia) Marinko Matosevic	1	6	2
24	(Colombia) Alejandro González	6	4	6

Qualifying competition
(Czech Republic) Radek Štěpánek	6	6
24	(Colombia) Alejandro González	3	1

==== Sixth qualifier ====
First round
6	(Slovakia) Lukáš Lacko	4	6^{7}
(Italy) Lorenzo Giustino	6	7^{9}
(India) Saketh Myneni	6	6
(India) Ramkumar Ramanathan	4	1
(Italy) Gianluca Naso	6^{5}	4
(Romania) Marius Copil	7^{7}	6
(France) Mathias Bourgue	6^{5}	4
22	(Bosnia and Herzegovina) Mirza Bašić	7^{7}	6

Second round
(Italy) Lorenzo Giustino	1	6^{7}
(India) Saketh Myneni	6	7^{9}
(Romania) Marius Copil	3	6^{1}
22	(Bosnia and Herzegovina) Mirza Bašić	6	7^{7}

Qualifying competition
(India) Saketh Myneni	6	4	6
22	(Bosnia and Herzegovina) Mirza Bašić	3	6	8

==== Seventh qualifier ====
First round
7	(Turkey) Marsel İlhan	6	3	4
(Kazakhstan) Aleksandr Nedovyesov	2	6	6
(Italy) Federico Gaio	3	4
(Bosnia and Herzegovina) Aldin Šetkić	6	6
WC	(Australia) Bradley Mousley	6	0^{r}
(Ukraine) Denys Molchanov	3	0
(Italy) Salvatore Caruso	3	6^{3}
19	(United States) Ryan Harrison	6	7^{7}

Second round
(Kazakhstan) Aleksandr Nedovyesov	6	2	6
(Bosnia and Herzegovina) Aldin Šetkić	2	6	0
(Ukraine) Denys Molchanov	3	1
19	(United States) Ryan Harrison	6	6

Qualifying competition
(Kazakhstan) Aleksandr Nedovyesov	7^{10}	6^{6}	3
19	(United States) Ryan Harrison	6^{8}	7^{8}	6

==== Eighth qualifier ====
First round
8	(Japan) Go Soeda	6	2	6
(Germany) Maximilian Marterer	2	6	4
(Italy) Alessandro Giannessi	6^{3}	2
(Russia) Alexander Kudryavtsev	7^{7}	6
(United Kingdom) Brydan Klein	5	2
(Germany) Peter Gojowczyk	7	6
(United States) Frances Tiafoe	6	6
21	(United States) Jared Donaldson	3	3

Second round
8	(Japan) Go Soeda	6	3	2
(Russia) Alexander Kudryavtsev	3	6	6
(Germany) Peter Gojowczyk	6	6
(United States) Frances Tiafoe	3	2

Qualifying competition
(Russia) Alexander Kudryavtsev	6	6^{3}	2
(Germany) Peter Gojowczyk	3	7^{7}	6

==== Ninth qualifier ====
First round
9	(Germany) Michael Berrer	7	6
(France) Tristan Lamasine	5	2
(United States) Taylor Fritz	6	6
(Japan) Hiroki Moriya	3	1
(Germany) Mischa Zverev	6	6
(Italy) Andrea Arnaboldi	2	2
(Italy) Roberto Marcora	7^{9}	5	4
23	(Slovakia) Norbert Gombos	6^{7}	7	6

Second round
9	(Germany) Michael Berrer	3	6	1
(United States) Taylor Fritz	6	1	6
(Germany) Mischa Zverev	6	6
23	(Slovakia) Norbert Gombos	1	2

Qualifying competition
(United States) Taylor Fritz	6	6^{5}	6
(Germany) Mischa Zverev	3	7^{7}	4

==== Tenth qualifier ====
First round
10	(Moldova) Radu Albot	6	7^{7}
(Czech Republic) Jan Mertl	3	6^{2}
(France) Calvin Hemery	3	4
(Republic of Ireland) James McGee	6	6
(France) Maxime Chazal	3	7	13
WC	(France) Maxime Janvier	6	5	15
(Serbia) Laslo Djere	4	4
30	(Germany) Daniel Brands	6	6

Second round
10	(Moldova) Radu Albot	6	1	2
(Republic of Ireland) James McGee	1	6	6
WC	(France) Maxime Janvier	7^{7}	3	2
30	(Germany) Daniel Brands	6^{4}	6	6

Qualifying competition
(Republic of Ireland) James McGee	6^{1}	4
30	(Germany) Daniel Brands	7^{7}	6

==== Eleventh qualifier ====
First round
11	(France) Édouard Roger-Vasselin	1	6	6
(China) Li Zhe	6	2	3
(Spain) Jordi Samper-Montaña	6	6
(Belgium) Germain Gigounon	1	2
(United States) Mitchell Krueger	4	6	4
PR	(Switzerland) Marco Chiudinelli	6	2	6
(France) Pierre-Hugues Herbert	7^{7}	3	6
20	(Portugal) Gastão Elias	6^{6}	6	3

Second round
11	(France) Édouard Roger-Vasselin	6	6
(Spain) Jordi Samper-Montaña	3	2
PR	(Switzerland) Marco Chiudinelli	6^{5}	4
(France) Pierre-Hugues Herbert	7^{7}	6

Qualifying competition
11	(France) Édouard Roger-Vasselin	3	6	7
(France) Pierre-Hugues Herbert	6	1	9

==== Twelfth qualifier ====
First round
12	(Japan) Yūichi Sugita	7	4	6
PR	(Croatia) Ante Pavić	5	6	1
(Uzbekistan) Farrukh Dustov	7^{7}	4	2
(Belgium) Yannick Mertens	6^{4}	6	6
(United Kingdom) James Ward	7^{8}	6
PR	(Canada) Peter Polansky	6^{6}	4
WC	(Australia) Marc Polmans	4	6^{4}
32	(United States) Dennis Novikov	6	7^{7}

Second round
12	(Japan) Yūichi Sugita	6	5	6
(Belgium) Yannick Mertens	3	7	4
(United Kingdom) James Ward	4	5
32	(United States) Dennis Novikov	6	7

Qualifying competition
12	(Japan) Yūichi Sugita	6	4	6
32	(United States) Dennis Novikov	4	6	3

==== Thirteenth qualifier ====
First round
13	(Japan) Tatsuma Ito	6	6
(Hungary) Márton Fucsovics	1	3
(United States) Tennys Sandgren	6	6
(Japan) Yasutaka Uchiyama	1	3
WC	(Australia) Oliver Anderson	6	6
WC	(Australia) Gavin van Peperzeel	4	3
(Spain) Adrián Menéndez-Maceiras	6	4	6
31	(Brazil) André Ghem	3	6	3

Second round
13	(Japan) Tatsuma Ito	6	6
(United States) Tennys Sandgren	4	2
WC	(Australia) Oliver Anderson	4	2
(Spain) Adrián Menéndez-Maceiras	6	6

Qualifying competition
13	(Japan) Tatsuma Ito	6	1	6
(Spain) Adrián Menéndez-Maceiras	4	6	4

==== Fourteenth qualifier ====
First round
14	(Belgium) Kimmer Coppejans	6	6
WC	(Australia) Alex De Minaur	3	3
(Russia) Karen Khachanov	6	7
(Slovenia) Grega Žemlja	4	5
WC	(Australia) Alex Bolt	6	2	2
(France) Stéphane Robert	3	6	6
(Colombia) Eduardo Struvay	3	3
28	(Netherlands) Igor Sijsling	6	6

Second round
14	(Belgium) Kimmer Coppejans	3	2
(Russia) Karen Khachanov	6	6
(France) Stéphane Robert	7	7
28	(Netherlands) Igor Sijsling	5	5

Qualifying competition
(Russia) Karen Khachanov	6	4	2
(France) Stéphane Robert	1	6	6

==== Fifteenth qualifier ====
First round
15	(Germany) Dustin Brown	3	3
(Austria) Dennis Novak	6	6
(Kazakhstan) Dmitry Popko	4	4
(Argentina) Marco Trungelliti	6	6
(China) Bai Yan	6	6
(United States) Connor Smith	2	3
(Kazakhstan) Andrey Golubev	7^{7}	6^{5}	2
18	(Russia) Konstantin Kravchuk	6^{1}	7^{7}	6

Second round
(Austria) Dennis Novak	3	4
(Argentina) Marco Trungelliti	6	6
(China) Bai Yan	2	6	8
18	(Russia) Konstantin Kravchuk	6	4	6

Qualifying competition
(Argentina) Marco Trungelliti	6	6^{8}	3
(China) Bai Yan	4	7^{10}	0^{r}

==== Sixteenth qualifier ====
First round
16	(Australia) John-Patrick Smith	6	6
(Austria) Michael Linzer	4	0
(France) David Guez	3	6^{2}
(France) Vincent Millot	6	7^{7}
(Australia) Benjamin Mitchell	6	6
(Barbados) Darian King	2	4
(Argentina) Renzo Olivo	3	6	6
25	(Sweden) Elias Ymer	6	3	2

Second round
16	(Australia) John-Patrick Smith	2	5
(France) Vincent Millot	6	7
(Australia) Benjamin Mitchell	7^{13}	5	2
(Argentina) Renzo Olivo	6^{11}	7	6

Qualifying competition
(France) Vincent Millot	2	4
(Argentina) Renzo Olivo	6	6
