= Jack Mingjie Lin =

Canadian tennis player

- Country (sports): Canada
- Residence: Markham, Ontario, Canada
- Born: April 15, 1999 (age 26) Newfoundland, Canada
- Height: 1.78 m (5 ft 10 in)
- Plays: Right-handed (two-handed backhand)
- College: Columbia University
- Prize money: $16,865

Singles
- Career record: 0–1
- Career titles: 0
- Highest ranking: No. 605 (15 July 2019)

Grand Slam singles results
- Australian Open Junior: 2R (2016)
- US Open Junior: Q2 (2016)

Doubles
- Career record: 0
- Career titles: 0
- Highest ranking: No. 1,119 (27 July 2015)

Grand Slam doubles results
- Australian Open Junior: 1R (2016)
- Last updated on: 16 February 2026.

Jack Mingjie Lin (born April 15, 1999) is an inactive professional tennis player from Canada.

Mingjie Lin reached a career high ATP men's singles ranking of No. 605 on 15 July 2019. He made his ATP Tour debut by receiving a wild card to the 2019 New York Open, where he lost his 1st round match to eventual finalist Brayden Schnur.
