= Anthony Jackie Tang =

Hong Kong tennis player

- Country (sports): Hong Kong
- Born: 26 November 1998 (age 27) Hong Kong
- Height: 1.83 m (6 ft 0 in)
- Plays: Right-handed (double-handed backhand)
- College: Columbia University
- Prize money: $5,190

Singles
- Career record: 2–2 (at ATP Tour level, Grand Slam level, and in Davis Cup)
- Career titles: 0
- Highest ranking: No. 1,178 (27 November 2017)

Grand Slam singles results
- Australian Open Junior: 2R (2016)
- Wimbledon Junior: 1R (2016)
- US Open Junior: Q1 (2016)

Doubles
- Career record: 0–0 (at ATP Tour level, Grand Slam level, and in Davis Cup)
- Career titles: 0
- Highest ranking: No. 1,260 (19 March 2018)

Grand Slam doubles results
- Australian Open Junior: 1R (2016)
- Wimbledon Junior: 2R (2016)
- US Open Junior: QF (2016)

Team competitions
- Davis Cup: 2–2

Anthony Jackie Tang (Chinese: 唐嘉傑; born 26 November 1998) is a Hong Kong tennis player.

Tang has a career high ATP singles ranking of No. 1,178 achieved on 27 November 2017 and a career high ATP doubles ranking of No. 1,260 also achieved on 19 March 2018.

Tang has represented Hong Kong at the Davis Cup, where he has a win–loss record of 2–2.
