= Kristofer Siimar =

Estonian tennis player

- Country (sports): Estonia
- Born: 3 February 1998 (age 27) Tallinn, Estonia
- Plays: Right-handed (two-handed backhand)
- Prize money: $2,512

Singles
- Career record: 0–1 (at ATP Tour level, Grand Slam level, and in Davis Cup)
- Career titles: 0
- Highest ranking: No. 1,699 (17 September 2018)

Doubles
- Career record: 0–0 (at ATP Tour level, Grand Slam level, and in Davis Cup)
- Career titles: 0
- Highest ranking: No. 1,276 (13 August 2018)

Team competitions
- Davis Cup: 0–1
- Last updated on: 11 July 2022.

Kristofer Siimar (born 3 February 1998) is an Estonian tennis player.

Siimar has a career high ATP doubles ranking of 1276 achieved on 13 August 2018.

Siimar represents Estonia at the Davis Cup where he has a W/L record of 0–1. His twin brother Mattias Siimar is also a tennis player.

== Davis Cup ==
=== Participations: (0–1) ===
| Group membership World Group (0–0) WG play-off (0–0) Group I (0–0) Group II (0–1) Group III (0–0) Group IV (0–0) | Matches by surface Hard (0–1) Clay (0–0) Grass (0–0) Carpet (0–0) | Matches by type Singles (0–1) Doubles (0–0) |

- ▲ ▼ indicates the outcome of the Davis Cup match followed by the score, date, place of event, the zonal classification and its phase, and the court surface.

| Rubber outcome | No. | Rubber | Match type (partner if any) | Opponent nation | Opponent player(s) | Score |
▲3–2; 7-9 April 2017; Tere Tennis Centre, Tallinn, Estonia; Europe/Africa Zone Group II relegation play-off; hard (indoor) surface
| Defeat | 1 | V | Singles (dead rubber) | Monaco | Thomas Oger | 4–6, 4–6 |
