= 2016 Australian Open – Boys' singles =

Boys' singles
- 2016 Australian Open

Final
- Champion: (Australia) Oliver Anderson
- Runner-up: (Uzbekistan) Jurabek Karimov
- Score: 6–2, 1–6, 6–1

Events
Singles	men	women		boys	girls
Doubles	men	women	mixed	boys	girls
WC Singles	men	women	quad
WC Doubles	men	women	quad
Legends	men	women	mixed
- Australian Open

Oliver Anderson won the title, defeating Jurabek Karimov in the final, 6–2, 1–6, 6–1.

Roman Safiullin was the defending champion, but was no longer eligible to participate in junior events.

== Seeds ==
1. (Hungary) Máté Valkusz (third round)
2. (Serbia) Miomir Kecmanović (third round)
3. (Greece) Stefanos Tsitsipas (quarterfinals)
4. (Canada) Félix Auger-Aliassime (third round)
5. (South Korea) Chung Yun-seong (semifinals)
6. (Australia) Alex De Minaur (semifinals)
7. (Uzbekistan) Jurabek Karimov (final)
8. (United States) Ulises Blanch (second round)

9. (United Kingdom) Jay Clarke (first round)
10. (Philippines) Alberto Lim (first round)
11. (Argentina) Genaro Alberto Olivieri (second round)
12. (Egypt) Youssef Hossam (third round)
13. (Japan) Yosuke Watanuki (quarterfinals)
14. (France) Ugo Humbert (second round)
15. (Estonia) Kenneth Raisma (quarterfinals)
16. (China) Wu Yibing (first round)

== Draw ==
Key

- Q = Qualifier
- WC = Wild card
- LL = Lucky loser
- Alt = Alternate
- ITF = ITF entry
- PR = Protected ranking
- SR = Special ranking
- SE = Special exempt
- JE = Junior exempt
- JR = Junior Accelerator Programme entrant
- CO = College Accelerator Programme entrant
- NG = Next Gen Accelerator Program entrant
- w/o = Walkover
- r = Retired
- d = Defaulted

=== Finals ===
Quarterfinals
WC	(Australia) Oliver Anderson	3	6	6
WC	(Australia) Max Purcell	6	4	4
15	(Estonia) Kenneth Raisma	3	4
5	(South Korea) Chung Yun-seong	6	6
6	(Australia) Alex De Minaur	6^{3}	7	6
3	(Greece) Stefanos Tsitsipas	7^{7}	5	0
7	(Uzbekistan) Jurabek Karimov	6	6
13	(Japan) Yosuke Watanuki	3	2

Semifinals
WC	(Australia) Oliver Anderson	6	7
5	(South Korea) Chung Yun-seong	3	5
6	(Australia) Alex De Minaur	6	4	3
7	(Uzbekistan) Jurabek Karimov	3	6	6

Final
WC	(Australia) Oliver Anderson	6	1	6
7	(Uzbekistan) Jurabek Karimov	2	6	1

=== Top half ===
==== Section 1 ====
First round
1	(Hungary) Máté Valkusz	6	6
(Italy) Gian Marco Moroni	4	4
(Uzbekistan) Khumoun Sultanov	6	6
(United Kingdom) Ewan Moore	4	2
WC	(Australia) Oliver Anderson	4	6	6
(Slovakia) Lukáš Klein	6	1	4
(Japan) Yunosuke Tanaka	1	2
14	(France) Ugo Humbert	6	6
10	(Philippines) Alberto Lim	4	0
(Spain) Eduard Güell Bartrina	6	6
Q	(Belgium) Seppe Cuypers	4	6^{1}
Q	(Australia) Lucas Vuradin	6	7^{7}
(Japan) Toru Horie	2	2
WC	(Australia) Max Purcell	6	6
(Poland) Kacper Żuk	6^{6}	4
8	(United States) Ulises Blanch	7^{8}	6

Second round
1	(Hungary) M Valkusz	7	0	6
(Uzbekistan) K Sultanov	5	6	4
WC	(Australia) O Anderson	6	7
14	(France) U Humbert	2	5
(Spain) E Güell Bartrina	3	6	6
Q	(Australia) L Vuradin	6	2	1
WC	(Australia) M Purcell	7	7^{8}
8	(United States) U Blanch	5	6^{6}

Third round
1	(Hungary) M Valkusz	4	3
WC	(Australia) O Anderson	6	6
(Spain) E Güell Bartrina	4	2
WC	(Australia) M Purcell	6	6

Quarterfinals
WC	(Australia) O Anderson	3	6	6
WC	(Australia) M Purcell	6	4	4

==== Section 2 ====
First round
4	(Canada) Félix Auger-Aliassime	6	6
Q	(Italy) Andres Gabriel Ciurletti	4	4
WC	(China) Mu Tao	4	6	7
(Israel) Yshai Oliel	6	3	5
WC	(Australia) Adam Walton	2	2
(Russia) Lev Kazakov	6	6
(France) Evan Furness	4	6	4
15	(Estonia) Kenneth Raisma	6	3	6
11	(Argentina) Genaro Alberto Olivieri	7^{7}	6
(France) Geoffrey Blancaneaux	6^{1}	4
WC	(Australia) Scott Jones	2	4
(Chinese Taipei) Wu Tung-lin	6	6
(Czech Republic) Patrik Rikl	6	6
Q	(Japan) Daisuke Sumizawa	2	4
(Australia) Alexei Popyrin	3	2
5	(South Korea) Chung Yun-seong	6	6

Second round
4	(Canada) F Auger-Aliassime	6	6
WC	(China) T Mu	2	1
(Russia) L Kazakov	5	2
15	(Estonia) K Raisma	7	6
11	(Argentina) GA Olivieri	4	6^{5}
(Chinese Taipei) T-l Wu	6	7^{7}
(Czech Republic) P Rikl	7	4	7
5	(South Korea) Y-s Chung	5	6	9

Third round
4	(Canada) F Auger-Aliassime	3	1
15	(Estonia) K Raisma	6	6
(Chinese Taipei) T-l Wu	3	0^{r}
5	(South Korea) Y-s Chung	6	1

Quarterfinals
15	(Estonia) K Raisma	3	4
5	(South Korea) Y-s Chung	6	6

=== Bottom half ===
==== Section 3 ====
First round
6	(Australia) Alex De Minaur	6	6
(Italy) Corrado Summaria	2	3
SE	(France) Elliot Benchetrit	6	6
(Turkey) Ergi Kırkın	2	4
(Poland) Piotr Matuszewski	6	4	7
(Russia) Alexey Aleshchev	4	6	5
(Lithuania) Robertas Vrzesinski	1	3
12	(Egypt) Youssef Hossam	6	6
16	(China) Wu Yibing	4	6	4
SE	(Australia) Blake Ellis	6	2	6
(United States) Liam Caruana	6	7^{7}
Q	(Japan) Rio Noguchi	1	6^{2}
(Romania) Călin Manda	6	7
WC	(Australia) Richard Yang	2	5
Q	(Hungary) Zsombor Piros	4	5
3	(Greece) Stefanos Tsitsipas	6	7

Second round
6	(Australia) A De Minaur	6	7
SE	(France) E Benchetrit	3	5
(Poland) P Matuszewski	1	6^{3}
12	(Egypt) Y Hossam	6	7^{7}
SE	(Australia) B Ellis	6	4	2
(United States) L Caruana	3	6	6
(Romania) C Manda	4	3
3	(Greece) S Tsitsipas	6	6

Third round
6	(Australia) A De Minaur	7	6
12	(Egypt) Y Hossam	5	3
(United States) L Caruana	4	4
3	(Greece) S Tsitsipas	6	6

Quarterfinals
6	(Australia) A De Minaur	6^{3}	7	6
3	(Greece) S Tsitsipas	7^{7}	5	0

==== Section 4 ====
First round
7	(Uzbekistan) Jurabek Karimov	6	6
Q	(United States) Zeke Clark	1	3
WC	(Australia) Nathanael Consalvo	5	3
Q	(Hong Kong) Anthony Jackie Tang	7	6
(South Korea) Oh Chan-yeong	4	7	6
(France) Louis Tessa	6	5	4
(Estonia) Mattias Siimar	6	3	6
9	(United Kingdom) Jay Clarke	4	6	4
13	(Japan) Yosuke Watanuki	6	3	6
(Chinese Taipei) Lo Chien-hsun	2	6	1
(Thailand) Nawakarn Khunjan	1	6^{5}
WC	(Australia) Moerani Bouzige	6	7^{7}
(Canada) Jack Mingjie Lin	6	6
(Germany) Nicola Kuhn	4	3
LL	(Germany) Rudolf Molleker	2	2
2	(Serbia) Miomir Kecmanović	6	6

Second round
7	(Uzbekistan) J Karimov	6	6
Q	(Hong Kong) AJ Tang	4	4
(South Korea) C-y Oh	6	6
(Estonia) M Siimar	4	3
13	(Japan) Y Watanuki	6	6
WC	(Australia) M Bouzige	2	2
(Canada) JM Lin	1	4
2	(Serbia) M Kecmanović	6	6

Third round
7	(Uzbekistan) J Karimov	6	6
(South Korea) C-y Oh	4	2
13	(Japan) Y Watanuki	4	6	8
2	(Serbia) M Kecmanović	6	2	6

Quarterfinals
7	(Uzbekistan) J Karimov	6	6
13	(Japan) Y Watanuki	3	2

== Qualifying ==
=== Seeds ===
1. (United States) Ezekiel Clark (qualified)
2. (Belgium) Seppe Cuypers (qualified)
3. (Hungary) Zsombor Piros (qualified)
4. (Germany) Rudolf Molleker (qualifying competition; lucky loser)
5. (Italy) Andres Gabriel Ciurletti (qualified)
6. (Russia) Mikhail Sokolovskiy (qualifying competition)
7. (Japan) Rio Noguchi (qualified)
8. (Netherlands) Bart Stevens (first round)
9. (Croatia) Karlo Boljat (qualifying competition)
10. (Italy) Riccardo Balzerani (qualifying competition)
11. (Australia) Kody Pearson (first round)
12. (China) Cui Jie (qualifying competition)
13. (Hong Kong) Anthony Jackie Tang (qualified)
14. (Estonia) Kristofer Siimar (qualifying competition)
15. (India) Nikshep Ballekere Ravikumar (first round)
16. (Italy) Giovanni Fonio (qualifying competition)

=== Qualifiers ===
1. (United States) Ezekiel Clark
2. (Belgium) Seppe Cuypers
3. (Hungary) Zsombor Piros
4. (Hong Kong) Anthony Jackie Tang
5. (Italy) Andres Gabriel Ciurletti
6. (Japan) Daisuke Sumizawa
7. (Japan) Rio Noguchi
8. (Australia) Lucas Vuradin

=== Lucky losers ===
1. (Germany) Rudolf Molleker

=== Draw ===
==== First qualifier ====
First round
1	(United States) Ezekiel Clark	6	6
(Australia) Benard Bruno Nkomba	2	2
(Japan) James Kent Trotter	1	6	6^{3}
12	(China) Cui Jie	6	2	7^{7}

Qualifying competition
1	(United States) Ezekiel Clark	6	6
12	(China) Cui Jie	2	1

==== Second qualifier ====
First round
2	(Belgium) Seppe Cuypers	6	6
(Australia) Mayez Jupiter Elrich	4	4
(Australia) Thomas Bosancic	6	6
15	(India) Nikshep Ballekere Ravikumar	1	2

Qualifying competition
2	(Belgium) Seppe Cuypers	6	6
(Australia) Thomas Bosancic	3	3

==== Third qualifier ====
First round
3	(Hungary) Zsombor Piros	6	6
(Australia) Michael Commings	2	0
(Japan) Rimpei Kawakami	2	2
10	(Italy) Riccardo Balzerani	6	6

Qualifying competition
3	(Hungary) Zsombor Piros	6	5	6
10	(Italy) Riccardo Balzerani	3	7	0

==== Fourth qualifier ====
First round
4	(Germany) Rudolf Molleker	6	6
(Australia) Alexander Crnokrak	2	2
(Australia) Chase Ferguson	4	0
13	(Hong Kong) Anthony Jackie Tang	6	6

Qualifying competition
4	(Germany) Rudolf Molleker	6^{2}	1
13	(Hong Kong) Anthony Jackie Tang	7^{7}	6

==== Fifth qualifier ====
First round
5	(Italy) Andres Gabriel Ciurletti	6	6
(Australia) Jesse Delaney	3	1
(Australia) Joshua Charlton	0	4
14	(Estonia) Kristofer Siimar	6	6

Qualifying competition
5	(Italy) Andres Gabriel Ciurletti	6	6
14	(Estonia) Kristofer Siimar	4	3

==== Sixth qualifier ====
First round
6	(Russia) Mikhail Sokolovskiy	6	7^{7}
(India) Alex Solanki	3	6^{5}
(Japan) Daisuke Sumizawa	6	6
11	(Australia) Kody Pearson	4	0

Qualifying competition
6	(Russia) Mikhail Sokolovskiy	6	3	2
(Japan) Daisuke Sumizawa	4	6	6

==== Seventh qualifier ====
First round
7	(Japan) Rio Noguchi	6	6
(Australia) Dimitri Morogiannis	1	0
(Australia) Matthew Dellavedova	2	1
9	(Croatia) Karlo Boljat	6	6

Qualifying competition
7	(Japan) Rio Noguchi	6	6
9	(Croatia) Karlo Boljat	4	2

==== Eighth qualifier ====
First round
8	(Netherlands) Bart Stevens	3	5
(Australia) Lucas Vuradin	6	7
(United States) Lane Leschly	3	1
16	(Italy) Giovanni Fonio	6	6

Qualifying competition
(Australia) Lucas Vuradin	4	6	6
16	(Italy) Giovanni Fonio	6	3	0
