= 2016 Australian Open – Men's doubles =

Tennis tournament

Men's doubles
- 2016 Australian Open

Final
- Champions: (United Kingdom) Jamie Murray (Brazil) Bruno Soares
- Runners-up: (Canada) Daniel Nestor (Czech Republic) Radek Štěpánek
- Score: 2–6, 6–4, 7–5

Details
- Draw: 64
- Seeds: 16

Events
Singles	men	women		boys	girls
Doubles	men	women	mixed	boys	girls
WC Singles	men	women	quad
WC Doubles	men	women	quad
Legends	men	women	mixed
- Australian Open

Simone Bolelli and Fabio Fognini were the defending champions, but lost in the second round to Adrian Mannarino and Lucas Pouille.

Jamie Murray and Bruno Soares won the title, defeating Daniel Nestor and Radek Štěpánek in the final, 2–6, 6–4, 7–5.

Australian Lleyton Hewitt played his final ever professional match in either singles or doubles; partnering Sam Groth, the pair lost to Jack Sock and Vasek Pospisil in the third round.

== Seeds ==
1. (Netherlands) Jean-Julien Rojer / (Romania) Horia Tecău (quarterfinals)
2. (Croatia) Ivan Dodig / (Brazil) Marcelo Melo (third round)
3. (United States) Bob Bryan / (United States) Mike Bryan (third round)
4. (India) Rohan Bopanna / (Romania) Florin Mergea (third round)
5. (Italy) Simone Bolelli / (Italy) Fabio Fognini (second round)
6. (France) Pierre-Hugues Herbert / (France) Nicolas Mahut (second round)
7. (United Kingdom) Jamie Murray / (Brazil) Bruno Soares (champions)
8. (Finland) Henri Kontinen / (Australia) John Peers (second round)

9. (Canada) Vasek Pospisil / (United States) Jack Sock (quarterfinals)
10. (Poland) Łukasz Kubot / (Poland) Marcin Matkowski (second round)
11. (United Kingdom) Dominic Inglot / (Sweden) Robert Lindstedt (third round)
12. (Colombia) Juan Sebastián Cabal / (Colombia) Robert Farah (third round)
13. (South Africa) Raven Klaasen / (United States) Rajeev Ram (quarterfinals)
14. (Philippines) Treat Huey / (Belarus) Max Mirnyi (quarterfinals)
15. (Spain) Feliciano López / (Spain) Marc López (second round)
16. (Uruguay) Pablo Cuevas / (Spain) Marcel Granollers (semifinals)

Click on the seed number of a player to go to their draw section.

== Draw ==
Key

- Q = Qualifier
- WC = Wild card
- LL = Lucky loser
- Alt = Alternate
- ITF = ITF entry
- PR = Protected ranking
- SR = Special ranking
- SE = Special exempt
- JE = Junior exempt
- JR = Junior Accelerator Programme entrant
- CO = College Accelerator Programme entrant
- NG = Next Gen Accelerator Program entrant
- w/o = Walkover
- r = Retired
- d = Defaulted

=== Finals ===
Quarterfinals
1	(Netherlands) Jean-Julien Rojer (Romania) Horia Tecău	6^{5}	7^{7}	4
(France) Adrian Mannarino (France) Lucas Pouille	7^{7}	6^{2}	6
13	(South Africa) Raven Klaasen (United States) Rajeev Ram	7^{7}	4	6^{3}
7	(United Kingdom) Jamie Murray (Brazil) Bruno Soares	6^{3}	6	7^{7}
(Canada) Daniel Nestor (Czech Republic) Radek Štěpánek	6	6
14	(Philippines) Treat Huey (Belarus) Max Mirnyi	4	4
9	(Canada) Vasek Pospisil (United States) Jack Sock	7	1	2
16	(Uruguay) Pablo Cuevas (Spain) Marcel Granollers	5	6	6

Semifinals
(France) Adrian Mannarino (France) Lucas Pouille	3	1
7	(United Kingdom) Jamie Murray (Brazil) Bruno Soares	6	6
(Canada) Daniel Nestor (Czech Republic) Radek Štěpánek	7^{13}	6
16	(Uruguay) Pablo Cuevas (Spain) Marcel Granollers	6^{11}	4

Final
7	(United Kingdom) Jamie Murray (Brazil) Bruno Soares	2	6	7
(Canada) Daniel Nestor (Czech Republic) Radek Štěpánek	6	4	5

=== Top half ===
==== Section 1 ====
First round
1	(Netherlands) J-J Rojer (Romania) H Tecău	7	6
(Slovakia) M Kližan (Ukraine) S Stakhovsky	5	2
(Germany) B Becker (Austria) D Thiem	6	7^{7}
Alt	(Italy) P Lorenzi (Argentina) G Pella	3	6^{4}
(Italy) M Cecchinato (Italy) A Seppi	6	7^{8}
PR	(France) J Benneteau (France) É Roger-Vasselin	3	6^{6}
(Spain) D Muñoz de la Nava (Spain) A Ramos-Viñolas	4	3
15	(Spain) F López (Spain) M López	6	6
12	(Colombia) JS Cabal (Colombia) R Farah	6	6
(France) J Chardy (India) L Paes	3	4
PR	(United States) B Baker (United States) D Kudla	1	2
(Austria) O Marach (France) F Martin	6	6
(France) A Mannarino (France) L Pouille	6	6
(Dominican Republic) V Estrella Burgos (Colombia) S Giraldo	1	3
(Australia) R Junaid (Kazakhstan) M Kukushkin	6^{1}	6	3
5	(Italy) S Bolelli (Italy) F Fognini	7^{7}	3	6

Second round
1	(Netherlands) J-J Rojer (Romania) H Tecău	6	3	6
(Germany) B Becker (Austria) D Thiem	3	6	3
(Italy) M Cecchinato (Italy) A Seppi	1	7^{7}	7
15	(Spain) F López (Spain) M López	6	6^{1}	5
12	(Colombia) JS Cabal (Colombia) R Farah	6	6
(Austria) O Marach (France) F Martin	2	1
(France) A Mannarino (France) L Pouille	7^{7}	6
5	(Italy) S Bolelli (Italy) F Fognini	6^{5}	4

Third round
1	(Netherlands) J-J Rojer (Romania) H Tecău	7^{7}	6
(Italy) M Cecchinato (Italy) A Seppi	6^{0}	3
12	(Colombia) JS Cabal (Colombia) R Farah	3	6^{6}
(France) A Mannarino (France) L Pouille	6	7^{8}

Quarterfinals
1	(Netherlands) J-J Rojer (Romania) H Tecău	6^{5}	7^{7}	4
(France) A Mannarino (France) L Pouille	7^{7}	6^{2}	6

==== Section 2 ====
First round
3	(United States) B Bryan (United States) M Bryan	7	7^{7}
(Australia) C Guccione (Brazil) A Sá	5	6^{4}
WC	(Australia) A Bolt (Australia) A Whittington	6^{4}	6	4
PR	(India) M Bhupathi (Luxembourg) G Müller	7^{7}	3	6
(United States) S Johnson (United States) S Querrey	6	7^{7}
(Czech Republic) L Rosol (Slovakia) I Zelenay	3	6^{3}
(New Zealand) M Daniell (New Zealand) A Sitak	3	6	4
13	(South Africa) R Klaasen (United States) R Ram	6	4	6
11	(United Kingdom) D Inglot (Sweden) R Lindstedt	6	6
(Belarus) S Betov (Russia) T Gabashvili	4	3
(Austria) P Oswald (Canada) A Shamasdin	4	5
(United States) E Butorac (United States) S Lipsky	6	7
(Poland) M Fyrstenberg (Poland) J Janowicz	6	7
(Argentina) F Delbonis (Argentina) G Durán	4	5
(United Kingdom) J Marray (Pakistan) A-u-H Qureshi	3	4
7	(United Kingdom) J Murray (Brazil) B Soares	6	6

Second round
3	(United States) B Bryan (United States) M Bryan	6	6
PR	(India) M Bhupathi (Luxembourg) G Müller	3	2
(United States) S Johnson (United States) S Querrey	6	3	6^{4}
13	(South Africa) R Klaasen (United States) R Ram	3	6	7^{7}
11	(United Kingdom) D Inglot (Sweden) R Lindstedt	7^{7}	6^{5}	6
(United States) E Butorac (United States) S Lipsky	6^{5}	7^{7}	4
(Poland) M Fyrstenberg (Poland) J Janowicz	5	3
7	(United Kingdom) J Murray (Brazil) B Soares	7	6

Third round
3	(United States) B Bryan (United States) M Bryan	6	3	4
13	(South Africa) R Klaasen (United States) R Ram	3	6	6
11	(United Kingdom) D Inglot (Sweden) R Lindstedt	3	4
7	(United Kingdom) J Murray (Brazil) B Soares	6	6

Quarterfinals
13	(South Africa) R Klaasen (United States) R Ram	7^{7}	4	6^{3}
7	(United Kingdom) J Murray (Brazil) B Soares	6^{3}	6	7^{7}

=== Bottom half ===
==== Section 3 ====
First round
6	(France) P-H Herbert (France) N Mahut	6	6
(United States) N Monroe (Chile) H Podlipnik-Castillo	1	4
(Moldova) R Albot (South Korea) H Chung	6	3	4
Alt	(Spain) P Andújar (Spain) P Carreño Busta	3	6	6
WC	(Chinese Taipei) C-p Hsieh (Chinese Taipei) T-h Yang	1	5
(Canada) D Nestor (Czech Republic) R Štěpánek	6	7
(Spain) G García-López (Spain) D Marrero	1	7^{7}	3
10	(Poland) Ł Kubot (Poland) M Matkowski	6	6^{2}	6
14	(Philippines) T Huey (Belarus) M Mirnyi	7^{7}	4	7^{12}
(Belarus) A Bury (Uzbekistan) D Istomin	6^{3}	6	6^{10}
(Brazil) T Bellucci (Brazil) M Demoliner	4	6	7
(Mexico) S González (Austria) J Knowle	6	3	5
WC	(Australia) J Duckworth (Australia) J Millman	6^{4}	6	3
PR	(Czech Republic) L Dlouhý (Czech Republic) J Veselý	7^{7}	2	6
WC	(Australia) O Jasika (Australia) N Kyrgios	5	3
4	(India) R Bopanna (Romania) F Mergea	7	6

Second round
6	(France) P-H Herbert (France) N Mahut	7^{7}	4	1
Alt	(Spain) P Andújar (Spain) P Carreño Busta	6^{4}	6	6
(Canada) D Nestor (Czech Republic) R Štěpánek	7^{7}	6
10	(Poland) Ł Kubot (Poland) M Matkowski	6^{4}	1
14	(Philippines) T Huey (Belarus) M Mirnyi	5	7^{7}	6
(Brazil) T Bellucci (Brazil) M Demoliner	7	6^{2}	4
PR	(Czech Republic) L Dlouhý (Czech Republic) J Veselý	3	2
4	(India) R Bopanna (Romania) F Mergea	6	6

Third round
Alt	(Spain) P Andújar (Spain) P Carreño Busta	7	4	4
(Canada) D Nestor (Czech Republic) R Štěpánek	5	6	6
14	(Philippines) T Huey (Belarus) M Mirnyi	6	6
4	(India) R Bopanna (Romania) F Mergea	4	3

Quarterfinals
(Canada) D Nestor (Czech Republic) R Štěpánek	6	6
14	(Philippines) T Huey (Belarus) M Mirnyi	4	4

==== Section 4 ====
First round
8	(Finland) H Kontinen (Australia) J Peers	6	7
WC	(Australia) L Saville (Australia) J-P Smith	3	5
WC	(Australia) S Groth (Australia) L Hewitt	4	2
(Serbia) D Lajović (Serbia) V Troicki	6	1^{r}
(Netherlands) R Haase (Spain) F Verdasco	6	3	6
(Israel) J Erlich (United Kingdom) C Fleming	4	6	3
(Germany) P Petzschner (Austria) A Peya	6	6^{5}	6^{5}
9	(Canada) V Pospisil (United States) J Sock	1	7^{7}	7^{7}
16	(Uruguay) P Cuevas (Spain) M Granollers	6	6
PR	(Ukraine) A Dolgopolov (Russia) D Tursunov	2	2
(Russia) M Elgin (Netherlands) M Middelkoop	6	2	6
(Argentina) L Mayer (Portugal) J Sousa	3	6	3
(Croatia) M Pavić (New Zealand) M Venus	3	4
WC	(United States) A Krajicek (United States) D Young	6	6
(United Kingdom) A Bedene (Germany) D Brown	3	4
2	(Croatia) I Dodig (Brazil) M Melo	6	6

Second round
8	(Finland) H Kontinen (Australia) J Peers	6	4	4
WC	(Australia) S Groth (Australia) L Hewitt	2	6	6
(Netherlands) R Haase (Spain) F Verdasco
9	(Canada) V Pospisil (United States) J Sock	w/o
16	(Uruguay) P Cuevas (Spain) M Granollers	6	3	6
(Russia) M Elgin (Netherlands) M Middelkoop	4	6	2
WC	(United States) A Krajicek (United States) D Young	2	3
2	(Croatia) I Dodig (Brazil) M Melo	6	6

Third round
WC	(Australia) S Groth (Australia) L Hewitt	4	2
9	(Canada) V Pospisil (United States) J Sock	6	6
16	(Uruguay) P Cuevas (Spain) M Granollers	7^{7}	2	6
2	(Croatia) I Dodig (Brazil) M Melo	6^{3}	6	3

Quarterfinals
9	(Canada) V Pospisil (United States) J Sock	7	1	2
16	(Uruguay) P Cuevas (Spain) M Granollers	5	6	6
