= 2016 Australian Open – Boys' doubles =

Boys' doubles
- 2016 Australian Open

Final
- Champions: (Australia) Alex de Minaur (Australia) Blake Ellis
- Runners-up: (Slovakia) Lukáš Klein (Czech Republic) Patrik Rikl
- Score: 3–6, 7–5, [12–10]

Events
Singles	men	women		boys	girls
Doubles	men	women	mixed	boys	girls
WC Singles	men	women	quad
WC Doubles	men	women	quad
Legends	men	women	mixed
- Australian Open

Alex de Minaur and Blake Ellis won the title, defeating Lukáš Klein and Patrik Rikl in the final, 3–6, 7–5, [12–10]. They saved a championship point in en route to the title.

Jake Delaney and Marc Polmans were the defending champions, but both players were no longer eligible to compete in junior tournaments.

== Seeds ==
1. (South Korea) Chung Yun-seong / (Hungary) Máté Valkusz (second round)
2. (Uzbekistan) Jurabek Karimov / (Greece) Stefanos Tsitsipas (first round)
3. (United Kingdom) Jay Clarke / (Serbia) Miomir Kecmanović (first round)
4. (Egypt) Youssef Hossam / (Philippines) Alberto Lim (second round)
5. (United States) Ulises Blanch / (Italy) Gian Marco Moroni (second round)
6. (France) Geoffrey Blancaneaux / (France) Ugo Humbert (second round)
7. (Canada) Félix Auger-Aliassime / (Canada) Jack Mingjie Lin (first round)
8. (Slovakia) Lukáš Klein / (Czech Republic) Patrik Rikl (final)

== Draw ==
Key

- Q = Qualifier
- WC = Wild card
- LL = Lucky loser
- Alt = Alternate
- ITF = ITF entry
- PR = Protected ranking
- SR = Special ranking
- SE = Special exempt
- JE = Junior exempt
- JR = Junior Accelerator Programme entrant
- CO = College Accelerator Programme entrant
- NG = Next Gen Accelerator Program entrant
- w/o = Walkover
- r = Retired
- d = Defaulted

=== Finals ===
Semifinals
(France) Elliot Benchetrit (France) Evan Furness	6^{2}	6^{4}
8	(Slovakia) Lukáš Klein (Czech Republic) Patrik Rikl	7^{7}	7^{7}
(Australia) Alex de Minaur (Australia) Blake Ellis	6	6
WC	(Australia) Scott Jones (Australia) Max Purcell	2	2

Final
8	(Slovakia) Lukáš Klein (Czech Republic) Patrik Rikl	6	5	[10]
(Australia) Alex de Minaur (Australia) Blake Ellis	3	7	[12]

=== Top half ===
First round
1	(South Korea) Chung Yun-seong (Hungary) Máté Valkusz	6	6
WC	(Australia) Nathanael Consalvo (Australia) Benard Bruno Nkomba	3	1
(France) Elliot Benchetrit (France) Evan Furness	3	6	[10]
(Russia) Alexey Aleshchev (Uzbekistan) Khumoun Sultanov	6	3	[8]
(Belgium) Seppe Cuypers (Netherlands) Bart Stevens	3	6	[7]
(Japan) Rio Noguchi (Japan) Yunosuke Tanaka	6	3	[10]
(Chinese Taipei) Lo Chien-hsun (Japan) Yosuke Watanuki	6^{8}	3
5	(United States) Ulises Blanch (Italy) Gian Marco Moroni	7^{10}	6
3	(United Kingdom) Jay Clarke (Serbia) Miomir Kecmanović	6	6^{4}	[15]
WC	(Australia) Moerani Bouzige (Australia) Kody Pearson	1	7^{7}	[17]
(Russia) Lev Kazakov (Lithuania) Robertas Vrzesinski	7	4	[7]
(Estonia) Kenneth Raisma (Estonia) Mattias Siimar	5	6	[10]
(South Korea) Oh Chan-yeong (Chinese Taipei) Wu Tung-lin	6	6
WC	(Australia) Alexander Crnokrak (Australia) Adam Walton	2	3
(United States) Liam Caruana (Italy) Andres Gabriel Ciurletti	2	4
8	(Slovakia) Lukáš Klein (Czech Republic) Patrik Rikl	6	6

Second round
1	(South Korea) Y-s Chung (Hungary) M Valkusz	4	4
(France) E Benchetrit (France) E Furness	6	6
(Japan) R Noguchi (Japan) Y Tanaka	6	6
5	(United States) U Blanch (Italy) GM Moroni	4	3
WC	(Australia) M Bouzige (Australia) K Pearson	3	1
(Estonia) K Raisma (Estonia) M Siimar	6	6
(South Korea) C-y Oh (Chinese Taipei) T-l Wu	4	4
8	(Slovakia) L Klein (Czech Republic) P Rikl	6	6

Quarterfinals
(France) E Benchetrit (France) E Furness	4	6	[13]
(Japan) R Noguchi (Japan) Y Tanaka	6	1	[11]
(Estonia) K Raisma (Estonia) M Siimar	6^{5}	6^{2}
8	(Slovakia) L Klein (Czech Republic) P Rikl	7^{7}	7^{7}

Semifinals
(France) E Benchetrit (France) E Furness	6^{2}	6^{4}
8	(Slovakia) L Klein (Czech Republic) P Rikl	7^{7}	7^{7}

=== Bottom half ===
First round
7	(Canada) Félix Auger-Aliassime (Canada) Jack Mingjie Lin	3	4
(Romania) Călin Manda (France) Louis Tessa	6	6
(United Kingdom) Ewan Moore (Hungary) Zsombor Piros	3	3
(Australia) Alex de Minaur (Australia) Blake Ellis	6	6
(Japan) Toru Horie (Germany) Nicola Kuhn	2	6	[10]
(Turkey) Ergi Kırkın (Australia) Alexei Popyrin	6	2	[4]
(Germany) Rudolf Molleker (Italy) Corrado Summaria	4	6	[4]
4	(Egypt) Youssef Hossam (Philippines) Alberto Lim	6	3	[10]
6	(France) Geoffrey Blancaneaux (France) Ugo Humbert	6	3	[10]
(Spain) Eduard Güell Bartrina (Argentina) Genaro Alberto Olivieri	1	6	[5]
(Croatia) Karlo Boljat (Hong Kong) Anthony Jackie Tang	3	2
(Poland) Piotr Matuszewski (Poland) Kacper Żuk	6	6
WC	(Australia) Scott Jones (Australia) Max Purcell	5	7^{8}	[10]
(Israel) Yshai Oliel (China) Wu Yibing	7	6^{6}	[8]
(United States) Ezekiel Clark (Japan) Daisuke Sumizawa	6	3	[10]
2	(Uzbekistan) Jurabek Karimov (Greece) Stefanos Tsitsipas	4	6	[6]

Second round
(Romania) C Manda (France) L Tessa	6^{3}	5
(Australia) A De Minaur (Australia) B Ellis	7^{7}	7
(Japan) T Horie (Germany) N Kuhn	6	2	[11]
4	(Egypt) Y Hossam (Philippines) A Lim	4	6	[9]
6	(France) G Blancaneaux (France) U Humbert	4	5
(Poland) P Matuszewski (Poland) K Żuk	6	7
WC	(Australia) S Jones (Australia) M Purcell	6	7^{7}
(United States) E Clark (Japan) D Sumizawa	4	6^{2}

Quarterfinals
(Australia) A De Minaur (Australia) B Ellis	6	6
(Japan) T Horie (Germany) N Kuhn	1	1
(Poland) P Matuszewski (Poland) K Żuk	6^{5}	6	[6]
WC	(Australia) S Jones (Australia) M Purcell	7^{7}	3	[10]

Semifinals
(Australia) A De Minaur (Australia) B Ellis	6	6
WC	(Australia) S Jones (Australia) M Purcell	2	2
