= 2016 Australian Open – Wheelchair men's singles =

Wheelchair men's singles
- 2016 Australian Open

Final
- Champion: (United Kingdom) Gordon Reid
- Runner-up: (Belgium) Joachim Gérard
- Score: 7–6^{(9–7)}, 6–4

Events
Singles	men	women		boys	girls
Doubles	men	women	mixed	boys	girls
WC Singles	men	women	quad
WC Doubles	men	women	quad
Legends	men	women	mixed
- Australian Open

Gordon Reid defeated Joachim Gérard in the final, 7–6^{(9–7)}, 6–4 to win the men's singles wheelchair tennis title at the 2016 Australian Open.

Shingo Kunieda was the three-time defending champion, but was defeated in the quarterfinals by Reid. This was the first time Kunieda lost a match at the Australian Open, going a perfect 26-0 in his first 8 Australian Opens.

== Seeds ==
1. (Japan) Shingo Kunieda (quarterfinals)
2. (France) Stéphane Houdet (semifinals)

== Draw ==
Key

- Q = Qualifier
- WC = Wild card
- LL = Lucky loser
- Alt = Alternate
- ITF = ITF entry
- PR = Protected ranking
- SR = Special ranking
- SE = Special exempt
- JE = Junior exempt
- JR = Junior Accelerator Programme entrant
- CO = College Accelerator Programme entrant
- NG = Next Gen Accelerator Program entrant
- w/o = Walkover
- r = Retired
- d = Defaulted

Quarterfinals
1	(Japan) Shingo Kunieda	3	6^{1}
(United Kingdom) Gordon Reid	6	7^{7}
(Argentina) Gustavo Fernández	6	6
WC	(Australia) Adam Kellerman	2	4
(Belgium) Joachim Gérard	6	6
(Netherlands) Maikel Scheffers	3	2
(France) Nicolas Peifer	4	3
2	(France) Stéphane Houdet	6	6

Semifinals
(United Kingdom) Gordon Reid	6	6^{6}	9
(Argentina) Gustavo Fernández	3	7^{8}	7
(Belgium) Joachim Gérard	3	6	6
2	(France) Stéphane Houdet	6	1	3

Final
(United Kingdom) Gordon Reid	7^{9}	6
(Belgium) Joachim Gérard	6^{7}	4
