= 2016 Australian Open – Wheelchair quad doubles =

Wheelchair quad doubles
- 2016 Australian Open

Final
- Champions: (South Africa) Lucas Sithole (United States) David Wagner
- Runners-up: (Australia) Dylan Alcott (United Kingdom) Andrew Lapthorne
- Score: 6–1, 6–3

Events
Singles	men	women		boys	girls
Doubles	men	women	mixed	boys	girls
WC Singles	men	women	quad
WC Doubles	men	women	quad
Legends	men	women	mixed
- Australian Open

Three-time defending champion David Wagner and his partner Lucas Sithole defeated the other two-time defending champion Andrew Lapthorne and his partner Dylan Alcott in the final, 6–1, 6–3 to win the quad doubles wheelchair tennis title at the 2016 Australian Open.

== Seeds ==
1. (South Africa) Lucas Sithole / (United States) David Wagner (champions)
2. (Australia) Dylan Alcott / (United Kingdom) Andrew Lapthorne (final)

== Draw ==
Key

- Q = Qualifier
- WC = Wild card
- LL = Lucky loser
- Alt = Alternate
- ITF = ITF entry
- PR = Protected ranking
- SR = Special ranking
- SE = Special exempt
- JE = Junior exempt
- JR = Junior Accelerator Programme entrant
- CO = College Accelerator Programme entrant
- NG = Next Gen Accelerator Program entrant
- w/o = Walkover
- r = Retired
- d = Defaulted

Final
1	(South Africa) Lucas Sithole (United States) David Wagner	6	6
2	(Australia) Dylan Alcott (United Kingdom) Andrew Lapthorne	1	3
