= 2016 Australian Open – Wheelchair women's doubles =

Wheelchair women's doubles
- 2016 Australian Open

Final
- Champions: (Netherlands) Marjolein Buis (Japan) Yui Kamiji
- Runners-up: (Netherlands) Jiske Griffioen (Netherlands) Aniek van Koot
- Score: 6–2, 6–2

Events
Singles	men	women		boys	girls
Doubles	men	women	mixed	boys	girls
WC Singles	men	women	quad
WC Doubles	men	women	quad
Legends	men	women	mixed
← 2015 ·	Australian Open	· 2017 →

Two-time defending champion Yui Kamiji and her partner Marjolein Buis defeated Jiske Griffioen and Aniek van Koot in the final, 6–2, 6–2 to win the women's doubles wheelchair tennis title at the 2016 Australian Open.

Kamiji and Jordanne Whiley were the two-time defending champions, but did not compete together. Whiley partnered Lucy Shuker, but was defeated in the semifinals by Griffioen and van Koot.

== Seeds ==
1. (Netherlands) Jiske Griffioen / (Netherlands) Aniek van Koot (finals)
2. (Netherlands) Marjolein Buis / (Japan) Yui Kamiji (champions)

== Draw ==
=== Key ===
- Q = Qualifier
- WC = Wild card
- LL = Lucky loser
- Alt = Alternate
- ITF = ITF entry
- PR = Protected ranking
- SR = Special ranking
- SE = Special exempt
- JE = Junior exempt
- JR = Junior Accelerator Programme entrant
- CO = College Accelerator Programme entrant
- NG = Next Gen Accelerator Program entrant
- w/o = Walkover
- r = Retired
- d = Defaulted

Semifinals
1	(Netherlands) Jiske Griffioen (Netherlands) Aniek van Koot	7^{7}	4	6
(United Kingdom) Lucy Shuker (United Kingdom) Jordanne Whiley	6^{5}	6	3
(Germany) Sabine Ellerbrock (South Africa) Kgothatso Montjane	4	5
2	(Netherlands) Marjolein Buis (Japan) Yui Kamiji	6	7

Final
1	(Netherlands) Jiske Griffioen (Netherlands) Aniek van Koot	2	2
2	(Netherlands) Marjolein Buis (Japan) Yui Kamiji	6	6
