= 2016 Australian Open – Girls' doubles =

Girls' doubles
- 2016 Australian Open

Final
- Champions: (Russia) Anna Kalinskaya (Slovakia) Tereza Mihalíková
- Runners-up: (Ukraine) Dayana Yastremska (Ukraine) Anastasia Zarytska
- Score: 6–1, 6–1

Events
| Singles | men | women | | boys | girls |
| Doubles | men | women | mixed | boys | girls |
| WC Singles | men | women | quad |
| WC Doubles | men | women | quad |
| Legends | men | women | mixed |
- Australian Open

Miriam Kolodziejová and Markéta Vondroušová were the defending champions, however Kolodziejová was no longer eligible to play juniors and Vondroušová chose not to participate.

Anna Kalinskaya and Tereza Mihalíková won the title, defeating Dayana Yastremska and Anastasia Zarytska in the final, 6–1, 6–1.

== Seeds ==
1. (Canada) Bianca Andreescu / (Canada) Charlotte Robillard-Millette (quarterfinals; withdrew)
2. (Russia) Anna Kalinskaya / (Slovakia) Tereza Mihalíková (champions)
3. (Belarus) Vera Lapko / (Canada) Katherine Sebov (first round)
4. (United States) Maria Mateas / (Russia) Anastasia Potapova (second round)
5. (India) Karman Thandi / (India) Pranjala Yadlapalli (quarterfinals)
6. (Ukraine) Dayana Yastremska / (Ukraine) Anastasia Zarytska (final)
7. (Turkey) Berfu Cengiz / (Romania) Ioana Mincă (first round)
8. (Japan) Mayuka Aikawa / (Japan) Chihiro Muramatsu (quarterfinals)

== Draw ==
Key

- Q = Qualifier
- WC = Wild card
- LL = Lucky loser
- Alt = Alternate
- ITF = ITF entry
- PR = Protected ranking
- SR = Special ranking
- SE = Special exempt
- JE = Junior exempt
- JR = Junior Accelerator Programme entrant
- CO = College Accelerator Programme entrant
- NG = Next Gen Accelerator Program entrant
- w/o = Walkover
- r = Retired
- d = Defaulted

=== Finals ===
Semifinals
6 | (Ukraine) Dayana Yastremska (Ukraine) Anastasia Zarytska | 6 | 2 | [10]
(Chinese Taipei) Cho I-hsuan (Japan) Ayumi Miyamoto | 2 | 6 | [5]
(Australia) Jaimee Fourlis (Australia) Maddison Inglis | 1 | 4
2 | (Russia) Anna Kalinskaya (Slovakia) Tereza Mihalíková | 6 | 6

Final
6 | (Ukraine) Dayana Yastremska (Ukraine) Anastasia Zarytska | 1 | 1
2 | (Russia) Anna Kalinskaya (Slovakia) Tereza Mihalíková | 6 | 6

=== Top half ===
First round
1 | (Canada) Bianca Andreescu (Canada) Charlotte Robillard-Millette | 6 | 6
(Greece) Eleni Christofi (New Zealand) Jade Lewis | 4 | 2
(Republic of Ireland) Georgia Drummy (Japan) Ayano Shimizu | 3 | 3
(Australia) Destanee Aiava (Czech Republic) Lucie Kaňková | 6 | 6
(Japan) Naho Sato (Japan) Satoko Sueno | 3 | 1
WC | (Australia) Alexandra Bozovic (Australia) Kaylah McPhee | 6 | 6
(China) Guo Hanyu (Netherlands) Nina Kruijer | 7 | 5 | [7]
6 | (Ukraine) Dayana Yastremska (Ukraine) Anastasia Zarytska | 5 | 7 | [10]
3 | (Belarus) Vera Lapko (Canada) Katherine Sebov | 7^{7} | 4 | [5]
(Chinese Taipei) Cho I-hsuan (Japan) Ayumi Miyamoto | 6^{1} | 6 | [10]
(Romania) Georgia Crăciun (Romania) Oana Gavrilă | 7^{7} | 2 | [11]
(Serbia) Olga Danilović (Slovenia) Kaja Juvan | 6^{3} | 6 | [9]
(Croatia) Lea Bošković (Poland) Daria Kuczer | 4 | 3
(China) Wang Xiyu (China) Zheng Wushuang | 6 | 6
WC | (Australia) Violet Apisah (Australia) Michaela Haet | 3 | 2
8 | (Japan) Mayuka Aikawa (Japan) Chihiro Muramatsu | 6 | 6

Second round
1 | (Canada) B Andreescu (Canada) C Robillard-Millette | 6 | 6^{3} | [10]
(Australia) D Aiava (Czech Republic) L Kaňková | 4 | 7^{7} | [8]
WC | (Australia) A Bozovic (Australia) K McPhee | 3 | 3
6 | (Ukraine) D Yastremska (Ukraine) A Zarytska | 6 | 6
(Chinese Taipei) I-h Cho (Japan) A Miyamoto | 7^{9} | 2 | [10]
(Romania) G Crăciun (Romania) O Gavrilă | 6^{7} | 6 | [8]
(China) X Wang (China) W Zheng | 6 | 2 | [7]
8 | (Japan) M Aikawa (Japan) C Muramatsu | 2 | 6 | [10]

Quarterfinals
1 | (Canada) B Andreescu (Canada) C Robillard-Millette
6 | (Ukraine) D Yastremska (Ukraine) A Zarytska | w/o
(Chinese Taipei) I-h Cho (Japan) A Miyamoto | 6 | 6
8 | (Japan) M Aikawa (Japan) C Muramatsu | 1 | 4

Semifinals
6 | (Ukraine) D Yastremska (Ukraine) A Zarytska | 6 | 2 | [10]
(Chinese Taipei) I-h Cho (Japan) A Miyamoto | 2 | 6 | [5]

=== Bottom half ===
First round
5 | (India) Karman Thandi (India) Pranjala Yadlapalli | 6 | 6
WC | (Australia) Petra Hule (Australia) Selina Turulja | 4 | 3
(China) Cao Siqi (China) Ren Jiaqi | 6 | 6
(Italy) Ludmilla Samsonova (Italy) Lucrezia Stefanini | 1 | 1
(Australia) Jaimee Fourlis (Australia) Maddison Inglis | 6 | 6
(Japan) Haruna Arakawa (Japan) Mai Hontama | 4 | 0
(Belgium) Lara Salden (Netherlands) Phillis Vanenburg | 1 | 2
4 | (United States) Maria Mateas (Russia) Anastasia Potapova | 6 | 6
7 | (Turkey) Berfu Cengiz (Romania) Ioana Mincă | 3 | 2
(Austria) Mira Antonitsch (Hungary) Panna Udvardy | 6 | 6
(Spain) Cristina Bucșa (Spain) Eva Guerrero Álvarez | 6 | 6
(United Kingdom) Ema Lazic (Russia) Elena Rybakina | 2 | 4
(South Africa) Lee Barnard (South Africa) Zani Barnard | 3 | 6 | [6]
WC | (Australia) Baijing Lin (Australia) Kaitlin Staines | 6 | 4 | [10]
(China) Nima Zhuoma (India) Mihika Yadav | 3 | 0
2 | (Russia) Anna Kalinskaya (Slovakia) Tereza Mihalíková | 6 | 6

Second round
5 | (India) K Thandi (India) P Yadlapalli | 6 | 4 | [10]
(China) S Cao (China) J Ren | 4 | 6 | [2]
(Australia) J Fourlis (Australia) M Inglis | 6 | 6
4 | (United States) M Mateas (Russia) A Potapova | 2 | 2
(Austria) M Antonitsch (Hungary) P Udvardy | 7^{7} | 6
(Spain) C Bucșa (Spain) E Guerrero Álvarez | 6^{2} | 1
WC | (Australia) B Lin (Australia) K Staines | 2 | 6^{5}
2 | (Russia) A Kalinskaya (Slovakia) T Mihalíková | 6 | 7^{7}

Quarterfinals
5 | (India) K Thandi (India) P Yadlapalli | 6^{3} | 5
(Australia) J Fourlis (Australia) M Inglis | 7^{7} | 7
(Austria) M Antonitsch (Hungary) P Udvardy | 2 | 5
2 | (Russia) A Kalinskaya (Slovakia) T Mihalíková | 6 | 7

Semifinals
(Australia) J Fourlis (Australia) M Inglis | 1 | 4
2 | (Russia) A Kalinskaya (Slovakia) T Mihalíková | 6 | 6
