= 2016 Australian Open – Men's singles =

Men's singles
- 2016 Australian Open

Final
- Champion: (Serbia) Novak Djokovic
- Runner-up: (United Kingdom) Andy Murray
- Score: 6–1, 7–5, 7–6^{(7–3)}

Details
- Draw: 128 (16Q / 8WC)
- Seeds: 32

Events
Singles	men	women		boys	girls
Doubles	men	women	mixed	boys	girls
WC Singles	men	women	quad
WC Doubles	men	women	quad
Legends	men	women	mixed
- Australian Open

Defending champion Novak Djokovic defeated Andy Murray in a rematch of the previous year's final, 6–1, 7–5, 7–6^{(7–3)} to win the men's singles tennis title at the 2016 Australian Open. It was his record-equaling sixth Australian Open men's singles title (tying Roy Emerson) and eleventh major title overall. This was the fourth Australian Open final between the pair. Murray was the second man in the Open Era to lose five finals at the same major (after Ivan Lendl at the US Open), and is the only one to have the distinction without having won the title.

This marked the final professional appearance of former world No. 1, two-time major champion and 2005 finalist Lleyton Hewitt; he lost to David Ferrer in the second round.

This marked the 65th consecutive major appearance for Federer, setting a new record after surpassing Wayne Ferreira’s previous record of 54 consecutive major appearances (Feliciano López later broke Federer’s record and set the current record at 79 consecutive major appearances from 2002 to 2022).

== Seeds ==
1. (Serbia) Novak Djokovic (champion)
2. (United Kingdom) Andy Murray (final)
3. (Switzerland) Roger Federer (semifinals)
4. (Switzerland) Stan Wawrinka (fourth round)
5. (Spain) Rafael Nadal (first round)
6. (Czech Republic) Tomáš Berdych (quarterfinals)
7. (Japan) Kei Nishikori (quarterfinals)
8. (Spain) David Ferrer (quarterfinals)
9. (France) Jo-Wilfried Tsonga (fourth round)
10. (United States) John Isner (fourth round)
11. (South Africa) Kevin Anderson (first round, retired)
12. (Croatia) Marin Čilić (third round)
13. (Canada) Milos Raonic (semifinals)
14. (France) Gilles Simon (fourth round)
15. (Belgium) David Goffin (fourth round)
16. (Australia) Bernard Tomic (fourth round)

17. (France) Benoît Paire (first round)
18. (Spain) Feliciano López (third round)
19. (Austria) Dominic Thiem (third round)
20. (Italy) Fabio Fognini (first round)
21. (Serbia) Viktor Troicki (third round)
22. (Croatia) Ivo Karlović (first round, retired)
23. (France) Gaël Monfils (quarterfinals)
24. (Spain) Roberto Bautista Agut (fourth round)
25. (United States) Jack Sock (second round)
26. (Spain) Guillermo García-López (third round)
27. (Bulgaria) Grigor Dimitrov (third round)
28. (Italy) Andreas Seppi (third round)
29. (Australia) Nick Kyrgios (third round)
30. (France) Jérémy Chardy (second round)
31. (United States) Steve Johnson (third round)
32. (Portugal) João Sousa (third round)

Click on the seed number of a player to go to their draw section.

== Draw ==
Key

- Q = Qualifier
- WC = Wild card
- LL = Lucky loser
- Alt = Alternate
- ITF = ITF entry
- PR = Protected ranking
- SR = Special ranking
- SE = Special exempt
- JE = Junior exempt
- JR = Junior Accelerator Programme entrant
- CO = College Accelerator Programme entrant
- NG = Next Gen Accelerator Program entrant
- w/o = Walkover
- r = Retired
- d = Defaulted

=== Finals ===
Quarterfinals
1	(Serbia) Novak Djokovic	6	6	6
7	(Japan) Kei Nishikori	3	2	4
3	(Switzerland) Roger Federer	7^{7}	6	6
6	(Czech Republic) Tomáš Berdych	6^{4}	2	4
23	(France) Gaël Monfils	3	6	3	4
13	(Canada) Milos Raonic	6	3	6	6
8	(Spain) David Ferrer	3	7^{7}	2	3
2	(United Kingdom) Andy Murray	6	6^{5}	6	6

Semifinals
1	(Serbia) Novak Djokovic	6	6	3	6
3	(Switzerland) Roger Federer	1	2	6	3
13	(Canada) Milos Raonic	6	5	7^{7}	4	2
2	(United Kingdom) Andy Murray	4	7	6^{4}	6	6

Final
1	(Serbia) Novak Djokovic	6	7	7^{7}
2	(United Kingdom) Andy Murray	1	5	6^{3}

=== Top half ===
==== Section 1 ====
First round
1	(Serbia) N Djokovic	6	6	6
(South Korea) H Chung	3	2	4
WC	(France) Q Halys	6	6^{4}	6	7
(Croatia) I Dodig	4	7^{7}	4	5
(Serbia) F Krajinović	2	1	0^{r}
(United States) D Kudla	6	6	0
(Russia) T Gabashvili	6	6^{4}	4	6^{10}
28	(Italy) A Seppi	3	7^{7}	6	7^{12}
22	(Croatia) I Karlović	6^{4}	4	1^{r}
(Argentina) F Delbonis	7^{7}	6	2
(Czech Republic) J Veselý	6^{8}	6	6	4	4
Q	(Argentina) R Olivo	7^{10}	2	1	6	6
(Russia) E Donskoy	6	3	6	6
(Spain) Í Cervantes	4	6	1	4
(Canada) V Pospisil	7^{7}	3	2	4
14	(France) G Simon	6^{4}	6	6	6

Second round
1	(Serbia) N Djokovic	6	6	7^{7}
WC	(France) Q Halys	1	2	6^{3}
(United States) D Kudla	5	4	4
28	(Italy) A Seppi	7	6	6
(Argentina) F Delbonis	7^{7}	3	6^{3}	7	6
Q	(Argentina) R Olivo	6^{5}	6	7^{7}	5	2
(Russia) E Donskoy	3	7	6^{1}	6	5
14	(France) G Simon	6	5	7^{7}	4	7

Third round
1	(Serbia) N Djokovic	6	7	7^{8}
28	(Italy) A Seppi	1	5	6^{6}
(Argentina) F Delbonis	3	2	1
14	(France) G Simon	6	6	6

Fourth round
1	(Serbia) N Djokovic	6	6^{1}	6	4	6
14	(France) G Simon	3	7^{7}	4	6	3

==== Section 2 ====
First round
9	(France) J-W Tsonga	6	4	6	6
(Cyprus) M Baghdatis	4	6	4	2
WC	(Australia) O Jasika	6	3	6	6
(Ukraine) I Marchenko	4	6	0	4
(Spain) P Andújar	7	4	6^{5}	2
Q	(France) P-H Herbert	5	6	7^{7}	6
WC	(United States) N Rubin	7^{7}	7^{8}	7^{7}
17	(France) B Paire	6^{4}	6^{6}	6^{5}
26	(Spain) G García-López	6	6	6
(France) P-H Mathieu	4	4	4
(Dominican Republic) V Estrella Burgos	4	6^{1}	6	2
Q	(Germany) D Brands	6	7^{7}	4	6
(United States) A Krajicek	6	6	6
Q	(China) D Wu	4	1	3
(Germany) P Kohlschreiber	4	3	3
7	(Japan) K Nishikori	6	6	6

Second round
9	(France) J-W Tsonga	7	6	6
WC	(Australia) O Jasika	5	1	4
Q	(France) P-H Herbert	6	6	6
WC	(United States) N Rubin	3	4	0
26	(Spain) G García-López	4	6	7^{7}	6
Q	(Germany) D Brands	6	1	6^{0}	3
(United States) A Krajicek	3	6^{5}	3
7	(Japan) K Nishikori	6	7^{7}	6

Third round
9	(France) J-W Tsonga	6	7^{9}	7^{7}
Q	(France) P-H Herbert	4	6^{7}	6^{4}
26	(Spain) G García-López	5	6	3	4
7	(Japan) K Nishikori	7	2	6	6

Fourth round
9	(France) J-W Tsonga	4	2	4
7	(Japan) K Nishikori	6	6	6

==== Section 3 ====
First round
3	(Switzerland) R Federer	6	6	6
(Georgia (country)) N Basilashvili	2	1	2
(Lithuania) R Berankis	1	6	4	2
(Ukraine) A Dolgopolov	6	3	6	6
Q	(Slovakia) J Kovalík	4	6^{1}	5
Q	(Argentina) M Trungelliti	6	7^{7}	7
(Italy) P Lorenzi	3	6^{8}	3
27	(Bulgaria) G Dimitrov	6	7^{10}	6
19	(Austria) D Thiem	6	7^{8}	4	7^{7}
(Argentina) L Mayer	2	6^{6}	6	6^{0}
PR	(France) J Benneteau	3	7^{7}	3	6^{1}
(Spain) N Almagro	6	6^{5}	6	7^{7}
(United Kingdom) K Edmund	6	6^{4}	6	3	1
(Bosnia and Herzegovina) D Džumhur	1	7^{7}	4	6	6
(Ukraine) S Stakhovsky	6	3	4	4
15	(Belgium) D Goffin	3	6	6	6

Second round
3	(Switzerland) R Federer	6	7	6
(Ukraine) A Dolgopolov	3	5	1
Q	(Argentina) M Trungelliti	3	6	2	5
27	(Bulgaria) G Dimitrov	6	4	6	7
19	(Austria) D Thiem	6	6	6
(Spain) N Almagro	3	1	3
(Bosnia and Herzegovina) D Džumhur	4	6	4	2
15	(Belgium) D Goffin	6	0	6	6

Third round
3	(Switzerland) R Federer	6	3	6	6
27	(Bulgaria) G Dimitrov	4	6	1	4
19	(Austria) D Thiem	1	6	6^{2}	5
15	(Belgium) D Goffin	6	3	7^{7}	7

Fourth round
3	(Switzerland) R Federer	6	6	6
15	(Belgium) D Goffin	2	1	4

==== Section 4 ====
First round
12	(Croatia) M Čilić	6^{4}	7	6	6
(Netherlands) T de Bakker	7^{7}	5	2	4
(Spain) A Ramos-Viñolas	6	6	6
(Croatia) B Ćorić	2	2	3
(Serbia) D Lajović	6^{5}	4	6	6	0
(United States) S Querrey	7^{7}	6	4	2	0^{r}
(Slovakia) M Kližan	2	3	6	6	2
24	(Spain) R Bautista Agut	6	6	4	2	6
29	(Australia) N Kyrgios	6	7	6
(Spain) P Carreño Busta	2	5	2
WC	(Japan) Y Nishioka	6^{5}	1	4
(Uruguay) P Cuevas	7^{7}	6	6
(Netherlands) R Haase	6^{3}	4	4
Q	(Bosnia and Herzegovina) M Bašić	7^{7}	6	6
(India) Y Bhambri	5	1	2
6	(Czech Republic) T Berdych	7	6	6

Second round
12	(Croatia) M Čilić	6	6	7^{7}
(Spain) A Ramos-Viñolas	4	3	6^{4}
(Serbia) D Lajović	6	2	6	2	1
24	(Spain) R Bautista Agut	4	6	4	6	6
29	(Australia) N Kyrgios	6	7	7^{7}
(Uruguay) P Cuevas	4	5	6^{2}
Q	(Bosnia and Herzegovina) M Bašić	4	0	3
6	(Czech Republic) T Berdych	6	6	6

Third round
12	(Croatia) M Čilić	4	6^{5}	5
24	(Spain) R Bautista Agut	6	7^{7}	7
29	(Australia) N Kyrgios	3	4	6	4
6	(Czech Republic) T Berdych	6	6	1	6

Fourth round
24	(Spain) R Bautista Agut	6	4	3	6	3
6	(Czech Republic) T Berdych	4	6	6	1	6

=== Bottom half ===
==== Section 5 ====
First round
5	(Spain) R Nadal	6^{6}	6	6	6^{4}	2
(Spain) F Verdasco	7^{8}	4	3	7^{7}	6
(Germany) B Becker	1	3	6	2
(Israel) D Sela	6	6	2	6
Q	(United States) R Harrison	5	4	4
(Russia) A Kuznetsov	7	6	6
(Latvia) E Gulbis	5	6	7^{7}	3	11
30	(France) J Chardy	7	2	6^{5}	6	13
23	(France) G Monfils	6	6	6
Q	(Japan) Y Sugita	1	3	2
(Italy) M Cecchinato	6	2	2	2
(France) N Mahut	4	6	6	6
Q	(France) S Robert	6	6	6
LL	(United States) B Fratangelo	2	2	2
(United States) R Ram	7^{7}	6^{4}	6	3
11	(South Africa) K Anderson	6^{4}	7^{7}	3	0^{r}

Second round
(Spain) F Verdasco	6	3	3	6^{4}
(Israel) D Sela	4	6	6	7^{7}
(Russia) A Kuznetsov	6	7^{7}	7^{7}
30	(France) J Chardy	4	6^{5}	6^{5}
23	(France) G Monfils	7	6	6
(France) N Mahut	5	4	1
Q	(France) S Robert	6	6^{6}	4	7	7
(United States) R Ram	1	7^{8}	6	5	5

Third round
(Israel) D Sela	5	6	1	6^{4}
(Russia) A Kuznetsov	7	3	6	7^{7}
23	(France) G Monfils	7	6	6
Q	(France) S Robert	5	3	2

Fourth round
(Russia) A Kuznetsov	5	6	3	6^{4}
23	(France) G Monfils	7	3	6	7^{7}

==== Section 6 ====
First round
13	(Canada) M Raonic	6	6	6
(France) L Pouille	1	4	4
(Tunisia) M Jaziri	5	6	6	6^{7}	6
(Spain) T Robredo	7	3	4	7^{9}	8
(Spain) D Gimeno-Traver	1	6	3	2
Q	(United States) T Smyczek	6	3	6	6
(Spain) D Muñoz de la Nava	6	6	1	6^{4}	3
21	(Serbia) V Troicki	4	4	6	7^{7}	6
25	(United States) J Sock	6	3	0	6	6
Q	(United States) T Fritz	4	6	6	3	4
(Japan) T Daniel	6^{2}	5	7	7^{7}	1
(Czech Republic) L Rosol	7^{7}	7	5	6^{5}	6
Q	(Japan) T Ito	4	3	7^{7}	2
Q	(Czech Republic) R Štěpánek	6	6	6^{5}	6
PR	(Russia) D Tursunov	6^{2}	3	0^{r}
4	(Switzerland) S Wawrinka	7^{7}	6	0

Second round
13	(Canada) M Raonic	7^{8}	7^{7}	7
(Spain) T Robredo	6^{6}	6^{5}	5
Q	(United States) T Smyczek	4	6^{5}	6^{4}
21	(Serbia) V Troicki	6	7^{7}	7^{7}
25	(United States) J Sock	6^{6}	6^{5}	3
(Czech Republic) L Rosol	7^{8}	7^{7}	6
Q	(Czech Republic) R Štěpánek	2	3	4
4	(Switzerland) S Wawrinka	6	6	6

Third round
13	(Canada) M Raonic	6	6	6
21	(Serbia) V Troicki	2	3	4
(Czech Republic) L Rosol	2	3	6^{3}
4	(Switzerland) S Wawrinka	6	6	7^{7}

Fourth round
13	(Canada) M Raonic	6	6	5	4	6
4	(Switzerland) S Wawrinka	4	3	7	6	3

==== Section 7 ====
First round
8	(Spain) D Ferrer	6	6	6
Q	(Germany) P Gojowczyk	4	4	2
WC	(Australia) J Duckworth	6^{5}	2	4
WC	(Australia) L Hewitt	7^{7}	6	6
(Brazil) T Bellucci	6	6	6
WC	(Australia) J Thompson	2	3	2
(United Kingdom) A Bedene	3	4	6^{3}
31	(United States) S Johnson	6	6	7^{7}
18	(Spain) F López	6	6	6
Q	(United Kingdom) D Evans	1	0	4
(Belgium) S Darcis	6	6	3	5	1
(Argentina) G Pella	2	3	6	7	6
WC	(Australia) M Ebden	2	6	1	4
(Spain) M Granollers	6	4	6	6
(Poland) J Janowicz	3	6^{7}	3
10	(United States) J Isner	6	7^{9}	6

Second round
8	(Spain) D Ferrer	6	6	6
WC	(Australia) L Hewitt	2	4	4
(Brazil) T Bellucci	3	2	2
31	(United States) S Johnson	6	6	6
18	(Spain) F López	7^{7}	6^{4}	7^{7}	6^{8}	6
(Argentina) G Pella	6^{2}	7^{7}	6^{3}	7^{10}	4
(Spain) M Granollers	3	6^{6}	6^{2}
10	(United States) J Isner	6	7^{8}	7^{7}

Third round
8	(Spain) D Ferrer	6	6	6
31	(United States) S Johnson	1	4	4
18	(Spain) F López	7^{10}	6^{5}	2	4
10	(United States) J Isner	6^{8}	7^{7}	6	6

Fourth round
8	(Spain) D Ferrer	6	6	7
10	(United States) J Isner	4	4	5

==== Section 8 ====
First round
16	(Australia) B Tomic	6^{4}	6	6	6
(Uzbekistan) D Istomin	7^{7}	4	4	4
(Italy) S Bolelli	7^{8}	7^{7}	6^{2}	7^{7}
PR	(United States) B Baker	6^{6}	6^{3}	7^{7}	6^{5}
(Australia) J Millman	3	5	7^{7}	5
(Argentina) D Schwartzman	6	7	6^{2}	0^{r}
(Luxembourg) G Müller	7^{8}	7^{9}	6^{5}	7^{7}
20	(Italy) F Fognini	6^{6}	6^{7}	7^{7}	6^{1}
32	(Portugal) J Sousa	6	6	6
(Kazakhstan) M Kukushkin	3	4	3
(Colombia) S Giraldo	6	1	6	6
(United States) D Young	4	6	3	2
(France) A Mannarino	6^{6}	4	6	3
(Australia) S Groth	7^{8}	6	3	6
(Germany) A Zverev	1	2	3
2	(United Kingdom) A Murray	6	6	6

Second round
16	(Australia) B Tomic	6	6	6^{5}	7
(Italy) S Bolelli	4	2	7^{7}	5
(Australia) J Millman	4	6	6	4	7
(Luxembourg) G Müller	6	4	2	6	5
32	(Portugal) J Sousa	6	7	3	6
(Colombia) S Giraldo	3	5	6	1
(Australia) S Groth	0	4	1
2	(United Kingdom) A Murray	6	6	6

Third round
16	(Australia) B Tomic	6	7^{7}	6
(Australia) J Millman	4	6^{4}	2
32	(Portugal) J Sousa	2	6	2	2
2	(United Kingdom) A Murray	6	3	6	6

Fourth round
16	(Australia) B Tomic	4	4	6^{4}
2	(United Kingdom) A Murray	6	6	7^{7}

Preceded by 2015 US Open – Men's singles	Grand Slam men's singles	Succeeded by 2016 French Open – Men's singles
