= 2016 Australian Open – Men's legends' doubles =

Men's legends' doubles
- 2016 Australian Open

Final
- Champions: (Sweden) Jonas Björkman (Sweden) Thomas Johansson
- Runners-up: (Sweden) Thomas Enqvist (Sweden) Magnus Norman
- Score: 4–3^{(5–4)}, 1–4, 4–3^{(5–3)}

Events
Singles	men	women		boys	girls
Doubles	men	women	mixed	boys	girls
WC Singles	men	women	quad
WC Doubles	men	women	quad
Legends	men	women	mixed
← 2015 ·	Australian Open	· 2017 →

Jonas Björkman and Thomas Johansson won the title, defeating Thomas Enqvist and Magnus Norman in the final, 4–3^{(5–4)}, 1–4, 4–3^{(5–3)}.

== Draw ==
=== Key ===
- Q = Qualifier
- WC = Wild card
- LL = Lucky loser
- Alt = Alternate
- ITF = ITF entry
- PR = Protected ranking
- SR = Special ranking
- SE = Special exempt
- JE = Junior exempt
- JR = Junior Accelerator Programme entrant
- CO = College Accelerator Programme entrant
- NG = Next Gen Accelerator Program entrant
- w/o = Walkover
- r = Retired
- d = Defaulted

=== Finals ===
Final
(Sweden) Jonas Björkman (Sweden) Thomas Johansson	4^{5}	1	4^{5}
(Sweden) Thomas Enqvist (Sweden) Magnus Norman	3^{4}	4	3^{3}

=== Newcombe group ===
	(Sweden) J Björkman (Sweden) T Johansson	(France) H Leconte (Australia) M Philippoussis	(South Africa) W Ferreira (Sweden) M Wilander	(Australia) W Arthurs (United States) M Chang	RR W–L	Set W–L	Game W–L	Standings
(Sweden) Jonas Björkman (Sweden) Thomas Johansson		4–3^{(5–2)}, 4–2	2–4, 4–2, 4–2	3–4^{(3–5)}, 4–3^{(5–2)}, 4–3^{(5–4)}	3–0	6–2	29–23	1
(France) Henri Leconte (Australia) Mark Philippoussis	3–4^{(2–5)}, 2–4		4–1, 4–2	4–2, 4–1	2–1	4–2	21–14	2
(South Africa) Wayne Ferreira (Sweden) Mats Wilander	4–2, 2–4, 2–4	1–4, 2–4		4–3^{(5–3)}, 2–4, 4–3^{(5–4)}	1–2	3–5	21–28	3
(Australia) Wayne Arthurs (United States) Michael Chang	4–3^{(5–3)}, 3–4^{(2–5)}, 3–4^{(4–5)}	2–4, 1–4	3–4^{(3–5)}, 4–2, 3–4^{(4–5)}		0–3	2–6	23–29	4

Standings are determined by: 1. number of wins; 2. number of matches; 3. in two-players-ties, head-to-head records; 4. in three-players-ties, percentage of sets won, or of games won; 5. steering-committee decision.

=== Roche group ===
	(Australia) P Cash (Croatia) G Ivanišević	(Sweden) T Enqvist (Sweden) M Norman	(Iran) M Bahrami (France) G Forget	(Australia) Woodbridge (Australia) Woodforde	RR W–L	Set W–L	Game W–L	Standings
(Australia) Pat Cash (Croatia) Goran Ivanišević		3–4^{(4–5)}, 4–1, 2–4	4–2, 3–4^{(4–5)}, 1–4	2–4, 2–4	0–3	2–6	21–27	4
(Sweden) Thomas Enqvist (Sweden) Magnus Norman	4–3^{(5–4)}, 1–4, 4–2		4–3^{(5–4)}, 3–4^{(3–5)}, 4–3^{(5–4)}	1–4, 2–4	2–1	4–4	23–27	1
(Iran) Mansour Bahrami (France) Guy Forget	2–4, 4–3^{(5–4)}, 4–1	3–4^{(4–5)}, 4–3^{(5–3)}, 3–4^{(4–5)}		not played	1–1	3–3	20–19	3
(Australia) Todd Woodbridge (Australia) Mark Woodforde	4–2, 4–2	4–1, 4–2	not played		2–0	4–0	16–7	2

Standings are determined by: 1. number of wins; 2. number of matches; 3. in two-players-ties, head-to-head records; 4. in three-players-ties, percentage of sets won, or of games won; 5. steering-committee decision.
