= 2016 Australian Open – Wheelchair quad singles =

Wheelchair quad singles
- 2016 Australian Open

Final
- Champion: (Australia) Dylan Alcott
- Runner-up: (United States) David Wagner
- Score: 6–2, 6–2

Events
Singles	men	women		boys	girls
Doubles	men	women	mixed	boys	girls
WC Singles	men	women	quad
WC Doubles	men	women	quad
Legends	men	women	mixed
- Australian Open

Defending champion Dylan Alcott defeated David Wagner in the final, 6–2, 6–2 to win the quad singles wheelchair tennis title at the 2016 Australian Open.

== Draw ==
Key

- Q = Qualifier
- WC = Wild card
- LL = Lucky loser
- Alt = Alternate
- ITF = ITF entry
- PR = Protected ranking
- SR = Special ranking
- SE = Special exempt
- JE = Junior exempt
- JR = Junior Accelerator Programme entrant
- CO = College Accelerator Programme entrant
- NG = Next Gen Accelerator Program entrant
- w/o = Walkover
- r = Retired
- d = Defaulted

=== Final ===
Final
(Australia) Dylan Alcott	6	6
(United States) David Wagner	2	2

=== Round robin ===
	(Australia) Alcott	(United Kingdom) Lapthorne	(South Africa) Sithole	(United States) Wagner	RR; W–L	Set; W–L	Game; W–L	Standings
(Australia) Dylan Alcott		6–0, 6–4	6–4, 5–7, 6–3	7–5, 6–1	3–0	6–1	42–24	1
(United Kingdom) Andrew Lapthorne	0–6, 4–6		6–2, 1–6, 0–6	6–2, 2–6, 6–4	1–2	3–5	25–38	4
(South Africa) Lucas Sithole	4–6, 7–5, 3–6	2–6, 6–1, 6–0		2–6, 3–6	1–2	3–5	33–36	3
(United States) David Wagner	5–7, 1–6	2–6, 6–2, 4–6	6–2, 6–3		1–2	3–4	30–32	2

Standings are determined by: 1. number of wins; 2. number of matches; 3. in two-players-ties, head-to-head records; 4. in three-players-ties, percentage of sets won, or of games won; 5. steering-committee decision.
