= 2016 Australian Open – Women's doubles =

Women's doubles
- 2016 Australian Open

Final
- Champions: (Switzerland) Martina Hingis (India) Sania Mirza
- Runners-up: (Czech Republic) Andrea Hlaváčková (Czech Republic) Lucie Hradecká
- Score: 7–6^{(7–1)}, 6–3

Details
- Draw: 64
- Seeds: 16

Events
Singles	men	women		boys	girls
Doubles	men	women	mixed	boys	girls
WC Singles	men	women	quad
WC Doubles	men	women	quad
Legends	men	women	mixed
- Australian Open

Top seeds Martina Hingis and Sania Mirza defeated Andrea Hlaváčková and Lucie Hradecká in the final, 7–6^{(7–1)}, 6–3, to win the women's doubles tennis title at the 2016 Australian Open.

Bethanie Mattek-Sands and Lucie Šafářová were the defending champions, but Šafářová withdrew before the tournament due to a bacterial infection. Mattek-Sands played alongside Sabine Lisicki, but lost in the second round to Anastasia and Arina Rodionova.

== Seeds ==
1. (Switzerland) Martina Hingis / (India) Sania Mirza (champions)
2. (Chinese Taipei) Chan Hao-ching / (Chinese Taipei) Chan Yung-jan (quarterfinals)
3. (France) Caroline Garcia / (France) Kristina Mladenovic (third round)
4. (Hungary) Tímea Babos / (Slovenia) Katarina Srebotnik (second round)
5. (Russia) Anastasia Pavlyuchenkova / (Russia) Elena Vesnina (third round)
6. (United States) Raquel Atawo / (United States) Abigail Spears (second round)
7. (Czech Republic) Andrea Hlaváčková / (Czech Republic) Lucie Hradecká (finals)
8. (Spain) Lara Arruabarrena / (Slovenia) Andreja Klepač (first round)

9. (Romania) Irina-Camelia Begu / (Romania) Monica Niculescu (first round)
10. (Spain) Anabel Medina Garrigues / (Spain) Arantxa Parra Santonja (third round)
11. (Kazakhstan) Yaroslava Shvedova / (Australia) Samantha Stosur (second round)
12. (Germany) Anna-Lena Grönefeld / (United States) CoCo Vandeweghe (quarterfinals)
13. (Germany) Julia Görges / (Czech Republic) Karolína Plíšková (semifinals)
14. (Netherlands) Kiki Bertens / (Sweden) Johanna Larsson (first round)
15. (China) Xu Yifan / (China) Zheng Saisai (semifinals)
16. (Canada) Gabriela Dabrowski / (Poland) Alicja Rosolska (first round)

Click on the seed number of a player to go to their draw section.

== Draw ==
Key

- Q = Qualifier
- WC = Wild card
- LL = Lucky loser
- Alt = Alternate
- ITF = ITF entry
- PR = Protected ranking
- SR = Special ranking
- SE = Special exempt
- JE = Junior exempt
- JR = Junior Accelerator Programme entrant
- CO = College Accelerator Programme entrant
- NG = Next Gen Accelerator Program entrant
- w/o = Walkover
- r = Retired
- d = Defaulted

=== Finals ===
Quarterfinals
1	(Switzerland) Martina Hingis (India) Sania Mirza	6	4	6
12	(Germany) Anna-Lena Grönefeld (United States) CoCo Vandeweghe	2	6	1
13	(Germany) Julia Görges (Czech Republic) Karolína Plíšková	6	6
PR	(United States) Vania King (Russia) Alla Kudryavtseva	2	4
(Australia) Anastasia Rodionova (Australia) Arina Rodionova	2	7	4
15	(China) Xu Yifan (China) Zheng Saisai	6	5	6
7	(Czech Republic) Andrea Hlaváčková (Czech Republic) Lucie Hradecká	2	7	6
2	(Chinese Taipei) Chan Hao-ching (Chinese Taipei) Chan Yung-jan	6	5	3

Semifinals
1	(Switzerland) Martina Hingis (India) Sania Mirza	6	6
13	(Germany) Julia Görges (Czech Republic) Karolína Plíšková	1	0
15	(China) Xu Yifan (China) Zheng Saisai	6	3	1
7	(Czech Republic) Andrea Hlaváčková (Czech Republic) Lucie Hradecká	3	6	6

Final
1	(Switzerland) Martina Hingis (India) Sania Mirza	7^{7}	6
7	(Czech Republic) Andrea Hlaváčková (Czech Republic) Lucie Hradecká	6^{1}	3

=== Top half ===
==== Section 1 ====
First round
1	(Switzerland) M Hingis (India) S Mirza	6	6
(Colombia) M Duque Mariño (Brazil) T Pereira	2	3
WC	(Australia) K Birrell (Australia) P Hon	4	3
(Ukraine) L Kichenok (Ukraine) N Kichenok	6	6
WC	(Australia) J Moore (Australia) S Sanders	6	6
WC	(Australia) E Perez (Australia) B Woolcock	4	2
(Russia) S Kuznetsova (Italy) R Vinci	6	3	6
14	(Netherlands) K Bertens (Sweden) J Larsson	2	6	2
12	(Germany) A-L Grönefeld (United States) C Vandeweghe	6	7^{8}
(Germany) A Beck (Germany) C Witthöft	3	6^{6}
WC	(Australia) T Patterson (Australia) O Rogowska	4	5
(Switzerland) B Bencic (Slovakia) M Rybáriková	6	7
(Croatia) M Lučić-Baroni (Czech Republic) B Strýcová	7^{7}	6
(Germany) M Barthel (Germany) L Siegemund	6^{4}	1
(Italy) S Errani (Spain) MJ Martínez Sánchez	2	3
6	(United States) R Atawo (United States) A Spears	6	6

Second round
1	(Switzerland) M Hingis (India) S Mirza	6	6
(Ukraine) L Kichenok (Ukraine) N Kichenok	2	3
WC	(Australia) J Moore (Australia) S Sanders	0	3
(Russia) S Kuznetsova (Italy) R Vinci	6	6
12	(Germany) A-L Grönefeld (United States) C Vandeweghe	w/o
(Switzerland) B Bencic (Slovakia) M Rybáriková
(Croatia) M Lučić-Baroni (Czech Republic) B Strýcová	6^{4}	6	6
6	(United States) R Atawo (United States) A Spears	7^{7}	1	2

Third round
1	(Switzerland) M Hingis (India) S Mirza	6	6
(Russia) S Kuznetsova (Italy) R Vinci	1	3
12	(Germany) A-L Grönefeld (United States) C Vandeweghe	7^{7}	3	6
(Croatia) M Lučić-Baroni (Czech Republic) B Strýcová	6^{5}	6	3

Quarterfinals
1	(Switzerland) M Hingis (India) S Mirza	6	4	6
12	(Germany) A-L Grönefeld (United States) C Vandeweghe	2	6	1

==== Section 2 ====
First round
3	(France) C Garcia (France) K Mladenovic	6	6
(Argentina) M Irigoyen (Spain) MT Torró Flor	3	2
Alt	(United States) M Sanchez (Liechtenstein) S Vogt	6	2	7^{7}
(Croatia) D Jurak (United States) N Melichar	3	6	6^{1}
(Belgium) A Van Uytvanck (Belgium) Y Wickmayer	3	3
(Czech Republic) B Krejčíková (China) Y Wang	6	6
(Chinese Taipei) C-j Chuang (Belarus) O Govortsova	6^{6}	4
13	(Germany) J Görges (Czech Republic) Ka Plíšková	7^{8}	6
11	(Kazakhstan) Y Shvedova (Australia) S Stosur	7^{7}	6
(Romania) A Dulgheru (Spain) S Soler Espinosa	6^{3}	3
PR	(United States) V King (Russia) A Kudryavtseva	6	6
(Chinese Taipei) C-w Chan (Japan) K Nara	1	4
(Belgium) Y Bonaventure (Romania) R Olaru	6	6
(Serbia) J Janković (Germany) A Petkovic	4	4
(Australia) D Gavrilova (Ukraine) E Svitolina	0	2
5	(Russia) A Pavlyuchenkova (Russia) E Vesnina	6	6

Second round
3	(France) C Garcia (France) K Mladenovic	6	6
Alt	(United States) M Sanchez (Liechtenstein) S Vogt	2	1
(Czech Republic) B Krejčíková (China) Y Wang	5	3
13	(Germany) J Görges (Czech Republic) Ka Plíšková	7	6
11	(Kazakhstan) Y Shvedova (Australia) S Stosur	1	4
PR	(United States) V King (Russia) A Kudryavtseva	6	6
(Belgium) Y Bonaventure (Romania) R Olaru	1	2
5	(Russia) A Pavlyuchenkova (Russia) E Vesnina	6	6

Third round
3	(France) C Garcia (France) K Mladenovic	1	6^{5}
13	(Germany) J Görges (Czech Republic) Ka Plíšková	6	7^{7}
PR	(United States) V King (Russia) A Kudryavtseva	2	6	6
5	(Russia) A Pavlyuchenkova (Russia) E Vesnina	6	4	3

Quarterfinals
13	(Germany) J Görges (Czech Republic) Ka Plíšková	6	6
PR	(United States) V King (Russia) A Kudryavtseva	2	4

=== Bottom half ===
==== Section 3 ====
First round
8	(Spain) L Arruabarrena (Slovenia) A Klepač	0	4
(Australia) An Rodionova (Australia) Ar Rodionova	6	6
(Poland) K Jans-Ignacik (Poland) P Kania	2	6	4
(Germany) S Lisicki (United States) B Mattek-Sands	6	3	6
(United States) M Keys (Australia) A Tomljanović	6	6
(Slovakia) J Husárová (Slovakia) AK Schmiedlová	3	4
(Slovakia) D Cibulková (Belgium) K Flipkens	6	3	6
9	(Romania) I-C Begu (Romania) M Niculescu	4	6	4
15	(China) Y Xu (China) S Zheng	6	6
(Latvia) J Ostapenko (Kazakhstan) Y Putintseva	4	3
(Russia) D Kasatkina (Montenegro) D Kovinić	5	6	6
(United States) M Brengle (Germany) T Maria	7	4	3
(Japan) M Doi (Japan) N Hibino	6	2	6^{0}
(Chinese Taipei) S-w Hsieh (Georgia (country)) O Kalashnikova	2	6	7^{7}
(Russia) V Dushevina (Czech Republic) K Siniaková	3	5
4	(Hungary) T Babos (Slovenia) K Srebotnik	6	7

Second round
(Australia) An Rodionova (Australia) Ar Rodionova	6	4	7^{7}
(Germany) S Lisicki (United States) B Mattek-Sands	4	6	6^{5}
(United States) M Keys (Australia) A Tomljanović	3	5
(Slovakia) D Cibulková (Belgium) K Flipkens	6	7
15	(China) Y Xu (China) S Zheng	6	6
(Russia) D Kasatkina (Montenegro) D Kovinić	3	2
(Chinese Taipei) S-w Hsieh (Georgia (country)) O Kalashnikova	6	4	7
4	(Hungary) T Babos (Slovenia) K Srebotnik	3	6	5

Third round
(Australia) An Rodionova (Australia) Ar Rodionova	5	6	6
(Slovakia) D Cibulková (Belgium) K Flipkens	7	2	4
15	(China) Y Xu (China) S Zheng	6	6
(Chinese Taipei) S-w Hsieh (Georgia (country)) O Kalashnikova	2	4

Quarterfinals
(Australia) An Rodionova (Australia) Ar Rodionova	2	7	4
15	(China) Y Xu (China) S Zheng	6	5	6

==== Section 4 ====
First round
7	(Czech Republic) A Hlaváčková (Czech Republic) L Hradecká	6	6^{4}	6
WC	(Japan) S Aoyama (Japan) M Ninomiya	2	7^{7}	1
(Kazakhstan) Z Diyas (China) K Zhang	2	4
(Russia) M Gasparyan (Russia) A Panova	6	6
(United States) I Falconi (United States) V Lepchenko	6^{6}	6	6
WC	(Australia) A Bai (Australia) N Bains	7^{8}	2	3
(Slovenia) P Hercog (United States) C McHale	3	3
10	(Spain) A Medina Garrigues (Spain) A Parra Santonja	6	6
16	(Canada) G Dabrowski (Poland) A Rosolska	1	6^{7}
(United Kingdom) J Konta (United Kingdom) H Watson	6	7^{9}
(United Kingdom) J Rae (United Kingdom) A Smith	3	6	7^{7}
PR	(China) C Liang (China) S Peng	6	2	6^{2}
(Ukraine) K Bondarenko (Ukraine) O Savchuk	6	6
(France) A Cornet (Poland) M Linette	4	0
(Czech Republic) D Allertová (Netherlands) D Schuurs	1	1
2	(Chinese Taipei) H-c Chan (Chinese Taipei) Y-j Chan	6	6

Second round
7	(Czech Republic) A Hlaváčková (Czech Republic) L Hradecká	7	6
(Russia) M Gasparyan (Russia) A Panova	5	1
(United States) I Falconi (United States) V Lepchenko	2	2
10	(Spain) A Medina Garrigues (Spain) A Parra Santonja	6	6
(United Kingdom) J Konta (United Kingdom) H Watson	2	3
(United Kingdom) J Rae (United Kingdom) A Smith	6	6
(Ukraine) K Bondarenko (Ukraine) O Savchuk	3	3
2	(Chinese Taipei) H-c Chan (Chinese Taipei) Y-j Chan	6	6

Third round
7	(Czech Republic) A Hlaváčková (Czech Republic) L Hradecká	6	7^{9}
10	(Spain) A Medina Garrigues (Spain) A Parra Santonja	2	6^{7}
(United Kingdom) J Rae (United Kingdom) A Smith	3	4
2	(Chinese Taipei) H-c Chan (Chinese Taipei) Y-j Chan	6	6

Quarterfinals
7	(Czech Republic) A Hlaváčková (Czech Republic) L Hradecká	2	7	6
2	(Chinese Taipei) H-c Chan (Chinese Taipei) Y-j Chan	6	5	3
