= 2016 Australian Open – Women's legends' doubles =

Women's legends' doubles
- 2016 Australian Open

Final
- Champions: (United States) Lindsay Davenport (United States) Martina Navratilova

Events
Singles	men	women		boys	girls
Doubles	men	women	mixed	boys	girls
WC Singles	men	women	quad
WC Doubles	men	women	quad
Legends	men	women	mixed
← 2015 ·	Australian Open	· 2017 →

== Draw ==
=== Key ===
- Q = Qualifier
- WC = Wild card
- LL = Lucky loser
- Alt = Alternate
- ITF = ITF entry
- PR = Protected ranking
- SR = Special ranking
- SE = Special exempt
- JE = Junior exempt
- JR = Junior Accelerator Programme entrant
- CO = College Accelerator Programme entrant
- NG = Next Gen Accelerator Program entrant
- w/o = Walkover
- r = Retired
- d = Defaulted

	(France) M Bartoli (Spain) A Sánchez Vicario	(United States) L Davenport (United States) M Navratilova	(Belgium) K Clijsters (Croatia) I Majoli	(Australia) N Bradtke (Austria) B Schett	RR W–L	Set W–L	Game W–L	Standings
(France) Marion Bartoli (Spain) Arantxa Sánchez Vicario		0–4, 1–4	not played	4–0, 4–2	1–1	2–2	9–10	2
(United States) Lindsay Davenport (United States) Martina Navratilova	4–0, 4–1		4–3^{(5–2)}, 4–3^{(5–4)}	4–1, 4–3^{(5–2)}	3–0	6–0	24–11	1
(Belgium) Kim Clijsters (Croatia) Iva Majoli	not played	3–4^{(2–5)}, 3–4^{(4–5)}		4–3^{(5–0)}, 2–4, 4–3^{(5–4)}	1–1	2–3	16–18	3
(Australia) Nicole Bradtke (Austria) Barbara Schett	0–4, 2–4	1–4, 3–4^{(2–5)}	3–4^{(0–5)}, 4–2, 3–4^{(4–5)}		0–3	1–6	16–26	4

Standings are determined by: 1. number of wins; 2. number of matches; 3. in two-players-ties, head-to-head records; 4. in three-players-ties, percentage of sets won, or of games won; 5. steering-committee decision.
