= 2016 Australian Open – Wheelchair women's singles =

Wheelchair women's singles
- 2016 Australian Open

Final
- Champion: (Netherlands) Jiske Griffioen
- Runner-up: (Netherlands) Aniek van Koot
- Score: 6–3, 7–5

Events
Singles	men	women		boys	girls
Doubles	men	women	mixed	boys	girls
WC Singles	men	women	quad
WC Doubles	men	women	quad
Legends	men	women	mixed
← 2015 ·	Australian Open	· 2017 →

Defending champion Jiske Griffioen defeated Aniek van Koot in the final, 6–3, 7–5 to win the women's singles wheelchair tennis title at the 2016 Australian Open.

== Seeds ==
1. (Netherlands) Jiske Griffioen (champion)
2. (Japan) Yui Kamiji (semifinals)

== Draw ==
=== Key ===
- Q = Qualifier
- WC = Wild card
- LL = Lucky loser
- Alt = Alternate
- ITF = ITF entry
- PR = Protected ranking
- SR = Special ranking
- SE = Special exempt
- JE = Junior exempt
- JR = Junior Accelerator Programme entrant
- CO = College Accelerator Programme entrant
- NG = Next Gen Accelerator Program entrant
- w/o = Walkover
- r = Retired
- d = Defaulted

Quarterfinals
1	(Netherlands) Jiske Griffioen	7	6
(United Kingdom) Lucy Shuker	5	2
(United Kingdom) Jordanne Whiley	6^{2}	6	4
(Netherlands) Marjolein Buis	7^{7}	4	6
(South Africa) Kgothatso Montjane	6^{13}	5
(Netherlands) Aniek van Koot	7^{15}	7
(Germany) Sabine Ellerbrock	0	6	2
2	(Japan) Yui Kamiji	6	4	6

Semifinals
1	(Netherlands) Jiske Griffioen	6	6
(Netherlands) Marjolein Buis	2	2
(Netherlands) Aniek van Koot	7	7
2	(Japan) Yui Kamiji	5	5

Final
1	(Netherlands) Jiske Griffioen	6	7
(Netherlands) Aniek van Koot	3	5
