= 2016 Australian Open – Wheelchair men's doubles =

Wheelchair men's doubles
- 2016 Australian Open

Final
- Champions: (France) Stéphane Houdet (France) Nicolas Peifer
- Runners-up: (Japan) Shingo Kunieda (United Kingdom) Gordon Reid
- Score: 6–3, 3–6, 7–5

Events
Singles	men	women		boys	girls
Doubles	men	women	mixed	boys	girls
WC Singles	men	women	quad
WC Doubles	men	women	quad
Legends	men	women	mixed
← 2015 ·	Australian Open	· 2017 →

Two-time defending champion Stéphane Houdet and his partner Nicolas Peifer defeated the other three-time defending champion Shingo Kunieda and his partner Gordon Reid in the final, 6–3, 3–6, 7–5 to win the men's doubles wheelchair tennis title at the 2016 Australian Open. With the win, Peifer completed the career Grand Slam.

== Seeds ==
1. (France) Stéphane Houdet / (France) Nicolas Peifer (champions)
2. (Japan) Shingo Kunieda / (United Kingdom) Gordon Reid (final)

== Draw ==
=== Key ===
- Q = Qualifier
- WC = Wild card
- LL = Lucky loser
- Alt = Alternate
- ITF = ITF entry
- PR = Protected ranking
- SR = Special ranking
- SE = Special exempt
- JE = Junior exempt
- JR = Junior Accelerator Programme entrant
- CO = College Accelerator Programme entrant
- NG = Next Gen Accelerator Program entrant
- w/o = Walkover
- r = Retired
- d = Defaulted

Semifinals
1	(France) Stéphane Houdet (France) Nicolas Peifer	6	6
(Australia) Adam Kellerman (Netherlands) Maikel Scheffers	0	1
(Argentina) Gustavo Fernández (Belgium) Joachim Gérard	6^{3}	2
2	(Japan) Shingo Kunieda (United Kingdom) Gordon Reid	7^{7}	6

Final
1	(France) Stéphane Houdet (France) Nicolas Peifer	6	3	7
2	(Japan) Shingo Kunieda (United Kingdom) Gordon Reid	3	6	5
