= 2016 Australian Open – Girls' singles =

Girls' singles
- 2016 Australian Open

Final
- Champion: (Belarus) Vera Lapko
- Runner-up: (Slovakia) Tereza Mihalíková
- Score: 6–3, 6–4

Events
Singles	men	women		boys	girls
Doubles	men	women	mixed	boys	girls
WC Singles	men	women	quad
WC Doubles	men	women	quad
Legends	men	women	mixed
- Australian Open

Vera Lapko won the title, defeating defending champion Tereza Mihalíková in the final, 6–3, 6–4.

== Seeds ==
1. (Canada) Bianca Andreescu (third round; withdrew)
2. (Slovakia) Tereza Mihalíková (final)
3. (Canada) Charlotte Robillard-Millette (first round)
4. (Russia) Anna Kalinskaya (quarterfinals)
5. (Belarus) Vera Lapko (champion)
6. (China) Zheng Wushuang (first round)
7. (Australia) Kimberly Birrell (withdrew)
8. (Russia) Anastasia Potapova (quarterfinals)
9. (Switzerland) Rebeka Masarova (semifinals)

10. (India) Pranjala Yadlapalli (third round)
11. (Australia) Priscilla Hon (withdrew)
12. (Japan) Chihiro Muramatsu (third round)
13. (Japan) Mai Hontama (first round)
14. (Czech Republic) Lucie Kaňková (second round)
15. (Canada) Katherine Sebov (third round)
16. (Ukraine) Dayana Yastremska (quarterfinals)
17. (Ukraine) Anastasia Zarytska (third round)

== Draw ==
Key

- Q = Qualifier
- WC = Wild card
- LL = Lucky loser
- Alt = Alternate
- ITF = ITF entry
- PR = Protected ranking
- SR = Special ranking
- SE = Special exempt
- JE = Junior exempt
- JR = Junior Accelerator Programme entrant
- CO = College Accelerator Programme entrant
- NG = Next Gen Accelerator Program entrant
- w/o = Walkover
- r = Retired
- d = Defaulted

=== Finals ===
Quarterfinals
WC	(Australia) Baijing Lin	1	7	2
Q	(Australia) Sara Tomic	6	5	6
4	(Russia) Anna Kalinskaya	5	7	2
5	(Belarus) Vera Lapko	7	5	6
9	(Switzerland) Rebeka Masarova	4	6	6
16	(Ukraine) Dayana Yastremska	6	3	4
8	(Russia) Anastasia Potapova	1	3
2	(Slovakia) Tereza Mihalíková	6	6

Semifinals
Q	(Australia) Sara Tomic	2	3
5	(Belarus) Vera Lapko	6	6
9	(Switzerland) Rebeka Masarova	3	3
2	(Slovakia) Tereza Mihalíková	6	6

Final
5	(Belarus) Vera Lapko	6	6
2	(Slovakia) Tereza Mihalíková	3	4

=== Top half ===
==== Section 1 ====
First round
1	(Canada) Bianca Andreescu	6	6
LL	(Japan) Satoko Sueno	1	1
(New Zealand) Jade Lewis	6	6^{4}	6
(China) Cao Siqi	3	7^{7}	4
WC	(Australia) Baijing Lin	7	6
(Romania) Georgia Crăciun	5	2
(Japan) Haruna Arakawa	3	2
14	(Czech Republic) Lucie Kaňková	6	6
LL	(Australia) Olivia Gadecki	3	4
(India) Karman Thandi	6	6
(Russia) Elena Rybakina	4	2
(Hungary) Panna Udvardy	6	6
(Thailand) Bunyawi Thamchaiwat	6	6
SE	(South Africa) Lee Barnard	4	3
Q	(Australia) Sara Tomic	7	7
6	(China) Zheng Wushuang	5	5

Second round
1	(Canada) B Andreescu	6	6
(New Zealand) J Lewis	2	3
WC	(Australia) B Lin	6	7^{7}
14	(Czech Republic) L Kaňková	4	6^{4}
(India) K Thandi	6	6
(Hungary) P Udvardy	4	2
(Thailand) B Thamchaiwat	4	1
Q	(Australia) S Tomic	6	6

Third round
1	(Canada) B Andreescu
WC	(Australia) B Lin	w/o
(India) K Thandi	6	5	5
Q	(Australia) S Tomic	3	7	7

Quarterfinals
WC	(Australia) B Lin	1	7	2
Q	(Australia) S Tomic	6	5	6

==== Section 2 ====
First round
4	(Russia) Anna Kalinskaya	6	6
Q	(Japan) Ayumi Miyamoto	2	1
(Spain) Eva Guerrero Álvarez	7	6
(Australia) Maddison Inglis	5	1
(United States) Maria Mateas	1	4
WC	(Australia) Petra Hule	6	6
(India) Mihika Yadav	0	2
15	(Canada) Katherine Sebov	6	6
12	(Japan) Chihiro Muramatsu	6	6
(Slovenia) Kaja Juvan	3	2
(Australia) Jaimee Fourlis	6	6
(United Kingdom) Ema Lazic	4	3
Q	(Italy) Lucrezia Stefanini	3	1
(China) Ren Jiaqi	6	6
WC	(Australia) Michaela Haet	1	4
5	(Belarus) Vera Lapko	6	6

Second round
4	(Russia) A Kalinskaya	6	6
(Spain) E Guerrero Álvarez	0	2
WC	(Australia) P Hule	4	2
15	(Canada) K Sebov	6	6
12	(Japan) C Muramatsu	6	2	6
(Australia) J Fourlis	3	6	2
(China) J Ren	1	4
5	(Belarus) V Lapko	6	6

Third round
4	(Russia) A Kalinskaya	6	6
15	(Canada) K Sebov	4	3
12	(Japan) C Muramatsu	2	3
5	(Belarus) V Lapko	6	6

Quarterfinals
4	(Russia) A Kalinskaya	5	7	2
5	(Belarus) V Lapko	7	5	6

=== Bottom half ===
==== Section 3 ====
First round
17	(Ukraine) Anastasia Zarytska	7	7^{7}
(Greece) Eleni Christofi	5	6^{3}
Q	(Republic of Ireland) Georgia Drummy	3	3
Q	(Japan) Ayano Shimizu	6	6
(Romania) Oana Gavrilă	1	7^{7}	1
(Netherlands) Nina Kruijer	6	6^{5}	6
(Turkey) Berfu Cengiz	3	5
9	(Switzerland) Rebeka Masarova	6	7
16	(Ukraine) Dayana Yastremska	3	7	6
Q	(Croatia) Lea Bošković	6	5	2
(China) Wei Zhanlan	6	6
WC	(Australia) Kaitlin Staines	3	4
Q	(Chinese Taipei) Cho I-hsuan	3	1
WC	(Australia) Violet Apisah	6	6
(Italy) Ludmilla Samsonova	6^{1}	6	6
3	(Canada) Charlotte Robillard-Millette	7^{7}	1	4

Second round
17	(Ukraine) A Zarytska	6	6
Q	(Japan) A Shimizu	2	3
(Netherlands) N Kruijer	2	2
9	(Switzerland) R Masarova	6	6
16	(Ukraine) D Yastremska	6	7^{7}
(China) Z Wei	4	6^{1}
WC	(Australia) V Apisah	6	6
(Italy) L Samsonova	4	1

Third round
17	(Ukraine) A Zarytska	3	0
9	(Switzerland) R Masarova	6	6
16	(Ukraine) D Yastremska	6	6
WC	(Australia) V Apisah	3	3

Quarterfinals
9	(Switzerland) R Masarova	4	6	6
16	(Ukraine) D Yastremska	6	3	4

==== Section 4 ====
First round
8	(Russia) Anastasia Potapova	6	6
(Serbia) Olga Danilović	2	1
(China) Guo Hanyu	2	4
WC	(Australia) Renee McBryde	6	6
WC	(Australia) Aleksa Cveticanin	1	6	6
(Austria) Mira Antonitsch	6	4	8
(Japan) Mayuka Aikawa	4	7	1
10	(India) Pranjala Yadlapalli	6	5	6
13	(Japan) Mai Hontama	3	2
(Belgium) Lara Salden	6	6
(Australia) Destanee Aiava	6	3	6
WC	(China) Wang Xiyu	2	6	3
SE	(South Africa) Zani Barnard	6	3	4
(Spain) Cristina Bucșa	3	6	6
(Romania) Ioana Mincă	5	4
2	(Slovakia) Tereza Mihalíková	7	6

Second round
8	(Russia) A Potapova	5	6	6
WC	(Australia) R McBryde	7	3	2
(Austria) M Antonitsch	6^{5}	3
10	(India) P Yadlapalli	7^{7}	6
(Belgium) L Salden	6	3	9
(Australia) D Aiava	2	6	7
(Spain) C Bucșa	6^{3}	6	2
2	(Slovakia) T Mihalíková	7^{7}	4	6

Third round
8	(Russia) A Potapova	7	7
10	(India) P Yadlapalli	5	5
(Belgium) L Salden	3	2
2	(Slovakia) T Mihalíková	6	6

Quarterfinals
8	(Russia) A Potapova	1	3
2	(Slovakia) T Mihalíková	6	6

== Qualifying ==
=== Seeds ===
1. (Serbia) Olga Danilović (qualified)
2. (China) Ma Shuyue (qualifying competition)
3. (Italy) Lucrezia Stefanini (qualified)
4. (Poland) Daria Kuczer (first round)
5. (United States) Helen Abigail Altick (qualifying competition)
6. (Indonesia) Rifanty Kahfiani (first round)
7. (Croatia) Lea Bošković (qualified)
8. (Japan) Ayumi Miyamoto (qualified)
9. (Netherlands) Isolde de Jong (first round)
10. (Chinese Taipei) Cho I-hsuan (qualified)
11. (China) Ni Ma Zhuoma (qualifying competition)
12. (Japan) Naho Sato (first round)
13. (Netherlands) Phillis Vanenburg (qualifying competition)
14. (Japan) Misaki Matsuda (first round)
15. (Republic of Ireland) Georgia Drummy (qualified)
16. (China) Mu Shouna (first round)

=== Qualifiers ===
1. (Serbia) Olga Danilović
2. (Chinese Taipei) Cho I-hsuan
3. (Italy) Lucrezia Stefanini
4. (Japan) Ayano Shimizu
5. (Republic of Ireland) Georgia Drummy
6. (Australia) Sara Tomic
7. (Croatia) Lea Bošković
8. (Japan) Ayumi Miyamoto

=== Lucky losers ===
1. (Japan) Satoko Sueno
2. (Australia) Olivia Gadecki

=== Draw ===
==== First qualifier ====
First round
1	(Serbia) Olga Danilović	6	6
(India) Snehal Mane	4	0
WC	(Australia) Alexandra Bozovic	7^{7}	6
14	(Japan) Misaki Matsuda	6^{2}	2

Qualifying competition
1	(Serbia) Olga Danilović	6	6
WC	(Australia) Alexandra Bozovic	3	4

==== Second qualifier ====
First round
2	(China) Ma Shuyue	6	6
WC	(Australia) Sasha Bollweg	3	1
(Australia) Daniela Kovacevic	0	3
10	(Chinese Taipei) Cho I-hsuan	6	6

Qualifying competition
2	(China) Ma Shuyue	3	4
10	(Chinese Taipei) Cho I-hsuan	6	6

==== Third qualifier ====
First round
3	(Italy) Lucrezia Stefanini	6	6
(Australia) Selina Turulja	0	1
WC	(Australia) Kaylah McPhee	7^{8}	7
12	(Japan) Naho Sato	6^{6}	5

Qualifying competition
3	(Italy) Lucrezia Stefanini	7^{7}	6
WC	(Australia) Kaylah McPhee	6^{2}	0

==== Fourth qualifier ====
First round
4	(Poland) Daria Kuczer	0	6	4
(Japan) Ayano Shimizu	6	1	6
WC	(Australia) Annerly Poulos	5	0
13	(Netherlands) Phillis Vanenburg	7	6

Qualifying competition
(Japan) Ayano Shimizu	7	2	6
13	(Netherlands) Phillis Vanenburg	5	6	1

==== Fifth qualifier ====
First round
5	(United States) Helen Abigail Altick	6	6
(Australia) Jessica Zaviacic	3	2
(Japan) Sakura Yonehara	3	7^{7}	5
15	(Republic of Ireland) Georgia Drummy	6	6^{0}	7

Qualifying competition
5	(United States) Helen Abigail Altick	2	6^{2}
15	(Republic of Ireland) Georgia Drummy	6	7^{7}

==== Sixth qualifier ====
First round
6	(Indonesia) Rifanty Kahfiani	6	4	2
WC	(Australia) Sara Tomic	4	6	6
(Australia) Amber Marshall	2	3
11	(China) Ni Ma Zhuoma	6	6

Qualifying competition
WC	(Australia) Sara Tomic	6	6
11	(China) Ni Ma Zhuoma	2	0

==== Seventh qualifier ====
First round
7	(Croatia) Lea Bošković	5	7	6
(Australia) Brooke Winley	7	5	4
(Japan) Satoko Sueno	7^{10}	7^{8}
16	(China) Mu Shouna	6^{8}	6^{6}

Qualifying competition
7	(Croatia) Lea Bošković	6	6
(Japan) Satoko Sueno	1	4

==== Eighth qualifier ====
First round
8	(Japan) Ayumi Miyamoto	6	6
(Australia) Gabriela Sprague	1	1
WC	(Australia) Olivia Gadecki	6	6
9	(Netherlands) Isolde de Jong	4	0

Qualifying competition
8	(Japan) Ayumi Miyamoto	6	5	6
WC	(Australia) Olivia Gadecki	1	7	3
