= 2016 Australian Open – Mixed doubles =

Mixed doubles
- 2016 Australian Open

Final
- Champions: (Russia) Elena Vesnina (Brazil) Bruno Soares
- Runners-up: (United States) CoCo Vandeweghe (Romania) Horia Tecău
- Score: 6–4, 4–6, [10–5]

Details
- Draw: 32
- Seeds: 8

Events
Singles	men	women		boys	girls
Doubles	men	women	mixed	boys	girls
WC Singles	men	women	quad
WC Doubles	men	women	quad
Legends	men	women	mixed
- Australian Open

Martina Hingis and Leander Paes were the defending champions, but lost in the quarterfinals to Sania Mirza and Ivan Dodig.

Elena Vesnina and Bruno Soares won the title, defeating CoCo Vandeweghe and Horia Tecău in the final, 6–4, 4–6, [10–5].

== Seeds ==
1. (India) Sania Mirza / (Croatia) Ivan Dodig (semifinals)
2. (United States) Bethanie Mattek-Sands / (United States) Bob Bryan (quarterfinals)
3. (Chinese Taipei) Chan Yung-jan / (India) Rohan Bopanna (quarterfinals)
4. (Slovenia) Katarina Srebotnik / (United Kingdom) Jamie Murray (quarterfinals)
5. (Russia) Elena Vesnina / (Brazil) Bruno Soares (champions)
6. (Czech Republic) Lucie Hradecká / (Poland) Marcin Matkowski (first round)
7. (United States) Raquel Atawo / (South Africa) Raven Klaasen (first round)
8. (Chinese Taipei) Chan Hao-ching / (Belarus) Max Mirnyi (first round)

== Draw ==
Key

- Q = Qualifier
- WC = Wild card
- LL = Lucky loser
- Alt = Alternate
- ITF = ITF entry
- PR = Protected ranking
- SR = Special ranking
- SE = Special exempt
- JE = Junior exempt
- JR = Junior Accelerator Programme entrant
- CO = College Accelerator Programme entrant
- NG = Next Gen Accelerator Program entrant
- w/o = Walkover
- r = Retired
- d = Defaulted

=== Finals ===
Semifinals
1	(India) Sania Mirza (Croatia) Ivan Dodig	5	6^{4}
5	(Russia) Elena Vesnina (Brazil) Bruno Soares	7	7^{7}
(Slovenia) Andreja Klepač (Philippines) Treat Huey	4	4
(United States) CoCo Vandeweghe (Romania) Horia Tecău	6	6

Final
5	(Russia) Elena Vesnina (Brazil) Bruno Soares	6	4	[10]
(United States) CoCo Vandeweghe (Romania) Horia Tecău	4	6	[5]

=== Top half ===
First round
1	(India) S Mirza (Croatia) I Dodig	7	6
WC	(Australia) A Tomljanović (Australia) N Kyrgios	5	1
WC	(Australia) D Gavrilova (Australia) L Saville	4	6^{5}
(Kazakhstan) Y Shvedova (Pakistan) A-u-H Qureshi	6	7^{7}
(Russia) A Pavlyuchenkova (United Kingdom) D Inglot	3	5
(Switzerland) M Hingis (India) L Paes	6	7
(United States) S Stephens (Netherlands) J-J Rojer	6	4	[10]
8	(Chinese Taipei) H-c Chan (Belarus) M Mirnyi	4	6	[5]
4	(Slovenia) K Srebotnik (United Kingdom) J Murray	7^{8}	6
WC	(Australia) An Rodionova (Australia) C Guccione	6^{6}	0
(Germany) A-L Grönefeld (Colombia) R Farah	4	6	[10]
(Spain) A Medina Garrigues (Colombia) JS Cabal	6	2	[7]
WC	(Australia) M Inglis (Australia) B Mitchell	3	2
(Chinese Taipei) S-w Hsieh (Austria) A Peya	6	6
WC	(China) S Zheng (South Korea) H Chung	3	7^{7}	[7]
5	(Russia) E Vesnina (Brazil) B Soares	6	6^{4}	[10]

Second round
1	(India) S Mirza (Croatia) I Dodig	7	6
(Kazakhstan) Y Shvedova (Pakistan) A-u-H Qureshi	5	2
(Switzerland) M Hingis (India) L Paes	6	6
(United States) S Stephens (Netherlands) J-J Rojer	1	2
4	(Slovenia) K Srebotnik (United Kingdom) J Murray	6	6
(Germany) A-L Grönefeld (Colombia) R Farah	4	4
(Chinese Taipei) S-w Hsieh (Austria) A Peya	2	3
5	(Russia) E Vesnina (Brazil) B Soares	6	6

Quarterfinals
1	(India) S Mirza (Croatia) I Dodig	7^{7}	6
(Switzerland) M Hingis (India) L Paes	6^{1}	3
4	(Slovenia) K Srebotnik (United Kingdom) J Murray	2	3
5	(Russia) E Vesnina (Brazil) B Soares	6	6

Semifinals
1	(India) S Mirza (Croatia) I Dodig	5	6^{4}
5	(Russia) E Vesnina (Brazil) B Soares	7	7^{7}

=== Bottom half ===
First round
7	(United States) R Atawo (South Africa) R Klaasen	7^{7}	2	[4]
(Russia) A Kudryavtseva (Sweden) R Lindstedt	6^{4}	6	[10]
(Slovenia) A Klepač (Philippines) T Huey	6	4	[10]
(Ukraine) E Svitolina (New Zealand) A Sitak	4	6	[3]
(Czech Republic) A Hlaváčková (Poland) Ł Kubot	6	6
(Spain) L Arruabarrena (Spain) D Marrero	0	3
WC	(Australia) K Birrell (Australia) J Millman	5	1
3	(Chinese Taipei) Y-j Chan (India) R Bopanna	7	6
6	(Czech Republic) L Hradecká (Poland) M Matkowski	6	5	[8]
(United States) C Vandeweghe (Romania) H Tecău	1	7	[10]
Alt	(Spain) A Parra Santonja (Spain) M López	6^{3}	5
(Italy) S Errani (Italy) F Fognini	7^{7}	7
WC	(Australia) Ar Rodionova (Australia) M Reid	6	2	[8]
(Australia) S Stosur (Australia) J Peers	4	6	[10]
WC	(Australia) J Moore (Australia) M Polmans	2	1
2	(United States) B Mattek-Sands (United States) B Bryan	6	6

Second round
(Russia) A Kudryavtseva (Sweden) R Lindstedt	3	6	[7]
(Slovenia) A Klepač (Philippines) T Huey	6	3	[10]
(Czech Republic) A Hlaváčková (Poland) Ł Kubot	6	3	[6]
3	(Chinese Taipei) Y-j Chan (India) R Bopanna	4	6	[10]
(United States) C Vandeweghe (Romania) H Tecău	w/o
(Italy) S Errani (Italy) F Fognini
(Australia) S Stosur (Australia) J Peers	4	2
2	(United States) B Mattek-Sands (United States) B Bryan	6	6

Quarterfinals
(Slovenia) A Klepač (Philippines) T Huey	6	7
3	(Chinese Taipei) Y-j Chan (India) R Bopanna	2	5
(United States) C Vandeweghe (Romania) H Tecău	6	6^{5}	[10]
2	(United States) B Mattek-Sands (United States) B Bryan	3	7^{7}	[6]

Semifinals
(Slovenia) A Klepač (Philippines) T Huey	4	4
(United States) C Vandeweghe (Romania) H Tecău	6	6
