= 2015 Australian Open – Main draw wildcard entries =

- Date: 20 October 2014 – 12 January 2015
- Edition: 103rd
- Category: Grand Slam (ITF)
- Location: United States (6 places across the country); Shenzhen, Guangdong Province, China; Melbourne, Victoria, Australia
| ← 2014 · | Australian Open – Main draw wildcard entries | · 2016 → |

The 2015 Australian Open wildcard playoffs and entries are a group of events and internal selections to choose the eight men and eight women singles wildcard entries for the 2015 Australian Open, as well as seven male and seven female doubles teams plus eight mixed doubles teams.

One wildcard each was given to the winners of the Australian Open Wildcard Playoff, a tournament between Australian players who did not receive direct entry into the draw.

In an agreement with the United States Tennis Association and the French Tennis Federation, Tennis Australia gives one man and one woman from the United States and France each a wildcard into the Australian Open. The French players were chosen by internal selection, while 2014 USTA Pro Circuit's Australian Open Wild Card Challenge determined the two American players receiving wildcards.

Since the Australian Open is promoted as the "Grand Slam of Asia/Pacific", one male and one female player from this geographical area were awarded a wildcard. This was decided through the Asia-Pacific Australian Open Wildcard Playoff. At the same event, one male and one female doubles team won wildcards, and one wildcard each was contested in boys and girls singles.

Remaining wildcards were awarded by internal Australian selection.

== Wildcard entries ==
=== Men's singles ===
| Country | Name | Method of qualification |
|---|---|---|
| CHN | Zhang Ze | Asia-Pacific Wildcard Playoff |
| FRA | Lucas Pouille | French internal selection |
| USA | Denis Kudla | American Wildcard Challenge |
| AUS | Jordan Thompson | Australian Wildcard Playoff |
| AUS | James Duckworth | Australian internal selection |
| AUS | Thanasi Kokkinakis | Australian internal selection |
| AUS | John Millman | Australian internal selection |
| AUS | Luke Saville | Australian internal selection |

=== Women's singles ===
| Country | Name | Method of qualification |
|---|---|---|
| TPE | Chang Kai-chen | Asia-Pacific Wildcard Playoff |
| FRA | Océane Dodin | French internal selection |
| USA | Irina Falconi | American Wildcard Challenge |
| AUS | Daria Gavrilova | Australian Wildcard Playoff |
| AUS | Arina Rodionova | Australian internal selection |
| AUS | Olivia Rogowska | Australian internal selection |
| AUS | Storm Sanders | Australian internal selection |
| CHN | Duan Yingying | Australian internal selection |

=== Men's doubles ===
| Country | Name | Method of qualification |
|---|---|---|
| TPE; CHN | Lee Hsin-han; Zhang Ze | Asia-Pacific Wildcard Playoff |
| AUS; AUS | Alex Bolt; Andrew Whittington | Australian internal selection |
| AUS; AUS | James Duckworth; Luke Saville | Australian internal selection |
| AUS; AUS | Matthew Ebden; Matt Reid | Australian internal selection |
| AUS; AUS | Omar Jasika; John-Patrick Smith | Australian internal selection |
| AUS; AUS | Thanasi Kokkinakis; Nick Kyrgios | Australian internal selection |
| AUS; AUS | John Millman; Benjamin Mitchell | Australian internal selection |

=== Women's doubles ===
| Country | Name | Method of qualification |
|---|---|---|
| CHN; CHN | Yang Zhaoxuan; Ye Qiuyu | Asia-Pacific Wildcard Playoff |
| AUS; AUS | Monique Adamczak; Olivia Rogowska | Australian internal selection |
| AUS; AUS | Naiktha Bains; Sara Tomic | Australian internal selection |
| AUS; AUS | Kimberly Birrell; Priscilla Hon | Australian internal selection |
| AUS; AUS | Daria Gavrilova; Storm Sanders | Australian internal selection |
| AUS; AUS | Maddison Inglis; Alexandra Nancarrow | Australian internal selection |
| AUS; AUS | Jessica Moore; Abbie Myers | Australian internal selection |

=== Mixed doubles ===
| Country | Name | Method of qualification |
|---|---|---|
| AUS; AUS | Sam Thompson; Masa Jovanovic | Australian Wildcard Playoff |
| TPE; CHN | Chang Kai-chen; Zhang Ze | Australian internal selection |
| AUS; AUS | Casey Dellacqua; John Peers | Australian internal selection |
| AUS; IND | Jarmila Gajdošová; Mahesh Bhupathi | Australian internal selection |
| AUS; AUS | Daria Gavrilova; Luke Saville | Australian internal selection |
| SLO; AUS | Andreja Klepač; Chris Guccione | Australian internal selection |
| AUS; BLR | Arina Rodionova; Max Mirnyi | Australian internal selection |

== Asia-Pacific Wildcard Playoff ==
The Asia-Pacific Wildcard Playoff events took place in Shenzhen, Guangdong, China from Monday, November 24 to Sunday, November 30, 2014. A total of 21 male and 32 female players from Asia/Pacific zone took part in singles events (including qualifying competitions), with Zhang Ze from China and Chang Kai-chen from Chinese Taipei gaining the Australian Open entry. Both doubles events consisted of 12 teams each, with Lee Hsin-han & Zhang Ze and Yang Zhaoxuan & Ye Qiuyu winning the wild cards. Junior playoff events were also held, and Chinese players Wu Yibing and Gao Xinyu won the wild card entries into the Boys' and Girls' main events, respectively.

=== Men's singles ===
First round
1 | (Japan) Hiroki Moriya | 6^{3} | 4
Q | (India) Purav Raja | 7^{7} | 6
WC | (China) Gong Maoxin | 6 | 4 | 3
(China) Wu Di | 3 | 6 | 6
(India) Yuki Bhambri | 7^{7} | 6
Q | (New Zealand) Wesley Whitehouse | 6^{3} | 3
(China) Wang Chuhan | 2 | 3
4 | (China) Zhang Ze | 6 | 6
3 | (South Korea) Chung Hyeon | 6 | 6
WC | (China) Zhao Cai | 2 | 0
WC | (South Korea) Ji-Sung Nam | 6 | 6
Q | (China) Xi Qi | 1 | 1
(China) Li Zhe | 7^{7} | 6
WC | (Japan) Bumpei Sato | 6^{4} | 4
Q | (Japan) Sho Katayama | 6 | 1 | 4
2 | (Japan) Yoshihito Nishioka | 3 | 6 | 6

Quarterfinals
Q | (India) Purav Raja | 6 | 4 | 6
(China) Wu Di | 4 | 6 | 3
(India) Yuki Bhambri | 2 | 1
4 | (China) Zhang Ze | 6 | 6
3 | (South Korea) Chung Hyeon | 4 | 6 | 6
WC | (South Korea) Ji-Sung Nam | 6 | 4 | 3
(China) Li Zhe | 6 | 6
2 | (Japan) Yoshihito Nishioka | 2 | 4

Semifinals
Q | (India) Purav Raja | 3 | 3
4 | (China) Zhang Ze | 6 | 6
3 | (South Korea) Chung Hyeon | 3 | 5
(China) Li Zhe | 6 | 7

Final
4 | (China) Zhang Ze | 6 | 6
(China) Li Zhe | 4 | 4

=== Women's singles ===
First round
1 | (China) Zhu Lin | 0 | 4
(Thailand) Tamarine Tanasugarn | 6 | 6
Q | (China) Wang Yan | 1 | 3
(Japan) Nao Hibino | 6 | 6
4 | (Japan) Miharu Imanishi | 6 | 6
WC | (China) Zhang Yuxuan | 4 | 3
Q | (Chinese Taipei) Chan Chin-wei | 1 | 5
WC | (China) Xu Shilin | 6 | 7
WC | (Chinese Taipei) Chang Kai-chen | 6 | 6
Q | (Chinese Taipei) Lee Ya-hsuan | 3 | 3
(Japan) Rika Fujiwara | 6 | 2 | 7
3 | (China) Zhang Kailin | 4 | 6 | 5
(China) Yang Zhaoxuan | 3 | 6^{5}
WC | (South Korea) Jang Su-jeong | 6 | 7^{7}
Q | (India) Ankita Raina | 2 | 1
2 | (Japan) Eri Hozumi | 6 | 6

Quarterfinals
(Thailand) Tamarine Tanasugarn | 6 | 6
(Japan) Nao Hibino | 0 | 0
4 | (Japan) Miharu Imanishi | 6 | 2 | 4
WC | (China) Xu Shilin | 3 | 6 | 6
WC | (Chinese Taipei) Chang Kai-chen | 6 | 6
(Japan) Rika Fujiwara | 1 | 3
WC | (South Korea) Jang Su-jeong | 3 | 6^{2}
2 | (Japan) Eri Hozumi | 6 | 7^{7}

Semifinals
(Thailand) Tamarine Tanasugarn | 3 | 6 | 6
WC | (China) Xu Shilin | 6 | 1 | 2
WC | (Chinese Taipei) Chang Kai-chen | 6 | 3 | 7
2 | (Japan) Eri Hozumi | 0 | 6 | 5

Final
(Thailand) Tamarine Tanasugarn | 3 | 0
WC | (Chinese Taipei) Chang Kai-chen | 6 | 6

=== Men's doubles ===
First round
WC | (China) Hao Wu (China) Yibing Wu | 7^{7} | 3 | [3]
(South Korea) Chung Hyeon (South Korea) Ji Sung Nam | 6^{4} | 6 | [10]
(China) Wang Chuhan (China) Wu Di | 6 | 6
(China) Zhao Cai (China) Changwei Peng | 2 | 3
WC | (China) Jia Qi Huang (China) Chuanqi Su | 3 | 3
WC | (New Zealand) Sergey Belov (New Zealand) Wesley Whitehouse | 6 | 6
(Japan) Sho Katayama (Japan) Bumpei Sato | 6 | 6
WC | (China) Xi Qi (China) Zihao Xia | 2 | 3

Quarterfinals
1 | (China) Gong Maoxin (Chinese Taipei) Peng Hsien-yin | 4 | 6 | [8]
(South Korea) Chung Hyeon (South Korea) Ji Sung Nam | 6 | 4 | [10]
4 | (Chinese Taipei) Lee Hsin-han (China) Zhang Ze | 6 | 6
(China) Wang Chuhan (China) Wu Di | 4 | 2
WC | (New Zealand) Sergey Belov (New Zealand) Wesley Whitehouse | 1 | 2
3 | (India) Yuki Bhambri (China) Li Zhe | 6 | 6
(Japan) Sho Katayama (Japan) Bumpei Sato | 6^{5} | 3
2 | (Philippines) Ruben Gonzales (India) Purav Raja | 7^{7} | 6

Semifinals
(South Korea) Chung Hyeon (South Korea) Ji Sung Nam | 3 | 4
4 | (Chinese Taipei) Lee Hsin-han (China) Zhang Ze | 6 | 6
3 | (India) Yuki Bhambri (China) Li Zhe | 7^{7} | 6^{5} | [8]
2 | (Philippines) Ruben Gonzales (India) Purav Raja | 6^{4} | 7^{7} | [10]

Final
4 | (Chinese Taipei) Lee Hsin-han (China) Zhang Ze | 2 | 6 | [10]
2 | (Philippines) Ruben Gonzales (India) Purav Raja | 6 | 1 | [8]

=== Women's doubles ===
First round
(China) Xu Shilin (China) Zhang Yuxuan | 6 | 3 | [12]
(Chinese Taipei) Chang Kai-chen (Thailand) Tamarine Tanasugarn | 3 | 6 | [10]
(China) You Xiaodi (China) Zhu Lin | 6 | 5 | [9]
WC | (Chinese Taipei) Lee Ya-hsuan (China) Zhang Ying | 1 | 7 | [11]
WC | (China) Yang Zhaoxuan (China) Ye Qiuyu | 3 | 6 | [10]
Alt | (China) Guo Xiaoxuan (China) Sun Xuliu | 6 | 4 | [3]
(South Korea) Jang Su-jeong (China) Zhang Kailin | 6 | 6
WC | (China) Li Yihong (China) Wang Yan | 4 | 4

Quarterfinals
1 | (Chinese Taipei) Chan Chin-wei (China) Liang Chen | 1 | 6 | [12]
(China) Xu Shilin (China) Zhang Yuxuan | 6 | 2 | [10]
4 | (Thailand) Nicha Lertpitaksinchai (Thailand) Peangtarn Plipuech | 3 | 6 | [10]
WC | (Chinese Taipei) Lee Ya-hsuan (China) Zhang Ying | 6 | 2 | [7]
WC | (China) Yang Zhaoxuan (China) Ye Qiuyu | 6 | 6
3 | (Japan) Rika Fujiwara (Chinese Taipei) Hsieh Shu-ying | 2 | 3
(South Korea) Jang Su-jeong (China) Zhang Kailin | 4 | 1
2 | (Japan) Eri Hozumi (Japan) Makoto Ninomiya | 6 | 6

Semifinals
1 | (Chinese Taipei) Chan Chin-wei (China) Liang Chen | 7^{7} | 6
4 | (Thailand) Nicha Lertpitaksinchai (Thailand) Peangtarn Plipuech | 6^{5} | 3
WC | (China) Yang Zhaoxuan (China) Ye Qiuyu | 6 | 6
2 | (Japan) Eri Hozumi (Japan) Makoto Ninomiya | 3 | 2

Final
1 | (Chinese Taipei) Chan Chin-wei (China) Liang Chen | 2 | 3
WC | (China) Yang Zhaoxuan (China) Ye Qiuyu | 6 | 6

== Australian Wildcard Playoff ==
The Australian Wildcard Playoff events took place in Melbourne Park in Melbourne, Victoria, Australia from Monday, December 15 to Sunday, December 21, 2014. A total of 16 male and 16 female Australian players took part in singles events, with Jordan Thompson and Daria Gavrilova gaining the Australian Open entry. Mixed Doubles event was played in a Round robin format, where 11 teams competed in two groups. The top four mixed doubles teams then played in a knock-out tournament, where Sam Thompson and Masa Jovanovic won the wild card.

=== Men's singles ===
First round
1 | (Australia) Luke Saville | 7^{7} | 6^{3} | 6 | 6
(Australia) Christopher O'Connell | 6^{4} | 7^{7} | 2 | 4
8 | (Australia) Gavin van Peperzeel | 6 | 6 | 6
(Australia) Mitchell Robins | 2 | 2 | 2
3 | (Australia) Alex Bolt | 6^{3} | 6^{4} | 6 | 6^{4}
WC | (Australia) Marc Polmans | 7^{7} | 7^{7} | 2 | 7^{7}
5 | (Australia) Jordan Thompson | 7^{7} | 6 | 5
WC | (Australia) Harry Bourchier | 6^{2} | 4 | 2^{r}
(Australia) Andrew Whittington | 6^{5} | 3 | 2
6 | (Australia) Dane Propoggia | 7^{7} | 6 | 6
WC | (Australia) Akira Santillan | 4 | 3 | 1
4 | (Australia) Benjamin Mitchell | 6 | 6 | 6
WC | (Australia) Blake Mott | 5 | 6 | 6 | 6
7 | (Australia) Maverick Banes | 7 | 2 | 1 | 3
(Australia) Jacob Grills | 4 | 6^{4} | 1
2 | (Australia) John-Patrick Smith | 6 | 7^{7} | 6

Quarterfinals
1 | (Australia) Luke Saville | 3 | 6 | 6 | 6
8 | (Australia) Gavin van Peperzeel | 6 | 3 | 4 | 4
WC | (Australia) Marc Polmans | 3 | 3 | 1
5 | (Australia) Jordan Thompson | 6 | 6 | 6
6 | (Australia) Dane Propoggia | 2 | 7^{7} | 4 | 4
4 | (Australia) Benjamin Mitchell | 6 | 6^{5} | 6 | 6
WC | (Australia) Blake Mott | 2 | 4 | 3
2 | (Australia) John-Patrick Smith | 6 | 6 | 6

Semifinals
1 | (Australia) Luke Saville
5 | (Australia) Jordan Thompson | w/o
4 | (Australia) Benjamin Mitchell | 4 | 4 | 4
2 | (Australia) John-Patrick Smith | 6 | 6 | 6

Final
5 | (Australia) Jordan Thompson | 6 | 6 | 1 | 6^{2} | 9
2 | (Australia) John-Patrick Smith | 1 | 3 | 6 | 7^{7} | 7

=== Women's singles ===
First round
1 | (Australia) Olivia Rogowska | 6 | 6
WC | (Australia) Seone Mendez | 1 | 0
8 | (Australia) Alison Bai | 1 | 6 | 7
(Australia) Isabella Holland | 6 | 2 | 5
3 | (Australia) Daria Gavrilova | 6 | 7^{7}
(Australia) Lizette Cabrera | 1 | 6^{2}
Alt | (Australia) Zoe Hives | 4 | 4
WC | (Australia) Abbie Myers | 6 | 6
WC | (Australia) Olivia Tjandramulia | 6^{6} | 6 | 6
5 | (Australia) Jessica Moore | 7^{8} | 3 | 4
WC | (Australia) Sara Tomic | 0 | 2
4 | (Australia) Arina Rodionova | 6 | 6
WC | (Australia) Maddison Inglis | 6 | 6
7 | (Australia) Alexandra Nancarrow | 3 | 1
WC | (Australia) Naiktha Bains | 6 | 3
2 | (Australia) Anastasia Rodionova | 4 | 1^{r}

Quarterfinals
1 | (Australia) Olivia Rogowska | 6 | 6
8 | (Australia) Alison Bai | 4 | 4
3 | (Australia) Daria Gavrilova | 6 | 6
WC | (Australia) Abbie Myers | 4 | 4
WC | (Australia) Olivia Tjandramulia | 3 | 4
4 | (Australia) Arina Rodionova | 6 | 6
WC | (Australia) Maddison Inglis | 6 | 0 | 3
WC | (Australia) Naiktha Bains | 3 | 6 | 6

Semifinals
1 | (Australia) Olivia Rogowska | 1 | 3
3 | (Australia) Daria Gavrilova | 6 | 6
4 | (Australia) Arina Rodionova | 6 | 6
WC | (Australia) Naiktha Bains | 3 | 1

Final
3 | (Australia) Daria Gavrilova | 6 | 6
4 | (Australia) Arina Rodionova | 4 | 2

=== Mixed doubles ===
| Semifinals | | Final |
| (Australia) Gavin van Peperzeel (Australia) Ashling Sumner | 4 |
| (Australia) Robert Kennedy (Australia) Kay-Leigh Nicholas | 1 | (Australia) Gavin van Peperzeel (Australia) Ashling Sumner | 1 |
| (Australia) Pat Flynn (Australia) Helen Parsons | 1 | (Australia) Sam Thompson (Australia) Masa Jovanovic | 4 |
| (Australia) Sam Thompson (Australia) Masa Jovanovic | 4 |

== American Wildcard Challenge ==
The Australian Open Wild Card Challenge for male players consisted of:

- Charlottesville Men's Pro Challenger (27 October – 2 November, Charlottesville, Virginia),
- Knoxville Challenger (3 November – 9 November, Knoxville, Tennessee),
- JSM Challenger of Champaign–Urbana (10 November – 17 November, Champaign, Illinois).

The Australian Open Wild Card Challenge for female players consisted of:

- USTA Tennis Classic of Macon (20 October – 26 October, Macon, Georgia),
- John Newcombe Women's Pro Challenge (27 October – 2 November, New Braunfels, Texas),
- South Seas Island Resort Women's Pro Classic (3 November – 9 November, Captiva Island, Florida).

Denis Kudla and Irina Falconi who earned the most ATP World Tour or WTA ranking points at those selected USTA Pro Circuit events received wild cards to compete in the 2015 Australian Open main draw.
