= Masa Jovanovic =

Australian tennis player

- Country (sports): Australia
- Residence: Werribee, Victoria, Australia
- Born: 23 November 1994 (age 30); Serbia
- Plays: Right-handed (two-handed backhand)
- Prize money: $1,340,899

Singles
- Career record: 103–84
- Career titles: 0
- Highest ranking: No. 518 (2 April 2018)

Doubles
- Career record: 32–47
- Career titles: 2 ITF
- Highest ranking: No. 518 (16 April 2018)

Grand Slam mixed doubles results
- Australian Open: 1R (2015)

Masa Jovanovic (Serbian: Maša Jovanović, Маша Јовановић; born 23 November 1994) is an Australian former tennis player born in Serbia.

Jovanovic has a career-high singles ranking of 518, achieved on 2 April 2018. She also has a career-high WTA doubles ranking of 518, reached on 16 April 2018. Over her career, she won two doubles titles on the ITF Circuit.

Alongside Samuel Thompson, Jovanovic won the mixed-doubles Wildcard Playoff into the 2015 Australian Open where they faced off against Martina Hingis and Leander Paes in the main draw, losing 2–6, 6–7^{(2–7)}.

In 2017, Jovanovic achieved a career-best singles result when she reached the quarterfinals of a $25k tournament in Goyang, South Korea. In late 2017, she reached the top 600 in singles for the first time.

In 2018, Jovanovic played her first WTA Tour tournament receiving a qualifying wildcard to the Hobart International. There, she won the opening set against former top-15 player Kirsten Flipkens before losing in three sets. In March, she achieved a new career-best singles result in the $25k tournament in Mildura, reaching the semifinals. In June, she won her first ITF final (her first title win was by walkover), partnering Jelena Stojanovic in Niš, Serbia.

== ITF finals ==
=== Doubles (2–1) ===
Legend $15,000 tournaments $10,000 tournaments	Finals by surface Hard (1–0) Clay (1–1)

Outcome	No.	Date	Tournament	Surface	Partner	Opponents	Score
Winner	1.	11 June 2016	Antalya, Turkey	Hard	(Netherlands) Phillis Vanenburg	(Slovenia) Nastja Kolar (United Kingdom) Francesca Stephenson	w/o
Runner-up	1.	22 July 2016	Prokuplje, Serbia	Clay	(Australia) Angelique Svinos	(Serbia) Tamara Čurović (Slovakia) Barbara Kötelesová	7–5, 3–6, [8–10]
Winner	2.	1 June 2018	Niš, Serbia	Clay	(Australia) Jelena Stojanovic	(Romania) Gabriela Duca (Ukraine) Yuliya Lysa	6–1, 7–6^{(2)}
