= 2015 Australian Open – Day-by-day summaries =

== Day 1 (19 January) ==
- Day 1 attendance: 71,171
- Seeds out:
  - Men's Singles: (Latvia) Ernests Gulbis [11], (Spain) Tommy Robredo [15]
  - Women's Singles: (Serbia) Ana Ivanovic [5], (Germany) Angelique Kerber [9], (Czech Republic) Lucie Šafářová [16], (Spain) Carla Suárez Navarro [17], (Russia) Anastasia Pavlyuchenkova [23], (Russia) Svetlana Kuznetsova [27], (Germany) Sabine Lisicki [28], (Switzerland) Belinda Bencic [32]
- Schedule of Play

Matches on main courts
Matches on Rod Laver Arena
Event	Winner	Loser	Score
Women's Singles 1st Round	(Romania) Simona Halep [3]	(Italy) Karin Knapp	6–3, 6–2
Women's Singles 1st Round	(Czech Republic) Lucie Hradecká [Q]	(Serbia) Ana Ivanovic [5]	1–6, 6–3, 6–2
Men's Singles 1st Round	(Spain) Rafael Nadal [3]	(Russia) Mikhail Youzhny	6–3, 6–2, 6–2
Men's Singles 1st Round	(Switzerland) Roger Federer [2]	(Chinese Taipei) Lu Yen-hsun	6–4, 6–2, 7–5
Women's Singles 1st Round	(Russia) Maria Sharapova [2]	(Croatia) Petra Martić [Q]	6–4, 6–1
Matches on Margaret Court Arena
Event	Winner	Loser	Score
Women's Singles 1st Round	(Australia) Jarmila Gajdošová	(Romania) Alexandra Dulgheru	6–3, 6–4
Men's Singles 1st Round	(United Kingdom) Andy Murray [6]	(India) Yuki Bhambri [Q]	6–3, 6–4, 7–6^{(7–3)}
Women's Singles 1st Round	(Romania) Irina-Camelia Begu	(Germany) Angelique Kerber [9]	6–4, 0–6, 6–1
Women's Singles 1st Round	(Canada) Eugenie Bouchard [7]	(Germany) Anna-Lena Friedsam	6–2, 6–4
Men's Singles 1st Round	(Australia) Nick Kyrgios	(Argentina) Federico Delbonis	7–6^{(7–2)}, 3–6, 6–3, 6–7^{(5–7)}, 6–3
Matches on Hisense Arena
Event	Winner	Loser	Score
Women's Singles 1st Round	(Germany) Julia Görges	(Switzerland) Belinda Bencic [32]	6–2, 6–1
Women's Singles 1st Round	(France) Kristina Mladenovic	(Germany) Sabine Lisicki [28]	4–6, 6–4, 6–2
Men's Singles 1st Round	(Australia) Bernard Tomic	(Germany) Tobias Kamke	7–5, 6–7^{(1–7)}, 6–3, 6–2
Men's Singles 1st Round	(Australia) Sam Groth	(Serbia) Filip Krajinović	6–3, 7–6^{(7–4)}, 6–4
Colored background indicates a night match
Matches start at 11:00 am; night matches do not start before 7:00 pm

== Day 2 (20 January) ==
- Day 2 attendance: 64,801
- Seeds out:
  - Men's Singles: (Italy) Fabio Fognini [16], (Ukraine) Alexandr Dolgopolov [21], (France) Julien Benneteau [25], (Uruguay) Pablo Cuevas [27]
  - Women's Singles: (Italy) Flavia Pennetta [12], (Germany) Andrea Petkovic [13], (Serbia) Jelena Janković [15]
- Schedule of Play

Matches on main courts
Matches on Rod Laver Arena
Event	Winner	Loser	Score
Women's Singles 1st Round	(Australia) Samantha Stosur [20]	(Romania) Monica Niculescu	6–4, 6–1
Men's Singles 1st Round	(Switzerland) Stan Wawrinka [4]	(Turkey) Marsel İlhan	6–1, 6–4, 6–2
Men's Singles 1st Round	(Serbia) Novak Djokovic [1]	(Slovenia) Aljaž Bedene [Q]	6–3, 6–2, 6–4
Men's Singles 1st Round	(Australia) Lleyton Hewitt	(China) Zhang Ze [WC]	6–3, 1–6, 6–0, 6–4
Women's Singles 1st Round	(Australia) Ajla Tomljanović	(United States) Shelby Rogers	4–6, 6–4, 6–0
Matches on Margaret Court Arena
Event	Winner	Loser	Score
Men's Singles 1st Round	(Japan) Kei Nishikori [5]	(Spain) Nicolás Almagro	6–4, 7–6^{(7–1)}, 6–2
Women's Singles 1st Round	(Denmark) Caroline Wozniacki [8]	(United States) Taylor Townsend	7–6^{(7–1)}, 6–2
Women's Singles 1st Round	(Australia) Casey Dellacqua [29]	(Austria) Yvonne Meusburger	6–4, 6–0
Women's Singles 1st Round	(United States) Serena Williams [1]	(Belgium) Alison Van Uytvanck	6–0, 6–4
Men's Singles 1st Round	(France) Gaël Monfils [17]	(France) Lucas Pouille [WC]	6–7^{(3–7)}, 3–6, 6–4, 6–1, 6–4
Matches on Hisense Arena
Event	Winner	Loser	Score
Women's Singles 1st Round	(Belarus) Victoria Azarenka	(United States) Sloane Stephens	6–3, 6–2
Men's Singles 1st Round	(Canada) Milos Raonic [8]	(Ukraine) Illya Marchenko [Q]	7–6^{(7–3)}, 7–6^{(7–3)}, 6–3
Women's Singles 1st Round	(Czech Republic) Petra Kvitová [4]	(Netherlands) Richèl Hogenkamp [Q]	6–1, 6–4
Women's Singles 1st Round	(United States) Venus Williams [18]	(Spain) María Teresa Torró Flor	6–2, 6–2
Men's Singles 1st Round	(Canada) Vasek Pospisil	(United States) Sam Querrey	6–3, 6–7^{(5–7)}, 2–6, 6–4, 6–4
Colored background indicates a night match
Matches start at 11:00 am; night matches do not start before 7:00 pm

== Day 3 (21 January) ==
- Day 3 attendance: 72,954
- Seeds out:
  - Men's Singles: (Belgium) David Goffin [20], (Germany) Philipp Kohlschreiber, [22] (Croatia) Ivo Karlović [23], (Argentina) Leonardo Mayer [26], (Czech Republic) Lukáš Rosol [28], (France) Jérémy Chardy [29], (Slovakia) Martin Kližan [32]
  - Men's Doubles: (Spain) Marcel Granollers / (Spain) Marc López [3], (Croatia) Marin Draganja / (Finland) Henri Kontinen [15]
  - Women's Doubles: (Chinese Taipei) Chan Hao-ching / (Czech Republic) Květa Peschke [8]
- Schedule of Play

Matches on main courts
Matches on Rod Laver Arena
Event	Winner	Loser	Score
Women's Singles 2nd Round	(Russia) Ekaterina Makarova [10]	(Italy) Roberta Vinci	6–2, 6–4
Women's Singles 2nd Round	(Russia) Maria Sharapova [2]	(Russia) Alexandra Panova [Q]	6–1, 4–6, 7–5
Men's Singles 2nd Round	(Switzerland) Roger Federer [2]	(Italy) Simone Bolelli	3–6, 6–3, 6–2, 6–2
Men's Singles 2nd Round	(Spain) Rafael Nadal [3]	(United States) Tim Smyczek [Q]	6–2, 3–6, 6–7^{(2–7)}, 6–3, 7–5
Women's Singles 2nd Round	(Romania) Simona Halep [3]	(Australia) Jarmila Gajdošová	6–2, 6–2
Matches on Margaret Court Arena
Event	Winner	Loser	Score
Women's Singles 2nd Round	(Germany) Julia Görges	(Czech Republic) Klára Koukalová	6–3, 4–6, 6–2
Men's Singles 2nd Round	(United Kingdom) Andy Murray [6]	(Australia) Marinko Matosevic	6–1, 6–3, 6–2
Women's Singles 2nd Round	(Italy) Sara Errani [14]	(Spain) Silvia Soler Espinosa	7–6^{(7–3)}, 6–3
Women's Singles 2nd Round	(Canada) Eugenie Bouchard [7]	(Netherlands) Kiki Bertens	6–0, 6–3
Men's Singles 2nd Round	(Australia) Bernard Tomic	(Germany) Philipp Kohlschreiber [22]	6–7^{(5–7)}, 6–4, 7–6^{(8–6)}, 7–6^{(7–5)}
Matches on Hisense Arena
Event	Winner	Loser	Score
Women's Singles 2nd Round	(China) Peng Shuai [21]	(Slovakia) Magdalena Rybáriková	6–1, 6–1
Women's Singles 2nd Round	(Czech Republic) Karolína Plíšková [22]	(France) Océane Dodin [WC]	7–5, 5–7, 6–4
Men's Singles 2nd Round	(Bulgaria) Grigor Dimitrov [10]	(Slovakia) Lukáš Lacko	6–3, 6–7^{(10–12)}, 6–3, 6–3
Men's Singles 2nd Round	(Australia) Sam Groth	(Australia) Thanasi Kokkinakis [WC]	3–6, 6–3, 7–5, 3–6, 6–1
Colored background indicates a night match
Matches start at 11:00 am; night matches do not start before 7:00 pm

== Day 4 (22 January) ==
- Day 4 attendance:
- Seeds out:
  - Men's Singles: (Spain) Roberto Bautista Agut [13], (France) Gaël Monfils [17], (Colombia) Santiago Giraldo [30]
  - Women's Singles: (Denmark) Caroline Wozniacki [8], (Australia) Samantha Stosur [20], (Australia) Casey Dellacqua [29]
- Schedule of Play

Matches on main courts
Matches on Rod Laver Arena
Event	Winner	Loser	Score
Women's Singles 2nd Round	(Poland) Agnieszka Radwańska [6]	(Sweden) Johanna Larsson	6–0, 6–1
Women's Singles 2nd Round	(United States) Serena Williams [1]	(Russia) Vera Zvonareva [PR]	7–5, 6–0
Men's Singles 2nd Round	(Serbia) Novak Djokovic [1]	(Russia) Andrey Kuznetsov	6–0, 6–1, 6–4
Men's Doubles 1st Round	(Spain) Feliciano López (Belarus) Max Mirnyi	(Australia) James Duckworth [WC] (Australia) Luke Saville [WC]	7–6^{(7–1)}, 6–7^{(5–7)}, 6–2
Men's Singles 2nd Round	(Germany) Benjamin Becker	(Australia) Lleyton Hewitt	2–6, 1–6, 6–3, 6–4, 6–2
Women's Singles 2nd Round	(United States) Coco Vandeweghe	(Australia) Samantha Stosur [20]	6–4, 6–4
Matches on Margaret Court Arena
Event	Winner	Loser	Score
Women's Singles 2nd Round	(United States) Venus Williams [18]	(United States) Lauren Davis	6–2, 6–3
Men's Singles 2nd Round	(Switzerland) Stan Wawrinka [4]	(Romania) Marius Copil [Q]	7–6^{(7-4)}, 7–6^{(7-4)}, 6–3
Women's Singles 2nd Round	(United States) Madison Keys	(Australia) Casey Dellacqua [29]	2–6, 6–1, 6–1
Women's Singles 2nd Round	(Belarus) Victoria Azarenka	(Denmark) Caroline Wozniacki [8]	6–4, 6–2
Men's Singles 2nd Round	(Canada) Milos Raonic [8]	(United States) Donald Young	6–4, 7–6^{(7-3)}, 6–3
Matches on Hisense Arena
Event	Winner	Loser	Score
Men's Singles 2nd Round	(Japan) Kei Nishikori [5]	(Croatia) Ivan Dodig	4–6, 7–5, 6–2, 7–6^{(7–0)}
Women's Singles 2nd Round	(Slovakia) Dominika Cibulková [11]	(Bulgaria) Tsvetana Pironkova	6–2, 6–0
Women's Singles 2nd Round	(Czech Republic) Petra Kvitová [4]	(Germany) Mona Barthel	6–2, 6–4
Men's Singles 2nd Round	(Poland) Jerzy Janowicz	(France) Gaël Monfils [17]	6–4, 1–6, 6–7^{(3–7)}, 6–3, 6–3
Colored background indicates a night match
Matches start at 11:00 am; night matches do not start before 7:00 pm

== Day 5 (23 January) ==
- Day 5 attendance:
- Seeds out:
  - Men's Singles: (Switzerland) Roger Federer [2], (France) Richard Gasquet [24]
  - Women's Singles: (Italy) Sara Errani [14], (Czech Republic) Karolína Plíšková [22], (Kazakhstan) Zarina Diyas [31]
  - Men's Doubles: (India) Rohan Bopanna / (Canada) Daniel Nestor [7], (South Africa) Raven Klaasen / (India) Leander Paes [10], (Austria) Julian Knowle / (Canada) Vasek Pospisil [13]
  - Women's Doubles: (Chinese Taipei) Hsieh Su-wei / (India) Sania Mirza [2], (Spain) Garbiñe Muguruza / (Spain) Carla Suárez Navarro [6], (Japan) Kimiko Date-Krumm / (Australia) Casey Dellacqua [15]
- Schedule of Play

Matches on main courts
Matches on Rod Laver Arena
Event	Winner	Loser	Score
Women's Singles 3rd Round	(Germany) Julia Görges	(Czech Republic) Lucie Hradecká [Q]	7–6^{(8–6)}, 7–5
Women's Singles 3rd Round	(Canada) Eugenie Bouchard [7]	(France) Caroline Garcia	7–5, 6–0
Men's Singles 3rd Round	(Italy) Andreas Seppi	(Switzerland) Roger Federer [2]	6–4, 7–6^{(7–5)}, 4–6, 7–6^{(7–5)}
Women's Singles 3rd Round	(Russia) Maria Sharapova [2]	(Kazakhstan) Zarina Diyas [31]	6–1, 6–1
Men's Singles 3rd Round	(Spain) Rafael Nadal [3]	(Israel) Dudi Sela	6–1, 6–0, 7–5
Matches on Margaret Court Arena
Event	Winner	Loser	Score
Women's Singles 3rd Round	(Russia) Ekaterina Makarova [10]	(Czech Republic) Karolína Plíšková [22]	6–4, 6–4
Men's Singles 3rd Round	(Czech Republic) Tomáš Berdych [7]	(Serbia) Viktor Troicki	6–4, 6–3, 6–4
Women's Singles 3rd Round	(Romania) Simona Halep [3]	(United States) Bethanie Mattek-Sands [PR]	6–4, 7–5
Men's Singles 3rd Round	(Australia) Nick Kyrgios	(Tunisia) Malek Jaziri	6–4, 7–6^{(8–6)}, 6–1
Women's Doubles 2nd Round	(Switzerland) Martina Hingis [4] (Italy) Flavia Pennetta [4]	(Slovakia) Daniela Hantuchová (Italy) Karin Knapp	6–3, 6–7^{(5–7)}, 6–2
Matches on Hisense Arena
Event	Winner	Loser	Score
Women's Singles 3rd Round	(Belgium) Yanina Wickmayer	(Italy) Sara Errani [14]	4–6, 6–4, 6–3
Women's Singles 3rd Round	(Romania) Irina-Camelia Begu	(Germany) Carina Witthöft	6–4, 6–4
Men's Singles 3rd Round	(United Kingdom) Andy Murray [6]	(Portugal) João Sousa	6–1, 6–1, 7–5
Men's Singles 3rd Round	(Australia) Bernard Tomic	(Australia) Sam Groth	6–4, 7–6^{(10–8)}, 6–3
Colored background indicates a night match
Matches start at 11:00 am; night matches do not start before 7:00 pm

== Day 6 (24 January) ==
- Day 6 attendance: 81,031
- Seeds out:
  - Men's Singles: (France) Gilles Simon [18], (United States) John Isner [19], (Spain) Fernando Verdasco [31]
  - Women's Singles: (Czech Republic) Petra Kvitová [4], (France) Alizé Cornet [19], (Czech Republic) Barbora Záhlavová-Strýcová [25], (Ukraine) Elina Svitolina [26], (United States) Varvara Lepchenko [30]
  - Men's Doubles: (Austria) Alexander Peya / (Brazil) Bruno Soares [5], (Sweden) Robert Lindstedt / (Poland) Marcin Matkowski [9], (Colombia) Juan Sebastián Cabal / (Colombia) Robert Farah [11]
  - Women's Doubles: (Hungary) Tímea Babos / (France) Kristina Mladenovic [10], (Spain) Anabel Medina Garrigues / (Kazakhstan) Yaroslava Shvedova [11]
  - Mixed Doubles: (Kazakhstan) Yaroslava Shvedova / (Serbia) Nenad Zimonjić [6]
- Schedule of Play

Matches on main courts
Matches on Rod Laver Arena
Event	Winner	Loser	Score
Women's Singles 3rd Round	(Poland) Agnieszka Radwańska [6]	(United States) Varvara Lepchenko [30]	6–0, 7–5
Women's Singles 3rd Round	(United States) Serena Williams [1]	(Ukraine) Elina Svitolina [26]	4–6, 6–2, 6–0
Men's Singles 3rd Round	(Switzerland) Stan Wawrinka [4]	(Finland) Jarkko Nieminen	6–4, 6–2, 6–4
Men's Singles 3rd Round	(Serbia) Novak Djokovic [1]	(Spain) Fernando Verdasco [31]	7–6^{(10–8)}, 6–3, 6–4
Women's Singles 3rd Round	(United States) Madison Keys	(Czech Republic) Petra Kvitová [4]	6–4, 7–5
Matches on Margaret Court Arena
Event	Winner	Loser	Score
Women's Singles 3rd Round	(United States) Venus Williams [18]	(Italy) Camila Giorgi	4–6, 7–6^{(7–3)}, 6–1
Men's Singles 3rd Round	(Spain) Feliciano López [12]	(Poland) Jerzy Janowicz	7–6^{(8–6)}, 6–4, 7–6^{(7–3)}
Women's Singles 3rd Round	(Belarus) Victoria Azarenka	(Czech Republic) Barbora Záhlavová-Strýcová [25]	6–4, 6–4
Men's Singles 3rd Round	(Spain) David Ferrer [9]	(France) Gilles Simon [18]	6–2, 7–5, 5–7, 7–6^{(7–4)}
Men's Doubles 2nd Round	(United States) Bob Bryan [1] (United States) Mike Bryan [1]	(Argentina) Carlos Berlocq (Argentina) Leonardo Mayer	5–7, 6–3, 6–1
Matches on Hisense Arena
Event	Winner	Loser	Score
Women's Singles 3rd Round	(Spain) Garbiñe Muguruza [24]	(Switzerland) Timea Bacsinszky	6–3, 4–6, 6–0
Men's Singles 3rd Round	(Canada) Milos Raonic [8]	(Germany) Benjamin Becker	6–4, 6–3, 6–3
Women's Singles 3rd Round	(United States) Madison Brengle	(United States) Coco Vandeweghe	6–3, 6–2
Men's Singles 3rd Round	(Japan) Kei Nishikori [5]	(United States) Steve Johnson	6–7^{(9–7)}, 6–1, 6–2, 6–3
Colored background indicates a night match
Matches start at 11:00 am; night matches do not start before 7:00 pm

== Day 7 (25 January) ==
- Day 7 attendance:
- Seeds out:
  - Men's Singles: (Bulgaria) Grigor Dimitrov [10], (South Africa) Kevin Anderson [14]
  - Women's Singles: (China) Peng Shuai [21]
  - Men's Doubles: (Pakistan) Aisam-ul-Haq Qureshi / (Serbia) Nenad Zimonjić [8]
  - Women's Doubles: (Czech Republic) Andrea Hlaváčková / (Czech Republic) Lucie Hradecká [9], (Russia) Alla Kudryavtseva / (Russia) Anastasia Pavlyuchenkova [12]
  - Mixed Doubles: (Czech Republic) Květa Peschke / (Poland) Marcin Matkowski [8]
- Schedule of Play

Matches on main courts
Matches on Rod Laver Arena
Event	Winner	Loser	Score
Women's Singles 4th Round	(Canada) Eugenie Bouchard [7]	(Romania) Irina-Camelia Begu	6–1, 5–7, 6–2
Women's Singles 4th Round	(Russia) Maria Sharapova [2]	(China) Peng Shuai [21]	6–3, 6–0
Men's Singles 4th Round	(Spain) Rafael Nadal [3]	(South Africa) Kevin Anderson [14]	7–5, 6–1, 6–4
Women's Singles 4th Round	(Romania) Simona Halep [3]	(Belgium) Yanina Wickmayer	6–4, 6–2
Men's Singles 4th Round	(United Kingdom) Andy Murray [6]	(Bulgaria) Grigor Dimitrov [10]	6–4, 6–7^{(5–7)}, 6–3, 7–5
Matches on Margaret Court Arena
Event	Winner	Loser	Score
Women's Doubles 3rd Round	(Netherlands) Kiki Bertens [Alt] (Sweden) Johanna Larsson [Alt]	(Russia) Svetlana Kuznetsova (Australia) Samantha Stosur	7–6^{(7–5)}, 6–3
Women's Singles 4th Round	(Russia) Ekaterina Makarova [10]	(Germany) Julia Görges	6–3, 6–2
Men's Singles 4th Round	(Czech Republic) Tomáš Berdych [7]	(Australia) Bernard Tomic	6–2, 7–6^{(7–3)}, 6–2
Mixed Doubles 1st Round	(United States) Lisa Raymond (Sweden) Robert Lindstedt	(Australia) Anastasia Rodionova (Colombia) Robert Farah	6–3, 6–2
Matches on Hisense Arena
Event	Winner	Loser	Score
Men's Legends Doubles	(Australia) Wayne Arthurs (Australia) Pat Cash	(Croatia) Goran Ivanišević (Croatia) Ivan Ljubičić	4–1, 4–3, 1–4, 4–2
Men's Doubles 3rd Round	(Uruguay) Pablo Cuevas (Spain) David Marrero	(Australia) Alex Bolt [WC] (Australia) Andrew Whittington [WC]	7–6^{(9–7)}, 7–6^{(7–3)}
Mixed Doubles 1st Round	(Australia) Casey Dellacqua [WC] (Australia) John Peers [WC]	(Czech Republic) Květa Peschke [8] (Poland) Marcin Matkowski [8]	7–5, 6–4
Exhibition Doubles	(Australia) Maverick Banes (Australia) Gavin van Peperzeel	(Australia) Luke Saville (Australia) Jeremy Beale	4–3^{(5–4)}, 1–4
Men's Singles 4th Round	(Australia) Nick Kyrgios	(Italy) Andreas Seppi	5–7, 4–6, 6–3, 7–6^{(7–5)}, 8–6
Colored background indicates a night match
Matches start at 11:00 am; night matches do not start before 7:00 pm

== Day 8 (26 January) ==
- Day 8 attendance:
- Seeds out:
  - Men's Singles: (Spain) David Ferrer [9], (Spain) Feliciano López [12]
  - Women's Singles: (Poland) Agnieszka Radwańska [6], (Spain) Garbiñe Muguruza [24]
  - Men's Doubles: (United States) Bob Bryan / (United States) Mike Bryan [1], (United States) Eric Butorac / (Australia) Samuel Groth [12], (United Kingdom) Jamie Murray / (Australia) John Peers [16]
  - Women's Doubles: (Italy) Sara Errani / (Italy) Roberta Vinci [1], (Switzerland) Martina Hingis / (Italy) Flavia Pennetta [4], (France) Caroline Garcia / (Slovenia) Katarina Srebotnik [7]
- Schedule of Play

Matches on main courts
Matches on Rod Laver Arena
Event	Winner	Loser	Score
Women's Singles 4th Round	(Slovakia) Dominika Cibulková [11]	(Belarus) Victoria Azarenka	6–2, 3–6, 6–3
Women's Singles 4th Round	(United States) Serena Williams [1]	(Spain) Garbiñe Muguruza [24]	2–6, 6–3, 6–2
Men's Singles 4th Round	(Japan) Kei Nishikori [5]	(Spain) David Ferrer [9]	6–3, 6–3, 6–3
Women's Singles 4th Round	(United States) Venus Williams [18]	(Poland) Agnieszka Radwańska [6]	6–3, 2–6, 6–1
Men's Singles 4th Round	(Serbia) Novak Djokovic [1]	(Luxembourg) Gilles Müller	6–4, 7–5, 7–5
Matches on Margaret Court Arena
Event	Winner	Loser	Score
Men's Legends Doubles	(Sweden) Jonas Björkman (Sweden) Thomas Johansson	(Australia) Todd Woodbridge (Australia) Mark Woodforde	4–3^{(5–2)}, 4–1, 3–4^{(4–6)}, 4–3^{(5–0)}
Men's Singles 4th Round	(Switzerland) Stan Wawrinka [4]	(Spain) Guillermo García-López	7–6^{(7–2)}, 6–4, 4–6, 7–6^{(10–8)}
Women's Singles 4th Round	(United States) Madison Keys	(United States) Madison Brengle	6–2, 6–4
Matches on Hisense Arena
Event	Winner	Loser	Score
Men's Doubles 3rd Round	(Netherlands) Jean-Julien Rojer [6] (Romania) Horia Tecău [6]	(United States) Eric Butorac [12] (Australia) Samuel Groth [12]	3–6, 7–5, 7–6^{(7–5)}
Women's Doubles 3rd Round	(Chinese Taipei) Chan Yung-jan [14] (China) Zheng Jie [14]	(Switzerland) Martina Hingis [4] (Italy) Flavia Pennetta [4]	6–3, 6–3
Men's Doubles 3rd Round	(United Kingdom) Dominic Inglot [14] (Romania) Florin Mergea [14]	(United States) Bob Bryan [1] (United States) Mike Bryan [1]	7–6^{(7–4)}, 6–3
Men's Singles 4th Round	(Canada) Milos Raonic [8]	(Spain) Feliciano López [12]	6–4, 4–6, 6–3, 6–7^{(7–9)}, 6–3
Colored background indicates a night match
Matches start at 11:00 am; night matches do not start before 7:00 pm

== Day 9 (27 January) ==
- Day 9 attendance:
- Seeds out:
  - Men's Singles: (Spain) Rafael Nadal [3]
  - Women's Singles: (Romania) Simona Halep [3], (Canada) Eugenie Bouchard [7]
  - Men's Doubles: (France) Julien Benneteau / (France) Édouard Roger-Vasselin [2]
  - Women's Doubles: (Russia) Ekaterina Makarova / (Russia) Elena Vesnina [3], (United States) Raquel Kops-Jones / (United States) Abigail Spears [5]
- Schedule of Play

Matches on main courts
Matches on Rod Laver Arena
Event	Winner	Loser	Score
Women's Singles Quarterfinals	(Russia) Ekaterina Makarova [10]	(Romania) Simona Halep [3]	6–4, 6–0
Women's Singles Quarterfinals	(Russia) Maria Sharapova [2]	(Canada) Eugenie Bouchard [7]	6–3, 6–2
Men's Singles Quarterfinals	(Czech Republic) Tomáš Berdych [7]	(Spain) Rafael Nadal [3]	6–2, 6–0, 7–6^{(7–5)}
Men's Singles Quarterfinals	(United Kingdom) Andy Murray [6]	(Australia) Nick Kyrgios	6–3, 7–6^{(7–5)}, 6–3
Mixed Doubles 2nd Round	(Australia) Casey Dellacqua [WC] (Australia) John Peers [WC]	(Slovenia) Andreja Klepač [WC] (Australia) Chris Guccione [WC]	3–6, 6–3, [10–5]
Matches on Margaret Court Arena
Event	Winner	Loser	Score
Men's Doubles Quarterfinals	(France) Pierre-Hugues Herbert (France) Nicolas Mahut	(France) Julien Benneteau [2] (France) Édouard Roger-Vasselin [2]	7–6^{(7–5)}, 3–6, 6–3
Women's Doubles Quarterfinals	(Germany) Julia Görges [16] (Germany) Anna-Lena Grönefeld [16]	(Netherlands) Kiki Bertens [Alt] (Sweden) Johanna Larsson [Alt]	6–2, 7–5
Women's Doubles Quarterfinals	(Chinese Taipei) Chan Yung-jan [14] (China) Zheng Jie [14]	(Poland) Klaudia Jans-Ignacik (Slovenia) Andreja Klepač	6–1, 6–2
Mixed Doubles 2nd Round	(France) Kristina Mladenovic [3] (Canada) Daniel Nestor [3]	(Netherlands) Michaëlla Krajicek (Romania) Florin Mergea	6–4, 7–5
Colored background indicates a night match
Matches start at 11:00 am; night matches do not start before 7:00 pm

== Day 10 (28 January) ==
- Day 10 attendance:
- Seeds out:
  - Men's Singles: (Japan) Kei Nishikori [5], (Canada) Milos Raonic [8]
  - Women's Singles: (Slovakia) Dominika Cibulková [11], (United States) Venus Williams [18]
  - Men's Doubles: (United Kingdom) Dominic Inglot / (Romania) Florin Mergea [14]
  - Women's Doubles: (Netherlands) Michaëlla Krajicek / (Czech Republic) Barbora Záhlavová-Strýcová [13], (Germany) Julia Görges / (Germany) Anna-Lena Grönefeld [16]
  - Mixed Doubles: (Czech Republic) Andrea Hlaváčková / (Austria) Alexander Peya [4]
- Schedule of Play

Matches on main courts
Matches on Rod Laver Arena
Event	Winner	Loser	Score
Women's Singles Quarterfinals	(United States) Madison Keys	(United States) Venus Williams [18]	6–3, 4–6, 6–4
Women's Singles Quarterfinals	(United States) Serena Williams [1]	(Slovakia) Dominika Cibulková [11]	6–2, 6–2
Men's Singles Quarterfinals	(Switzerland) Stan Wawrinka [4]	(Japan) Kei Nishikori [5]	6–3, 6–4, 7–6^{(8–6)}
Men's Singles Quarterfinals	(Serbia) Novak Djokovic [1]	(Canada) Milos Raonic [8]	7–6^{(7–5)}, 6–4, 6–2
Mixed Doubles Quarterfinals	(Switzerland) Martina Hingis [7] (India) Leander Paes [7]	(Czech Republic) Andrea Hlaváčková [4] (Austria) Alexander Peya [4]	6–3, 6–1
Matches on Margaret Court Arena
Event	Winner	Loser	Score
Men's Doubles Quarterfinals	(Italy) Simone Bolelli (Italy) Fabio Fognini	(Uruguay) Pablo Cuevas (Spain) David Marrero	7–6^{(7–5)}, 7–6^{(7–5)}
Women's Doubles Semifinals	(Chinese Taipei) Chan Yung-jan [14] (China) Zheng Jie [14]	(Netherlands) Michaëlla Krajicek [13] (Czech Republic) Barbora Záhlavová-Strýcová [13]	6–3, 6–2
Colored background indicates a night match
Matches start at 11:00 am; night matches do not start before 7:30 pm

== Day 11 (29 January) ==
- Day 11 attendance:
- Seeds out:
  - Men's Singles: (Czech Republic) Tomáš Berdych [7]
  - Women's Singles: (Russia) Ekaterina Makarova [10]
  - Men's Doubles: (Croatia) Ivan Dodig / (Brazil) Marcelo Melo [4], (Netherlands) Jean-Julien Rojer / (Romania) Horia Tecău [6]
  - Mixed Doubles: (Slovenia) Katarina Srebotnik / (Brazil) Marcelo Melo [2], (Zimbabwe) Cara Black / (Colombia) Juan Sebastián Cabal [5]
- Schedule of Play

Matches on main courts
Matches on Rod Laver Arena
Event	Winner	Loser	Score
Men's Doubles Semifinals	(Italy) Simone Bolelli (Italy) Fabio Fognini	(Netherlands) Jean-Julien Rojer [6] (Romania) Horia Tecău [6]	6–4, 3–6, 6–3
Women's Singles Semifinals	(Russia) Maria Sharapova [2]	(Russia) Ekaterina Makarova [10]	6–3, 6–2
Women's Singles Semifinals	(United States) Serena Williams [1]	(United States) Madison Keys	7–6^{(7–5)}, 6–2
Men's Singles Semifinals	(United Kingdom) Andy Murray [6]	(Czech Republic) Tomáš Berdych [7]	6–7^{(6–8)}, 6–0, 6–3, 7–5
Exhibition Doubles	(Sweden) Jonas Björkman (Australia) Pat Cash	(France) Henri Leconte (Australia) Mark Philippoussis	4–2, 4–2
Matches on Margaret Court Arena
Event	Winner	Loser	Score
Men's Doubles Semifinals	(France) Pierre-Hugues Herbert (France) Nicolas Mahut	(Croatia) Ivan Dodig [4] (Brazil) Marcelo Melo [4]	6–4, 6–7^{(5–7)}, 7–6^{(7–5)}
Men's Legends Doubles	(Sweden) Jonas Björkman (Sweden) Thomas Johansson	(United States) Michael Chang (South Africa) Wayne Ferreira	3–4^{(3–5)}, 4–2, 3–4^{(4–6)}, 4–2, 4–3^{(5–2)}
Mixed Doubles Quarterfinals	(France) Kristina Mladenovic [3] (Canada) Daniel Nestor [3]	(Zimbabwe) Cara Black [5] (Colombia) Juan Sebastián Cabal [5]	6–2, 6–3
Mixed Doubles Quarterfinals	(Chinese Taipei) Hsieh Su-wei (Uruguay) Pablo Cuevas	(Slovenia) Katarina Srebotnik [2] (Brazil) Marcelo Melo [2]	6–1, 6–2
Colored background indicates a night match
Matches start at 11:00 am; night matches do not start before 7:30 pm

== Day 12 (30 January) ==
- Day 12 attendance:
- Seeds out:
  - Men's Singles: (Switzerland) Stan Wawrinka [4]
  - Women's Doubles: (Chinese Taipei) Chan Yung-jan / (China) Zheng Jie [14]
  - Mixed Doubles: (India) Sania Mirza / (Brazil) Bruno Soares [1]
- Schedule of Play

Matches on main courts
Matches on Rod Laver Arena
Event	Winner	Loser	Score
Mixed Doubles Semifinals	(Switzerland) Martina Hingis [7] (India) Leander Paes [7]	(Chinese Taipei) Hsieh Su-wei (Uruguay) Pablo Cuevas	7–5, 6–4
Women's Doubles Final	(United States) Bethanie Mattek-Sands [PR] (Czech Republic) Lucie Šafářová [PR]	(Chinese Taipei) Chan Yung-jan [14] (China) Zheng Jie [14]	6–4, 7–6^{(7–5)}
Men's Singles Semifinals	(Serbia) Novak Djokovic [1]	(Switzerland) Stan Wawrinka [4]	7–6^{(7–1)}, 3–6, 6–4, 4–6, 6–0
Matches on Margaret Court Arena
Event	Winner	Loser	Score
Men Legends' Doubles	(Sweden) Jonas Björkman (Sweden) Thomas Johansson	(Sweden) Thomas Enqvist (Sweden) Mats Wilander	3–4^{(4–6)}, 4–2, 4–2, 4–2
Mixed Doubles Semifinals	(France) Kristina Mladenovic [3] (Canada) Daniel Nestor [3]	(India) Sania Mirza [1] (Brazil) Bruno Soares [1]	3–6, 6–2, [10–8]
Colored background indicates a night match
Matches start at 3:00 pm; night matches do not start before 7:30 pm

== Day 13 (31 January) ==
- Day 13 attendance:
- Seeds out:
  - Women's Singles: (Russia) Maria Sharapova [2]
- Schedule of Play

Matches on main courts
Matches on Rod Laver Arena
Event	Winner	Loser	Score
Girls' Singles Final	(Slovakia) Tereza Mihalíková	(United Kingdom) Katie Swan [14]	6–1, 6–4
Boys' Singles Final	(Russia) Roman Safiullin [1]	(South Korea) Hong Seong-chan [7]	7–5, 7–6^{(7–2)}
Women's Singles Final	(United States) Serena Williams [1]	(Russia) Maria Sharapova [2]	6–3, 7–6^{(7–5)}
Men's Doubles Final	(Italy) Simone Bolelli (Italy) Fabio Fognini	(France) Pierre-Hugues Herbert (France) Nicolas Mahut	6–4, 6–4
Colored background indicates a night match
Matches start at 1:00 pm; night matches do not start before 7:30 pm

== Day 14 (1 February) ==
- Day 14 attendance:
- Seeds out:
  - Men's Singles: (United Kingdom) Andy Murray [6]
  - Mixed Doubles: (France) Kristina Mladenovic / (Canada) Daniel Nestor [3]
- Schedule of Play

Matches on main courts
Matches on Rod Laver Arena
Event	Winner	Loser	Score
Mixed Doubles Final	(Switzerland) Martina Hingis [7] (India) Leander Paes [7]	(France) Kristina Mladenovic [3] (Canada) Daniel Nestor [3]	6–4, 6–3
Men's Singles Final	(Serbia) Novak Djokovic [1]	(United Kingdom) Andy Murray [6]	7–6^{(7–5)}, 6–7^{(4–7)}, 6–3, 6–0
Colored background indicates a night match
Matches start at 4:00 pm; night matches do not start before 7:30 pm
