= 2016 Australian Open – Main draw wildcard entries =

- Date: October 2015 – January 2016
- Edition: 104th
- Category: Grand Slam (ITF)
- Location: United States (6 places across the country); Shenzhen, Guangdong Province, China; Melbourne, Victoria, Australia
← 2015 ·	Australian Open – Main draw wildcard entries	· 2017 →

The 2016 Australian Open wildcard playoffs and entries was a group of events and internal selections to choose the eight men and eight women singles wildcard entries for the 2016 Australian Open, as well as seven male and seven female doubles teams plus eight mixed doubles teams.

One wildcard each was given to the winners of the Australian Open Wildcard Playoff, a tournament between Australian players who did not receive direct entry into the draw. This took place from 14 to 20 December 2015.

In an agreement with the United States Tennis Association and the French Tennis Federation, Tennis Australia gives one man and one woman from the United States and France each a wildcard into the Australian Open. The French players were chosen by internal selection, while USTA awarded the entry to the player with the most points over three pre-selected events in USA over October and November 2015.

Since the Australian Open is promoted as the "Grand Slam of Asia/Pacific", one male and one female player from this geographical area were awarded a wildcard. This was decided through the Asia-Pacific Australian Open Wildcard Playoff. At the same event, one male and one female doubles team won wildcards, and one wildcard each was contested in boys and girls singles. This took place from 2 to 6 December 2015.

Remaining wildcards were awarded by internal Australian selection.

For the first time, a new initiative was put in place for rewarding women's wildcards. A wildcard race was put in place by Tennis Australia to offer the highest Australian points earner from the 2015 Canberra Tennis International and 2015 Bendigo Women's International a main draw wildcard. The singles wildcard was won by Tammi Patterson and the doubles wildcard was won by Jessica Moore and Storm Sanders. Also for the first time, the winner of the girls' 18 and under national championships was rewarded a main draw wildcard.

== Wildcard entries ==
=== Men's singles ===
Country	Name	Method of Qualification
JPN	Yoshihito Nishioka	Asia-Pacific Wildcard Playoff
FRA	Quentin Halys	French internal selection
USA	Noah Rubin	American Wildcard Challenge
AUS	James Duckworth	Australian Wildcard Playoff
AUS	Lleyton Hewitt	Australian internal selection
AUS	Omar Jasika	Australian internal selection
AUS	Matthew Ebden	Australian internal selection
AUS	Jordan Thompson	Australian internal selection

=== Women's singles ===
Country	Name	Method of Qualification
CHN	Han Xinyun	Asia-Pacific Wildcard Playoff
FRA	Océane Dodin	French internal selection
USA	Samantha Crawford	American Wildcard Challenge
AUS	Tammi Patterson	Australian Wildcard Challenge
AUS	Maddison Inglis	Australian Wildcard Playoff
AUS	Priscilla Hon	Australian 18/u Champion
AUS	Kimberly Birrell	Australian internal selection
AUS	Storm Sanders	Australian internal selection

=== Men's doubles ===
Country	Name	Method of Qualification
TPE; TPE	Hsieh Cheng-peng; Yang Tsung-hua	Asia-Pacific Wildcard Playoff
AUS; AUS	Alex Bolt; Andrew Whittington	Australian internal selection
AUS; AUS	James Duckworth; John Millman	Australian internal selection
AUS; AUS	Sam Groth; Lleyton Hewitt	Australian internal selection
AUS; AUS	Omar Jasika; Nick Kyrgios	Australian internal selection
USA; USA	Austin Krajicek; Donald Young	Australian internal selection
AUS; AUS	Luke Saville; John-Patrick Smith	Australian internal selection

=== Women's doubles ===
Country	Name	Method of Qualification
JPN; JPN	Shuko Aoyama; Makoto Ninomiya	Asia-Pacific Wildcard Playoff
AUS; AUS	Jessica Moore; Storm Sanders	Australian Wildcard Challenge
AUS; AUS	Alison Bai; Naiktha Bains	Australian internal selection
AUS; AUS	Kimberly Birrell; Priscilla Hon	Australian internal selection
SVK; AUS	Daniela Hantuchová; Jarmila Wolfe	Australian internal selection
AUS; AUS	Tammi Patterson; Olivia Rogowska	Australian internal selection
AUS; AUS	Ellen Perez; Belinda Woolcock	Australian internal selection

=== Mixed doubles ===
Country	Name	Method of Qualification
AUS; AUS	Kimberly Birrell; John Millman	Australian internal selection
AUS; AUS	Daria Gavrilova; Luke Saville	Australian internal selection
AUS; AUS	Maddison Inglis; Benjamin Mitchell	Australian internal selection
AUS; AUS	Jessica Moore; Marc Polmans	Australian internal selection
AUS; AUS	Anastasia Rodionova; Chris Guccione	Australian internal selection
AUS; AUS	Arina Rodionova; Matt Reid	Australian internal selection
AUS; AUS	Ajla Tomljanović; Nick Kyrgios	Australian internal selection
CHN; KOR	Zheng Saisai; Chung Hyeon	Australian internal selection

== Asia-Pacific Wildcard Playoff ==
The Asia-Pacific Wildcard Playoff events took place in Shenzhen, Guangdong, China from Monday, November 30 to Sunday, December 6, 2015. A total of 26 male and 30 female players from Asia/Pacific zone took part in singles events (including qualifying competitions), with Yoshihito Nishioka from Japan and Han Xinyun from China gaining the Australian Open entry. Both doubles events consisted of 18 male and 19 female teams, with Hsieh Cheng-peng & Yang Tsung-hua and Shuko Aoyama & Makoto Ninomiya winning the wild cards. Junior playoff events were also held, and Chinese players Mu Tao and Wang Xiyu won the wild card entries into the Boys' and Girls' main events, respectively.

=== Men's singles ===
First round
1	(Japan) Yoshihito Nishioka	6	6
Q	(China) Wu Hao	1	4
WC	(China) Sun Fajing	6	7
5	(China) Wu Di	3	5
4	(China) Bai Yan	6	7^{7}
WC	(China) Gong Xiao	3	6^{4}
Q	(China) Qi Xi	3	1
6	(China) Li Zhe	6	6
8	(Indonesia) Christopher Rungkat	6	6
Q	(China) Zhu Zhicheng	2	4
WC	(Japan) Toshihide Matsui
3	(Chinese Taipei) Yang Tsung-hua	w/o
7	(Chinese Taipei) Jason Jung	6	6
WC	(Philippines) Ruben Gonzales	4	2
Q	(China) Zhou Shenghao	2	1
2	(China) Zhang Ze	6	6

Quarterfinals
1	(Japan) Y Nishioka	6	6
WC	(China) F Sun	2	4
4	(China) Y Bai
6	(China) Z Li	w/o
8	(Indonesia) C Rungkat	4	6^{4}
3	(Chinese Taipei) T-h Yang	6	7^{7}
7	(Chinese Taipei) J Jung	2	7	6
2	(China) Z Zhang	6	5	3

Semifinals
1	(Japan) Y Nishioka	6	6
6	(China) Z Li	4	2
3	(Chinese Taipei) T-h Yang	2	2
7	(Chinese Taipei) J Jung	6	6

Final
1	(Japan) Y Nishioka	3	6	6
7	(Chinese Taipei) J Jung	6	2	3

=== Women's singles ===
First round
1	(China) Wang Yafan	6	6
Q	(Japan) Akari Inoue	2	0
WC	(Japan) Shiho Akita	5	5
7	(Japan) Shuko Aoyama	7	7
3	(Chinese Taipei) Lee Ya-hsuan	6	6
WC	(China) Sun Xuliu	4	4
Q	(China) Gai Ao	1	6	1
5	(China) Lu Jingjing	6	4	6
6	(South Korea) Han Na-lae	5	0
Q	(China) Tian Ran	7	6
LL	(China) Ye Qiuyu	1	3
4/WC	(Thailand) Varatchaya Wongteanchai	6	6
8	(China) You Xiaodi	7	3	0^{r}
Q	(China) Xun Fangying	5	6	3
(China) Gao Xinyu	5	0
2	(China) Han Xinyun	7	6

Quarterfinals
1	(China) Y Wang	6	6
7	(Japan) S Aoyama	4	4
3	(Chinese Taipei) Y-h Lee	6^{4}	1
5	(China) J Lu	7^{7}	6
Q	(China) R Tian	1	4
4/WC	(Thailand) V Wongteanchai	6	6
Q	(China) F Xun	2	2
2	(China) X Han	6	6

Semifinals
1	(China) Y Wang	6	4	6
5	(China) J Lu	2	6	1
4/WC	(Thailand) V Wongteanchai	2	2
2	(China) X Han	6	6

Final
1	(China) Y Wang	1	0
2	(China) X Han	6	6

=== Men's doubles ===
Quarterfinals
1	(China) Gong Maoxin (Chinese Taipei) Peng Hsien-yin	6^{5}	6	[7]
(Japan) Toshihide Matsui (Indonesia) Christopher Rungkat	7^{7}	2	[10]
3	(Chinese Taipei) Hsieh Cheng-peng (Chinese Taipei) Yang Tsung-hua	6	6^{5}	[10]
(Philippines) Ruben Gonzales (Chinese Taipei) Jason Jung	4	7^{7}	[8]
(China) Wu Di (Chinese Taipei) Yi Chu-huan	5	4
4	(Chinese Taipei) Lee Hsin-han (China) Zhang Ze	7	6
WC	(China) Gong Pengxiang (China) Qi Xi	0	4
2	(China) Bai Yan (China) Li Zhe	6	6

Semifinals
(Japan) T Matsui (Indonesia) C Rungkat	6	5	[4]
3	(Chinese Taipei) C-p Hsieh (Chinese Taipei) T-h Yang	2	7	[10]
4	(Chinese Taipei) H-h Lee (China) Z Zhang	4	6^{3}
2	(China) Y Bai (China) Z Li	6	7^{7}

Final
3	(Chinese Taipei) C-p Hsieh (Chinese Taipei) T-h Yang	6	7^{8}
2	(China) Y Bai (China) Z Li	4	6^{6}

=== Women's doubles ===
Quarterfinals
1	(Japan) Shuko Aoyama (Japan) Makoto Ninomiya	6	6
(Japan) Shiho Akita (Japan) Akari Inoue	1	3
3	(South Korea) Han Na-lae (Chinese Taipei) Lee Ya-hsuan	6	6
(China) Gao Xinyu (China) Xun Fangying	2	0
WC	(Chinese Taipei) Chen Pei-hsuan (Chinese Taipei) Huang Hsiang-wen	0	3
4	(China) Han Xinyun (China) Lu Jingjing	6	6
(China) Chen Jiahui (China) Ye Qiuyu	4	4
2	(Thailand) Varatchaya Wongteanchai (China) Yang Zhaoxuan	6	6

Semifinals
1	(Japan) S Aoyama (Japan) M Ninomiya	6^{5}	6	[10]
3	(South Korea) N-l Han (Chinese Taipei) Y-h Lee	7^{7}	2	[4]
4	(China) X Han (China) J Lu	3	6	[5]
2	(Thailand) V Wongteanchai (China) Z Yang	6	4	[10]

Final
1	(Japan) S Aoyama (Japan) M Ninomiya	6	7^{8}
2	(Thailand) V Wongteanchai (China) Z Yang	0	6^{6}

== Australian Wildcard Playoff ==
The December Showdown was held between 5 and 20 December. This Showdown included the Wildcard Playoff as well as 18/u, 16/u, 14/u and 12/u National Championships. The men's wildcard playoff was won by top seed James Duckworth who defeated Benjamin Mitchell in the final by a walkover. Mitchell was forced to pull out of the final to be in Brisbane with his partner whom was due to give birth. The women's wildcard playoff was won by unseeded teen Maddison Inglis, who defeated newlywed Arina Rodionova in the final.

=== Men's singles ===
First round
1	(Australia) James Duckworth	6	6^{5}	6	6
(Australia) Harry Bourchier	3	7^{7}	2	3
(Australia) Marc Polmans	3	2	6	4
5	(Australia) Alex Bolt	6	6	4	1^{r}
3	(Australia) Luke Saville	2	6	6	6
(Australia) Jacob Grills	6	3	2	3
(Australia) Maverick Banes	6	1	6^{3}	6	3
7	(Australia) Marinko Matosevic	3	6	7^{7}	4	6
8	(Australia) Matthew Barton	6	6	6
(Australia) Omar Jasika	4	3	3
(Australia) Oliver Anderson	1	2	4
4	(Australia) Benjamin Mitchell	6	6	6
6	(Australia) Gavin van Peperzeel	3	6^{3}	6	4
(Australia) Bradley Mousley	6	7^{7}	4	6
(Australia) Matt Reid	3	2	1
2	(Australia) Jordan Thompson	6	6	6

Quarterfinals
1	(Australia) J Duckworth	6	6	6
(Australia) M Polmans	4	4	3
3	(Australia) L Saville	3	2	2
7	(Australia) M Matosevic	6	6	6
8	(Australia) M Barton	6^{5}	7^{7}	2	0
4	(Australia) B Mitchell	7^{7}	6^{5}	6	6
(Australia) B Mousley	4	7	4	7^{7}	6
2	(Australia) J Thompson	6	5	6	6^{5}	4

Semifinals
1	(Australia) J Duckworth	4	6	7^{9}	7^{10}
7	(Australia) M Matosevic	6	3	6^{7}	6^{8}
4	(Australia) B Mitchell	2	7^{7}	7^{7}	6
(Australia) B Mousley	6	6^{3}	6^{2}	4

Final
1	(Australia) J Duckworth	w/o
4	(Australia) B Mitchell

=== Women's singles ===
First round
1	(Australia) Olivia Rogowska	3	2
(Australia) Kaylah McPhee	6	6
(Australia) Maddison Inglis	6	3	6
8	(Australia) Zoe Hives	4	6	0
4	(Australia) Alison Bai	6	3	0
(Australia) Belinda Woolcock	2	6	6
(Australia) Naiktha Bains	6	5	6
9	(Australia) Sally Peers	3	7	1
6	(Australia) Storm Sanders	6	6
Alt	(Australia) Lizette Cabrera	3	2
(Australia) Abbie Myers	6	6
3	(Australia) Jessica Moore	3	4
7	(Australia) Olivia Tjandramulia	4	7^{7}	4
(Australia) Destanee Aiava	6	6^{5}	6
(Australia) Angelique Svinos	1	3
2	(Australia) Arina Rodionova	6	6

Quarterfinals
(Australia) K McPhee	3	5
(Australia) M Inglis	6	7
(Australia) B Woolcock	4	6^{5}
(Australia) N Bains	6	7^{7}
6	(Australia) S Sanders	4	6	8
(Australia) A Myers	6	2	6
(Australia) D Aiava	2	4
2	(Australia) Ar Rodionova	6	6

Semifinals
(Australia) M Inglis	6	2	6
(Australia) N Bains	2	6	2
6	(Australia) S Sanders	6	4	5
2	(Australia) Ar Rodionova	1	6	7

Final
(Australia) M Inglis	6	6
2	(Australia) Ar Rodionova	4	2

NB: Kimberly Birrell was the number 5 seed, but withdrew prior to the commencement of play.

=== Girls' singles ===
For the first time in Australian Open history, the winner of the girls' 18/U Championships will receive a main draw wildcard into the 2016 Australian Open. The wildcard was won by top seed Priscilla Hon who defeated wildcard playoff winner Maddison Inglis in the final.

Quarterfinals
1	(Australia) Priscilla Hon	6	6
WC	(Australia) Petra Hule	2	2
5	(Australia) Naiktha Bains	6^{5}	3
4	(Australia) Olivia Tjandramulia	7^{7}	6
3	(Australia) Sara Tomic	2	1
6	(Australia) Destanee Aiava	6	6
WC	(Australia) Kaylah McPhee	7	6^{4}	1
7	(Australia) Maddison Inglis	5	7^{7}	6

Semifinals
1	(Australia) Priscilla Hon	3	7^{7}	7^{12}
4	(Australia) Olivia Tjandramulia	6	6^{2}	6^{10}
6	(Australia) Destanee Aiava	5	2
7	(Australia) Maddison Inglis	7	6

Final
1	(Australia) Priscilla Hon	6	7^{7}
7	(Australia) Maddison Inglis	2	6^{5}

NB: Kimberly Birrell was the number 2 seed.

=== Mixed doubles ===
The 'Win a Wildcard' competition held by Tennis Australia allowed any person over the age of 16 entry into the competition. State championships were held across the period of November and December and the finals were held at Melbourne Park on 20 December. The entire competition was played using the Fast4 Tennis method. The competition was won by Bradley Mousley and Jessica Moore who had secured a wildcard into the 2016 Australian Open mixed doubles event. However, Mousley withdrew from the event, and Moore partnered Marc Polmans.

Semifinals				Final
2	(Australia) Aaron Addison (Australia) Alana Parnaby	1	3
4	(Australia) James Frawley (Australia) Alison Bai	4	4	4	(Australia) James Frawley (Australia) Alison Bai	1	0
3	(Australia) Scott Puodziunas (Australia) Ashling Sumner	3	3	1	(Australia) Bradley Mousley (Australia) Jessica Moore	4	4
1	(Australia) Bradley Mousley (Australia) Jessica Moore	4	4
