= 2015 Australian Open =

- Date: 19 January – 1 February 2015
- Edition: 103rd
- Category: Grand Slam (ITF)
- Draw: 128S/64D/32X
- Prize money: A$40,000,000
- Surface: Hard (Plexicushion)
- Location: Melbourne, Victoria, Australia
- Venue: Melbourne Park
- Attendance: 703,899

Champions

Men's singles
- (Serbia) Novak Djokovic

Women's singles
- (United States) Serena Williams

Men's doubles
- (Italy) Simone Bolelli / (Italy) Fabio Fognini

Women's doubles
- (United States) Bethanie Mattek-Sands / (Czech Republic) Lucie Šafářová

Mixed doubles
- (Switzerland) Martina Hingis / (India) Leander Paes

Wheelchair men's singles
- (Japan) Shingo Kunieda

Wheelchair women's singles
- (Netherlands) Jiske Griffioen

Wheelchair quad singles
- (Australia) Dylan Alcott

Wheelchair men's doubles
- (France) Stéphane Houdet / (Japan) Shingo Kunieda

Wheelchair women's doubles
- (Japan) Yui Kamiji / (United Kingdom) Jordanne Whiley

Wheelchair quad doubles
- (United Kingdom) Andrew Lapthorne / (United States) David Wagner

Boys' singles
- (Russia) Roman Safiullin

Girls' singles
- (Slovakia) Tereza Mihalíková

Boys' doubles
- (Australia) Jake Delaney / (Australia) Marc Polmans

Girls' doubles
- (Czech Republic) Miriam Kolodziejová / (Czech Republic) Markéta Vondroušová
- Australian Open

The 2015 Australian Open was a tennis tournament that took place at Melbourne Park from 19 January to 1 February 2015. It was the 103rd edition of the Australian Open, and the first Grand Slam tournament of the year.

Stan Wawrinka was the defending champion in men's singles but lost to four-time Australian Open champion Novak Djokovic in the semi-finals. Reigning women's champion Li Na did not defend her title, as she retired from professional tennis in September, 2014. Novak Djokovic won an Open Era record fifth men's singles crown by defeating Andy Murray in the final, and this was the third time they met each other in the final. Serena Williams won an Open Era record six women's singles championships by defeating Maria Sharapova in the final, and this was the second time they met each other in the final.

Simone Bolelli and Fabio Fognini teamed up to win the men's doubles title for the first time over the team of Pierre-Hugues Herbert and Nicolas Mahut. Bethanie Mattek-Sands and Lucie Šafářová teamed up to win the women's doubles crown for the first time over the team of Chan Yung-jan and Zheng Jie. Martina Hingis and Leander Paes teamed up to win the mixed doubles title, it was the second for Hingis and third for Paes, over the defending champions Kristina Mladenovic and Daniel Nestor.

== Tournament ==
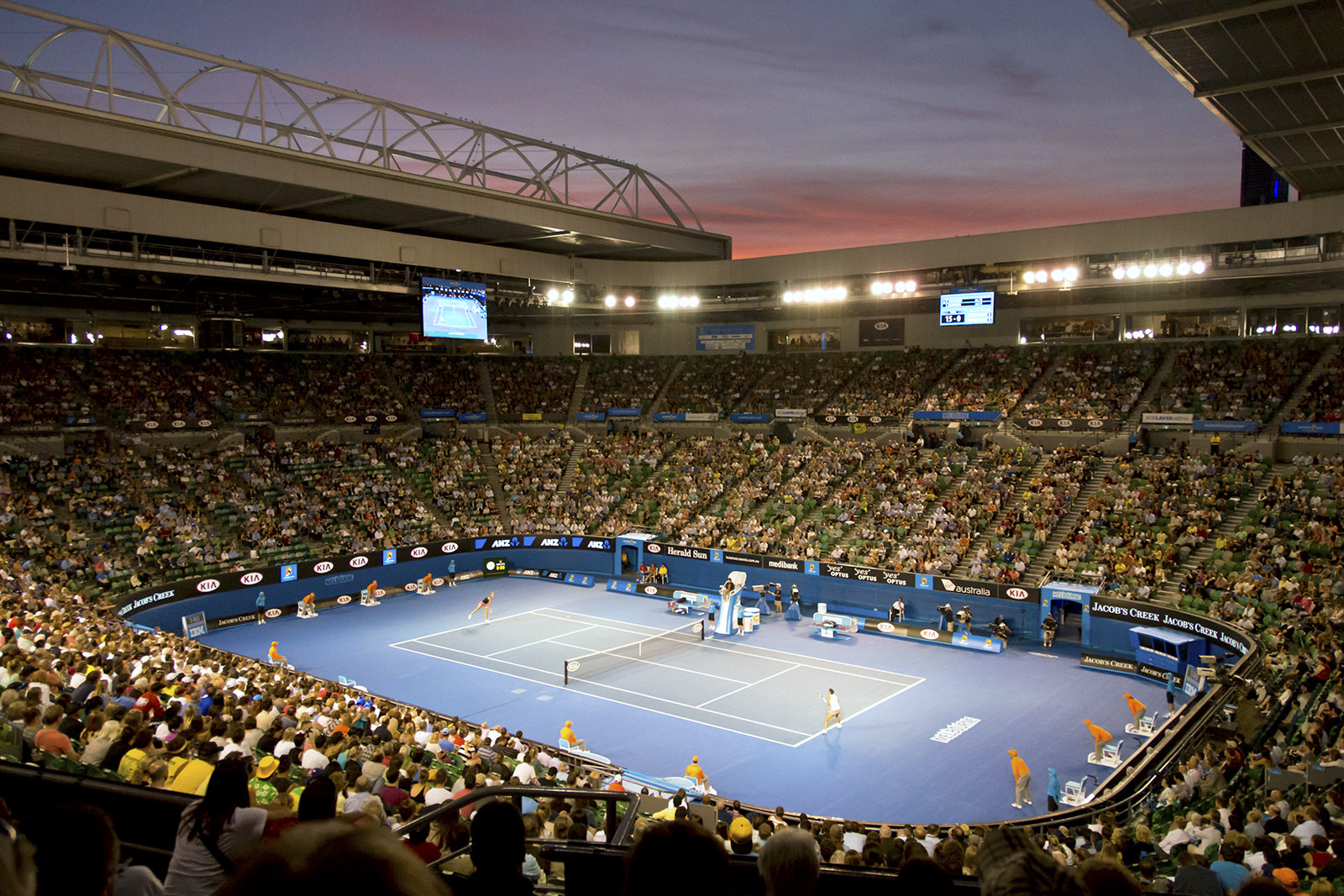
Rod Laver Arena where the Finals of the Australian Open take place

The 2015 Australian Open was the 103rd edition of the tournament and was held at Melbourne Park in Melbourne, Victoria, Australia.

The tournament was run by the International Tennis Federation (ITF) and was part of the 2015 ATP World Tour and the 2015 WTA Tour calendars under the Grand Slam category. The tournament consisted of both men's and women's singles and doubles draws as well as a mixed doubles event. There were singles and doubles events for both boys and girls (players under 18), which was part of the Grade A category of tournaments, and also singles, doubles and quad events for men's and women's wheelchair tennis players as part of the NEC tour under the Grand Slam category.

The tournament was played on hard courts and took place over a series of 16 courts with Plexicushion surface, including the three main showcourts – Rod Laver Arena, Hisense Arena and Margaret Court Arena. The latter was unveiled with a capacity increase from 6,000 to 7,500 and also as the third Melbourne Park venue with fully operational retractable roof to make the Australian Open the first Grand Slam tournament with three such tennis stadiums. Partly due to the new roof, the 2015 event set an all-time attendance record of 703,899 fans. The cooler than normal temperatures may also have played a role.

== Broadcast ==
The tournament was broadcast in more than 200 countries around the world. In Australia, all matches were broadcast live by the Seven Network on the network's primary channel under the banner Seven Sport. In the Asia/Pacific region, the tournament was covered by CCTV, iQiyi, SMG (China), Fiji One (Fiji), Sony SIX (India), Wowow, NHK (Japan), Sky TV (New Zealand) and Fox Sports Asia, in Europe by Eurosport, NOS (Netherlands), SRG SSR (Switzerland) and BBC (United Kingdom), in the Middle East by beIN Sports, in Africa by SuperSport, while in the Americas coverage was provided by ESPN.

In 2015, live coverage emanated from all sixteen courts. Qualifying tournaments, draw ceremony and Kids' Day were shown on official tournament website, AusOpen.com.

== Point and prize money distribution ==
=== Point distribution ===
Below is a series of tables for each of the competitions showing the ranking points on offer for each event.

==== Senior points ====
| Event | W | F | SF | QF | Round of 16 | Round of 32 | Round of 64 | Round of 128 | Q | Q3 | Q2 | Q1 |
| Men's singles | 2000 | 1200 | 720 | 360 | 180 | 90 | 45 | 10 | 25 | 16 | 8 | 0 |
| Men's doubles | 2000 | 1200 | 720 | 360 | 180 | 90 | 0 | —N/a | —N/a | —N/a | —N/a | —N/a |
| Women's singles | 2000 | 1300 | 780 | 430 | 240 | 130 | 70 | 10 | 40 | 30 | 20 | 2 |
| Women's doubles | 2000 | 1300 | 780 | 430 | 240 | 130 | 10 | —N/a | —N/a | —N/a | —N/a | —N/a |

==== Wheelchair points ====
| Event | W | F | SF/3rd | QF/4th |
| Singles | 800 | 500 | 375 | 100 |
| Doubles | 800 | 500 | 100 | —N/a |
| Quad singles | 800 | 500 | 100 | —N/a |
| Quad doubles | 800 | 100 | —N/a | —N/a |

==== Junior points ====
| Event | W | F | SF | QF | Round of 16 | Round of 32 | Q | Q3 |
| Boys' singles | 375 | 270 | 180 | 120 | 75 | 30 | 25 | 20 |
| Girls' singles | 375 | 270 | 180 | 120 | 75 | 30 | 25 | 20 |
| Boys' doubles | 270 | 180 | 120 | 75 | 45 | —N/a | —N/a | —N/a |
| Girls' doubles | 270 | 180 | 120 | 75 | 45 | —N/a | —N/a | —N/a |

=== Prize money ===
The Australian Open total prize money for 2015 was increased to A$40,000,000, with men's and women's singles champions to receive a tournament-record 3.1 million Australian dollars reward. Out of total prize money, A$28,796,000 was paid for players competing in singles main draw, further A$1,344,000 for players, who lost in qualifying, A$5,165,200 – for doubles players, A$480,000 for mixed doubles players and A$605,330 for competitors in other events, while A$3,609,470 was used to cover other fees, including players' per diem and trophies.

| Event | W | F | SF | QF | Round of 16 | Round of 32 | Round of 64 | Round of 128^{1} | Q3 | Q2 | Q1 |
| Singles | A$3,100,000 | A$1,550,000 | A$650,000 | A$340,000 | A$175,000 | A$97,500 | A$60,000 | A$34,500 | A$16,000 | A$8,000 | A$4,000 |
| Doubles* | A$575,000 | A$285,000 | A$142,500 | A$71,000 | A$39,000 | A$23,000 | A$14,800 | —N/a | —N/a | —N/a | —N/a |
| Mixed doubles* | A$142,500 | A$71,500 | A$35,600 | A$16,300 | A$8,200 | A$4,000 | —N/a | —N/a | —N/a | —N/a | —N/a |

_{^{1}Qualifiers prize money is also the Round of 128 prize money.}
_{*per team}

== Singles players ==
2015 Australian Open – Men's singles

| Champion | | Runner-up | |
|---|---|---|---|
| (Serbia) Novak Djokovic [1] | | (United Kingdom) Andy Murray [6] | |
Semifinals out
| (Switzerland) Stan Wawrinka [4] | | (Czech Republic) Tomáš Berdych [7] | |
Quarterfinals out
| (Canada) Milos Raonic [8] | (Japan) Kei Nishikori [5] | (Spain) Rafael Nadal [3] | (Australia) Nick Kyrgios |
4th round out
| (Luxembourg) Gilles Müller | (Spain) Feliciano López [12] | (Spain) Guillermo García López | (Spain) David Ferrer [9] |
| (Australia) Bernard Tomic | (South Africa) Kevin Anderson [14] | (Bulgaria) Grigor Dimitrov [10] | (Italy) Andreas Seppi |
3rd round out
| (Spain) Fernando Verdasco [31] | (United States) John Isner [19] | (Poland) Jerzy Janowicz | (Germany) Benjamin Becker |
| (Finland) Jarkko Nieminen | (Canada) Vasek Pospisil | (France) Gilles Simon [18] | (United States) Steve Johnson |
| (Serbia) Viktor Troicki | (Australia) Sam Groth | (France) Richard Gasquet [24] | (Israel) Dudi Sela |
| (Portugal) João Sousa | (Cyprus) Marcos Baghdatis | (Tunisia) Malek Jaziri | (Switzerland) Roger Federer [2] |
2nd round out
| (Russia) Andrey Kuznetsov | (Japan) Go Soeda | (Austria) Andreas Haider-Maurer | (Spain) Roberto Bautista Agut [13] |
| (France) Adrian Mannarino | (France) Gaël Monfils [17] | (Australia) Lleyton Hewitt | (United States) Donald Young |
| (Romania) Marius Copil (Q) | (Germany) Matthias Bachinger (Q) | (Italy) Paolo Lorenzi | (Colombia) Alejandro González |
| (Ukraine) Sergiy Stakhovsky | (Spain) Marcel Granollers | (Colombia) Santiago Giraldo [30] | (Croatia) Ivan Dodig |
| (Austria) Jürgen Melzer (Q) | (Argentina) Leonardo Mayer [26] | (Germany) Philipp Kohlschreiber [22] | (Australia) Thanasi Kokkinakis (WC) |
| (Lithuania) Ričardas Berankis | (Australia) James Duckworth (WC) | (Czech Republic) Lukáš Rosol [28] | (United States) Tim Smyczek (Q) |
| (Australia) Marinko Matosevic | (Slovakia) Martin Kližan [32] | (Belgium) David Goffin [20] | (Slovakia) Lukáš Lacko |
| (France) Édouard Roger-Vasselin | (Croatia) Ivo Karlović [23] | (France) Jérémy Chardy [29] | (Italy) Simone Bolelli |
1st round out
| (Slovenia) Aljaž Bedene (Q) | (Spain) Albert Ramos Viñolas | (Sweden) Elias Ymer (Q) | (United Kingdom) James Ward |
| (Chinese Taipei) Jimmy Wang (Q) | (France) Laurent Lokoli (Q) | (Spain) Pablo Carreño | (Austria) Dominic Thiem |
| (United States) Denis Kudla (WC) | (Slovenia) Blaž Rola | (Japan) Hiroki Moriya (LL) | (France) Lucas Pouille (WC) |
| (France) Julien Benneteau [25] | (China) Zhang Ze (WC) | (Germany) Tim Pütz (Q) | (Ukraine) Illya Marchenko (Q) |
| (Turkey) Marsel İlhan | (Spain) Pablo Andújar | (Kazakhstan) Andrey Golubev | (Uruguay) Pablo Cuevas [27] |
| (Ukraine) Alexandr Dolgopolov [21] | (United States) Sam Querrey | (Germany) Peter Gojowczyk | (Italy) Fabio Fognini [16] |
| (Brazil) Thomaz Bellucci | (Serbia) Dušan Lajović | (France) Stéphane Robert (PR) | (Netherlands) Robin Haase |
| (Czech Republic) Jan Hernych (Q) | (United Kingdom) Kyle Edmund (Q) | (Brazil) João Souza | (Spain) Nicolás Almagro |
| (Colombia) Alejandro Falla | (Dominican Republic) Víctor Estrella Burgos | (Czech Republic) Jiří Veselý | (Australia) John Millman (WC) |
| (France) Paul-Henri Mathieu | (Germany) Tobias Kamke | (Serbia) Filip Krajinović | (Latvia) Ernests Gulbis [11] |
| (Argentina) Diego Schwartzman | (Netherlands) Igor Sijsling | (Slovenia) Blaz Kavčič | (Argentina) Carlos Berlocq |
| (France) Kenny de Schepper | (Germany) Jan-Lennard Struff | (Australia) Luke Saville (WC) | (Russia) Mikhail Youzhny |
| (India) Yuki Bhambri (Q) | (Russia) Alexander Kudryavtsev (Q) | (Australia) Jordan Thompson (WC) | (Japan) Tatsuma Ito |
| (United States) Michael Russell (Q) | (Russia) Teymuraz Gabashvili | (Argentina) Máximo González | (Germany) Dustin Brown |
| (Spain) Tommy Robredo [15] | (Kazakhstan) Mikhail Kukushkin | (Argentina) Federico Delbonis | (Belgium) Ruben Bemelmans (Q) |
| (Croatia) Borna Ćorić | (Uzbekistan) Denis Istomin | (Argentina) Juan Mónaco | (Chinese Taipei) Lu Yen-hsun |

2015 Australian Open – Women's singles

| Champion | | Runner-up | |
|---|---|---|---|
| (United States) Serena Williams [1] | | (Russia) Maria Sharapova [2] | |
Semifinals out
| (United States) Madison Keys | | (Russia) Ekaterina Makarova [10] | |
Quarterfinals out
| (Slovakia) Dominika Cibulková [11] | (United States) Venus Williams [18] | (Romania) Simona Halep [3] | (Canada) Eugenie Bouchard [7] |
4th round out
| (Spain) Garbiñe Muguruza [24] | (Belarus) Victoria Azarenka | (United States) Madison Brengle | (Poland) Agnieszka Radwańska [6] |
| (Germany) Julia Görges | (Belgium) Yanina Wickmayer | (Romania) Irina-Camelia Begu | (China) Peng Shuai [21] |
3rd round out
| (Ukraine) Elina Svitolina [26] | (Switzerland) Timea Bacsinszky | (France) Alizé Cornet [19] | (Czech Republic) Barbora Záhlavová-Strýcová [25] |
| (Czech Republic) Petra Kvitová [4] | (United States) CoCo Vandeweghe | (Italy) Camila Giorgi | (United States) Varvara Lepchenko [30] |
| (Czech Republic) Lucie Hradecká (Q) | (Czech Republic) Karolína Plíšková [22] | (Italy) Sara Errani [14] | (United States) Bethanie Mattek-Sands (PR) |
| (France) Caroline Garcia | (Germany) Carina Witthöft | (Kazakhstan) Yaroslava Shvedova | (Kazakhstan) Zarina Diyas [31] |
2nd round out
| (Russia) Vera Zvonareva (PR) | (United States) Nicole Gibbs | (Slovakia) Daniela Hantuchová | (United States) Anna Tatishvili (Q) |
| (Bulgaria) Tsvetana Pironkova | (Czech Republic) Denisa Allertová (Q) | (Chinese Taipei) Chang Kai-chen (WC) | (Denmark) Caroline Wozniacki [8] |
| (Germany) Mona Barthel | (Australia) Casey Dellacqua [29] | (Australia) Samantha Stosur [20] | (United States) Irina Falconi (WC) |
| (Czech Republic) Tereza Smitková | (United States) Lauren Davis | (Australia) Ajla Tomljanović | (Sweden) Johanna Larsson |
| (Slovenia) Polona Hercog | (Czech Republic) Klára Koukalová | (France) Océane Dodin (WC) | (Italy) Roberta Vinci |
| (Spain) Sílvia Soler Espinosa | (Spain) Lara Arruabarrena | (France) Kristina Mladenovic | (Australia) Jarmila Gajdošová |
| (Netherlands) Kiki Bertens | (Switzerland) Stefanie Vögele | (United States) Christina McHale | (Czech Republic) Kateřina Siniaková |
| (Puerto Rico) Monica Puig | (Slovakia) Magdaléna Rybáriková | (Slovakia) Anna Schmiedlová | (Russia) Alexandra Panova (Q) |
1st round out
| (Belgium) Alison Van Uytvanck | (Tunisia) Ons Jabeur (Q) | (Australia) Olivia Rogowska (WC) | (Kazakhstan) Yulia Putintseva (LL) |
| (New Zealand) Marina Erakovic | (China) Zheng Saisai | (Japan) Kimiko Date-Krumm | (Serbia) Jelena Janković [15] |
| (Belgium) Kirsten Flipkens | (United Kingdom) Heather Watson | (Switzerland) Romina Oprandi (PR) | (China) Zhang Shuai |
| (Hungary) Tímea Babos | (China) Zheng Jie | (United States) Sloane Stephens | (United States) Taylor Townsend |
| (Netherlands) Richèl Hogenkamp (Q) | (Croatia) Donna Vekić | (Ukraine) Lesia Tsurenko | (Austria) Yvonne Meusburger |
| (Romania) Monica Niculescu | (Italy) Francesca Schiavone | (Estonia) Kaia Kanepi | (Germany) Andrea Petkovic [13] |
| (Italy) Flavia Pennetta [12] | (Croatia) Mirjana Lučić-Baroni | (Serbia) Aleksandra Krunić | (Spain) María Teresa Torró Flor |
| (Russia) Vitalia Diatchenko | (United States) Shelby Rogers | (Russia) Alla Kudryavtseva | (Japan) Kurumi Nara |
| (Serbia) Ana Ivanovic [5] | (China) Wang Qiang | (Australia) Storm Sanders (WC) | (Switzerland) Belinda Bencic [32] |
| (Russia) Evgeniya Rodina (Q) | (United States) Alison Riske | (Serbia) Bojana Jovanovski | (Belgium) An-Sophie Mestach |
| (United States) Grace Min | (Germany) Annika Beck | (Czech Republic) Renata Voráčová (Q) | (Russia) Anastasia Pavlyuchenkova [23] |
| (Germany) Sabine Lisicki [28] | (China) Duan Yingying (WC) | (Romania) Alexandra Dulgheru | (Italy) Karin Knapp |
| (Germany) Anna-Lena Friedsam | (Australia) Daria Gavrilova (WC) | (France) Pauline Parmentier | (Russia) Svetlana Kuznetsova [27] |
| (Spain) Carla Suárez Navarro [17] | (France) Stéphanie Foretz (Q) | (Russia) Elena Vesnina | (Germany) Angelique Kerber [9] |
| (Czech Republic) Lucie Šafářová [16] | (Australia) Arina Rodionova (WC) | (Croatia) Ana Konjuh | (Germany) Tatjana Maria (Q) |
| (Poland) Urszula Radwańska (Q) | (South Africa) Chanelle Scheepers | (Romania) Sorana Cîrstea | (Croatia) Petra Martić (Q) |

== Events ==
=== Seniors ===
==== Men's singles ====
- (Serbia) Novak Djokovic defeated (United Kingdom) Andy Murray, 7–6^{(7–5)}, 6–7^{(4–7)}, 6–3, 6–0

This was the third time these two players met in the final. The other two times were in 2011 and 2013, when Djokovic won. This time would prove no different with Djokovic winning his fifth title, an Open Era record, to go along with his titles in 2008, 2011, 2012 and 2013. This victory was Djokovic's eighth grand slam title, tying him in the Open Era with Jimmy Connors, Ivan Lendl and Andre Agassi. This was Murray's fourth loss in the final of the Australian Open, three of them to Djokovic and one to Roger Federer in 2010. This marks the first time since Björn Borg at the US Open that someone has lost all four of his final appearances at a particular grand slam event.

==== Women's singles ====
- (United States) Serena Williams defeated (Russia) Maria Sharapova, 6–3, 7–6^{(7–5)}

This marked the second time these two players met in the final. The other time was in 2007, which Williams won. This time would be exactly the same, with Williams winning her sixth title (an Open Era record), to go along with wins in 2003, 2005, 2007, 2009 and 2010. This was her nineteenth career grand slam singles title, behind only Steffi Graf's twenty-two titles in the Open Era of tennis. This was Sharapova's third loss in the final; the other two losses were in 2012 to Victoria Azarenka and to Williams in 2007. Sharapova won the title in 2008.

==== Men's doubles ====
- (Italy) Simone Bolelli / (Italy) Fabio Fognini defeated (France) Pierre-Hugues Herbert / (France) Nicolas Mahut, 6–4, 6–4

This was the first men's doubles title for the team of Bolelli and Fognini at the event and in their respective careers.

==== Women's doubles ====
- (United States) Bethanie Mattek-Sands / (Czech Republic) Lucie Šafářová defeated (Chinese Taipei) Chan Yung-jan / (China) Zheng Jie, 6–4, 7–6^{(7–5)}

This was the first women's doubles title for the team of Mattek-Sands and Šafářová at the event and in their respective careers. One of their finalist opponents, Zheng Jie won the title in 2006 with Yan Zi.

==== Mixed doubles ====
- (Switzerland) Martina Hingis / (India) Leander Paes defeated (France) Kristina Mladenovic / (Canada) Daniel Nestor, 6–4, 6–3

This was a match of past mixed doubles champions at the event, which Hingis won with Mahesh Bhupathi in 2006, while her partner Paes won titles in 2003 with Martina Navratilova and in 2010 with Cara Black. Their finalist opponents' won the event last year, but Nestor won titles in 2007 with Elena Likhovtseva and 2011 with Katarina Srebotnik. This was Hingis' second mixed doubles title for her career, and for Paes' it is his seventh mixed doubles grand slam crown for his career.

=== Juniors ===
==== Boys' singles ====
- (Russia) Roman Safiullin defeated (South Korea) Hong Seong-chan, 7–5, 7–6^{(7–2)}

==== Girls' singles ====
- (Slovakia) Tereza Mihalíková defeated (United Kingdom) Katie Swan, 6–1, 6–4

==== Boys' doubles ====
- (Australia) Jake Delaney / (Australia) Marc Polmans defeated (Poland) Hubert Hurkacz / (Slovakia) Alex Molčan, 0–6, 6–2, [10–8]

==== Girls' doubles ====
- (Czech Republic) Miriam Kolodziejová / (Czech Republic) Markéta Vondroušová defeated (Germany) Katharina Hobgarski / (Belgium) Greet Minnen, 7–5, 6–4

=== Wheelchair ===
==== Wheelchair men's singles ====
- (Japan) Shingo Kunieda defeated (France) Stéphane Houdet, 6–2, 6–2

==== Wheelchair women's singles ====
- (Netherlands) Jiske Griffioen defeated (Japan) Yui Kamiji, 6–3, 7–5

==== Wheelchair quad singles ====
- (Australia) Dylan Alcott defeated (United States) David Wagner, 6–2, 6–3

==== Wheelchair men's doubles ====
- (France) Stéphane Houdet / (Japan) Shingo Kunieda defeated (Argentina) Gustavo Fernández / (United Kingdom) Gordon Reid, 6–2, 6–1

==== Wheelchair women's doubles ====
- (Japan) Yui Kamiji / (United Kingdom) Jordanne Whiley defeated (Netherlands) Jiske Griffioen / (Netherlands) Aniek van Koot, 4–6, 6–4, 7–5

==== Wheelchair quad doubles ====
- (United Kingdom) Andrew Lapthorne / (United States) David Wagner defeated (Australia) Dylan Alcott / (South Africa) Lucas Sithole, 6–0, 3–6, 6–2

== Singles seeds ==
Seedings are based on rankings as of 12 January 2015. Rankings and points before are as of 19 January 2015.
Points defending includes results from both the 2014 Australian Open and tournaments from the week of 27 January 2014 (Davis Cup for the men, and Paris and Pattaya for the women).

=== Men's singles ===
| Seed | Rank | Player | Points before | Points defending | Points won | Points after | Status |
|---|---|---|---|---|---|---|---|
| 1 | 1 | (Serbia) Novak Djokovic | 11,405 | 360 | 2,000 | 13,045 | Champion, defeated (United Kingdom) Andy Murray [6] |
| 2 | 2 | (Switzerland) Roger Federer | 9,875 | 720+40 | 90 | 9,205 | Third round lost to (Italy) Andreas Seppi |
| 3 | 3 | (Spain) Rafael Nadal | 6,585 | 1,200 | 360 | 5,745 | Quarterfinals lost to (Czech Republic) Tomáš Berdych [7] |
| 4 | 4 | (Switzerland) Stan Wawrinka | 5,370 | 2,000+40 | 720 | 4,050 | Semifinals lost to (Serbia) Novak Djokovic [1] |
| 5 | 5 | (Japan) Kei Nishikori | 5,025 | 180 | 360 | 5,205 | Quarterfinals lost to (Switzerland) Stan Wawrinka [4] |
| 6 | 6 | (United Kingdom) Andy Murray | 4,675 | 360+145 | 1,200+90 | 5,460 | Runner-up, lost to (Serbia) Novak Djokovic [1] |
| 7 | 7 | (Czech Republic) Tomáš Berdych | 4,660 | 720 | 720 | 4,660 | Semifinals lost to (United Kingdom) Andy Murray [6] |
| 8 | 8 | (Canada) Milos Raonic | 4,575 | 90 | 360 | 4,845 | Quarterfinals lost to (Serbia) Novak Djokovic [1] |
| 9 | 10 | (Spain) David Ferrer | 4,145 | 360 | 180 | 3,965 | Fourth round lost to (Japan) Kei Nishikori [5] |
| 10 | 11 | (Bulgaria) Grigor Dimitrov | 3,645 | 360 | 180 | 3,465 | Fourth round lost to (United Kingdom) Andy Murray [6] |
| 11 | 13 | (Latvia) Ernests Gulbis | 2,455 | 45 | 10 | 2,420 | First round lost to (Australia) Thanasi Kokkinakis [WC] |
| 12 | 14 | (Spain) Feliciano López | 2,130 | 90 | 180 | 2,220 | Fourth round lost to (Canada) Milos Raonic [8] |
| 13 | 16 | (Spain) Roberto Bautista Agut | 2,110 | 180 | 45 | 1,975 | Second round lost to (Luxembourg) Gilles Müller |
| 14 | 15 | (South Africa) Kevin Anderson | 2,125 | 180 | 180 | 2,125 | Fourth round lost to (Spain) Rafael Nadal [3] |
| 15 | 17 | (Spain) Tommy Robredo | 2,015 | 180 | 10 | 1,845 | First round retired against (France) Édouard Roger-Vasselin |
| 16 | 18 | (Italy) Fabio Fognini | 1,790 | 180+80 | 10 | 1,540 | First round lost to (Colombia) Alejandro González |
| 17 | 19 | (France) Gaël Monfils | 1,770 | 90 | 45 | 1,725 | Second round lost to (Poland) Jerzy Janowicz |
| 18 | 20 | (France) Gilles Simon | 1,730 | 90 | 90 | 1,730 | Third round lost to (Spain) David Ferrer [9] |
| 19 | 21 | (United States) John Isner | 1,685 | 10 | 90 | 1,765 | Third round lost to (Luxembourg) Gilles Müller |
| 20 | 22 | (Belgium) David Goffin | 1,669 | (35)+55^{†} | 45+35 | 1,659 | Second round lost to (Cyprus) Marcos Baghdatis |
| 21 | 23 | (Ukraine) Alexandr Dolgopolov | 1,455 | 45 | 10 | 1,420 | First round lost to (Italy) Paolo Lorenzi |
| 22 | 24 | (Germany) Philipp Kohlschreiber | 1,415 | 0 | 45 | 1,460 | Second round lost to (Australia) Bernard Tomic |
| 23 | 27 | (Croatia) Ivo Karlović | 1,365 | 10 | 45 | 1,400 | Second round lost to (Australia) Nick Kyrgios |
| 24 | 28 | (France) Richard Gasquet | 1,350 | 90+40 | 90 | 1,310 | Third round lost to (South Africa) Kevin Anderson [14] |
| 25 | 25 | (France) Julien Benneteau | 1,390 | 45 | 10 | 1,355 | First round lost to (Germany) Benjamin Becker |
| 26 | 26 | (Argentina) Leonardo Mayer | 1,389 | 45 | 45 | 1,389 | Second round lost to (Serbia) Viktor Troicki |
| 27 | 29 | (Uruguay) Pablo Cuevas | 1,227 | (20)^{†} | 10 | 1,217 | First round lost to (Germany) Matthias Bachinger [Q] |
| 28 | 30 | (Czech Republic) Lukáš Rosol | 1,210 | 10 | 45 | 1,245 | Second round lost to (Israel) Dudi Sela |
| 29 | 31 | (France) Jérémy Chardy | 1,195 | 90 | 45 | 1,150 | Second round lost to (Italy) Andreas Seppi |
| 30 | 32 | (Colombia) Santiago Giraldo | 1,175 | 10 | 45 | 1,210 | Second round lost to (United States) Steve Johnson |
| 31 | 33 | (Spain) Fernando Verdasco | 1,135 | 45 | 90 | 1,180 | Third round lost to (Serbia) Novak Djokovic [1] |
| 32 | 34 | (Slovakia) Martin Kližan | 1,133 | 106 | 45 | 1,072 | Second round retired against (Portugal) João Sousa |

The following players would have been seeded, but they withdrew from the event.

| Rank | Player | Points Before | Points defending | Points won | Points after | Withdrawal reason |
|---|---|---|---|---|---|---|
| 9 | (Croatia) Marin Čilić | 4,150 | 45 | 0 | 4,105 | Shoulder injury |
| 12 | (France) Jo-Wilfried Tsonga | 2,740 | 180+40 | 0+40 | 2,520 | Forearm inflammation |

†The player did not qualify for the tournament in 2014. Accordingly, this was the 18th best result deducted instead.

=== Women's singles ===
| Seed | Rank | Player | Points Before | Points defending | Points won | Points after | Status |
|---|---|---|---|---|---|---|---|
| 1 | 1 | (United States) Serena Williams | 8,016 | 240 | 2,000 | 9,776 | Champion, defeated (Russia) Maria Sharapova [2] |
| 2 | 2 | (Russia) Maria Sharapova | 7,335 | 240+185 | 1,300 | 8,210 | Runner-up, lost to (United States) Serena Williams [1] |
| 3 | 3 | (Romania) Simona Halep | 6,571 | 430 | 430 | 6,571 | Quarterfinals lost to (Russia) Ekaterina Makarova [10] |
| 4 | 4 | (Czech Republic) Petra Kvitová | 6,360 | 10 | 130 | 6,480 | Third round lost to (United States) Madison Keys |
| 5 | 5 | (Serbia) Ana Ivanovic | 4,845 | 430 | 10 | 4,425 | First round lost to (Czech Republic) Lucie Hradecká [Q] |
| 6 | 6 | (Poland) Agnieszka Radwańska | 4,810 | 780 | 240 | 4,270 | Fourth round lost to (United States) Venus Williams [18] |
| 7 | 7 | (Canada) Eugenie Bouchard | 4,715 | 780 | 430 | 4,365 | Quarterfinals lost to (Russia) Maria Sharapova [2] |
| 8 | 8 | (Denmark) Caroline Wozniacki | 4,625 | 130 | 70 | 4,565 | Second round lost to (Belarus) Victoria Azarenka |
| 9 | 9 | (Germany) Angelique Kerber | 3,360 | 240 | 10 | 3,130 | First round lost to (Romania) Irina-Camelia Begu |
| 10 | 11 | (Russia) Ekaterina Makarova | 2,970 | 240+280 | 780+55 | 3,285 | Semifinals lost to (Russia) Maria Sharapova [2] |
| 11 | 10 | (Slovakia) Dominika Cibulková | 3,007 | 1,300 | 430 | 2,137 | Quarterfinals lost to (United States) Serena Williams [1] |
| 12 | 12 | (Italy) Flavia Pennetta | 2,861 | 430 | 10 | 2,441 | First round lost to (Italy) Camila Giorgi |
| 13 | 13 | (Germany) Andrea Petkovic | 2,780 | 10+100 | 10+55 | 2,735 | First round lost to (United States) Madison Brengle |
| 14 | 14 | (Italy) Sara Errani | 2,735 | 10+305 | 130+1 | 2,551 | Third round lost to (Belgium) Yanina Wickmayer |
| 15 | 15 | (Serbia) Jelena Janković | 2,590 | 240 | 10 | 2,360 | First round lost to (Switzerland) Timea Bacsinszky |
| 16 | 16 | (Czech Republic) Lucie Šafářová | 2,545 | 130 | 10 | 2,425 | First round lost to (Kazakhstan) Yaroslava Shvedova |
| 17 | 17 | (Spain) Carla Suárez Navarro | 2,415 | 130 | 10 | 2,295 | First round lost to (Germany) Carina Witthöft |
| 18 | 18 | (United States) Venus Williams | 2,370 | 10 | 430 | 2,790 | Quarterfinals lost to (United States) Madison Keys |
| 19 | 19 | (France) Alizé Cornet | 2,255 | 130+185 | 130+55 | 2,125 | Third round lost to (Slovakia) Dominika Cibulková [11] |
| 20 | 21 | (Australia) Samantha Stosur | 1,895 | 130 | 70 | 1,835 | Second round lost to (United States) CoCo Vandeweghe |
| 21 | 22 | (China) Peng Shuai | 1,880 | 10+60 | 240+30 | 2,080 | Fourth round lost to (Russia) Maria Sharapova [2] |
| 22 | 20 | (Czech Republic) Karolína Plíšková | 2,075 | 70+180 | 130+60 | 2,015 | Third round lost to (Russia) Ekaterina Makarova [10] |
| 23 | 25 | (Russia) Anastasia Pavlyuchenkova | 1,820 | 130+470 | 10+1 | 1,231 | First round lost to (Belgium) Yanina Wickmayer |
| 24 | 24 | (Spain) Garbiñe Muguruza | 1,845 | 240 | 240 | 1,845 | Fourth round lost to (United States) Serena Williams [1] |
| 25 | 23 | (Czech Republic) Barbora Záhlavová-Strýcová | 1,870 | 70 | 130 | 1,930 | Third round lost to (Belarus) Victoria Azarenka |
| 26 | 26 | (Ukraine) Elina Svitolina | 1,780 | 130+100 | 130+60 | 1,740 | Third round lost to (United States) Serena Williams [1] |
| 27 | 27 | (Russia) Svetlana Kuznetsova | 1,730 | 10+30 | 10+1 | 1,701 | First round lost to (France) Caroline Garcia |
| 28 | 28 | (Germany) Sabine Lisicki | 1,681 | 70+30 | 10+1 | 1,592 | First round lost to (France) Kristina Mladenovic |
| 29 | 29 | (Australia) Casey Dellacqua | 1,542 | 240 | 70 | 1,372 | Second round lost to (United States) Madison Keys |
| 30 | 30 | (United States) Varvara Lepchenko | 1,480 | 70 | 130 | 1,540 | Third round lost to (Poland) Agnieszka Radwańska [6] |
| 31 | 31 | (Kazakhstan) Zarina Diyas | 1,460 | 170 | 130 | 1,420 | Third round lost to (Russia) Maria Sharapova [2] |
| 32 | 34 | (Switzerland) Belinda Bencic | 1,391 | 110+12 | 10+1 | 1,280 | First round lost to (Germany) Julia Görges |

== Doubles seeds ==
=== Men's doubles ===
| Team | | Rank^{1} | Seed |
|---|---|---|---|
| (United States) Bob Bryan | (United States) Mike Bryan | 2 | 1 |
| (France) Julien Benneteau | (France) Édouard Roger-Vasselin | 11 | 2 |
| (Spain) Marcel Granollers | (Spain) Marc López | 17 | 3 |
| (Croatia) Ivan Dodig | (Brazil) Marcelo Melo | 19 | 4 |
| (Austria) Alexander Peya | (Brazil) Bruno Soares | 20 | 5 |
| (Netherlands) Jean-Julien Rojer | (Romania) Horia Tecău | 32 | 6 |
| (India) Rohan Bopanna | (Canada) Daniel Nestor | 34 | 7 |
| (Pakistan) Aisam-ul-Haq Qureshi | (Serbia) Nenad Zimonjić | 40 | 8 |
| (Sweden) Robert Lindstedt | (Poland) Marcin Matkowski | 40 | 9 |
| (South Africa) Raven Klaasen | (India) Leander Paes | 44 | 10 |
| (Colombia) Juan Sebastián Cabal | (Colombia) Robert Farah | 45 | 11 |
| (United States) Eric Butorac | (Australia) Sam Groth | 51 | 12 |
| (Austria) Julian Knowle | (Canada) Vasek Pospisil | 56 | 13 |
| (United Kingdom) Dominic Inglot | (Romania) Florin Mergea | 73 | 14 |
| (Croatia) Marin Draganja | (Finland) Henri Kontinen | 74 | 15 |
| (United Kingdom) Jamie Murray | (Australia) John Peers | 77 | 16 |

- ^{1} Rankings were as of 12 January 2015.

=== Women's doubles ===
| Team | | Rank^{1} | Seed |
|---|---|---|---|
| (Italy) Sara Errani | (Italy) Roberta Vinci | 2 | 1 |
| (Chinese Taipei) Hsieh Su-wei | (India) Sania Mirza | 11 | 2 |
| (Russia) Ekaterina Makarova | (Russia) Elena Vesnina | 14 | 3 |
| (Switzerland) Martina Hingis | (Italy) Flavia Pennetta | 23 | 4 |
| (United States) Raquel Kops-Jones | (United States) Abigail Spears | 24 | 5 |
| (Spain) Garbiñe Muguruza | (Spain) Carla Suárez Navarro | 33 | 6 |
| (France) Caroline Garcia | (Slovenia) Katarina Srebotnik | 35 | 7 |
| (Chinese Taipei) Chan Hao-ching | (Czech Republic) Květa Peschke | 37 | 8 |
| (Czech Republic) Andrea Hlaváčková | (Czech Republic) Lucie Hradecká | 38 | 9 |
| (Hungary) Tímea Babos | (France) Kristina Mladenovic | 39 | 10 |
| (Spain) Anabel Medina Garrigues | (Kazakhstan) Yaroslava Shvedova | 47 | 11 |
| (Russia) Alla Kudryavtseva | (Russia) Anastasia Pavlyuchenkova | 49 | 12 |
| (Netherlands) Michaëlla Krajicek | (Czech Republic) Barbora Záhlavová-Strýcová | 61 | 13 |
| (Chinese Taipei) Chan Yung-jan | (China) Zheng Jie | 63 | 14 |
| (Japan) Kimiko Date-Krumm | (Australia) Casey Dellacqua | 63 | 15 |
| (Germany) Julia Görges | (Germany) Anna-Lena Grönefeld | 72 | 16 |

- ^{1} Rankings are as of 12 January 2015.

=== Mixed doubles ===
| Team | | Rank^{1} | Seed |
|---|---|---|---|
| (India) Sania Mirza | (Brazil) Bruno Soares | 16 | 1 |
| (Slovenia) Katarina Srebotnik | (Brazil) Marcelo Melo | 18 | 2 |
| (France) Kristina Mladenovic | (Canada) Daniel Nestor | 22 | 3 |
| (Czech Republic) Andrea Hlaváčková | (Austria) Alexander Peya | 25 | 4 |
| (Zimbabwe) Cara Black | (Colombia) Juan Sebastián Cabal | 26 | 5 |
| (Kazakhstan) Yaroslava Shvedova | (Serbia) Nenad Zimonjić | 28 | 6 |
| (Switzerland) Martina Hingis | (India) Leander Paes | 34 | 7 |
| (Czech Republic) Květa Peschke | (Poland) Marcin Matkowski | 37 | 8 |

- ^{1} Rankings are as of 12 January 2015.

== Main draw wildcard entries ==
As part of an agreement between Tennis Australia, the United States Tennis Association (USTA) and the French Tennis Federation (FFT), one male and one female player from the United States and France received a wild card into the Australian Open singles event. USTA gave it to Denis Kudla and Irina Falconi, thanks to their positions in 2014 USTA Pro Circuit's Australian Open Wild Card Challenge standing, while Lucas Pouille and Océane Dodin were chosen by internal FFT selection.

Further four wildcards were awarded at Asia-Pacific Australian Open Wildcard Playoff into the men's and women's singles and doubles main draw events, while Tennis Australia organized its own playoff competitions, where Jordan Thompson, Daria Gavrilova and Sam Thompson & Masa Jovanovic mixed doubles team received entries to Australian Open.

Remaining wildcard places were filled by Australian internal selection.

Men's singles

- (Australia) James Duckworth
- (Australia) Thanasi Kokkinakis
- (United States) Denis Kudla
- (Australia) John Millman
- (France) Lucas Pouille
- (Australia) Luke Saville
- (Australia) Jordan Thompson
- (China) Zhang Ze

Women's singles

- (Chinese Taipei) Chang Kai-chen
- (France) Océane Dodin
- (China) Duan Yingying
- (United States) Irina Falconi
- (Australia) Daria Gavrilova
- (Australia) Arina Rodionova
- (Australia) Olivia Rogowska
- (Australia) Storm Sanders

Men's doubles

- (Australia) Alex Bolt / (Australia) Andrew Whittington
- (Australia) James Duckworth / (Australia) Luke Saville
- (Australia) Matthew Ebden / (Australia) Matt Reid
- (Australia) Omar Jasika / (Australia) John-Patrick Smith
- (Australia) Thanasi Kokkinakis / (Australia) Nick Kyrgios
- (Chinese Taipei) Lee Hsin-han / (China) Zhang Ze
- (Australia) John Millman / (Australia) Benjamin Mitchell

Women's doubles

- (Australia) Monique Adamczak / (Australia) Olivia Rogowska
- (Australia) Naiktha Bains / (Australia) Sara Tomic
- (Australia) Kimberly Birrell / (Australia) Priscilla Hon
- (Australia) Daria Gavrilova / (Australia) Storm Sanders
- (Australia) Maddison Inglis / (Australia) Alexandra Nancarrow
- (Australia) Jessica Moore / (Australia) Abbie Myers
- (China) Yang Zhaoxuan / (China) Ye Qiuyu

Mixed doubles

- (Chinese Taipei) Chang Kai-chen / (China) Zhang Ze
- (Australia) Casey Dellacqua / (Australia) John Peers
- (Australia) Jarmila Gajdošová / (India) Mahesh Bhupathi
- (Australia) Daria Gavrilova / (Australia) Luke Saville
- (Australia) Masa Jovanovic / (Australia) Sam Thompson
- (Slovenia) Andreja Klepač / (Australia) Chris Guccione
- (Australia) Arina Rodionova / (Belarus) Max Mirnyi

== Main draw qualifier entries ==
The qualifying competition took place in Melbourne Park on 14 – 17 January 2015.

=== Men's singles ===
Men's singles qualifiers

1. (Germany) Tim Pütz
2. (Austria) Jürgen Melzer
3. (Sweden) Elias Ymer
4. (United States) Tim Smyczek
5. (Germany) Matthias Bachinger
6. (Czech Republic) Jan Hernych
7. (Slovenia) Aljaž Bedene
8. (Chinese Taipei) Jimmy Wang
9. (United States) Michael Russell
10. (Belgium) Ruben Bemelmans
11. (Romania) Marius Copil
12. (United Kingdom) Kyle Edmund
13. (Russia) Alexander Kudryavtsev
14. (Ukraine) Illya Marchenko
15. (India) Yuki Bhambri
16. (France) Laurent Lokoli

Lucky loser

1. (Japan) Hiroki Moriya

=== Women's singles ===
Women's singles qualifiers

1. (Czech Republic) Denisa Allertová
2. (France) Stéphanie Foretz
3. (Czech Republic) Renata Voráčová
4. (Germany) Tatjana Maria
5. (Russia) Alexandra Panova
6. (Czech Republic) Lucie Hradecká
7. (Tunisia) Ons Jabeur
8. (Poland) Urszula Radwańska
9. (Netherlands) Richèl Hogenkamp
10. (Russia) Evgeniya Rodina
11. (United States) Anna Tatishvili
12. (Croatia) Petra Martić

Lucky loser

1. (Kazakhstan) Yulia Putintseva

== Protected ranking ==
The following players were accepted directly into the main draw using a protected ranking:

Men's singles

- ~~(Argentina) Juan Martín del Potro (7)~~
- (France) Stéphane Robert (103)

Women's singles

- (Russia) Vera Zvonareva (15)
- (Switzerland) Romina Oprandi (40)
- (United States) Bethanie Mattek-Sands (52)

== Withdrawals ==
The following players were accepted directly into the main tournament but withdrew.

Men's singles

- ‡ (United States) Jack Sock (42) → replaced by (Argentina) Máximo González (103)
- ‡ (Germany) Tommy Haas (77) → replaced by (France) Stéphane Robert (103 PR)
- ‡ (Serbia) Janko Tipsarević (39 PR) → replaced by (Turkey) Marsel İlhan (104)
- ‡ (Czech Republic) Radek Štěpánek (68) → replaced by (Slovenia) Blaž Kavčič (105)
- ‡ (France) Jo-Wilfried Tsonga (12) → replaced by (France) Kenny de Schepper (106)
- ‡ (Croatia) Marin Čilić (9) → replaced by (United Kingdom) James Ward (107)
- § (Argentina) Juan Martín del Potro (7 PR) → replaced by (Japan) Hiroki Moriya (LL)

Women's singles

- † (Czech Republic) Petra Cetkovská (58) → replaced by (Belgium) Alison Van Uytvanck (106)
- § (Slovakia) Jana Čepelová (56) → replaced by (Kazakhstan) Yulia Putintseva (LL)

† – not included on entry list
‡ – withdrew from entry list
§ – withdrew from main draw

== Retirements ==
Men's singles

- (Germany) Peter Gojowczyk
- (Slovakia) Martin Kližan
- (France) Adrian Mannarino
- (Spain) Tommy Robredo

| Preceded by 2014 US Open | Grand Slams | Succeeded by 2015 French Open |
