= Sam Thompson (tennis) =

Australian tennis player

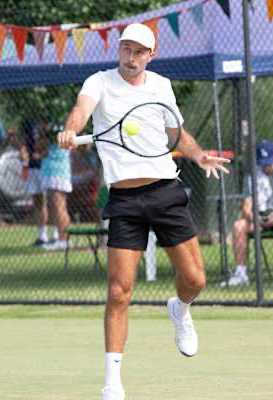
- Full name: Samuel Thompson
- Country (sports): Australia
- Residence: Melbourne, Australia
- Born: 8 January 1993 (age 33)
- Plays: Right-handed (one-handed backhand)
- Coach: Warren Maher
- Prize money: $5176

Singles
- Career record: 0–1
- Career titles: 0
- Highest ranking: 1671

Doubles
- Career record: 1–1
- Career titles: 0

Grand Slam mixed doubles results
- Australian Open: 1R (2015)
- Last updated on: 3 Aug 2023.

Samuel Thompson (born 8 January 1993) is an Australian professional tennis player.

Alongside Masa Jovanovic, he won the mixed-doubles Wildcard Playoff into the 2015 Australian Open where they faced off against Martina Hingis and Leander Paes in the main draw, losing 2–6, 6–7^{(2–7)}.

Thompson has represented Australia multiple times, competing in the 2011, 2013 and 2015 Summer Universiade's. In 2011, he made the quarter finals in mixed doubles.

Thompson served as a captain for Melbourne University Sport, and was awarded Athlete of the Year in 2012.

Thompson holds a Bachelor of Science degree in Physics and a Master of Science degree in Mathematics.

== Career ==
Thompson made his ITF debut playing singles in September 2012 at the Australia F8.

Thompson made his ITF doubles debut in March 2015 at the Australia F4 where he reached the quarter finals.

Thompson plays for Grace Park Tennis Club. Thompson also competed for the Tasmania Devils of the Asia-Pacific Tennis League in 2015.

In 2015, Thompson won the Bendigo Championships in singles. In 2023, he also won the Shepparton Lawn Tennis Club Singles Championships.
