= Benjamin Mitchell (tennis) =

Australian tennis player (born 1992)

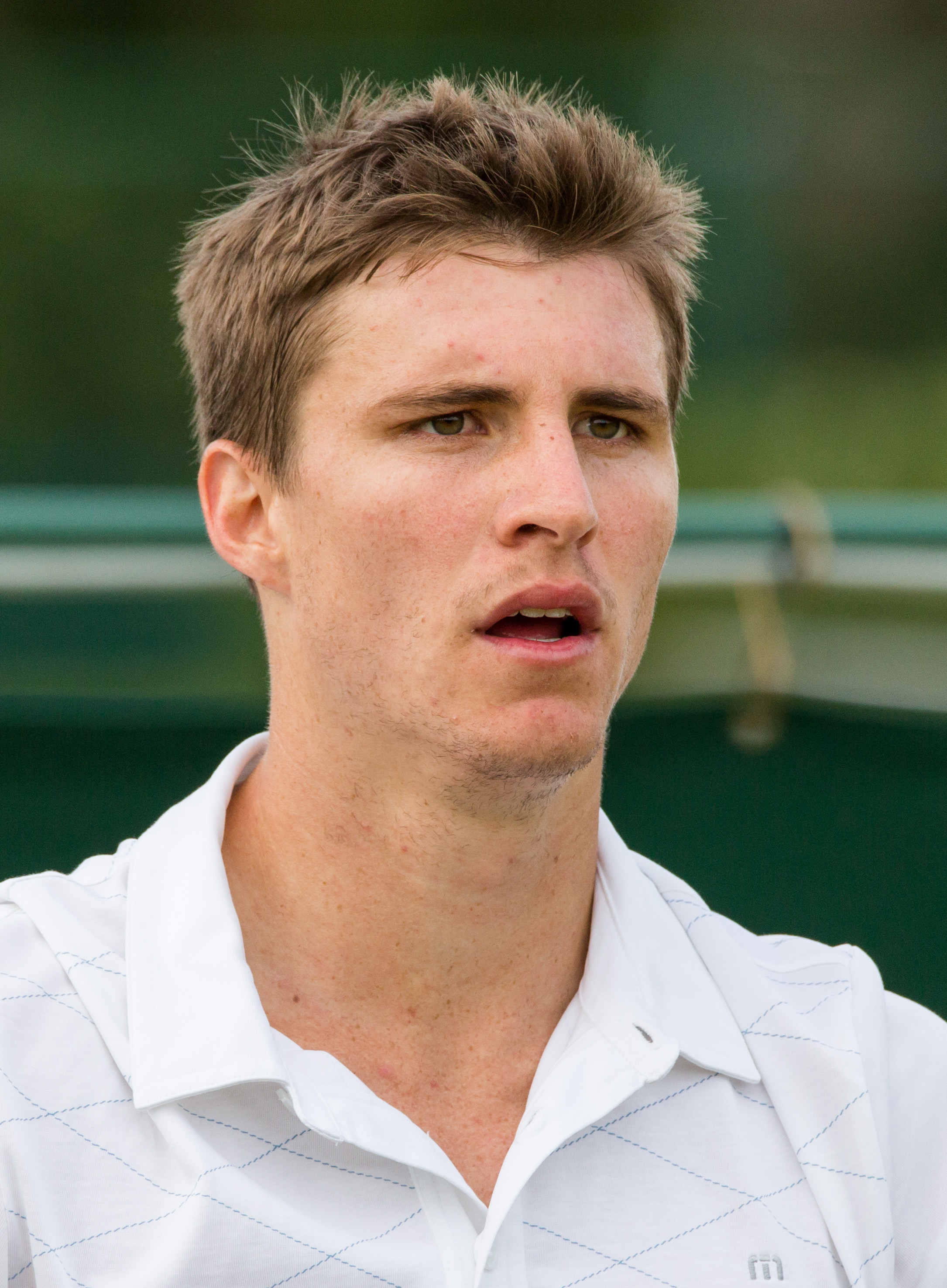
- Mitchell at the 2015 Wimbledon qualifying tournament
- Country (sports): Australia
- Residence: Gold Coast, Australia
- Born: 30 November 1992 (age 33) Gold Coast, Queensland, Australia
- Height: 6 ft 0 in (183 cm)
- Turned pro: 2008
- Plays: Right-handed (two-handed backhand)
- Coach: Desmond Tyson
- Prize money: $302,377

Singles
- Career record: 0–5
- Career titles: 0
- Highest ranking: No. 204 (2 March 2015)

Grand Slam singles results
- Australian Open: 1R (2012, 2013)
- French Open: Q1 (2012, 2015, 2016)
- Wimbledon: Q2 (2015)
- US Open: Q1 (2014, 2016)

Doubles
- Career record: 1–4
- Career titles: 0
- Highest ranking: No. 303 (27 January 2014)

Grand Slam doubles results
- Australian Open: 2R (2014)

Grand Slam mixed doubles results
- Australian Open: 1R (2012, 2016)
- Last updated on: 15 July 2021.

Benjamin "Ben" Mitchell (born 30 November 1992) is an Australian professional tennis player who as of March 2021 is unranked by the Association of Tennis Professionals (ATP).

As a junior, Mitchell enjoyed a successful career in which he reached one junior grand slam singles final at the 2010 Wimbledon Championships and reached a ranking of World No. 20. In January 2012, he competed in his first ATP main draw event at the Brisbane International. His last appearance, to date, was at an ITF event in Toowoomba, Australia, in October 2018.

== Personal life ==
Mitchell is the younger brother of former Home and Away actor, Luke Mitchell. Mitchell comes from a tennis-loving family and also has three other brothers, Michael, Daniel and Andrew and one sister, Bree. He has a daughter named Zara.

In December 2015, Mitchell withdrew from the final round of the 2016 Australian Open Main Draw Wildcard playoff to be present for the birth of his daughter. Mitchell has coached at Brisbane Boys College.

== Junior career ==
Mitchell competed in his first junior ITF under 18 event in December 2005 as a 13-year-old, he was beaten soundly in the first round by James Wong 6–3 6–1. Mitchell had varying success between Australian and New Zealand tournaments through 2006–2008 which included his first final in Darwin. Mitchell stopped playing junior tournaments in 2009 to focus on senior tournaments and in doing so entered his last season as a junior in 2010 without a ranking. Tennis Australia provided wildcards into the Traralgon International and the Australian Open junior event and Mitchell did not disappoint. He reached the final of the Traralgon International and the quarterfinals of the Australian Open juniors event. Following his successful Australian summer Mitchell won his first and only junior title in Nonthaburi, Thailand where he defeated Suk-Young Jeong in the final 7–5 6–3.

In the last event Mitchell ever entered he recorded his best result as he went through qualifying to reach the final of the 2010 Junior Wimbledon Championships where he lost in straight sets to Márton Fucsovics 4–6 4–6.

=== Junior singles titles (1) ===
Legend (singles)
Grand Slam (0)
Grade A (0)
Grade B (0)
Grade 1–5 (1)

| No. | Date | Tournament | Surface | Opponent | Score |
|---|---|---|---|---|---|
| 1. | 13 March 2010 | Nonthaburi | Hard | (South Korea) Suk-Young Jeong | 7–5, 6–3 |

== Junior Grand Slam finals ==
=== Singles: 1 (1 runner-up) ===
| Result | Year | Tournament | Surface | Opponent | Score |
|---|---|---|---|---|---|
| Loss | 2010 | Wimbledon | Grass | (Hungary) Marton Fucsovics | 4–6, 4–6 |

== Professional career ==
=== 2010 – 2012 ===
In June, Mitchell participated in a futures tournament in Australia, where he lost in straight sets in the first round to Krishananth Balakrishnan of Australia. In November 2010, Mitchell entered the Australian Open Wild Card Play-offs, hoping to win himself a main draw wild card for the 2011 Australian Open. However, Mitchell lost to fellow Australian and fourth seed, Matthew Ebden in the quarterfinals.

At the 2011 Australian Open, Mitchell received a wild card into the Men's Doubles along with James Duckworth, but they were defeated in the first round by Daniel Nestor and Max Mirnyi.

Mitchell won his first futures title in February (Australia F2) against Michael Look.

Mitchell played in the 2012 Australian Open but lost in the first round to John Isner 4–6, 4–6, 6–7.

=== 2013 ===
Mitchell started his year at the 2013 Brisbane International after he was awarded a wildcard. He lost in the first round to Marcos Baghdatis in straight sets. Mitchell received a wildcard into the 2013 Australian Open after winning the Australian Open Wildcard Playoff. He lost to countrymen James Duckworth in the first round in five sets. Mitchell then had two consecutive first round losses. The first at the 2013 McDonald's Burnie International to top seed John Millman and then at the 2013 Charles Sturt Adelaide International to Suk-Young Jeong.

In October, Mitchell won the Melbourne Challenger pairing Thanasi Kokkinakis. This was his first challenger title. However he lost in the opening round of the singles to Bradley Klahn in straight sets. Mitchell then reached the quarterfinals of the Traralgon Challenger where he lost to James Duckworth.

=== 2014 ===
Mitchell began his year at the 2014 Brisbane International in qualifying where he defeated seventh seed Wayne Odesnik in the first round in straight sets. He lost in the second round in a third set tiebreak to Pierre-Hugues Herbert. Mitchell then played in qualifying at the 2014 Australian Open where he lost in the first round against John-Patrick Smith in straight sets. Mitchell partnered with Jordan Thompson in the Men's Doubles where they won their first round over Carlos Berlocq and Alejandro González in three sets. This marked the first match win that Mitchell or Thompson had at a Grand Slam. They lost in the second round against 14th seeds and eventual champions Łukasz Kubot and Robert Lindstedt. Mitchell then competed at the Burnie International where he defeated Luke Saville in the first round. He retired in the quarter-finals. Mitchell lost in the first round of qualification for Wimbledon to Marius Copil. On 6 July, Mitchell won his first title of the year at the Canada F4, defeating the #1 seed Filip Peliwo 6–3, 2–6, 6–4.

=== 2015: career high ===
Mitchell lost in the first round of qualifying for the Australian Open to eventual qualifier Illya Marchenko before playing two challengers in Tasmania where he made the semi-final in Burnie and quarter final in Launceston. In late February, Mitchell made the second round of the Shimadzu Challenger where he won the doubles with Jordan Thompson. Mitchell reached a career high of 204 on 2 March 2015. In March, Mitchell played two events in China. He lost to eventual winner Kimmer Coppejans in round 1 of Guangzhou challenger and retired with a back injury in round 1 of the Shenzhen challenger. Mitchell didn't play again until the 2015 French Open where he lost in round 1 of qualifying before turning to grass, where he lost in round 1 of the Manchester Challenger to eventual winner Sam Groth. Mitchell then attempted to qualify for Wimbledon but lost in the second round. Mitchell won his first Challenger tournament, the Canberra International, defeating compatriot Luke Saville in the final 5–7 6–0 6–1.

=== 2016: hiatus ===
Mitchell commenced 2016 with a wild card into the 2016 Brisbane International but lost in round 1 to Tobias Kamke. He made the second round of qualifying for the 2016 Australian Open and the quarter-final of the Launceston Challenger before heading to Asia and North America. Mitchell returned to Australia in September and played two Futures tournaments. In November 2016, Mitchell decided to take an indefinite break from tennis until the "fire in the belly" returns.

=== 2017: return ===
In September Mitchell returned to play after a 10-month hiatus at the Australia F4 in Alice Springs. Mitchell told Tennis Australia "It’s early days, my first tournament back, but obviously I’m refreshed mentally" adding "I feel like I want to be here and I want to do well, so there’s obviously been a big change in mindset". He lost in the second round. The following week, Mitchell made the final of the Australia F5 in Brisbane, losing to Bradley Mousley. He played the rest of the season in Australia, ending the year with a ranking of 734.

== ATP Challenger and ITF Futures finals ==
=== Singles: 19 (10–9) ===
| Legend ATP Challenger (1–0) ITF Futures (9–9) | Finals by surface Hard (8–9) Clay (1–0) Grass (1–0) Carpet (0–0) |

| Result | W–L | Date | Tournament | Tier | Surface | Opponent | Score |
|---|---|---|---|---|---|---|---|
| Loss | 0–1 | Dec 2010 | Australia F13, Bendigo | Futures | Hard | (Australia) Sam Groth | 6–7^{(7–9)}, 4–6 |
| Win | 1–1 | Mar 2011 | Australia F2, Berri | Futures | Grass | (Australia) Michael Look | 2–6, 6–4, 6–3 |
| Win | 2–1 | Jun 2011 | Spain F21, Melilla | Futures | Hard | (Spain) Roberto Ortega-Olmedo | 6–3, 6–1 |
| Loss | 2–2 | Jul 2011 | Great Britain F11, Chiswick | Futures | Hard | (United Kingdom) Chris Eaton | 5–7, 1–6 |
| Loss | 2–3 | Sep 2011 | Australia F5, Alice Springs | Futures | Hard | (Australia) Michael Look | 4–6, 4–6 |
| Loss | 2–4 | Sep 2011 | Australia F6, Cairns | Futures | Hard | (Australia) James Lemke | 1–6, 6–4, 3–6 |
| Win | 3–4 | Oct 2011 | Australia F8, Esperance | Futures | Hard | (Australia) Matt Reid | 6–1, 6–4 |
| Loss | 3–5 | Oct 2011 | Australia F9, Kalgoorlie | Futures | Hard | (Australia) Brydan Klein | 5–7, 3–6 |
| Win | 4–5 | Nov 2011 | Australia F12, Traralgon | Futures | Hard | (New Zealand) Michael Venus | 7–6^{(7–3)}, 6–7^{(2–7)}, 6–0 |
| Loss | 4–6 | Nov 2011 | Australia F13, Bendigo | Futures | Hard | (Australia) Matt Reid | 6–7^{(6–8)}, 6–4, 1–6 |
| Win | 5–6 | Oct 2012 | Australia F11, Traralgon | Futures | Hard | (Australia) Luke Saville | 6–3, 2–6, 6–1 |
| Loss | 5–7 | Nov 2012 | Australia F12, Bendigo | Futures | Hard | (Australia) John Millman | 3–6, 3–6 |
| Win | 6–7 | May 2013 | Thailand F1, Bangkok | Futures | Hard | (India) Karunuday Singh | 6–3, 1–6, 7–6^{(7–2)} |
| Win | 7–7 | Jun 2013 | Korea F5, Gyeongsan | Futures | Hard | (Japan) Hiroki Kondo | 7–6^{(7–4)}, 7–6^{(7–3)} |
| Win | 8–7 | Jul 2014 | Canada F4, Kelowna | Futures | Hard | (Canada) Filip Peliwo | 6–3, 2–6, 6–4 |
| Loss | 8–8 | Dec 2014 | Thailand F11, Bangkok | Futures | Hard | (Thailand) Danai Udomchoke | 0–6, 6–3, 3–6 |
| Win | 9–8 | Nov 2015 | Canberra, Australia | Challenger | Clay | (Australia) Luke Saville | 5–7, 6–0, 6–1 |
| Win | 10–8 | Nov 2015 | Australia F10, Wollongong | Futures | Hard | (Germany) Sebastian Fanselow | 6–1, 6–4 |
| Loss | 10–9 | Oct 2017 | Australia F5, Brisbane | Futures | Hard | (Australia) Bradley Mousley | 6–3. 4–6, 2–6 |

=== Doubles: 5 (3–2) ===
| Legend ATP Challenger (2–1) ITF Futures (1–1) | Finals by surface Hard (3–2) Clay (0–0) Grass (0–0) Carpet (0–0) |

| Result | W–L | Date | Tournament | Tier | Surface | Partner | Opponents | Score |
|---|---|---|---|---|---|---|---|---|
| Win | 1–0 | Oct 2012 | Australia F9, Esperance | Futures | Hard | (Australia) Alex Bolt | (Australia) Adam Feeney (Australia) Zach Itzstein | 6–2, 6–3 |
| Win | 2–0 | Oct 2013 | Melbourne, Australia | Challenger | Hard | (Australia) Thanasi Kokkinakis | (Australia) Andrew Whittington (Australia) Alex Bolt | 6–3, 6–2 |
| Win | 3–0 | Mar 2015 | Kyoto, Japan | Challenger | Hard | (Australia) Jordan Thompson | (Japan) Go Soeda (Japan) Yasutaka Uchiyama | 6–3, 6–2 |
| Loss | 3–1 | Aug 2015 | Thailand F6, Bangkok | Futures | Hard | (Australia) Jordan Thompson | (Japan) Toshihide Matsui (Indonesia) Christopher Rungkat | 6–4, 3–6, [9–11] |
| Loss | 3–2 | Jul 2016 | Winnipeg, Canada | Challenger | Hard | (Australia) Jarryd Chaplin | (United States) Mitchell Krueger (United States) Daniel Nguyen | 2–6, 5–7 |

== Grand Slam singles performance timeline ==
Key
| W | F | SF | QF | #R | RR | Q# | DNQ | A | NH |

(W) winner; (F) finalist; (SF) semifinalist; (QF) quarterfinalist; (#R) rounds 4, 3, 2, 1; (RR) round-robin stage; (Q#) qualification round; (DNQ) did not qualify; (A) absent; (NH) not held; (SR) strike rate (events won / competed); (W–L) win–loss record.
To avoid confusion and double counting, these charts are updated at the conclusion of a tournament or when the player's participation has ended.

| Tournament | 2010 | 2011 | 2012 | 2013 | 2014 | 2015 | 2016 | 2017 | SR | W–L | Win% |
|---|---|---|---|---|---|---|---|---|---|---|---|
Grand Slam tournaments
| Australian Open | Q1 | Q1 | 1R | 1R | Q1 | Q1 | Q2 | A | 0 / 2 | 0–2 | 0% |
| French Open | A | A | Q1 | A | A | Q1 | Q1 | A | 0 / 0 | 0–0 | – |
| Wimbledon | A | A | Q1 | A | Q1 | Q2 | A | A | 0 / 0 | 0–0 | – |
| US Open | A | A | A | A | Q1 | A | Q1 | A | 0 / 0 | 0–0 | – |
| Win–loss | 0–0 | 0–0 | 0–1 | 0–1 | 0–0 | 0–0 | 0–0 | 0–0 | 0 / 2 | 0–2 | 0% |
| Year-end Ranking | 612 | 227 | 327 | 265 | 236 | 231 | 494 | 735 | Prize Money: $302,377 | | |
