= 2025 Macedonian Open =

- Date: 19–24 May
- Edition: 3rd
- Surface: Clay
- Location: Skopje, North Macedonia

Champions

Singles
- (United Kingdom) Jay Clarke

Doubles
- (Czech Republic) Andrew Paulson / (Czech Republic) Michael Vrbenský
← 2024 ·	Macedonian Open	· 2026 →

The 2025 Macedonian Open was a professional tennis tournament played on clay courts. It was the third edition of the tournament which was part of the 2025 ATP Challenger Tour. It took place in Skopje, North Macedonia between 19 and 24 May 2025.

== Singles main-draw entrants ==
=== Seeds ===
Country	Player	Rank^{1}	Seed
BOL	Hugo Dellien	103	1
~~HUN~~	~~Zsombor Piros~~	~~204~~	~~2~~
GBR	Jay Clarke	233	3
ESP	Oriol Roca Batalla	240	4
NOR	Viktor Durasovic	246	5
	Marat Sharipov	247	6
NED	Max Houkes	249	7
CRO	Mili Poljičak	270	8

- ^{1} Rankings are as of 5 May 2025.

=== Other entrants ===
The following players received wildcards into the singles main draw:

- (North Macedonia) Kalin Ivanovski
- (Bulgaria) Yanaki Milev
- ~~(Croatia) Dino Prižmić~~

The following player received entry into the singles main draw through the Junior Accelerator programme:

- (Czech Republic) Maxim Mrva

The following player received entry into the singles main draw through the Next Gen Accelerator programme:

- (Austria) Joel Schwärzler

The following players received entry into the singles main draw as alternates:

- (Spain) Nicolás Álvarez Varona
- (Switzerland) Mika Brunold
- (Netherlands) Jelle Sels

The following players received entry from the qualifying draw:

- (Italy) Franco Agamenone
- (India) Manas Dhamne
- (Bosnia and Herzegovina) Nerman Fatić
- (United States) Toby Kodat
- (France) Lilian Marmousez
- (Austria) Neil Oberleitner

The following players received entry as lucky losers:

- (Croatia) Matej Dodig
- (Poland) Daniel Michalski

== Champions ==
=== Singles ===
- (United Kingdom) Jay Clarke def. (Bosnia and Herzegovina) Nerman Fatić 6–2, 6–3.

=== Doubles ===
- (Czech Republic) Andrew Paulson / (Czech Republic) Michael Vrbenský def. (India) Sriram Balaji / (Mexico) Miguel Ángel Reyes-Varela 2–6, 6–4, [10–6].
