= 2025 Macedonian Open – Singles =

Singles
- 2025 Macedonian Open

Final
- Champion: (United Kingdom) Jay Clarke
- Runner-up: (Bosnia and Herzegovina) Nerman Fatić
- Score: 6–2, 6–3

Events
Singles	Doubles
← 2024 ·	Macedonian Open	· 2026 →

Joel Schwärzler was the defending champion but lost in the quarterfinals to Jay Clarke.

Clarke won the title after defeating Nerman Fatić 6–2, 6–3 in the final.

== Seeds ==
1. (Bolivia) Hugo Dellien (semifinals)
2. (Hungary) Zsombor Piros (withdrew)
3. (United Kingdom) Jay Clarke (champion)
4. (Spain) Oriol Roca Batalla (second round)
5. (Norway) Viktor Durasovic (second round)
6. Marat Sharipov (second round)
7. (Netherlands) Max Houkes (first round)
8. (Croatia) Mili Poljičak (semifinals)

== Draw ==
=== Key ===
- Q = Qualifier
- WC = Wild card
- LL = Lucky loser
- Alt = Alternate
- ITF = ITF entry
- PR = Protected ranking
- SR = Special ranking
- SE = Special exempt
- JE = Junior exempt
- JR = Junior Accelerator Programme entrant
- CO = College Accelerator Programme entrant
- NG = Next Gen Accelerator Program entrant
- w/o = Walkover
- r = Retired
- d = Defaulted

=== Finals ===
Semifinals
1	(Bolivia) Hugo Dellien	6^{4}	3
3	(United Kingdom) Jay Clarke	7^{7}	6
8	(Croatia) Mili Poljičak	4	7	4
Q	(Bosnia and Herzegovina) Nerman Fatić	6	5	6

Final
3	(United Kingdom) Jay Clarke	6	6
Q	(Bosnia and Herzegovina) Nerman Fatić	2	3

=== Top half ===
First round
1	(Bolivia) H Dellien	6	6
Q	(United States) T Kodat	4	3
(Croatia) L Mikrut	3	4
Alt	(Switzerland) M Brunold	6	6
(France) C Denolly	7^{7}	6
(Norway) N Budkov Kjær	6^{2}	1
LL	(Poland) D Michalski	7^{7}	4	7^{10}
7	(Netherlands) M Houkes	6^{4}	6	6^{8}
3	(United Kingdom) J Clarke	6	6
Alt	(Netherlands) J Sels	3	2
(Argentina) P Cachin	6	6
Q	(India) M Dhamne	2	1
NG	(Austria) J Schwärzler	6	6
(Peru) G Bueno	4	3
WC	(Bulgaria) Y Milev	5	3
6	M Sharipov	7	6

Second round
1	(Bolivia) H Dellien	6	4	6
Alt	(Switzerland) M Brunold	1	6	4
(France) C Denolly	1	2
LL	(Poland) D Michalski	6	6
3	(United Kingdom) J Clarke	6	6
(Argentina) P Cachin	4	4
NG	(Austria) J Schwärzler	6	6
6	M Sharipov	2	4

Quarterfinals
1	(Bolivia) H Dellien	6	6
LL	(Poland) D Michalski	2	1
3	(United Kingdom) J Clarke	6	6
NG	(Austria) J Schwärzler	3	1

Semifinals
1	(Bolivia) H Dellien	6^{4}	3
3	(United Kingdom) J Clarke	7^{7}	6

=== Bottom half ===
First round
8	(Croatia) M Poljičak	6	6^{5}	6
WC	(North Macedonia) K Ivanovski	4	7^{7}	4
Q	(France) Lilian Marmousez	4	6	1
(Argentina) GA Olivieri	6	3	6
JR	(Czech Republic) M Mrva	2	1
(Belgium) M Geerts	6	6
Q	(Austria) N Oberleitner	7^{7}	3	4
4	(Spain) O Roca Batalla	6^{2}	6	6
5	(Norway) V Durasovic	4	6	7^{7}
(Italy) S Travaglia	6	4	6^{5}
Q	(Bosnia and Herzegovina) N Fatić	6	2	6
Alt	(Spain) N Álvarez Varona	3	6	4
Q	(Italy) F Agamenone	6	7
(Jordan) A Shelbayh	4	5
(Germany) C Negritu	6	4	6
LL	(Croatia) M Dodig	1	6	4

Second round
8	(Croatia) M Poljičak	7	6
(Argentina) GA Olivieri	5	3
(Belgium) M Geerts	0	6	7^{7}
4	(Spain) O Roca Batalla	6	4	6^{5}
5	(Norway) V Durasovic	3	4
Q	(Bosnia and Herzegovina) N Fatić	6	6
Q	(Italy) F Agamenone	4	6	1
(Germany) C Negritu	6	4	6

Quarterfinals
8	(Croatia) M Poljičak	7^{7}	6
(Belgium) M Geerts	6^{3}	1
Q	(Bosnia and Herzegovina) N Fatić	3	7^{8}	6
(Germany) C Negritu	6	6^{6}	2

Semifinals
8	(Croatia) M Poljičak	4	7	4
Q	(Bosnia and Herzegovina) N Fatić	6	5	6
