= 2023 Macedonian Open – Singles =

Singles
- 2023 Macedonian Open

Final
- Champion: (Hungary) Máté Valkusz
- Runner-up: (Argentina) Francisco Comesaña
- Score: 6–3, 6–4

Events
Singles	Doubles
- Macedonian Open

This was the first edition of the tournament.

Máté Valkusz won the title after defeating Francisco Comesaña 6–3, 6–4 in the final.

== Seeds ==
1. (Tunisia) Aziz Dougaz (quarterfinals)
2. Evgeny Donskoy (semifinals)
3. (Brazil) Matheus Pucinelli de Almeida (first round)
4. (Sweden) Dragoș Nicolae Mădăraș (semifinals)
5. (Argentina) Francisco Comesaña (final)
6. (Argentina) Román Andrés Burruchaga (second round)
7. (Lebanon) Benjamin Hassan (first round)
8. (Serbia) Miljan Zekić (first round, retired)

== Draw ==
Key

- Q = Qualifier
- WC = Wild card
- LL = Lucky loser
- Alt = Alternate
- ITF = ITF entry
- PR = Protected ranking
- SR = Special ranking
- SE = Special exempt
- JE = Junior exempt
- JR = Junior Accelerator Programme entrant
- CO = College Accelerator Programme entrant
- NG = Next Gen Accelerator Program entrant
- w/o = Walkover
- r = Retired
- d = Defaulted

=== Finals ===
Semifinals
Q	(Hungary) Máté Valkusz	6	7^{7}
4	(Sweden) Dragoș Nicolae Mădăraș	2	6^{3}
5	(Argentina) Francisco Comesaña	6	6
2	Evgeny Donskoy	3	1

Final
Q	(Hungary) Máté Valkusz	6	6
5	(Argentina) Francisco Comesaña	3	4

=== Top half ===
First round
1	(Tunisia) A Dougaz	3	6	6
(Germany) L Wessels	6	2	3
Q	(Brazil) Wilson Leite	4	5
Alt	(Romania) FC Jianu	6	7
WC	(Czech Republic) A Paulson	6	3	4
Q	(Hungary) M Valkusz	2	6	6
Q	(India) S Nagal	6	6
7	(Lebanon) B Hassan	1	3
4	(Sweden) DN Mădăraș	7^{7}	6
Q	(Poland) M Kaśnikowski	6^{3}	1
Alt	(Brazil) E Ribeiro	6	0	3
(Canada) S Diez	4	6	6
(Serbia) N Milojević	0^{r}
Q	(Italy) Alexander Weis	5
Q	(Poland) K Drzewiecki	5	0
6	(Argentina) RA Burruchaga	7	6

Second round
1	(Tunisia) A Dougaz	6	3	6
Alt	(Romania) FC Jianu	3	6	4
Q	(Hungary) M Valkusz	7	0	6
Q	(India) S Nagal	5	6	2
4	(Sweden) DN Mădăraș	6	3	6
(Canada) S Diez	3	6	3
Q	(Italy) A Weis	6	6
6	(Argentina) RA Burruchaga	4	0

Quarterfinals
1	(Tunisia) A Dougaz	1	1
Q	(Hungary) M Valkusz	6	6
4	(Sweden) DN Mădăraș	6	6
Q	(Italy) A Weis	3	3

Semifinals
Q	(Hungary) M Valkusz	6	7^{7}
4	(Sweden) DN Mădăraș	2	6^{3}

=== Bottom half ===
First round
5	(Argentina) F Comesaña	6	4
(Australia) J McCabe	1	0^{r}
WC	(Croatia) M Poljičak	4	2
(Italy) G Fonio	6	6
(Poland) K Żuk	1	1
(Netherlands) M Houkes	6	6
(United States) O Crawford	6	7^{9}
3	(Brazil) M Pucinelli de Almeida	3	6^{7}
8	(Serbia) M Zekić	1	0^{r}
(Bosnia and Herzegovina) N Fatić	6	0
(South Korea) G Campaña Lee	6	6
(Brazil) D Dutra da Silva	3	2
WC	(North Macedonia) K Ivanovski	4	1
Alt	(Croatia) D Prižmić	6	6
(Spain) M Landaluce	6^{5}	5
2	E Donskoy	7^{7}	7

Second round
5	(Argentina) F Comesaña	7^{8}	6
(Italy) G Fonio	6^{6}	2
(Netherlands) M Houkes	4	2
(United States) O Crawford	6	6
(Bosnia and Herzegovina) N Fatić	6^{1}	6	2
(South Korea) G Campaña Lee	7^{7}	4	6
Alt	(Croatia) D Prižmić	4	6	2
2	E Donskoy	6	3	6

Quarterfinals
5	(Argentina) F Comesaña	6	6
(United States) O Crawford	4	1
(South Korea) G Campaña Lee	4	2
2	E Donskoy	6	6

Semifinals
5	(Argentina) F Comesaña	6	6
2	E Donskoy	3	1
