= 2020 Moneta Czech Open =

- Date: 7–13 September
- Edition: 27th
- Draw: 32S / 16D
- Surface: Clay
- Location: Prostějov, Czech Republic
- Venue: TK Agrofert Prostějov

Champions

Singles
- (Poland) Kamil Majchrzak

Doubles
- (Czech Republic) Zdeněk Kolář / (Czech Republic) Lukáš Rosol
← 2019 ·	Moneta Czech Open	· 2021 →

The 2020 Moneta Czech Open was a professional tennis tournament played on clay courts. It was the 27th edition of the tournament which was part of the 2020 ATP Challenger Tour. It took place in Prostějov, Czech Republic between 7–13 September 2020.

== Singles main-draw entrants ==
=== Seeds ===
Country	Player	Rank^{1}	Seed
ESP	Pablo Andújar	56	1
CZE	Jiří Veselý	67	2
ITA	Stefano Travaglia	87	3
ESP	Jaume Munar	105	4
ESP	Pedro Martínez	106	5
POL	Kamil Majchrzak	107	6
JPN	Taro Daniel	112	7
RUS	Evgeny Donskoy	114	8

- ^{1} Rankings are as of 31 August 2020.

=== Other entrants ===
The following players received wildcards into the singles main draw:

- (Czech Republic) Zdeněk Kolář
- (Czech Republic) Jiří Lehečka
- (Czech Republic) Dalibor Svrčina

The following players received entry into the singles main draw as special exempts:

- (Netherlands) ~~Tallon Griekspoor~~
- (Russia) ~~Aslan Karatsev~~

The following players received entry from the qualifying draw:

- (Portugal) Frederico Ferreira Silva
- (Slovakia) Filip Horanský
- (Russia) Roman Safiullin
- (Australia) Aleksandar Vukic

The following players received entry as lucky losers:

- (Kazakhstan) Dmitry Popko
- (Czech Republic) Lukáš Rosol

== Champions ==
=== Singles ===
- (Poland) Kamil Majchrzak def. (Spain) Pablo Andújar 6–2, 7–6^{(7–5)}.

=== Doubles ===
- (Czech Republic) Zdeněk Kolář / (Czech Republic) Lukáš Rosol def. (India) Sriram Balaji / (India) Divij Sharan 6–2, 2–6, [10–6].
