= 2019 Moneta Czech Open – Doubles =

Doubles
- 2019 Moneta Czech Open

Final
- Champions: (Austria) Philipp Oswald (Slovakia) Filip Polášek
- Runners-up: (Czech Republic) Jiří Lehečka (Czech Republic) Jiří Veselý
- Score: 6–4, 7–6^{(7–4)}

Events
Singles	Doubles
← 2018 ·	Moneta Czech Open	· 2020 →

Denys Molchanov and Igor Zelenay were the defending champions but lost in the semifinals to Jiří Lehečka and Jiří Veselý.

Philipp Oswald and Filip Polášek won the title after defeating Lehečka and Veselý 6–4, 7–6^{(7–4)} in the final.

== Seeds ==
1. (El Salvador) Marcelo Arévalo / (Mexico) Miguel Ángel Reyes-Varela (semifinals)
2. (Ukraine) Denys Molchanov / (Slovakia) Igor Zelenay (semifinals)
3. (Czech Republic) Roman Jebavý / (United States) Nicholas Monroe (first round)
4. (Spain) Gerard Granollers / (Argentina) Andrés Molteni (first round)

== Draw ==
=== Key ===
- Q = Qualifier
- WC = Wild card
- LL = Lucky loser
- Alt = Alternate
- ITF = ITF entry
- PR = Protected ranking
- SR = Special ranking
- SE = Special exempt
- JE = Junior exempt
- JR = Junior Accelerator Programme entrant
- CO = College Accelerator Programme entrant
- NG = Next Gen Accelerator Program entrant
- w/o = Walkover
- r = Retired
- d = Defaulted

First round
1	(El Salvador) M Arévalo (Mexico) MÁ Reyes-Varela	6	6
WC	(Germany) A Begemann (Serbia) N Zimonjić	3	1
Alt	(Czech Republic) A Pavlásek (Czech Republic) V Šafránek	3	5
WC	(Czech Republic) M Gengel (Czech Republic) D Kellovský	6	7
3	(Czech Republic) R Jebavý (United States) N Monroe	5	3
(Austria) P Oswald (Slovakia) F Polášek	7	6
(Switzerland) L Margaroli (Austria) T-S Weissborn	6	6
(Colombia) DE Galán (Austria) L Miedler	4	3
ITF	(Zimbabwe) B Lock (Zimbabwe) CJ Lock	4	7	[10]
(Monaco) R Arneodo (Monaco) H Nys	6	5	[3]
WC	(Czech Republic) J Lehečka (Czech Republic) J Veselý	4	6	[10]
4	(Spain) G Granollers (Argentina) A Molteni	6	4	[0]
(Spain) G García López (Spain) D Marrero	7^{7}	6^{1}	[10]
ITF	(Italy) M Bortolotti (Australia) S Puodziunas	6^{4}	7^{7}	[12]
(Serbia) N Čačić (India) V Vardhan	2	6	[8]
2	(Ukraine) D Molchanov (Slovakia) I Zelenay	6	4	[10]

Quarterfinals
1	(El Salvador) M Arévalo (Mexico) MÁ Reyes-Varela	7	7
WC	(Czech Republic) M Gengel (Czech Republic) D Kellovský	5	5
(Austria) P Oswald (Slovakia) F Polášek	6	7^{7}
(Switzerland) L Margaroli (Austria) T-S Weissborn	3	6^{5}
ITF	(Zimbabwe) B Lock (Zimbabwe) CJ Lock	4	0
WC	(Czech Republic) J Lehečka (Czech Republic) J Veselý	6	6
ITF	(Italy) M Bortolotti (Australia) S Puodziunas	3	3
2	(Ukraine) D Molchanov (Slovakia) I Zelenay	6	6

Semifinals
1	(El Salvador) M Arévalo (Mexico) MÁ Reyes-Varela	4	4
(Austria) P Oswald (Slovakia) F Polášek	6	6
WC	(Czech Republic) J Lehečka (Czech Republic) J Veselý	4	6	[10]
2	(Ukraine) D Molchanov (Slovakia) I Zelenay	6	3	[4]

Final
(Austria) P Oswald (Slovakia) F Polášek	6	7^{7}
WC	(Czech Republic) J Lehečka (Czech Republic) J Veselý	4	6^{4}
