= 2023 Macedonian Open – Doubles =

Doubles
- 2023 Macedonian Open

Final
- Champions: (Czech Republic) Petr Nouza (Czech Republic) Andrew Paulson
- Runners-up: (India) Sriram Balaji (India) Jeevan Nedunchezhiyan
- Score: 7–6^{(7–5)}, 6–3

Events
| Singles | Doubles |
| Macedonian Open | · 2024 → |

This was the first edition of the tournament.

Petr Nouza and Andrew Paulson won the title after defeating Sriram Balaji and Jeevan Nedunchezhiyan 7–6^{(7–5)}, 6–3 in the final.

== Seeds ==
1. (India) Sriram Balaji / (India) Jeevan Nedunchezhiyan (final)
2. (Romania) Victor Vlad Cornea / (Venezuela) Luis David Martínez (first round)
3. (Netherlands) Sander Arends / (Poland) Szymon Walków (quarterfinals)
4. Ivan Liutarevich / (Ukraine) Vladyslav Manafov (quarterfinals)

== Draw ==
=== Key ===
- Q = Qualifier
- WC = Wild card
- LL = Lucky loser
- Alt = Alternate
- SE = Special exempt
- PR = Protected ranking
- ITF = ITF entry
- JE = Junior exempt
- w/o = Walkover
- r = Retired
- d = Defaulted
- SR = Special ranking

First round
1 | (India) S Balaji (India) J Nedunchezhiyan | 7^{7} | 5 | [10]
(United States) A Lawson (Greece) M Pervolarakis | 6^{5} | 7 | [8]
(Switzerland) L Margaroli (India) R Ramanathan | 3 | 5
(Poland) K Drzewiecki (Poland) K Żuk | 6 | 7
4 | I Liutarevich (Ukraine) V Manafov | 6 | 6^{3} | [10]
PR | (Uzbekistan) S Fayziev (Greece) M Kalovelonis | 2 | 7^{7} | [6]
WC | (North Macedonia) Obrad Markovski (North Macedonia) Gorazd Srbljak | 1 | 2
(Sweden) F Bergevi (Australia) J Taylor | 6 | 6
(Brazil) O Luz (Brazil) F Romboli | 6 | 7^{9}
(India) A Chandrasekar (India) VS Prashanth | 4 | 6^{7}
Alt | B Bobrov; E Donskoy | 1 | 7^{10} | [4]
3 | (Netherlands) S Arends (Poland) S Walków | 6 | 6^{8} | [10]
(India) P Raja (India) D Sharan | 6 | 1 | [7]
WC | (North Macedonia) Berk Bugarikj (North Macedonia) K Ivanovski | 4 | 6 | [10]
(Czech Republic) P Nouza (Czech Republic) A Paulson | 6^{1} | 6 | [13]
2 | (Romania) VV Cornea (Venezuela) LD Martínez | 7^{7} | 4 | [11]

Quarterfinals
1 | (India) S Balaji (India) J Nedunchezhiyan | 6 | 6
(Poland) K Drzewiecki (Poland) K Żuk | 3 | 4
4 | I Liutarevich (Ukraine) V Manafov | 4 | 6^{4}
(Sweden) F Bergevi (Australia) J Taylor | 6 | 7^{7}
(Brazil) O Luz (Brazil) F Romboli | 6 | 6
3 | (Netherlands) S Arends (Poland) S Walków | 4 | 4
WC | (North Macedonia) B Bugarikj (North Macedonia) K Ivanovski | 6^{5} | 4
(Czech Republic) P Nouza (Czech Republic) A Paulson | 7^{7} | 6

Semifinals
1 | (India) S Balaji (India) J Nedunchezhiyan | 6 | 6
(Sweden) F Bergevi (Australia) J Taylor | 3 | 4
(Brazil) O Luz (Brazil) F Romboli | 4 | 3
(Czech Republic) P Nouza (Czech Republic) A Paulson | 6 | 6

Final
1 | (India) S Balaji (India) J Nedunchezhiyan | 6^{5} | 3
(Czech Republic) P Nouza (Czech Republic) A Paulson | 7^{7} | 6
