= 2024 Macedonian Open – Doubles =

Doubles
- 2024 Macedonian Open

Final
- Champions: (United States) Ryan Seggerman (United States) Patrik Trhac
- Runners-up: (Czech Republic) Andrew Paulson (Czech Republic) Patrik Rikl
- Score: 6–3, 7–6^{(7–4)}

Events
Singles	Doubles
← 2023 ·	Macedonian Open	· 2025 →

Petr Nouza and Andrew Paulson were the defending champions but only Paulson chose to defend his title, partnering Patrik Rikl. They lost in the final to Ryan Seggerman and Patrik Trhac.

Seggerman and Trhac won the title after defeating Paulson and Rikl 6–3, 7–6^{(7–4)} in the final.

== Seeds ==
1. (Argentina) Guido Andreozzi / (Mexico) Miguel Ángel Reyes-Varela (quarterfinals)
2. (Venezuela) Luis David Martínez / (Colombia) Cristian Rodríguez (semifinals)
3. (India) Niki Kaliyanda Poonacha / (Brazil) Marcelo Zormann (first round)
4. (India) Anirudh Chandrasekar / (India) Arjun Kadhe (first round)

== Draw ==
=== Key ===
- Q = Qualifier
- WC = Wild card
- LL = Lucky loser
- Alt = Alternate
- ITF = ITF entry
- PR = Protected ranking
- SR = Special ranking
- SE = Special exempt
- JE = Junior exempt
- JR = Junior Accelerator Programme entrant
- CO = College Accelerator Programme entrant
- NG = Next Gen Accelerator Program entrant
- w/o = Walkover
- r = Retired
- d = Defaulted

=== Draw ===
First round
1	(Argentina) G Andreozzi (Mexico) MÁ Reyes-Varela	6	6
WC	(Italy) F Cinà (North Macedonia) Amar Huseinovic	1	3
(France) C Bittoun Kouzmine (Bulgaria) A Donski	6^{4}	4
(Italy) M Bortolotti (Netherlands) D Pel	7^{7}	6
3	(India) N Kaliyanda Poonacha (Brazil) M Zormann	6	1	[8]
(United States) R Seggerman (United States) P Trhac	3	6	[10]
(Ukraine) V Manafov (Finland) P Niklas-Salminen	5	6^{3}
(India) J Nedunchezhiyan (India) VS Prashanth	7	7^{7}
WC	(North Macedonia) Berk Bugarikj (North Macedonia) Dimitar Grabul	2	2
(United States) G Goldhoff (Romania) A Jecan	6	6
(Czech Republic) A Paulson (Czech Republic) P Rikl	7^{7}	6
4	(India) A Chandrasekar (India) A Kadhe	6^{3}	3
(Brazil) O Luz (Greece) Pe Tsitsipas	6	6
(Chinese Taipei) R Ho (Australia) C Puttergill	3	3
(Poland) K Drzewiecki (Poland) S Walków	6^{9}	6	[7]
2	(Venezuela) LD Martínez (Colombia) C Rodríguez	7^{11}	3	[10]

Quarterfinals
1	(Argentina) G Andreozzi (Mexico) MÁ Reyes-Varela	4	6	[8]
(Italy) M Bortolotti (Netherlands) D Pel	6	3	[10]
(United States) R Seggerman (United States) P Trhac	7	7^{7}
(India) J Nedunchezhiyan (India) VS Prashanth	5	6^{5}
(United States) G Goldhoff (Romania) A Jecan	4	3
(Czech Republic) A Paulson (Czech Republic) P Rikl	6	6
(Brazil) O Luz (Greece) Pe Tsitsipas	2	4
2	(Venezuela) LD Martínez (Colombia) C Rodríguez	6	6

Semifinals
(Italy) M Bortolotti (Netherlands) D Pel	5	6^{6}
(United States) R Seggerman (United States) P Trhac	7	7^{8}
(Czech Republic) A Paulson (Czech Republic) P Rikl	6	6
2	(Venezuela) LD Martínez (Colombia) C Rodríguez	4	3

Final
(United States) R Seggerman (United States) P Trhac	6	7^{7}
(Czech Republic) A Paulson (Czech Republic) P Rikl	3	6^{4}
