= 2024 Macedonian Open – Singles =

Singles
- 2024 Macedonian Open

Final
- Champion: (Austria) Joel Schwärzler
- Runner-up: (Poland) Kamil Majchrzak
- Score: 6–3, 6–3

Events
Singles	Doubles
- Macedonian Open

Máté Valkusz was the defending champion but chose not to defend his title.

Joel Schwärzler won the title after defeating Kamil Majchrzak 6–3, 6–3 in the final.

== Seeds ==
1. (Chinese Taipei) Tseng Chun-hsin (first round)
2. (Turkey) Ergi Kırkın (second round)
3. (Italy) Enrico Dalla Valle (withdrew)
4. (Bulgaria) Dimitar Kuzmanov (first round, retired)
5. (Poland) Maks Kaśnikowski (second round)
6. (Italy) Samuel Vincent Ruggeri (first round)
7. (Romania) Filip Cristian Jianu (second round)
8. (Belgium) Gauthier Onclin (first round)

== Draw ==
Key

- Q = Qualifier
- WC = Wild card
- LL = Lucky loser
- Alt = Alternate
- ITF = ITF entry
- PR = Protected ranking
- SR = Special ranking
- SE = Special exempt
- JE = Junior exempt
- JR = Junior Accelerator Programme entrant
- CO = College Accelerator Programme entrant
- NG = Next Gen Accelerator Program entrant
- w/o = Walkover
- r = Retired
- d = Defaulted

=== Finals ===
Semifinals
Alt	(Poland) Kamil Majchrzak	7^{7}	6^{6}	6
Q	(United States) Ryan Seggerman	6^{2}	7^{8}	2
(South Korea) Gerard Campaña Lee	7^{7}	3	2
(Austria) Joel Schwärzler	6^{4}	6	6

Final
Alt	(Poland) Kamil Majchrzak	3	3
(Austria) Joel Schwärzler	6	6

=== Top half ===
First round
1	(Chinese Taipei) C-h Tseng	2	4
PR	(Spain) N Álvarez Varona	6	6
Q	(Switzerland) J Nikles	6	6^{3}	4
(Italy) Alexander Weis	3	7^{7}	6
Q	(Georgia (country)) N Basilashvili	2	2
Alt	(Czech Republic) J Forejtek	6	6
Alt	(Poland) K Majchrzak	6	6
8	(Belgium) G Onclin	2	3
4	(Bulgaria) D Kuzmanov	0^{r}
Q	(United States) R Seggerman	1
Alt	(Croatia) M Dodig	7	3	6
(France) Alexis Gautier	5	6	4
Q	(Austria) N Oberleitner	6	7
WC	(Slovenia) B Artnak	4	5
(Brazil) O Luz	7^{7}	6^{9}	2^{r}
5	(Poland) M Kaśnikowski	6^{5}	7^{11}	4

Second round
PR	(Spain) N Álvarez Varona	6	4	2
(Italy) A Weis	4	6	6
Alt	(Czech Republic) J Forejtek	3	6	1
Alt	(Poland) K Majchrzak	6	3	6
Q	(United States) R Seggerman	0	7^{8}	6
Alt	(Croatia) M Dodig	6	6^{6}	2
Q	(Austria) N Oberleitner	6	7^{7}
5	(Poland) M Kaśnikowski	0	6^{3}

Quarterfinals
(Italy) A Weis	3	6^{5}
Alt	(Poland) K Majchrzak	6	7^{7}
Q	(United States) R Seggerman	2	7^{7}	7^{8}
Q	(Austria) N Oberleitner	6	6^{5}	6^{6}

Semifinals
Alt	(Poland) K Majchrzak	7^{7}	6^{6}	6
Q	(United States) R Seggerman	6^{2}	7^{8}	2

=== Bottom half ===
First round
7	(Romania) FC Jianu	6	6
(Italy) F Cinà	4	3
WC	(Bulgaria) A Lazarov	6^{5}	1
(Italy) M Cecchinato	7^{7}	6
(South Korea) G Campaña Lee	6	6^{4}	6
(United Kingdom) J Clarke	1	7^{7}	3
(Italy) G Fonio	6	6
LL	(Netherlands) Ryan Nijboer	2	1
6	(Italy) Samuel Vincent Ruggeri	6^{7}	1
WC	(Bosnia and Herzegovina) M Bašić	7^{9}	6
(Czech Republic) A Paulson	6	7^{7}
(Czech Republic) J Veselý	4	6^{5}
(Austria) J Schwärzler	5	7	3
Q	(Uzbekistan) S Fomin	7	5	0^{r}
Q	(Croatia) L Mikrut	4	6^{8}
2	(Turkey) E Kırkın	6	7^{10}

Second round
7	(Romania) FC Jianu	3	2
(Italy) M Cecchinato	6	6
(South Korea) G Campaña Lee	6	6
(Italy) G Fonio	1	2
WC	(Bosnia and Herzegovina) M Bašić	4	3
(Czech Republic) A Paulson	6	6
(Austria) J Schwärzler	6	6
2	(Turkey) E Kırkın	2	1

Quarterfinals
(Italy) M Cecchinato	4	2
(South Korea) G Campaña Lee	6	6
(Czech Republic) A Paulson	6	4	4
(Austria) J Schwärzler	3	6	6

Semifinals
(South Korea) G Campaña Lee	7^{7}	3	2
(Austria) J Schwärzler	6^{4}	6	6
