= 2025 Macedonian Open – Doubles =

Doubles
- 2025 Macedonian Open

Final
- Champions: (Czech Republic) Andrew Paulson (Czech Republic) Michael Vrbenský
- Runners-up: (India) Sriram Balaji (Mexico) Miguel Ángel Reyes-Varela
- Score: 2–6, 6–4, [10–6]

Events
Singles	Doubles
← 2024 ·	Macedonian Open	· 2026 →

Ryan Seggerman and Patrik Trhac were the defending champions but chose to defend their title with different partners. Seggerman partnered Cleeve Harper but lost in the quarterfinals to Andrew Paulson and Michael Vrbenský. Trhac partnered Mac Kiger but lost in the first round to Paulson and Vrbenský.

Paulson and Vrbenský won the title after defeating Sriram Balaji and Miguel Ángel Reyes-Varela 2–6, 6–4, [10–6] in the final.

== Seeds ==
1. (India) Sriram Balaji / (Mexico) Miguel Ángel Reyes-Varela (final)
2. (Canada) Cleeve Harper / (United States) Ryan Seggerman (quarterfinals)
3. (India) Rithvik Choudary Bollipalli / (India) Vijay Sundar Prashanth (semifinals)
4. (Brazil) Marcelo Demoliner / (Brazil) Marcelo Zormann (semifinals)

== Draw ==
=== Key ===
- Q = Qualifier
- WC = Wild card
- LL = Lucky loser
- Alt = Alternate
- ITF = ITF entry
- PR = Protected ranking
- SR = Special ranking
- SE = Special exempt
- JE = Junior exempt
- JR = Junior Accelerator Programme entrant
- CO = College Accelerator Programme entrant
- NG = Next Gen Accelerator Program entrant
- w/o = Walkover
- r = Retired
- d = Defaulted

=== Draw ===
First round
1	(India) S Balaji (Mexico) M Reyes-Varela	6	7^{8}
WC	(North Macedonia) Amar Huseinovic (Serbia) S Latinović	2	6^{6}
(Bulgaria) A Donski (Spain) S Martos Gornés	7^{7}	6
(United States) G Goldhoff (United States) T Hilderbrand	6^{3}	3
4	(Brazil) M Demoliner (Brazil) M Zormann	7	6
(Peru) A Merino (Germany) C Negritu	5	4
(Romania) A Jecan (Italy) G Ricca	6^{5}	4
(Israel) D Cukierman (Belgium) M Geerts	7^{7}	6
(Spain) Í Cervantes (Venezuela) LD Martínez	6	3	[6]
(Austria) N Oberleitner (Austria) D Pichler	3	6	[10]
WC	(North Macedonia) Berk Bugarikj (North Macedonia) K Ivanovski	6	3	[8]
3	(India) RC Bollipalli (India) VS Prashanth	4	6	[10]
PR	(Czech Republic) A Paulson (Czech Republic) M Vrbenský	7^{7}	4	[10]
(United States) M Kiger (United States) P Trhac	6^{5}	6	[7]
(Italy) M Bortolotti (Colombia) C Rodríguez	4	3
2	(Canada) C Harper (United States) R Seggerman	6	6

Quarterfinals
1	(India) S Balaji (Mexico) M Reyes-Varela	7^{11}	7
(Bulgaria) A Donski (Spain) S Martos Gornés	6^{9}	5
4	(Brazil) M Demoliner (Brazil) M Zormann	6^{3}	6	[10]
(Israel) D Cukierman (Belgium) M Geerts	7^{7}	2	[6]
(Austria) N Oberleitner (Austria) D Pichler	7^{7}	5	[8]
3	(India) RC Bollipalli (India) VS Prashanth	6^{4}	7	[10]
PR	(Czech Republic) A Paulson (Czech Republic) M Vrbenský	6^{1}	6	[10]
2	(Canada) C Harper (United States) R Seggerman	7^{7}	3	[5]

Semifinals
1	(India) S Balaji (Mexico) M Reyes-Varela	7	6
4	(Brazil) M Demoliner (Brazil) M Zormann	5	3
3	(India) RC Bollipalli (India) VS Prashanth	3	3
PR	(Czech Republic) A Paulson (Czech Republic) M Vrbenský	6	6

Final
1	(India) S Balaji (Mexico) M Reyes-Varela	6	4	[6]
PR	(Czech Republic) A Paulson (Czech Republic) M Vrbenský	2	6	[10]
