= 2023 Macedonian Open =

- Date: 22–27 May
- Edition: 1st
- Surface: Clay
- Location: Skopje, North Macedonia

Champions

Singles
- (Hungary) Máté Valkusz

Doubles
- (Czech Republic) Petr Nouza / (Czech Republic) Andrew Paulson
Macedonian Open	· 2024 →

The 2023 Macedonian Open was a professional tennis tournament played on clay courts. It was the 1st edition of the tournament which was part of the 2023 ATP Challenger Tour. It took place in Skopje, North Macedonia between 22 and 27 May 2023.

== Singles main-draw entrants ==
=== Seeds ===
Country	Player	Rank^{1}	Seed
TUN	Aziz Dougaz	232	1
	Evgeny Donskoy	242	2
BRA	Matheus Pucinelli de Almeida	246	3
SWE	Dragoș Nicolae Mădăraș	248	4
ARG	Francisco Comesaña	252	5
ARG	Román Andrés Burruchaga	253	6
LIB	Benjamin Hassan	261	7
SRB	Miljan Zekić	266	8

- ^{1} Rankings are as of 8 May 2023.

=== Other entrants ===
The following players received wildcards into the singles main draw:

- (North Macedonia) Kalin Ivanovski
- (Czech Republic) Andrew Paulson
- (Croatia) Mili Poljičak

The following players received entry into the singles main draw as alternates:

- (Romania) Filip Cristian Jianu
- (Croatia) Dino Prižmić
- (Brazil) Eduardo Ribeiro

The following players received entry from the qualifying draw:

- (Poland) Karol Drzewiecki
- (Poland) Maks Kaśnikowski
- (Brazil) Wilson Leite
- (India) Sumit Nagal
- (Hungary) Máté Valkusz
- (Italy) Alexander Weis

== Champions ==
=== Singles ===
- (Hungary) Máté Valkusz def. (Argentina) Francisco Comesaña 6–3, 6–4.

=== Doubles ===
- (Czech Republic) Petr Nouza / (Czech Republic) Andrew Paulson def. (India) Sriram Balaji / (India) Jeevan Nedunchezhiyan 7–6^{(7–5)}, 6–3.
