= 2020 Moneta Czech Open – Singles =

Singles
- 2020 Moneta Czech Open

Final
- Champion: (Poland) Kamil Majchrzak
- Runner-up: (Spain) Pablo Andújar
- Score: 6–2, 7–6^{(7–5)}

Events
Singles	Doubles
← 2019 ·	Moneta Czech Open	· 2021 →

Pablo Andújar was the defending champion but lost in the final to Kamil Majchrzak.

Majchrzak won the title after defeating Andújar 6–2, 7–6^{(7–5)} in the final.

== Seeds ==
1. (Spain) Pablo Andújar (final)
2. (Czech Republic) Jiří Veselý (second round)
3. (Italy) Stefano Travaglia (semifinals)
4. (Spain) Jaume Munar (first round)
5. (Spain) Pedro Martínez (second round)
6. (Poland) Kamil Majchrzak (champion)
7. (Japan) Taro Daniel (second round)
8. (Russia) Evgeny Donskoy (first round)

== Draw ==
=== Key ===
- Q = Qualifier
- WC = Wild card
- LL = Lucky loser
- Alt = Alternate
- SE = Special exempt
- PR = Protected ranking
- ITF = ITF entry
- JE = Junior exempt
- w/o = Walkover
- r = Retired
- d = Defaulted
- SR = Special ranking

=== Finals ===
Semifinals
1	(Spain) Pablo Andújar	6	6
3	(Italy) Stefano Travaglia	0	3
WC	(Czech Republic) Jiří Lehečka	6	1	2
6	(Poland) Kamil Majchrzak	4	6	6

Final
1	(Spain) Pablo Andújar	2	6^{5}
6	(Poland) Kamil Majchrzak	6	7^{7}

=== Top half ===
First round
1	(Spain) P Andújar	6	6
WC	(Czech Republic) Z Kolář	4	3
(Colombia) DE Galán	6	3	4
(Italy) L Giustino	2	6	6
(Slovakia) J Kovalík	7^{7}	6
(South Korea) Hy Chung	6^{5}	2
(Germany) C-M Stebe	5	6	6
8	(Russia) E Donskoy	7	2	2
3	(Italy) S Travaglia	3	6	6
WC	(Czech Republic) D Svrčina	6	1	1
(Germany) Y Maden	6	4	1
LL	(Kazakhstan) D Popko	3	6	6
(Australia) A Bolt	3	3
(Slovakia) M Kližan	6	6
(Canada) S Diez	2	4
5	(Spain) P Martínez	6	6

Second round
1	(Spain) P Andújar	6	3
(Italy) L Giustino	0	0^{r}
(Slovakia) J Kovalík	6	2	6
(Germany) C-M Stebe	1	6	2
3	(Italy) S Travaglia	7^{7}	6
LL	(Kazakhstan) D Popko	6^{5}	4
(Slovakia) M Kližan	1	7^{8}	6
5	(Spain) P Martínez	6	6^{6}	1

Quarterfinals
1	(Spain) P Andújar	6	7^{7}
(Slovakia) J Kovalík	2	6^{3}
3	(Italy) S Travaglia	3	6	6
(Slovakia) M Kližan	6	2	1

Semifinals
1	(Spain) P Andújar	6	6
3	(Italy) S Travaglia	0	3

=== Bottom half ===
First round
7	(Japan) T Daniel	4	6	6
(Argentina) F Bagnis	6	4	3
LL	(Czech Republic) L Rosol	4	3
Q	(Slovakia) F Horanský	6	6
Q	(Portugal) F Ferreira Silva	6^{5}	6	5
WC	(Czech Republic) J Lehečka	7^{7}	4	7
(Serbia) N Milojević	6	6
4	(Spain) J Munar	4	3
6	(Poland) K Majchrzak	6	6
Q	(Russia) R Safiullin	4	4
(Belgium) K Coppejans	1	4
(Australia) M Polmans	6	6
(Switzerland) H Laaksonen	4	3
Q	(Australia) A Vukic	6	6
(Belarus) I Ivashka	2	3
2	(Czech Republic) J Veselý	6	6

Second round
7	(Japan) T Daniel	3	4
Q	(Slovakia) F Horanský	6	6
WC	(Czech Republic) J Lehečka	7^{7}	6
(Serbia) N Milojević	6^{4}	3
6	(Poland) K Majchrzak	6	6
(Australia) M Polmans	3	2
Q	(Australia) A Vukic	7^{7}	6
2	(Czech Republic) J Veselý	6^{4}	3

Quarterfinals
Q	(Slovakia) F Horanský	1	1
WC	(Czech Republic) J Lehečka	6	6
6	(Poland) K Majchrzak	6	6
Q	(Australia) A Vukic	4	1

Semifinals
WC	(Czech Republic) J Lehečka	6	1	2
6	(Poland) K Majchrzak	4	6	6
