= 2015 Australian Open – Boys' doubles =

Boys' doubles
- 2015 Australian Open

Final
- Champions: (Australia) Jake Delaney (Australia) Marc Polmans
- Runners-up: (Poland) Hubert Hurkacz (Slovakia) Alex Molčan
- Score: 0–6, 6–2, [10–8]

Events
Singles	men	women		boys	girls
Doubles	men	women	mixed	boys	girls
WC Singles	men	women	quad
WC Doubles	men	women	quad
Legends	men	women	mixed
- Australian Open

Jake Delaney and Marc Polmans won the title, defeating Hubert Hurkacz and Alex Molčan in the final, 0–6, 6–2, [10–8].

Lucas Miedler and Bradley Mousley were the defending champions, but both players were no longer eligible to compete in junior tournaments.

== Seeds ==
1. (South Korea) Chung Yun-seong / (South Korea) Hong Seong-chan (first round)
2. (United States) William Blumberg / (Brazil) Orlando Luz (quarterfinals)
3. (Serbia) Miomir Kecmanović / (United States) Michael Mmoh (semifinals)
4. (France) Corentin Denolly / (Switzerland) Johan Nikles (second round)
5. (Australia) Akira Santillan / (Netherlands) Tim van Rijthoven (quarterfinals)
6. (Japan) Sora Fukuda / (Sweden) Mikael Ymer (second round)
7. (South Africa) Lloyd Harris / (Peru) Juan José Rosas (second round)
8. (Poland) Hubert Hurkacz / (Slovakia) Alex Molčan (final)

== Draw ==
Key

- Q = Qualifier
- WC = Wild card
- LL = Lucky loser
- Alt = Alternate
- ITF = ITF entry
- PR = Protected ranking
- SR = Special ranking
- SE = Special exempt
- JE = Junior exempt
- JR = Junior Accelerator Programme entrant
- CO = College Accelerator Programme entrant
- NG = Next Gen Accelerator Program entrant
- w/o = Walkover
- r = Retired
- d = Defaulted

=== Finals ===
Semifinals
(Australia) Jake Delaney (Australia) Marc Polmans	2	6	[11]
(Hungary) Máté Valkusz (Germany) Louis Wessels	6	1	[9]
3	(Serbia) Miomir Kecmanović (United States) Michael Mmoh	7^{11}	6^{0}	[2]
8	(Poland) Hubert Hurkacz (Slovakia) Alex Molčan	6^{9}	7^{7}	[10]

Final
(Australia) Jake Delaney (Australia) Marc Polmans	0	6	[10]
8	(Poland) Hubert Hurkacz (Slovakia) Alex Molčan	6	2	[8]

=== Top half ===
First round
1	(South Korea) Chung Yun-seong (South Korea) Hong Seong-chan	3	6	[6]
(Australia) Jake Delaney (Australia) Marc Polmans	6	2	[10]
(Russia) Bogdan Bobrov (Tunisia) Aziz Dougaz	2	5
(Chinese Taipei) Lo Chien-hsun (Japan) Yosuke Watanuki	6	7
(Georgia (country)) Aleksandre Bakshi (Greece) Stefanos Tsitsipas	7^{7}	6
(Croatia) Domagoj Bilješko (Denmark) Benjamin Hannestad	6^{3}	2
(France) Corentin Moutet (France) Mandresy Rakotomalala	4	6	[5]
5	(Australia) Akira Santillan (Netherlands) Tim van Rijthoven	6	3	[10]
4	(France) Corentin Denolly (Switzerland) Johan Nikles	7	5	[10]
(Germany) Fabian Fallert (Germany) Tim Sandkaulen	5	7	[7]
(Hungary) Máté Valkusz (Germany) Louis Wessels	3	6	[10]
WC	(Australia) Alex de Minaur (Australia) Blake Ellis	6	4	[4]
(Norway) Viktor Durasovic (India) Sumit Nagal	1	6^{3}
(Japan) Renta Tukuda (Japan) Jumpei Yamasaki	6	7^{7}
(New Zealand) William Matheson (South Korea) Oh Chan-yeong	4	6	[6]
6	(Japan) Sora Fukuda (Sweden) Mikael Ymer	6	4	[10]

Second round
(Australia) J Delaney (Australia) M Polmans	6^{5}	6	[10]
(Chinese Taipei) C-h Lo (Japan) Y Watanuki	7^{7}	3	[1]
(Georgia (country)) A Bakshi (Greece) S Tsitsipas	3	4
5	(Australia) A Santillan (Netherlands) T van Rijthoven	6	6
4	(France) C Denolly (Switzerland) J Nikles	6^{4}	3
(Hungary) M Valkusz (Germany) L Wessels	7^{7}	6
(Japan) R Tukuda (Japan) J Yamasaki	7^{7}	3	[10]
6	(Japan) S Fukuda (Sweden) M Ymer	6^{5}	6	[7]

Quarterfinals
(Australia) J Delaney (Australia) M Polmans	6	6
5	(Australia) A Santillan (Netherlands) T van Rijthoven	1	0
(Hungary) M Valkusz (Germany) L Wessels	7^{7}	6
(Japan) R Tukuda (Japan) J Yamasaki	6^{2}	2

Semifinals
(Australia) J Delaney (Australia) M Polmans	2	6	[11]
(Hungary) M Valkusz (Germany) L Wessels	6	1	[9]

=== Bottom half ===
First round
7	(South Africa) Lloyd Harris (Peru) Juan José Rosas	3	7	[10]
(Vietnam) Lý Hoàng Nam (Denmark) Christian Sigsgaard	6	5	[8]
WC	(Australia) Daniel Hobart (Australia) Daniel Nolan	4	1
(Japan) Yuya Ito (Japan) Yusuke Takahashi	6	6
(Switzerland) Marko Osmakcic (Italy) Andrea Pellegrino	2	4
(Uzbekistan) Jurabek Karimov (Chinese Taipei) Wu Tung-lin	6	6
(Russia) Alexander Bublik (Russia) Boris Pokotilov	1	6	[8]
3	(Serbia) Miomir Kecmanović (United States) Michael Mmoh	6	4	[10]
8	(Poland) Hubert Hurkacz (Slovakia) Alex Molčan	6	6
(United States) Sameer Kumar (Canada) Denis Shapovalov	4	4
(Spain) Eduard Güell Bartrina (Spain) Álvaro López San Martín	0	6^{4}
WC	(Australia) Mitchell Harper (Australia) Jack Jaede	6	7^{7}
(South Korea) Kwon Soon-woo (South Korea) Lee Duck-hee	6^{5}	6	[8]
(China) Te Rigele (China) Wu Yibing	7^{7}	3	[10]
Alt	(India) Vasisht Cheruku (South Africa) Brandon Laubser	6^{3}	2
2	(United States) William Blumberg (Brazil) Orlando Luz	7^{7}	6

Second round
7	(South Africa) L Harris (Peru) JJ Rosas	6	6^{10}	[8]
(Japan) Y Ito (Japan) Y Takahashi	1	7^{12}	[10]
(Uzbekistan) J Karimov (Chinese Taipei) T-l Wu	3	4
3	(Serbia) M Kecmanović (United States) M Mmoh	6	6
8	(Poland) H Hurkacz (Slovakia) A Molčan	6	4	[10]
WC	(Australia) M Harper (Australia) J Jaede	2	6	[6]
(China) R Te (China) Y Wu	2	4
2	(United States) W Blumberg (Brazil) O Luz	6	6

Quarterfinals
(Japan) Y Ito (Japan) Y Takahashi	2	2
3	(Serbia) M Kecmanović (United States) M Mmoh	6	6
8	(Poland) H Hurkacz (Slovakia) A Molčan	6	7^{7}
2	(United States) W Blumberg (Brazil) O Luz	2	6^{2}

Semifinals
3	(Serbia) M Kecmanović (United States) M Mmoh	7^{11}	6^{0}	[2]
8	(Poland) H Hurkacz (Slovakia) A Molčan	6^{9}	7^{7}	[10]
