= 2024 Macedonian Open =

- Date: 20–25 May
- Edition: 2nd
- Surface: Clay
- Location: Skopje, North Macedonia

Champions

Singles
- (Austria) Joel Schwärzler

Doubles
- (United States) Ryan Seggerman / (United States) Patrik Trhac
← 2023 ·	Macedonian Open	· 2025 →

The 2024 Macedonian Open was a professional tennis tournament played on clay courts. It was the second edition of the tournament which was part of the 2024 ATP Challenger Tour. It took place in Skopje, North Macedonia between 20 and 25 May 2024.

== Singles main-draw entrants ==
=== Seeds ===
Country	Player	Rank^{1}	Seed
TPE	Tseng Chun-hsin	248	1
TUR	Ergi Kırkın	251	2
~~ITA~~	~~Enrico Dalla Valle~~	~~255~~	~~3~~
BUL	Dimitar Kuzmanov	260	4
POL	Maks Kaśnikowski	268	5
ITA	Samuel Vincent Ruggeri	276	6
ROU	Filip Cristian Jianu	278	7
BEL	Gauthier Onclin	282	8

- ^{1} Rankings are as of 6 May 2024.

=== Other entrants ===
The following players received wildcards into the singles main draw:

- (Slovenia) Bor Artnak
- (Bosnia and Herzegovina) Mirza Bašić
- (Bulgaria) Alexandar Lazarov

The following player received entry into the singles main draw using a protected ranking:

- (Spain) Nicolás Álvarez Varona

The following players received entry into the singles main draw as alternates:

- (Croatia) Matej Dodig
- (Czech Republic) Jonáš Forejtek
- (Poland) Kamil Majchrzak

The following players received entry from the qualifying draw:

- (Georgia (country)) Nikoloz Basilashvili
- (Uzbekistan) Sergey Fomin
- (Croatia) Luka Mikrut
- (Switzerland) Johan Nikles
- (Austria) Neil Oberleitner
- (United States) Ryan Seggerman

The following player received entry as a lucky loser:

- (Netherlands) Ryan Nijboer

== Champions ==
=== Singles ===
- (Austria) Joel Schwärzler def. (Poland) Kamil Majchrzak 6–3, 6–3.

=== Doubles ===
- (United States) Ryan Seggerman / (United States) Patrik Trhac def. (Czech Republic) Andrew Paulson / (Czech Republic) Patrik Rikl 6–3, 7–6^{(7–4)}.
