= 2019 Moneta Czech Open – Singles =

Singles
- 2019 Moneta Czech Open

Final
- Champion: (Spain) Pablo Andújar
- Runner-up: (Hungary) Attila Balázs
- Score: 6–2, 7–5

Events
Singles	Doubles
- Moneta Czech Open

Jaume Munar was the defending champion but chose not to defend his title.

Pablo Andújar won the title after defeating Attila Balázs 6–2, 7–5 in the final.

== Seeds ==
All seeds receive a bye into the second round.

1. (Norway) Casper Ruud (semifinals)
2. (Spain) Albert Ramos Viñolas (second round)
3. (Spain) Pablo Andújar (champion)
4. (Czech Republic) Jiří Veselý (second round)
5. (Slovakia) Jozef Kovalík (third round)
6. (Spain) Guillermo García López (third round)
7. (Czech Republic) Lukáš Rosol (second round)
8. (Belgium) Arthur De Greef (second round)
9. (Colombia) Daniel Elahi Galán (third round)
10. (Italy) Federico Gaio (quarterfinals)
11. (Hungary) Attila Balázs (final)
12. (Netherlands) Thiemo de Bakker (second round)
13. (Egypt) Mohamed Safwat (third round)
14. (Austria) Lucas Miedler (second round)
15. (Spain) Bernabé Zapata Miralles (quarterfinals)
16. (Belgium) Steve Darcis (second round)

== Draw ==
Key

- Q = Qualifier
- WC = Wild card
- LL = Lucky loser
- Alt = Alternate
- ITF = ITF entry
- PR = Protected ranking
- SR = Special ranking
- SE = Special exempt
- JE = Junior exempt
- JR = Junior Accelerator Programme entrant
- CO = College Accelerator Programme entrant
- NG = Next Gen Accelerator Program entrant
- w/o = Walkover
- r = Retired
- d = Defaulted

=== Finals ===
Quarterfinals
1	(Norway) Casper Ruud	6	1	6
10	(Italy) Federico Gaio	3	6	4
3	(Spain) Pablo Andújar	6	6
(Germany) Benjamin Hassan	0	2
11	(Hungary) Attila Balázs	6	5	6
15	(Spain) Bernabé Zapata Miralles	4	7	4
(El Salvador) Marcelo Arévalo	3	7^{7}	6^{3}
ITF	(Germany) Peter Torebko	6	6^{2}	7^{7}

Semifinals
1	(Norway) Casper Ruud	2	4
3	(Spain) Pablo Andújar	6	6
11	(Hungary) Attila Balázs	6	6
ITF	(Germany) Peter Torebko	1	4

Final
3	(Spain) Pablo Andújar	6	7
11	(Hungary) Attila Balázs	2	5

=== Top half ===
==== Section 1 ====
First round
(Brazil) P Sakamoto	6^{5}	2
ITF	(France) C Denolly	7^{7}	6
(Czech Republic) V Šafránek	6	3	6
Q	(Czech Republic) R Jebavý	1	6	4
WC	(Czech Republic) Marek Jaloviec	2	2
Q	(Czech Republic) Pavel Nejedlý	6	6
(Serbia) D Petrović	4	4
ITF	(France) A Rinderknech	6	6

Second round
1	(Norway) C Ruud	4	6	6
ITF	(France) C Denolly	6	3	2
(Czech Republic) V Šafránek	6	6
14	(Austria) L Miedler	2	3
10	(Italy) F Gaio	6	6
Q	(Czech Republic) P Nejedlý	0	4
ITF	(France) A Rinderknech	5	2
5	(Slovakia) J Kovalík	7	6

Third round
1	(Norway) C Ruud	6	6
(Czech Republic) V Šafránek	1	1
10	(Italy) F Gaio	6	6
5	(Slovakia) J Kovalík	0	4

Quarterfinals
1	(Norway) C Ruud	6	1	6
10	(Italy) F Gaio	3	6	4

==== Section 2 ====
First round
(France) TK Wang	6	6
WC	(Czech Republic) D Siniakov	4	1
(Slovakia) A Molčan	6	6
Alt	(Czech Republic) D Poljak	2	1
(Czech Republic) J Šátral	2	6	1
WC	(Czech Republic) J Lehečka	6	4	6
(Germany) B Hassan	6^{4}	6	6
Alt	(Italy) M Bortolotti	7^{7}	0	2

Second round
3	(Spain) P Andújar	6	6
(France) TK Wang	0	1
(Slovakia) A Molčan	7^{7}	1	4
13	(Egypt) M Safwat	6^{5}	6	6
9	(Colombia) DE Galán	6	7^{8}
WC	(Czech Republic) J Lehečka	0	6^{6}
(Germany) B Hassan	7^{7}	4	6
7	(Czech Republic) L Rosol	6^{4}	6	1

Third round
3	(Spain) P Andújar	6	6
13	(Egypt) M Safwat	4	3
9	(Colombia) DE Galán	4	6	2
(Germany) B Hassan	6	3	6

Quarterfinals
3	(Spain) P Andújar	6	6
(Germany) B Hassan	0	2

=== Bottom half ===
==== Section 3 ====
First round
Alt	(Zimbabwe) B Lock	6	2	3
(Germany) J Härteis	2	6	6
Alt	(Israel) B Patael	6	2	2
(Belarus) U Ignatik	4	6	6
(France) K de Schepper	3	4
(Monaco) H Nys	6	6
(Romania) D Dima	6	3	5
ITF	(Switzerland) S Ehrat	3	6	7

Second round
8	(Belgium) A De Greef	4	4
(Germany) J Härteis	6	6
(Belarus) U Ignatik	7	3	4
11	(Hungary) A Balázs	5	6	6
15	(Spain) B Zapata Miralles	6	6
(Monaco) H Nys	2	4
ITF	(Switzerland) S Ehrat	3	6	6
4	(Czech Republic) J Veselý	6	3	4

Third round
(Germany) J Härteis
11	(Hungary) A Balázs	w/o
15	(Spain) B Zapata Miralles	6	7^{7}
ITF	(Switzerland) S Ehrat	1	6^{5}

Quarterfinals
11	(Hungary) A Balázs	6	5	6
15	(Spain) B Zapata Miralles	4	7	4

==== Section 4 ====
First round
ITF	(Egypt) K-M Maamoun	6	7^{7}
(Czech Republic) A Pavlásek	4	6^{0}
Alt	(Italy) E Dalla Valle	6^{5}	2
(El Salvador) M Arévalo	7^{7}	6
WC	(Czech Republic) J Pospíšil	3	1
WC	(Czech Republic) V Kopřiva	6	6
ITF	(Germany) P Torebko	6	6
(France) S Robert	4	3

Second round
6	(Spain) G García López	6	6
ITF	(Egypt) K-M Maamoun	4	2
(El Salvador) M Arévalo	7	6
12	(Netherlands) T de Bakker	5	4
16	(Belgium) S Darcis	7^{7}	3	4
WC	(Czech Republic) V Kopřiva	6^{5}	6	6
ITF	(Germany) P Torebko	6	5	7
2	(Spain) A Ramos Viñolas	4	7	5

Third round
6	(Spain) G García López	3	6	1
(El Salvador) M Arévalo	6	4	6
WC	(Czech Republic) V Kopřiva	6	4	4
ITF	(Germany) P Torebko	4	6	6

Quarterfinals
(El Salvador) M Arévalo	3	7^{7}	6^{3}
ITF	(Germany) P Torebko	6	6^{2}	7^{7}
