= 2019 Moneta Czech Open =

- Date: 3–9 June
- Edition: 26th
- Draw: 48S / 16D
- Surface: Clay
- Location: Prostějov, Czech Republic
- Venue: TK Agrofert Prostějov

Champions

Singles
- (Spain) Pablo Andújar

Doubles
- (Austria) Philipp Oswald / (Slovakia) Filip Polášek
- Moneta Czech Open

The 2019 Moneta Czech Open was a professional tennis tournament played on clay courts. It was the 26th edition of the tournament which was part of the 2019 ATP Challenger Tour. It took place in Prostějov, Czech Republic between 3–9 June 2019.

== Singles main-draw entrants ==
=== Seeds ===
Country	Player	Rank^{1}	Seed
NOR	Casper Ruud	63	1
ESP	Albert Ramos Viñolas	87	2
ESP	Pablo Andújar	93	3
CZE	Jiří Veselý	105	4
SVK	Jozef Kovalík	132	5
ESP	Guillermo García López	136	6
CZE	Lukáš Rosol	149	7
BEL	Arthur De Greef	181	8
COL	Daniel Elahi Galán	197	9
ITA	Federico Gaio	202	10
HUN	Attila Balázs	222	11
NED	Thiemo de Bakker	229	12
EGY	Mohamed Safwat	231	13
AUT	Lucas Miedler	238	14
ESP	Bernabé Zapata Miralles	244	15
BEL	Steve Darcis	245	16

- ^{1} Rankings are as of 27 May 2019.

=== Other entrants ===
The following players received wildcards into the singles main draw:

- (Czech Republic) Marek Jaloviec
- (Czech Republic) Vít Kopřiva
- (Czech Republic) Jiří Lehečka
- (Czech Republic) Jaroslav Pospíšil
- (Czech Republic) Daniel Siniakov

The following players received entry into the singles main draw as alternates:

- (Italy) Marco Bortolotti
- (Italy) Enrico Dalla Valle
- (Zimbabwe) Benjamin Lock
- (Israel) Ben Patael
- (Czech Republic) David Poljak

The following players received entry into the singles main draw using their ITF World Tennis Ranking:

- (France) Corentin Denolly
- (Switzerland) Sandro Ehrat
- (Egypt) Karim-Mohamed Maamoun
- (France) Arthur Rinderknech
- (Germany) Peter Torebko

The following players received entry from the qualifying draw:

- (Czech Republic) Roman Jebavý
- (Czech Republic) Pavel Nejedlý

== Champions ==
=== Singles ===
- (Spain) Pablo Andújar def. (Hungary) Attila Balázs 6–2, 7–5.

=== Doubles ===
- (Austria) Philipp Oswald / (Slovakia) Filip Polášek def. (Czech Republic) Jiří Lehečka / (Czech Republic) Jiří Veselý 6–4, 7–6^{(7–4)}.
