= 2020 Moneta Czech Open – Doubles =

Doubles
- 2020 Moneta Czech Open

Final
- Champions: (Czech Republic) Zdeněk Kolář (Czech Republic) Lukáš Rosol
- Runners-up: (India) Sriram Balaji (India) Divij Sharan
- Score: 6–2, 2–6, [10–6]

Events
Singles	Doubles
- Moneta Czech Open

Philipp Oswald and Filip Polášek were the defending champions but chose not to defend their title.

Zdeněk Kolář and Lukáš Rosol won the title after defeating Sriram Balaji and Divij Sharan 6–2, 2–6, [10–6] in the final.

== Seeds ==
1. (Denmark) Frederik Nielsen / (Germany) Tim Pütz (first round)
2. (Israel) Jonathan Erlich / (Belarus) Andrei Vasilevski (quarterfinals)
3. (Sweden) André Göransson / (Portugal) Gonçalo Oliveira (quarterfinals)
4. (Netherlands) Sander Arends / (Netherlands) David Pel (semifinals)

== Draw ==
Key

- Q = Qualifier
- WC = Wild card
- LL = Lucky loser
- Alt = Alternate
- ITF = ITF entry
- PR = Protected ranking
- SR = Special ranking
- SE = Special exempt
- JE = Junior exempt
- JR = Junior Accelerator Programme entrant
- CO = College Accelerator Programme entrant
- NG = Next Gen Accelerator Program entrant
- w/o = Walkover
- r = Retired
- d = Defaulted

First round
1	(Denmark) F Nielsen (Germany) T Pütz	4	4
(Bosnia and Herzegovina) T Brkić (Switzerland) L Margaroli	6	6
WC	(Czech Republic) D Poljak (Czech Republic) D Svrčina	6^{3}	6	[10]
WC	(Czech Republic) D Kellovský (Czech Republic) J Lehečka	7^{7}	2	[7]
3	(Sweden) A Göransson (Portugal) G Oliveira	6	6
(Russia) E Donskoy (Russia) T Gabashvili	1	4
(India) S Balaji (India) D Sharan	3	6	[10]
(Australia) A Bolt (Australia) M Polmans	6	3	[6]
(Canada) S Diez (Spain) D Vega Hernández	6	6
(Finland) H Heliövaara (Ukraine) D Molchanov	4	4
(Germany) Y Maden (Austria) T-S Weissborn	3	6^{4}
4	(Netherlands) S Arends (Netherlands) D Pel	6	7^{7}
WC	(Czech Republic) Z Kolář (Czech Republic) L Rosol	6	7
(United States) R Galloway (Mexico) H Hach Verdugo	3	5
(Poland) K Majchrzak (Poland) S Walków	6^{6}	3
2	(Israel) J Erlich (Belarus) A Vasilevski	7^{8}	6

Quarterfinals
(Bosnia and Herzegovina) T Brkić (Switzerland) L Margaroli	2	3
WC	(Czech Republic) D Poljak (Czech Republic) D Svrčina	6	6
3	(Sweden) A Göransson (Portugal) G Oliveira	4	1
(India) S Balaji (India) D Sharan	6	6
(Canada) S Diez (Spain) D Vega Hernández	4	7	[7]
4	(Netherlands) S Arends (Netherlands) D Pel	6	5	[10]
WC	(Czech Republic) Z Kolář (Czech Republic) L Rosol	6	6
2	(Israel) J Erlich (Belarus) A Vasilevski	4	4

Semifinals
WC	(Czech Republic) D Poljak (Czech Republic) D Svrčina	1	5
(India) S Balaji (India) D Sharan	6	7
4	(Netherlands) S Arends (Netherlands) D Pel	1	6	[7]
WC	(Czech Republic) Z Kolář (Czech Republic) L Rosol	6	1	[10]

Final
(India) S Balaji (India) D Sharan	2	6	[6]
WC	(Czech Republic) Z Kolář (Czech Republic) L Rosol	6	2	[10]
