= Máté Valkusz =

Hungarian tennis player

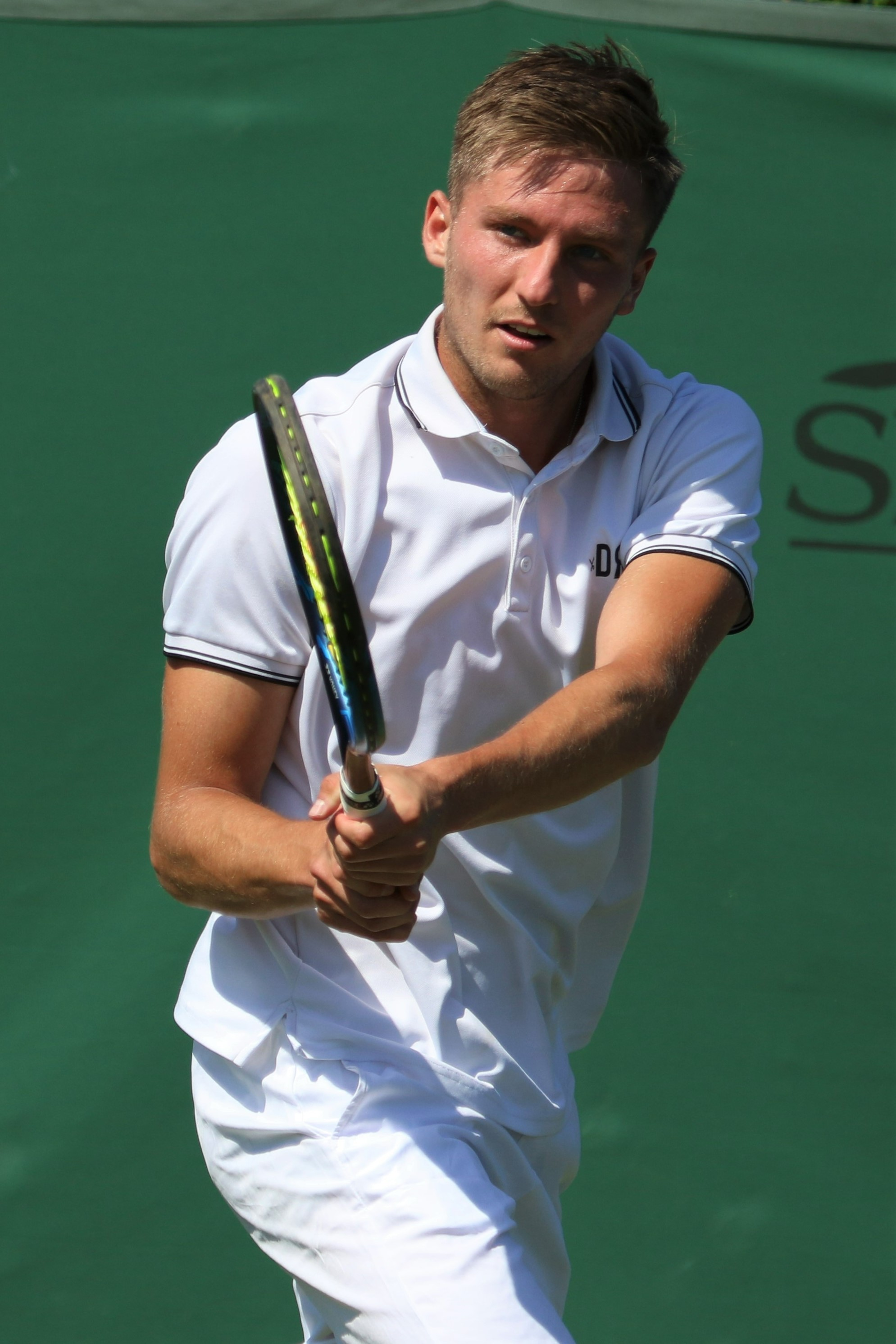
- Valkusz at the 2022 Wimbledon Championships
- Country (sports): Hungary
- Residence: Budapest, Hungary
- Born: 13 August 1998 (age 28) Budapest, Hungary
- Height: 1.83 m (6 ft 0 in)
- Plays: Right-handed (two handed-backhand)
- Coach: Zoltán Kuhárszky
- Prize money: US $305,896

Singles
- Career record: 2–7
- Career titles: 0
- Highest ranking: No. 204 (12 June 2023)
- Current ranking: No. 1,051 (14 September 2026)

Grand Slam singles results
- Australian Open: 1R (2024)
- French Open: Q1 (2024)
- Wimbledon: Q1 (2022)
- US Open: Q1 (2023)

Doubles
- Career record: 3–3
- Career titles: 0
- Highest ranking: No. 893 (18 October 2021)
- Current ranking: No. 2,341 (14 September 2026)

Team competitions
- Davis Cup: 2–2
- Last updated on: 17 September 2026.

Máté Valkusz (born 13 August 1998) is a Hungarian professional tennis player. Valkusz has a career-high ATP singles ranking of No. 204, achieved on 12 June 2023 and a doubles ranking of No. 893 achieved on 18 October 2021.

== Juniors ==
On the junior tour, Valkusz has a career high combined junior ranking of 1 achieved on 11 January 2016. Valkusz was the winner of the 2015 Yucatán Cup, a Grade 1 event in Mérida and the Canadian Open Junior Championships in Repentigny. He was also a semifinalist at the 2015 Orange Bowl and a finalist at the 2015 Osaka Mayor's Cup. Valkusz was also a semifinalist at the 2015 Australian Open boys' doubles and 2015 French Open boys' doubles events.

== Professional career ==
=== 2018: First Challenger final ===
He reached his first final at the 2018 Cordenons Challenger.

=== 2023: First Challenger title and ATP win, nearby top 200 ===
He won his first Challenger title defeating Francisco Comesaña at the 2023 Macedonian Open and reached the top 225 in the rankings on 29 May 2023.

He entered the 2023 Moselle Open as lucky loser and defeated ninth seed Daniel Altmaier in the first round, for his first ATP win.

=== 2024: Grand Slam debut, hiatus ===
Ranked No. 214, he qualified for the 2024 Australian Open making his Major debut, defeating Wu Tung-lin, Francisco Comesaña, and Andrea Vavassori in the last round of the qualifying competition. He lost to Max Purcell in the first round.

== ATP Challenger and ITF Tour Finals ==
=== Singles: 21 (16–5) ===
| Legend ATP Challenger Tour (1–2) ITF Futures/World Tennis Tour (15–3) | Titles by surface Hard (0–0) Clay (16–5) |

| Result | W–L | Date | Tournament | Tier | Surface | Opponent | Score |
|---|---|---|---|---|---|---|---|
| Loss | 0–1 | Aug 2017 | Germany F11, Karlsruhe | Futures | Clay | (Germany) Jan Choinski | 2-6, 4–6 |
| Win | 1–1 | Mar 2018 | Croatia F2, Poreč | Futures | Clay | (Romania) Dragoș Dima | 6–0, 6–3 |
| Win | 2–1 | May 2018 | Hungary F1, Zalaegerszeg | Futures | Clay | (Slovakia) Filip Horanský | 6–1, 6–3 |
| Win | 3–1 | May 2018 | Hungary F2, Zalaegerszeg | Futures | Clay | (Estonia) Kenneth Raisma | 6–2, 6–1 |
| Loss | 3–2 | Jun 2018 | Hungary F4, Gyula | Futures | Clay | (Austria) Lenny Hampel | 6–7^{(4–7)}, 0–3 ret. |
| Win | 4–2 | Jul 2018 | Portugal F12, Porto | Futures | Clay | (Portugal) Nuno Borges | 6–3, 6–2 |
| Loss | 4–3 | Aug 2018 | Cordenons Italy | Challenger | Clay | (Italy) Paolo Lorenzi | 3–6, 6–3, 4–6 |
| Win | 5–3 | Sep 2018 | Hungary F7, Székesfehérvár | Futures | Clay | (Egypt) Karim-Mohamed Maamoun | 3–6, 6–3, 6–3 |
| Win | 6–3 | Mar 2019 | M15 Opatija, Croatia | World Tennis Tour | Clay | (Bosnia and Herzegovina) Nerman Fatić | 6–4, 6–1 |
| Win | 7–3 | Aug 2019 | M15 Baja, Hungary | World Tennis Tour | Clay | (Argentina) Juan Manuel Cerúndolo | 6–4, 4–6, 6–2 |
| Win | 8–3 | Oct 2019 | M15 Antalya, Turkey | World Tennis Tour | Clay | (Hungary) Fábián Marozsán | 6–2, 7–5 |
| Loss | 8–4 | Dec 2019 | M15 Antalya, Turkey | World Tennis Tour | Clay | (Spain) Álvaro López San Martín | 6–4, 2–6, 4–6 |
| Win | 9–4 | Jul 2021 | M25 Kottingbrunn, Austria | World Tennis Tour | Clay | (Argentina) Francisco Comesaña | 6–1, 6–2 |
| Win | 10–4 | Aug 2021 | M15 Bratislava, Slovakia | World Tennis Tour | Clay | (Hungary) Fábián Marozsán | 3–6, 6–1, 5-4 ret. |
| Win | 11–4 | Aug 2021 | M15 Bratislava, Slovakia | World Tennis Tour | Clay | (Ukraine) Danylo Kalenichenko | 6–0, 6–2 |
| Win | 12-4 | Oct 2021 | M25 Budapest, Hungary | World Tennis Tour | Clay | (Poland) Pawel Cias | 6–3, 6–4 |
| Win | 13–4 | Mar 2022 | M25 Opatija, Croatia | World Tennis Tour | Clay | (Italy) Riccardo Bonadio | 4–6, 6–4, 6–2 |
| Loss | 13–5 | Apr 2023 | Ostrava, Czech Republic | Challenger | Clay | (Czech Republic) Zdeněk Kolář | 3–6, 2–6 |
| Win | 14–5 | May 2023 | Skopje, North Macedonia | Challenger | Clay | (Argentina) Francisco Comesaña | 6–3, 6–4 |
| Win | 15–5 | Jun 2025 | M15 Nyíregyháza, Hungary | World Tennis Tour | Clay | (Italy) Pietro Romeo Scomparin | 6–1, 7–5 |
| Win | 16–5 | Aug 2025 | M25 Maribor, Slovenia | World Tennis Tour | Clay | (Bosnia and Herzegovina) Mirza Bašić | 6–2, 3–6, 6–1 |

=== Doubles: 3 (3–0) ===
| Legend ATP Challengers (0–0) ITF World Tennis Tour (3–0) | Titles by surface Hard (0–0) Clay (3–0) |

| Result | W–L | Date | Tournament | Tier | Surface | Partner | Opponents | Score |
|---|---|---|---|---|---|---|---|---|
| Win | 1–0 | Oct 2019 | M15 Antalya Turkey | World Tennis Tour | Clay | (Hungary) Fábián Marozsán | (Russia) Vladimir Korolev (Russia) Ronald Slobodchikov | 7–5, 6–2 |
| Win | 2–0 | Dec 2019 | M15 Antalya Turkey | World Tennis Tour | Clay | (Hungary) Fábián Marozsán | (Spain) David Jordà Sanchis (Germany) Niklas Schell | 6–3, 7–5 |
| Win | 3–0 | Aug 2021 | M15 Bratislava Slovakia | World Tennis Tour | Clay | (Hungary) Zsombor Velcz | (Czech Republic) Andrew Paulson (Czech Republic) Robin Staněk | 3–6, 7–6^{(8–6)}, [10–7] |

== Davis Cup ==
=== Participations: (3–4) ===
| Group membership World Group (0–0) Qualifying Round (2–2) WG Play-off (0–2) Group I (1–0) Group II (0–0) Group III (0–0) Group IV (0–0) | Matches by surface Hard (2–2) Clay (1–2) Grass (0–0) Carpet (0–0) | Matches by type Singles (0–3) Doubles (3–1) |

- ▲ ▼ indicates the outcome of the Davis Cup match followed by the score, date, place of event, the zonal classification and its phase, and the court surface.

| Rubber outcome | No. | Rubber | Match type (partner if any) | Opponent nation | Opponent player(s) | Score |
▼2–3; 14–16 September 2018; Lurdy Ház, Budapest, Hungary; World Group play-off; clay surface
| Defeat | 1 | II | Singles | Czech Republic | Lukáš Rosol | 1–6, 2–6, 4–6 |
| Defeat | 2 | IV | Singles | Czech Republic | Jiří Veselý | 7–6^{(7–4)}, 3–6, 2–6, 4–6 |
▼2–3; 4-5 March 2022; Ken Rosewall Arena, Sydney, Australia; Davis Cup qualifying round; hard surface
| Victory | 3 | III | Doubles (with Fábián Marozsán) | Australia | John Peers / Luke Saville | 6–4, 6–4 |
▼2–3; 3-4 February 2023; Multifunctional Arena, Tatabánya, Hungary; Davis Cup qualifying round; hard (indoor) surface
| Victory | 4 | III | Doubles (with Fábián Marozsán) | France | Nicolas Mahut / Arthur Rinderknech | 6–2, 7–6^{(7–4)} |
▲3–0; 15–16 September 2023; Helikon Teniszcentrum, Keszthely, Hungary; World Group I first round; clay surface
| Victory | 5 | III | Doubles (with Fábián Marozsán) | Turkey | Altuğ Çelikbilek / Cem İlkel | 6–3, 6–3 |
▼2–3; 2-3 February 2024; Multifunctional Arena, Tatabánya, Hungary; Davis Cup qualifying round; hard (indoor) surface
| Defeat | 6 | III | Doubles (with Fábián Marozsán) | Germany | Kevin Krawietz / Tim Pütz | 3–6, 6–7^{(3–7)} |
| Defeat | 7 | IV | Singles | Germany | Jan-Lennard Struff | 3–6, 2–6 |

== Record against other players ==
Valkusz's match record against players who have been ranked in the top 100, with those who are active in boldface.
ATP Tour, Challenger and Future tournaments' main draw and qualifying matches are considered.

| Opponent | Highest ranking | Matches | Won | Lost | Win % | Last match |
|---|---|---|---|---|---|---|
| (Greece) **Stefanos Tsitsipas** | 3 | 1 | 0 | 1 | 0% | Lost (4–6, 3–6) at 2016 Italy F12 1R |
| (Italy) **Jannik Sinner** | 9 | 1 | 0 | 1 | 0% | Lost (2–6, 6–0, 4–6) at 2019 Budapest 1R |
| (Latvia) **Ernests Gulbis** | 10 | 1 | 1 | 0 | 100% | Won (6–2, 6–3) at 2022 Vilnius 1R |
| (Russia) **Aslan Karatsev** | 14 | 1 | 0 | 1 | 0% | Lost (6–7^{(1-7)}, 2–6) at 2018 Egypt F2 2R |
| (Italy) **Marco Cecchinato** | 16 | 1 | 0 | 1 | 0% | Lost (5–7, 1–6) at 2018 Budapest 1R |
| (Italy) **Lorenzo Musetti** | 18 | 1 | 0 | 1 | 0% | Lost (6–1, 6–7^{(0-7)}, 4–6) at 2019 Turkey M15 SF |
| (Bosnia and Herzegovina) **Damir Džumhur** | 23 | 1 | 1 | 0 | 100% | Won (5–2 ret.) at 2022 Mauthausen 1R |
| (Czech Republic) **Lukáš Rosol** | 26 | 1 | 0 | 1 | 0% | Lost (1–6, 2–6, 4–6) at 2018 Davis Cup WG PO |
| (Spain) **Alejandro Davidovich Fokina** | 27 | 1 | 0 | 1 | 0% | Lost (1–6, 2–6) at 2018 Liuzhou 2R |
| (Italy) Paolo Lorenzi | 33 | 1 | 0 | 1 | 0% | Lost (3–6, 6–3, 4–6) at 2018 Cordenons F |
| (Australia) **John Millman** | 33 | 1 | 1 | 0 | 100% | Won (6–4, 1–6, 6–3) at 2022 Mauthausen QF |
| (Czech Republic) **Jiří Veselý** | 35 | 1 | 0 | 1 | 0% | Lost (7–6^{(7-4)}, 3–6, 2–6, 4–6) at 2018 Davis Cup WG PO |
| (Slovakia) **Alex Molčan** | 38 | 1 | 1 | 0 | 100% | Won (6–1, 2–6, 6–1) at 2016 Hungary F5 1R |
| (Moldova) **Radu Albot** | 39 | 1 | 1 | 0 | 100% | Won (6–3, 1–6, 6–2) at 2022 Sanremo 2R |
| (Germany) **Peter Gojowczyk** | 39 | 1 | 0 | 1 | 0% | Lost (4–6, 4–6) at 2023 Rovereto 1R |
| (Finland) **Emil Ruusuvuori** | 40 | 1 | 1 | 0 | 100% | Won (7–6^{(7-3)}, 6–2) at 2018 Hungary F1 QF |
| (Russia) **Teymuraz Gabashvili** | 43 | 1 | 0 | 1 | 0% | Lost (4–6, 1–0 ret.) at 2019 L'Aquila 1R |
| (France) **Constant Lestienne** | 48 | 1 | 0 | 1 | 0% | Lost (0–6, 0–6) at 2017 Hungary F4 QF |
| (Argentina) **Federico Coria** | 49 | 2 | 0 | 2 | 0% | Lost (0–3 ret.) at 2022 Sibiu SF |
| (Ukraine) **Illya Marchenko** | 49 | 1 | 0 | 1 | 0% | Lost (2–6, 3–6) at 2022 Bergamo Q1 |
| (Lithuania) **Ričardas Berankis** | 50 | 1 | 0 | 1 | 0% | Lost (6–7^{(3-7)}, 1–6) at 2023 Oeiras 1R |
| (Romania) **Marius Copil** | 56 | 1 | 1 | 0 | 100% | Won (7–6^{(7-3)}, 7–6^{(7-4)}) at 2022 Sibiu 1R |
| (France) **Quentin Halys** | 61 | 1 | 1 | 0 | 100% | Won (6–7^{(3-7)}, 6–1, 7–6^{(7-4)}) at 2018 Budapest 1R |
| (Italy) **Gianluca Mager** | 62 | 1 | 0 | 1 | 0% | Lost (6–3, 6–7^{(5-7)}, 4–6) at 2018 Pullach Q1 |
| (United States) **Ernesto Escobedo** | 67 | 1 | 0 | 1 | 0% | Lost (0–6, 3–6) at 2018 Monterrey 1R |
| (Slovenia) Blaž Kavčič | 68 | 1 | 0 | 1 | 0% | Lost (2–6 ret.) at 2018 Shenzhen QF |
| (Italy) **Thomas Fabbiano** | 70 | 1 | 1 | 0 | 100% | Won (7–6^{(7-5)}, 7–5) at 2018 Shenzhen 2R |
| (Poland) **Kamil Majchrzak** | 75 | 1 | 0 | 1 | 0% | Lost (5–7, 6–3, 0–4 ret.) at 2016 Hungary F1 QF |
| (Hungary) **Attila Balázs** | 76 | 3 | 1 | 2 | 33% | Won (6–4, 6–3) at 2019 Rome 2R |
| (Argentina) **Juan Manuel Cerúndolo** | 79 | 1 | 1 | 0 | 100% | Won (6–4, 4–6, 6–2) at 2019 Hungary M15 F |
| (Portugal) **Nuno Borges** | 80 | 1 | 1 | 0 | 100% | Won (6–3, 6–2) at 2018 Portugal F12 F |
| (Slovakia) **Norbert Gombos** | 80 | 1 | 0 | 1 | 0% | Lost (4–6, 2–6) at 2017 Budapest 1R |
| (Spain) **Carlos Taberner** | 85 | 1 | 1 | 0 | 100% | Won (7–6^{(7-5)}, 6–3) at 2023 Tenerife 1R |
| (Russia) **Pavel Kotov** | 96 | 1 | 0 | 1 | 0% | Lost (6–7^{(7-9)}, 6–3, 3–6) at 2019 Turkey M15 QF |
| (Belgium) **Kimmer Coppejans** | 97 | 1 | 0 | 1 | 0% | Lost (3–6, 2–6) at 2019 Bratislava 1R |
| Total | | 38 | 13 | 25 | 34% | * Statistics correct as of 6 March 2023 |

== Personal life ==
His father Tamás Valkusz was a javelin thrower, and his brother Milán Valkusz is a member a Hungarian Music Awards winner pop duo VALMAR.
