= Nerman Fatić =

Bosnian tennis player (born 1994)

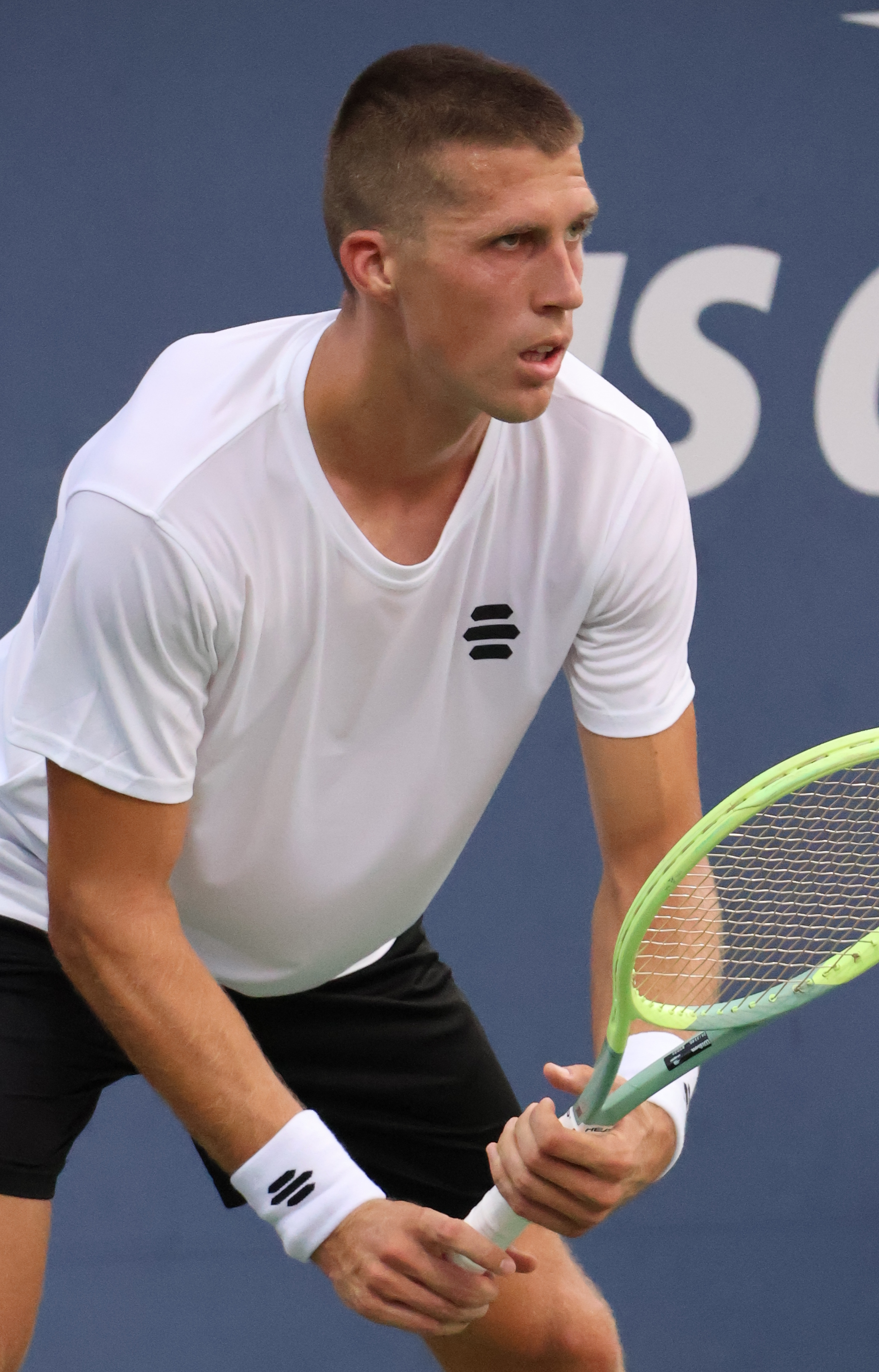
- Fatić at the 2023 US Open
- Country (sports): Bosnia and Herzegovina
- Born: 24 October 1994 (age 32) Sarajevo, Bosnia and Herzegovina
- Height: 1.91 m (6 ft 3 in)
- Turned pro: 2014
- Plays: Right-handed (two-handed backhand)
- Coach: Patricio Remondegui
- Prize money: US $487,960

Singles
- Career record: 5–6
- Career titles: 0
- Highest ranking: No. 191 (7 August 2023)
- Current ranking: No. 588 (26 October 2026)

Grand Slam singles results
- Australian Open: Q2 (2024)
- French Open: Q2 (2026)
- Wimbledon: Q1 (2024)
- US Open: Q1 (2023)

Doubles
- Career record: 3–2
- Career titles: 0
- Highest ranking: No. 449 (21 March 2022)
- Current ranking: No. 841 (26 October 2026)
- Last updated on: 26 October 2026.

Nerman Fatić (born 24 October 1994) is a Bosnian professional tennis player. He is a member of the Bosnia and Herzegovina Davis Cup team. He has a career-high ATP singles ranking of No. 191 achieved on 7 August 2023 and a doubles ranking of No. 449 achieved on 21 March 2022. He is currently Bosnia and Herzegovina's No. 2 player.

== Performance timeline ==
Key
W	F	SF	QF	#R	RR	Q#	DNQ	A	NH

(W) winner; (F) finalist; (SF) semifinalist; (QF) quarterfinalist; (#R) rounds 4, 3, 2, 1; (RR) round-robin stage; (Q#) qualification round; (DNQ) did not qualify; (A) absent; (NH) not held; (SR) strike rate (events won / competed); (W–L) win–loss record.

=== Singles ===
Tournament	2023	2024	2025	2026	SR	W–L	Win%
Grand Slam tournaments
Australian Open	A	Q2	A	Q1	0 / 0	0–0	–
French Open	A	Q1	A		0 / 0	0–0	–
Wimbledon	A	Q1	A		0 / 0	0–0	–
US Open	Q1	A	A		0 / 0	0–0	–
Win–loss	0–0	0–0	0–0	0–0	0 / 0	0–0	–
ATP Masters 1000
Indian Wells Masters	A	A	A		0 / 0	0–0	–
Miami Open	A	A	A		0 / 0	0–0	–
Monte Carlo Masters	A	A	A		0 / 0	0–0	–
Madrid Open	A	A	A		0 / 0	0-0	–
Italian Open	A	Q1	A		0 / 0	0–0	–
Canadian Open	A	A	A		0 / 0	0–0	–
Cincinnati Masters	A	A	A		0 / 0	0–0	–
Shanghai Masters	A	A	A		0 / 0	0–0	–
Paris Masters	A	A	A		0 / 0	0–0	–
Win–loss	0–0	0–0	0–0	0–0	0 / 0	0–0	–

== ATP Challenger and ITF Tour Finals ==
=== Singles: 23 (12–11) ===
Legend (singles) ATP Challenger Tour (2–2) ITF Futures/World Tennis Tour (10–9)	Titles by surface Hard (0–0) Clay (12–11)

Result	W–L	Date	Tournament	Tier	Surface	Opponent	Score
Loss	0–1	Jun 2014	Bulgaria F2, Stara Zagora	Futures	Clay	(United Kingdom) Jack Carpenter	6–4, 4–6, 2–6
Loss	0–2	Jul 2016	Serbia F1, Belgrade	Futures	Clay	(Australia) Christopher O'Connell	4–6, 1–6
Loss	0–3	Jul 2017	Georgia F3, Telavi	Futures	Clay	(Russia) Kirill Kivattsev	6–7^{(4–7)}, 6–7^{(6–8)}
Loss	0–4	May 2018	Bosnia & Herzegovina F1, Doboj	Futures	Clay	(France) Manuel Guinard	3–6, 4–6
Win	1–4	Jul 2018	Austria F2, Kramsach	Futures	Clay	(Germany) Johannes Härteis	1–6, 6–3, 6–1
Loss	1–5	Jul 2018	Austria F3, Wels	Futures	Clay	(Czech Republic) Michael Vrbenský	5–7, 6–4, 3–6
Win	2–5	Nov 2018	Turkey F36, Antalya	Futures	Clay	(Italy) Dante Gennaro	6–2, 6–0
Loss	2–6	Mar 2019	M15 Opatija, Croatia	World Tennis Tour	Clay	(Hungary) Máté Valkusz	4–6, 1–6
Win	3–6	Sep 2019	M15 Zlatibor, Serbia	World Tennis Tour	Clay	(Hungary) Péter Nagy	7–5, 6–3
Win	4–6	Sep 2019	M25 Santa Margherita Di Pula, Italy	World Tennis Tour	Clay	(Italy) Flavio Cobolli	6–2, 6–2
Win	5–6	Sep 2019	M25 Santa Margherita Di Pula, Italy	World Tennis Tour	Clay	(Croatia) Nino Serdarušić	6–2, 6–1
Not Played	5–6	Dec 2020	M15 Antalya, Turkey	World Tennis Tour	Clay	(Sweden) Dragoș Nicolae Mădăraș	Bad weather
Loss	5–7	May 2021	M15 Prijedor, Bosnia Herzegovina	World Tennis Tour	Clay	(Bosnia and Herzegovina) Aldin Šetkić	3–6, 6–4, 2–6
Win	6–7	Mar 2022	M25 Antalya, Turkey	World Tennis Tour	Clay	(Ukraine) Oleksii Krutykh	7–6^{(7–4)}, 6–4
Win	7–7	Sep 2022	Sibiu, Romania	Challenger	Clay	(Bosnia and Herzegovina) Damir Džumhur	6–3, 6–4
Win	8–7	Sep 2023	Sibiu, Romania	Challenger	Clay	(Bosnia and Herzegovina) Damir Džumhur	6–2, 6–4
Loss	8–8	Nov 2023	M25 Antalya, Turkey	World Tennis Tour	Clay	(United Kingdom) Jay Clarke	4–6, 5–7
Win	9–8	Nov 2024	M25 Antalya, Turkey	World Tennis Tour	Clay	(Italy) Manuel Mazza	7–5, 6–4
Win	10–8	Feb 2025	M15 Antalya, Turkey	World Tennis Tour	Clay	(Bosnia and Herzegovina) Andrej Nedić	6–2, 6–3
Win	11–8	Mar 2025	M15 Poreč, Croatia	World Tennis Tour	Clay	(Austria) Sandro Kopp	6–2, 6–1
Loss	11–9	Apr 2025	M15 Dubrovnik, Croatia	World Tennis Tour	Clay	(Croatia) Luka Mikrut	2–6, 4–6
Loss	11–10	May 2025	Skopje, North Macedonia	Challenger	Clay	(United Kingdom) Jay Clarke	2–6, 3–6
Loss	11–11	June 2025	Perugia, Italy	Challenger	Clay	(Italy) Andrea Pellegrino	2–6, 4–6
Win	12–11	Sep 2025	M25 Zlatibor, Serbia	World Tennis Tour	Clay	(Serbia) Dušan Obradović	7–5, 6–3

=== Doubles titles (7) ===
Legend
Challengers (0–0)
Futures (7–4)

Outcome	No.	Date	Tournament	Tier	Surface	Partner	Finals Opponents	Score
loss	1.	10 June 2013	Doboj, Bosnia & Herzegovina	Futures	Clay	(Bosnia and Herzegovina) Ismar Gorčić	(Bosnia and Herzegovina) Tomislav Brkić (Croatia) Duje Kekez	3–6, 4–6
Win	2.	8 July 2013	Sharm El Sheikh, Egypt	Futures	Clay	(Bosnia and Herzegovina) Ismar Gorčić	(Venezuela) Luis David Martinez (Netherlands) Mark Vervoort	6–3, 6–3
Win	3.	15 July 2013	Sharm El Sheikh, Egypt	Futures	Clay	(Bosnia and Herzegovina) Ismar Gorčić	(Tunisia) Skander Mansouri (Burundi) Hassan Ndayishimiye	6–3, 6–4
Win	4.	16 June 2014	Stara Zagora, Bulgaria	Futures	Clay	(North Macedonia) Tomislav Jotovski	(Czech Republic) Jan Blecha (Bulgaria) Alexandar Lazov	7–5, 6–2
loss	5.	27 July 2015	Sombor, Serbia	Futures	Clay	(Serbia) Miki Janković	(Croatia) Ivan Sabanov (Croatia) Matej Sabanov	4–6, 0–6
Win	6.	26 October 2015	Heraklion, Greece	Futures	Hard	(Serbia) Miki Janković	(Czech Republic) Filip Doležel (Czech Republic) Václav Šafránek	6–3, 3–6, [10–4]
Win	7.	7 March 2016	Antalya, Turkey	Futures	Clay	(Croatia) Franjo Raspudić	(Ukraine) Oleksandr Bielinskyi (France) Ronan Joncour	6–7^{(4)}, 6–4, [10–8]
Win	8.	25 July 2016	Sombor, Serbia	Futures	Clay	(Montenegro) Ljubomir Čelebić	(Croatia) Domagoj Bilješko (Croatia) Borna Gojo	1–6, 6–3, [10–6]
loss	9.	16 April 2017	Hammamet, Tunisia	Futures	Clay	(Italy) Davide Galoppini	(France) Antoine Hoang (Morocco) Lamine Ouahab	3–6, 4–6
Win	10	11 June 2017	Kiseljak, Bosnia & Herzegovina	Futures	Clay	(Croatia) Antun Vidak	(Italy) Erik Crepaldi (Mexico) Lucas Gómez	6–4, 2–6, [10–4]
loss		16 July 2017	Telavi, Georgia	Futures	Clay	(Croatia) Antun Vidak	(Bolivia) Boris Arias (Bolivia) Federico Zeballos	7–5, 3–6, 8–10
Loss		Feb 2026	Challenger Città di Lugano, Switzerland	Challenger	Hard (i)	(Bosnia and Herzegovina) Mirza Bašić	(Serbia) Stefan Latinović (Ukraine) Vitaliy Sachko	3–6, 4–6
