= Sriram Balaji =

Indian tennis player (born 1990)

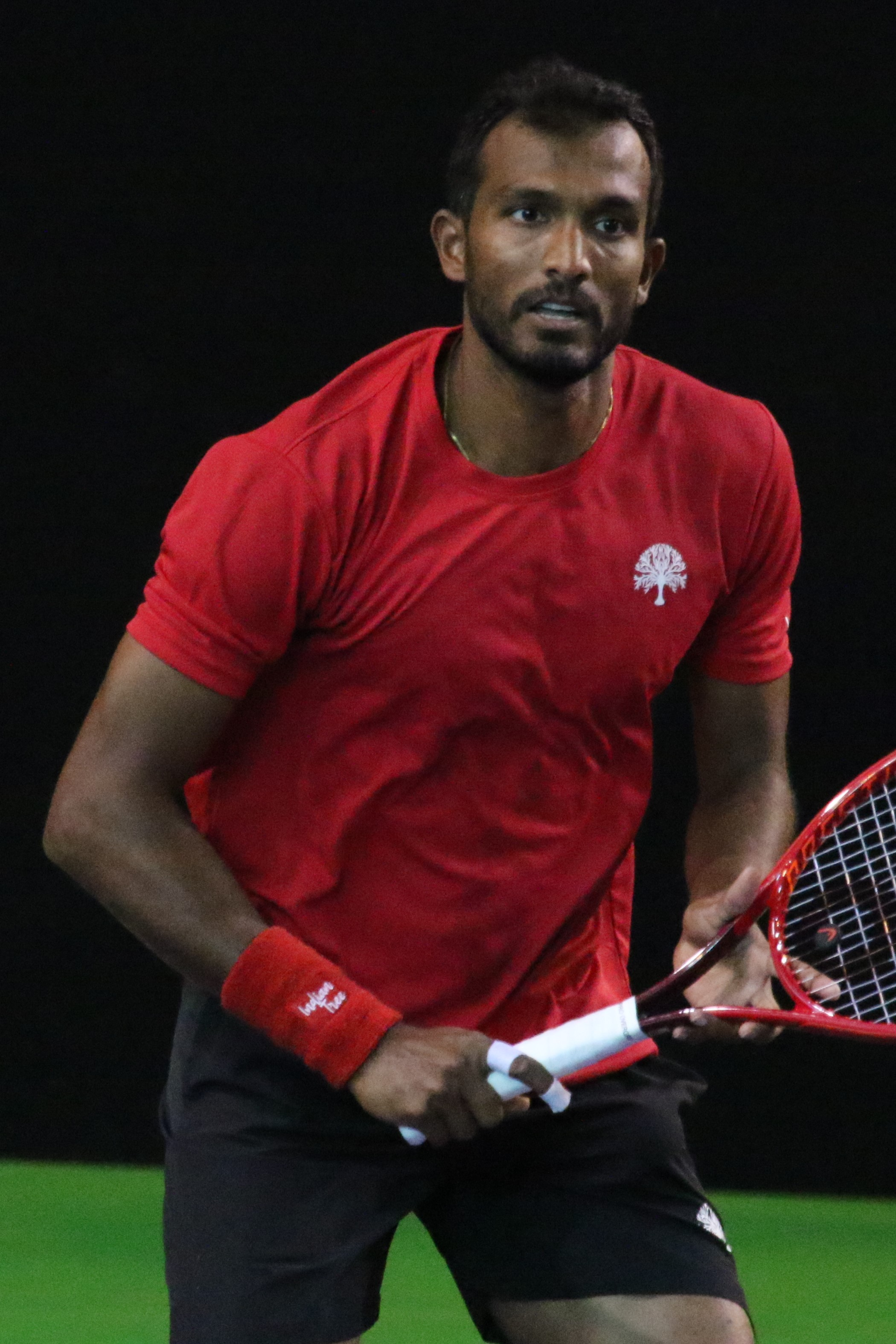
- Balaji at the 2021 Internationaux de Tennis de Vendée
- Full name: Sriram Balaji Narayanaswamy
- ITF name: N. Sriram Balaji
- Country (sports): India
- Residence: Coimbatore, Tamil Nadu, India
- Born: 18 March 1990 (age 36) Coimbatore, Tamil Nadu, India
- Height: 1.80 m (5 ft 11 in)
- Plays: Right-handed (two handed-backhand)
- Prize money: US $808,272

Singles
- Career record: 1–2
- Career titles: 0
- Highest ranking: No. 287 (19 June 2017)

Doubles
- Career record: 47–69
- Career titles: 0
- Highest ranking: No. 49 (14 September 2026)
- Current ranking: No. 49 (14 September 2026)

Grand Slam doubles results
- Australian Open: 2R (2023, 2024, 2025, 2026)
- French Open: QF (2026)
- Wimbledon: 2R (2018, 2025)
- US Open: 2R (2024, 2026)

Other doubles tournaments
- Olympic Games: 1R (2024)
- Military career
- Branch: Indian Army
- Service years: 2017–present
- Rank: Naib Subedar
- Unit: Madras Engineer Group
Medal record
Men's tennis
Representing India
South Asian Games
Gold medal – first place	2019 Kathmandu	Mixed doubles
Gold medal – first place	2019 Kathmandu	Team
Silver medal – second place	2019 Kathmandu	Doubles
- Last updated on: 14 September 2026.

Sriram Balaji Narayanaswamy (born 18 March 1990) is an Indian professional tennis player who specializes in doubles. He has a career high ATP doubles ranking of world No. 49 achieved on 14 September 2026 and a singles ranking of No. 287 achieved on 19 June 2017.

Balaji has won a total of 9 ITF singles titles on the futures circuit as well as 43 doubles ITF Futures and 6 Challenger doubles titles on the circuit. He is currently a member of the Indian Davis Cup team. He played his debut Davis cup partnering Rohan Bopanna in March 2017 making India win 3–0 and enter into Davis Cup World Play off.

== Personal life ==
Sriram was born to Narayanaswamy and Jayanthi Narayanaswamy in Coimbatore. He started playing tennis at the age of nine. He succeeded his schooling from Kendriya Vidyalaya and PERKS Matriculation Higher Secondary School in Coimbatore. He started his tennis career at PERKS Tennis Academy, Coimbatore. He is currently getting trained at Schüttler-Waske Tennis University in Germany. His hobbies are swimming and reading books. His favorite tennis player is Roger Federer. Balaji is presently a Junior Officer in the Indian Army. The Army has supported his sports endeavours.

== Junior career ==
- Represented India for the Nike International Masters Tennis Tournament held at Sun City, South Africa during November 2002 and Won Three Countries and obtained ninth position in the Team event.
- Ranked No.1 in National Level Competition Under 14 age Category during April – September 2004.
- Represented India for the Asia/Oceania Qualifying, World Junior Tennis Competition held at Melbourne, Australia during MAY 10 – 15, 2004. 16 Countries participated and obtained 11th Position in Team event.
- Represented India for Junior Davis Cup Tournament held at Kuching, Malaysia during April 2006.
- Participated in 15th Asian Games, Youth Camp during 28 November to 9 December 2006 held at Doha, Qatar.

== Career ==
Balaji made his ATP main draw debut at the 2012 Aircel Chennai Open in the doubles event, partnering Jeevan Nedunchezhiyan. The wildcard pairing put up a good fight, but lost to the second seeds Scott Lipsky and Rajeev Ram 5–7, 4–6.

At the 2014 Aircel Chennai Open, Balaji was given a wildcard into the doubles event with Ramkumar Ramanathan. The Indian pair defeated Lipsky and Ram, who Balaji had lost to in 2012, 7–5, 6–3. In the quarterfinals the pair lost to Croatian-duo Marin Draganja and Mate Pavić, 3–6, 3–6.

Balaji joined the Mumbai Tennis Masters team for Champions Tennis League India.

He reached his first ATP final at the 2023 Tata Open Maharashtra with compatriot Jeevan Nedunchezhiyan as an alternate pair. They defeated compatriots Purav Raja and Divij Sharan in straight sets in first round. In the quarterfinals, they upset second seeds Nathaniel Lammons and Jackson Withrow in straight sets winning both sets in a tiebreak. Next they defeated British pair of Julian Cash and Henry Patten in the semifinals in straight sets to reach their first ATP Tour final as a team. Despite not losing a single set on their way to final they were defeated in straight sets by Sander Gillé and Joran Vliegen in the final.

He won his second Grand Slam doubles match at the 2023 Australian Open with Nedunchezhiyan defeating fifth seeds Ivan Dodig and Austin Krajicek as an alternate pair.

He entered the main draw of the 2023 French Open making his debut at this Major also as an alternate pair with Nedunchezhiyan.

He reached the third round recording his first wins at the 2024 French Open as an alternate pair partnering Miguel Ángel Reyes-Varela over alternates Sem Verbeek and Reese Stalder, and wildcards Théo Arribagé and Dan Added.

== ATP career finals ==
=== Doubles: 1 (1 runner-up) ===
Legend Grand Slam tournaments (0–0) ATP World Tour Finals (0–0) ATP World Tour Masters 1000 (0–0) ATP World Tour 500 Series (0–0) ATP World Tour 250 Series (0–1)	Titles by surface Hard (0–1) Clay (0–0) Grass (0–0)	Titles by setting Outdoor (0–1) Indoor (0–0)

Result	W–L	Date	Tournament	Tier	Surface	Partner	Opponents	Score
Loss	0–1	Jan 2023	Maharashtra Open, India	250 Series	Hard	(India) Jeevan Nedunchezhiyan	(Belgium) Sander Gillé (Belgium) Joran Vliegen	4–6, 4–6

== ATP Challenger and ITF Tour finals ==
=== Singles: 23 (9–14) ===
Legend (singles) ATP Challenger Tour (0–0) ITF Futures Tour (9–14)	Titles by surface Hard (7–9) Clay (2–5)

Result	W–L	Date	Tournament	Tier	Surface	Opponent	Score
Loss	0–1	Dec 2011	India F12, Kolkata	Futures	Clay	(India) Jeevan Nedunchezhiyan	2–6, 1–6
Loss	0–2	Feb 2012	India F1, Chandigarh	Futures	Hard	(India) Sanam Singh	5–7, 3–6
Win	1–2	May 2012	India F6, Chennai	Futures	Clay	(Switzerland) Joss Espasandin	6–3, 6–4
Loss	1–3	Jun 2012	India F8, Mysore	Futures	Hard	(India) Vishnu Vardhan	6–7^{(7–9)}, 3–6
Win	2–3	Aug 2012	Iran F1, Esfahan	Futures	Clay	(India) Vijay Sundar Prashanth	6–3, 6–2
Loss	2–4	Dec 2012	India F15, Davanagere	Futures	Hard	(India) Sanam Singh	2–6, 6–7^{(4–7)}
Win	3–4	Jun 2013	India F7, Chennai	Futures	Hard	(India) Jeevan Nedunchezhiyan	6–7^{(6–8)}, 6–4, 6–0
Loss	3–5	Nov 2013	India F9, Delhi	Futures	Hard	(India) Yuki Bhambri	2–6, 2–6
Win	4–5	Nov 2013	India F10, Bhopal	Futures	Hard	(South Korea) Na Jung-woong	7–5, 7–5
Loss	4–6	Mar 2014	India F4, Trichy	Futures	Clay	(Spain) Enrique López Pérez	4–6, 4–6
Win	5–6	Aug 2014	Kazakhstan F11, Astana	Futures	Hard	(Chinese Taipei) Huang Liang-chi	6–3, 6–2
Loss	5–7	Aug 2014	Chinese Taipei F2, Kaohsiung	Futures	Hard	(Russia) Karen Khachanov	7–6^{(7–4)}, 4–6, 3–6
Loss	5–8	Nov 2014	India F6, Kolkata	Futures	Clay	(India) Ranjeet Virali-Murugesan	3–6, 4–6
Win	6–8	Nov 2014	India F8, Gwalior	Futures	Hard	(India) Mohit Mayur Jayaprakash	6–3, 6–7^{(4–7)}, 6–3
Win	7–8	Sep 2016	Thailand F2, Hua Hin	Futures	Hard	(South Korea) Hong Seong-chan	6–4, 7–6^{(7–3)}
Loss	7–9	Sep 2016	India F4, Chennai	Futures	Clay	(India) Prajnesh Gunneswaran	6–3, 5–7, 6–7^{(3–7)}
Loss	7–10	Sep 2016	India F5, Chennai	Futures	Hard	(India) Vishnu Vardhan	4–6, 3–6
Loss	7–11	Feb 2017	India F1, Chandigarh	Futures	Hard	(India) Yuki Bhambri	2–6, 2–6
Win	8–11	Feb 2017	India F2, Jorhat	Futures	Hard	(India) Vishnu Vardhan	6–2, 7–6^{(7–1)}
Loss	8–12	Mar 2017	India F4, Bhilai	Futures	Hard	(India) Prajnesh Gunneswaran	4–6, 2–6
Win	9–12	Mar 2017	India F5, Bangalore	Futures	Hard	(India) Prajnesh Gunneswaran	2–6, 6–3, 6–4
Loss	9–13	Mar 2017	India F6, Trivandrum	Futures	Clay	(India) Prajnesh Gunneswaran	5–7, 3–6
Loss	9–14	Jun 2017	Uzbekistan F3, Andijan	Futures	Hard	(Uzbekistan) Sanjar Fayziev	3–6, 3–6

=== Doubles: 106 (62–44) ===
Legend (doubles) ATP Challenger Tour (19–19) ITF Futures Tour (43–25)	Titles by surface Hard (48–24) Clay (13–20) Grass (0–0) Carpet (1–0)

Result	W–L	Date	Tournament	Tier	Surface	Partner	Opponents	Score
Loss	0–1	Jul 2007	India F6, Chennai	Futures	Clay	(India) Vijay Sundar Prashanth	(India) Jeevan Nedunchezhiyan (India) Vivek Shokeen	5–7, 4–6
Win	1–1	Apr 2009	India F3, New Delhi	Futures	Hard	(India) Ashutosh Singh	(Japan) Yuichi Ito (South Africa) Raven Klaasen	7–6^{(7–1)}, 7–6^{(9–7)}
Loss	1–2	Apr 2010	India F3, Vijayawada	Futures	Hard	(India) Vignesh Peranamallur	(India) Divij Sharan (India) Vishnu Vardhan	6–2, 3–6, [3–10]
Win	2–2	Nov 2010	Thailand F5, Nonthaburi	Futures	Hard	(India) Vijayant Malik	(China) Gao Peng (China) Gao Wan	6–3, 7–6^{(9–7)}
Loss	2–3	Mar 2011	India F2, Kolkata	Futures	Clay	(India) Ashutosh Singh	(India) Divij Sharan (India) Vishnu Vardhan	6–7^{(1–7)}, 6–7^{(5–7)}
Loss	2–4	Nov 2011	India F12, New Delhi	Futures	Hard	(India) Vijayant Malik	(India) Karan Rastogi (India) Vishnu Vardhan	1–6, 3–6
Win	3–4	Dec 2011	India F12, Kolkata	Futures	Clay	(India) Vinayak Sharma Kaza	(India) Jeevan Nedunchezhiyan (India) Vijay Sundar Prashanth	6–3, 4–6, [10–3]
Win	4–4	Mar 2012	India F2, Bhopal	Futures	Hard	(India) Ranjeet Virali-Murugesan	(India) Vijay Sundar Prashanth (India) Arun-Prakash Rajagopalan	7–6^{(7–5)}, 3–6, [10–6]
Win	5–4	Apr 2012	Vietnam F1, Ho Chi Minh City	Futures	Hard	(India) Rohan Gajjar	(Australia) Dane Propoggia (New Zealand) Jose Statham	6–3, 6–4
Win	6–4	Apr 2012	India F5, Madurai	Futures	Clay	(India) Vignesh Peranamallur	(Portugal) André Gaspar Murta (Italy) Matthieu Viérin	7–6^{(7–4)}, 7–6^{(7–5)}
Win	7–4	Jun 2012	India F7, Mandya	Futures	Hard	(India) Arun-Prakash Rajagopalan	(India) Saketh Myneni (China) Ouyang Bowen	7–5, 6–1
Win	8–4	Jun 2012	India F8, Mysore	Futures	Hard	(India) Arun-Prakash Rajagopalan	(India) Kunal Anand (India) Ajai Selvaraj	3–6, 6–1, [10–6]
Loss	8–5	Jun 2012	India F9, Bangalore	Futures	Hard	(India) Arun-Prakash Rajagopalan	(India) Jeevan Nedunchezhiyan (India) Ranjeet Virali-Murugesan	6–4, 3–6, [7–10]
Win	9–5	Jul 2012	Germany F7, Römerberg	Futures	Clay	(India) Vijay Sundar Prashanth	(Austria) Lukas Jastraunig (Austria) Marc Rath	7–5, 6–4
Loss	9–6	Aug 2012	Iran F1, Esfahan	Futures	Clay	(India) Ranjeet Virali-Murugesan	(Czech Republic) Roman Jebavý (Czech Republic) Michal Schmid	4–6, 4–6
Win	10–6	Sep 2012	Iran F2, Esfahan	Futures	Clay	(India) Ranjeet Virali-Murugesan	(Uzbekistan) Sarvar Ikramov (Uzbekistan) Sergey Shipilov	6–1, 6–1
Loss	10–7	Oct 2012	India F13, Mumbai	Futures	Hard	(India) Arun-Prakash Rajagopalan	(India) Saketh Myneni (India) Purav Raja	0–6, 6–4, [8–10]
Loss	10–8	Nov 2012	India F14, Pune	Futures	Hard	(India) Arun-Prakash Rajagopalan	(India) Saketh Myneni (India) Purav Raja	5–7, 7–6^{(7–3)}, [5–10]
Win	11–8	Dec 2012	India F15, Davanagere	Futures	Hard	(India) Jeevan Nedunchezhiyan	(India) Vijay Sundar Prashanth (India) Arun-Prakash Rajagopalan	6–7^{(4–7)}, 6–4, [10–1]
Loss	11–9	Mar 2013	India F1, Chennai	Futures	Clay	(India) Jeevan Nedunchezhiyan	(Japan) Arata Onozawa (India) Arun-Prakash Rajagopalan	4–6, 6–0, [7–10]
Win	12–9	May 2013	India F4, Chandigarh	Futures	Hard	(India) Ranjeet Virali-Murugesan	(India) Arun-Prakash Rajagopalan (India) Vishnu Vardhan	6–3, 6–4
Loss	12–10	May 2013	India F5, Rohtak	Futures	Hard	(India) Ranjeet Virali-Murugesan	(India) Saketh Myneni (India) Arun-Prakash Rajagopalan	4–6, 3–6
Win	13–10	Jun 2013	India F6, Chennai	Futures	Hard	(India) Jeevan Nedunchezhiyan	(Japan) Toshihide Matsui (Japan) Bumpei Sato	6–1, 6–4
Win	14–10	Jun 2013	India F7, Chennai	Futures	Hard	(India) Jeevan Nedunchezhiyan	(South Africa) Keith-Patrick Crowley (India) Arun-Prakash Rajagopalan	6–2, 6–7^{(6–8)}, [10–5]
Win	15–10	Aug 2013	China F6, Zhangjiagang	Futures	Hard	(India) Ranjeet Virali-Murugesan	(South Korea) Lim Yong-kyu (Japan) Toshihide Matsui	7–5, 7–6^{(7–4)}
Win	16–10	Aug 2013	China F7, Tianjin	Futures	Hard	(India) Ranjeet Virali-Murugesan	(South Korea) Chung Hyeon (South Korea) Nam Ji-sung	6–3, 6–2
Loss	16–11	Sep 2013	Egypt F22, Sharm El Sheikh	Futures	Clay	(India) Ranjeet Virali-Murugesan	(Ecuador) Sebastián Rivera (Chile) Ricardo Urzúa Rivera	4–6, 6–7^{(4–7)}
Loss	16–12	Sep 2013	Egypt F23, Sharm El Sheikh	Futures	Clay	(India) Ranjeet Virali-Murugesan	(Colombia) Cristian Rodríguez (Chile) Ricardo Urzúa Rivera	5–7, 1–6
Win	17–12	Sep 2013	Egypt F24, Sharm El Sheikh	Futures	Clay	(India) Ranjeet Virali-Murugesan	(Egypt) Karim Hossam (Egypt) Karim-Mohamed Maamoun	6–4, 7–6^{(12–10)}
Loss	17–13	Oct 2013	Germany F19, Essen	Futures	Hard (i)	(Serbia) Miki Janković	(Germany) Andreas Mies (Germany) Oscar Otte	w/o
Win	18–13	Nov 2013	India F9, Delhi	Futures	Hard	(India) Ranjeet Virali-Murugesan	(India) Ramkumar Ramanathan (India) Ashwin Vijayragavan	7–6^{(7–3)}, 6–3
Win	19–13	Nov 2013	India F11, Raipur	Futures	Hard	(India) Ranjeet Virali-Murugesan	(India) Mohit Mayur Jayaprakash (India) Ramkumar Ramanathan	6–1, 6–3
Loss	19–14	Feb 2014	Chennai, India	Challenger	Hard	(Slovenia) Blaž Rola	(India) Yuki Bhambri (New Zealand) Michael Venus	4–6, 6–7^{(3–7)}
Win	20–14	Feb 2014	India F1, Chandigarh	Futures	Hard	(India) Ranjeet Virali-Murugesan	(India) Vivek Shokeen (India) Sanam Singh	6–4, 6–4
Loss	20–15	Mar 2014	India F2, Bhimavaram	Futures	Hard	(India) Ranjeet Virali-Murugesan	(India) Saketh Myneni (India) Sanam Singh	6–7^{(5–7)}, 3–6
Loss	20–16	Mar 2014	India F3, Chennai	Futures	Clay	(India) Ranjeet Virali-Murugesan	(India) Jeevan Nedunchezhiyan (India) Vishnu Vardhan	6–7^{(1–7)}, 3–6
Loss	20–17	Mar 2014	India F5, Madurai	Futures	Clay	(India) Ranjeet Virali-Murugesan	(Italy) Giorgio Portaluri (Sweden) Lucas Renard	4–6, 2–6
Win	21–17	Apr 2014	Uzbekistan F2, Namangan	Futures	Hard	(India) Ranjeet Virali-Murugesan	(Poland) Piotr Gadomski (India) Vishnu Vardhan	6–3, 6–1
Win	22–17	Aug 2014	Kazakhstan F10, Astana	Futures	Hard	(India) Ranjeet Virali-Murugesan	(Chinese Taipei) Huang Liang-chi (Russia) Denis Matsukevitch	6–2, 6–4
Loss	22–18	Aug 2014	Kazakhstan F11, Astana	Futures	Hard	(India) Ranjeet Virali-Murugesan	(Chinese Taipei) Chen Ti (Russia) Denis Matsukevitch	2–6, 3–6
Win	23–18	Sep 2014	Sweden F4, Danderyd	Futures	Hard (i)	(Sweden) Patrik Rosenholm	(Sweden) Jacob Adaktusson (Sweden) Tobias Blomgren	6–4, 6–4
Loss	23–19	Sep 2014	Sweden F5, Falun	Futures	Hard (i)	(Sweden) Patrik Rosenholm	(United Kingdom) Lewis Burton (United Kingdom) Edward Corrie	6–7^{(1–7)}, 1–6
Win	24–19	Nov 2014	India F6, Kolkata	Futures	Clay	(India) Ranjeet Virali-Murugesan	(India) Vijay Sundar Prashanth (India) Vishnu Vardhan	6–4, 6–2
Win	25–19	Dec 2014	Qatar F5, Doha	Futures	Hard	(India) Ramkumar Ramanathan	(Republic of Ireland) Sam Barry (Austria) Maximilian Neuchrist	6–3, 6–4
Win	26–19	Mar 2015	India F2, Bhimavaram	Futures	Hard	(India) Vishnu Vardhan	(India) Ramkumar Ramanathan (India) Ranjeet Virali-Murugesan	6–7^{(5–7)}, 6–3, [10–6]
Loss	26–20	Mar 2015	India F4, Chennai	Futures	Clay	(India) Ranjeet Virali-Murugesan	(India) Chandril Sood (India) Lakshit Sood	6–4, 5–7, [13–15]
Win	27–20	Jun 2015	India F9, Hyderabad	Futures	Hard (i)	(India) Vishnu Vardhan	(India) Bhavesh Gour (India) Sidharth Rawat	6–3, 6–0
Win	28–20	Jun 2015	India F10, Hyderabad	Futures	Hard (i)	(India) Vishnu Vardhan	(France) Antoine Escoffier (France) Hugo Grenier	6–4, 6–2
Win	29–20	Jul 2015	China F10, Xi'an	Futures	Hard	(China) Li Zhe	(China) Bai Yan (Chinese Taipei) Chen Ti	4–6, 7–6^{(7–2)}, [13–11]
Loss	29–21	Jul 2015	China F11, Xi'an	Futures	Hard	(China) Li Zhe	(China) Bai Yan (Chinese Taipei) Hsieh Cheng-peng	7–6^{(7–4)}, 3–6, [7–10]
Win	30–21	Nov 2015	India F16, Gwalior	Futures	Hard	(India) Vishnu Vardhan	(Chinese Taipei) Hung Jui-chen (India) Ramkumar Ramanathan	6–4, 7–6^{(7–5)}
Loss	30–22	Apr 2016	China F4, Zhangjiagang	Futures	Hard	(Japan) Shuichi Sekiguchi	(Chinese Taipei) Hsieh Cheng-peng (Chinese Taipei) Peng Hsien-yin	6–7^{(4–7)}, 3–6
Win	31–22	Apr 2016	India F1, Chandigarh	Futures	Hard	(India) Vishnu Vardhan	(Japan) Yuichi Ito (Japan) Sho Katayama	6–1, 6–4
Win	32–22	May 2016	India F3, Jassowal	Futures	Hard	(India) Vijay Sundar Prashanth	(United States) John Lamble (Portugal) Bernardo Saraiva	6–3, 6–3
Win	33–22	May 2016	Uzbekistan F3, Andijan	Futures	Hard	(Russia) Markos Kalovelonis	(Kazakhstan) Roman Khassanov (Russia) Vitaly Kozyukov	6–3, 6–4
Loss	33–23	Aug 2016	Indonesia F1, Jakarta	Futures	Hard	(India) Vishnu Vardhan	(Chinese Taipei) Huang Liang-chi (China) Wang Aoran	3–6, 6–4, [10–12]
Win	34–23	Sep 2016	Thailand F2, Hua Hin	Futures	Hard	(India) Vijay Sundar Prashanth	(Thailand) Pruchya Isaro (Japan) Ken Onishi	6–2, 6–2
Win	35–23	Sep 2016	India F4, Chennai	Futures	Clay	(India) Vijay Sundar Prashanth	(India) Kunal Anand (India) Anvit Bendre	7–6^{(7–2)}, 6–1
Win	36–23	Sep 2016	India F5, Chennai	Futures	Hard	(India) Vishnu Vardhan	(India) Kunal Anand (India) Anvit Bendre	6–3, 6–4
Win	37–23	Sep 2016	India F6, Coimbatore	Futures	Hard	(India) Vishnu Vardhan	(India) Anvit Bendre (India) Vijay Sundar Prashanth	6–3, 6–1
Loss	37–24	Nov 2016	Australia F10, Blacktown	Futures	Hard	(India) Sanam Singh	(Australia) Steven de Waard (United States) Jarmere Jenkins	4–6, 2–6
Win	38–24	Feb 2017	India F2, Jorhat	Futures	Hard	(India) Vishnu Vardhan	(India) Mohit Mayur Jayaprakash (India) Vijay Sundar Prashanth	7–6^{(7–5)}, 4–6, [10–6]
Win	39–24	Mar 2017	India F3, Guwahati	Futures	Hard	(India) Vishnu Vardhan	(India) Vijay Sundar Prashanth (India) Sanam Singh	6–3, 3–6, [10–6]
Win	40–24	Mar 2017	India F4, Bhilai	Futures	Hard	(India) Vishnu Vardhan	(United States) Alexander Centenari (Germany) Sami Reinwein	6–2, 6–4
Loss	40–25	Mar 2017	India F5, Bangalore	Futures	Hard	(India) Vishnu Vardhan	(India) Chandril Sood (India) Lakshit Sood	6–2, 4–6, [6–10]
Win	41–25	Mar 2017	India F6, Trivandrum	Futures	Clay	(India) Vishnu Vardhan	(Chinese Taipei) Hung Jui-chen (Hong Kong) Wong Hong-kit	6–3, 7–5
Win	42–25	Apr 2017	Uzbekistan F1, Bukhara	Futures	Hard	(India) Vishnu Vardhan	(Belarus) Sergey Betov (Ukraine) Vladyslav Manafov	6–4, 7–5
Loss	42–26	Apr 2017	Uzbekistan F2, Karshi	Futures	Hard	(India) Vishnu Vardhan	(Uzbekistan) Sanjar Fayziev (Kazakhstan) Timur Khabibulin	6–7^{(3–7)}, 3–6
Win	43–26	Jun 2017	Uzbekistan F3, Andijan	Futures	Hard	(India) Vishnu Vardhan	(Ukraine) Vladyslav Manafov (Russia) Denis Matsukevitch	6–3, 6–2
Win	44–26	Jun 2017	Fergana, Uzbekistan	Challenger	Hard	(India) Vishnu Vardhan	(Japan) Yuya Kibi (Japan) Shuichi Sekiguchi	6–3, 6–3
Loss	44–27	Jul 2017	Båstad, Sweden	Challenger	Clay	(India) Vijay Sundar Prashanth	(Turkey) Tuna Altuna (Czech Republic) Václav Šafránek	1–6, 4–6
Win	45–27	Aug 2017	Chengdu, China, P.R.	Challenger	Hard	(India) Vishnu Vardhan	(Chinese Taipei) Hsieh Cheng-peng (Chinese Taipei) Peng Hsien-yin	6–3, 6–4
Loss	45–28	Aug 2017	Jinan, China, P.R.	Challenger	Hard	(India) Vishnu Vardhan	(Chinese Taipei) Hsieh Cheng-peng (Chinese Taipei) Peng Hsien-yin	6–4, 4–6, [4–10]
Win	46–28	Nov 2017	Shenzhen, China, P.R.	Challenger	Hard	(India) Vishnu Vardhan	(United States) Austin Krajicek (United States) Jackson Withrow	7–6^{(7–3)}, 7–6^{(7–3)}
Win	47–28	Feb 2018	Chennai, India	Challenger	Hard	(India) Vishnu Vardhan	(Turkey) Cem İlkel (Serbia) Danilo Petrović	7–6^{(7–5)}, 5–7, [10–5]
Win	48–28	May 2018	Samarkand, Uzbekistan	Challenger	Clay	(India) Vishnu Vardhan	(Russia) Mikhail Elgin (Uzbekistan) Denis Istomin	w/o
Loss	48–29	Jul 2018	Braunschweig, Germany	Challenger	Clay	(India) Vishnu Vardhan	(Mexico) Santiago González (Netherlands) Wesley Koolhof	3–6, 3–6
Loss	48–30	Nov 2018	Shenzhen, China, P.R.	Challenger	Hard	(India) Jeevan Nedunchezhiyan	(Chinese Taipei) Hsieh Cheng-peng (Indonesia) Christopher Rungkat	4–6, 2–6
Loss	48–31	Mar 2019	Zhangjiagang, China, P.R.	Challenger	Hard	(Mexico) Hans Hach	(Australia) Max Purcell (Australia) Luke Saville	2–6, 6–7^{(5–7)}
Win	49–31	Apr 2019	Taipei, Chinese Taipei	Challenger	Hard (i)	(Israel) Jonathan Erlich	(Netherlands) Sander Arends (Austria) Tristan-Samuel Weissborn	6–3, 6–2
Loss	49–32	Aug 2019	Meerbusch, Germany	Challenger	Clay	(India) Vishnu Vardhan	(Germany) Andre Begemann (Romania) Florin Mergea	6–7^{(1–7)}, 7–6^{(7–4)}, [3–10]
Loss	49–33	Sep 2020	Prostějov, Czech Republic	Challenger	Clay	(India) Divij Sharan	(Czech Republic) Zdeněk Kolář (Czech Republic) Lukáš Rosol	2–6, 6–2, [6–10]
Win	50–33	Sep 2021	Cassis, France	Challenger	Hard	(India) Ramkumar Ramanathan	(Mexico) Hans Hach Verdugo (Mexico) Miguel Ángel Reyes-Varela	6–4, 3–6, [10–6]
Win	51–33	Jun 2022	Bratislava, Slovakia	Challenger	Clay	(India) Jeevan Nedunchezhiyan	(Ukraine) Vladyslav Manafov (Ukraine) Oleg Prihodko	7–6^{(8–6)}, 6–4
Win	52–33	Jun 2022	Blois, France	Challenger	Clay	(India) Jeevan Nedunchezhiyan	(Monaco) Romain Arneodo (France) Jonathan Eysseric	6–4, 6–7^{(3–7)}, [10–7]
Loss	52–34	May 2023	Skopje, North Macedonia	Challenger	Clay	(India) Jeevan Nedunchezhiyan	(Czech Republic) Petr Nouza (Czech Republic) Andrew Paulson	6–7^{(5–7)}, 3–6
Loss	52–35	Aug 2023	Mallorca, Spain	Challenger	Hard	(India) Ramkumar Ramanathan	(Israel) Daniel Cukierman (United Kingdom) Joshua Paris	4–6, 4–6
Loss	52–36	Sep 2023	Seville, Spain	Challenger	Clay	(Brazil) Fernando Romboli	(Spain) Alberto Barroso Campos (Spain) Pedro Mártinez	6–3, 6–7^{(5–7)}, [9–11]
Win	53–36	Oct 2023	Bratislava, Slovakia	Challenger	Hard	(Germany) Andre Begemann	(Kazakhstan) Andrey Golubev (Ukraine) Denys Molchanov	6–3, 5–7, [10–8]
Win	54–36	Oct 2023	Ismaning, Germany	Challenger	Carpet	(Germany) Andre Begemann	(Germany) Constantin Frantzen (Germany) Hendrik Jebens	7–6^{(7–4)}, 6–4
Win	55–36	Nov 2023	Helsinki, Germany	Challenger	Hard	(Germany) Andre Begemann	(India) Jeevan Nedunchezhiyan (India) Vijay Sundar Prashanth	6–2, 7–5
Win	56–36	Apr 2024	Cagliari, Italy	Challenger	Clay	(Germany) Andre Begemann	(Bolivia) Boris Arias (Bolivia) Federico Zeballos	6–4, 6–7^{(3–7)}, [10–6]
Loss	56–37	Jun 2024	Perugia, Italy	Challenger	Clay	(Germany) Andre Begemann	(Argentina) Guido Andreozzi (Mexico) Miguel Angel Reyes-Varela	4–6, 5–7
Loss	56–38	Jul 2024	Braunschweig, Germany	Challenger	Clay	(Ecuador) Gonzalo Escobar	(Netherlands) Sander Arends (Netherlands) Robin Haase	6–4, 4–6, [8–10]
Loss	56–39	Aug 2024	Santo Domingo, Dominican Republic	Challenger	Clay	(Brazil) Fernando Romboli	(Ecuador) Diego Hidalgo (Mexico) Miguel Ángel Reyes-Varela	7–6^{(7–2)}, 4–6, [16–18]
Loss	56–40	Sep 2024	Bad Waltersdorf, Austria	Challenger	Clay	(Argentina) Guido Andreozzi	(Czech Republic) Petr Nouza (Czech Republic) Patrik Rikl	4–6, 6–4, [5–10]
Win	57–40	Nov 2024	Rovereto, Italy	Challenger	Hard (i)	(India) Rithvik Choudary Bollipalli	(France) Théo Arribagé (Portugal) Francisco Cabral	6–2, 2–6, [12–10]
Loss	57–41	May 2025	Skopje, North Macedonia	Challenger	Clay	(Mexico) Miguel Ángel Reyes-Varela	(Czech Republic) Andrew Paulson (Czech Republic) Michael Vrbenský	6–2, 4–6, [6–10]
Loss	57–42	Aug 2025	Sumter, United States	Challenger	Hard	(India) Rithvik Choudary Bollipalli	(United States) Ryan Seggerman (United States) Patrik Trhac	4–6, 6–7^{(3–7)}
Loss	57–43	Nov 2025	Lyon, France	Challenger	Hard (i)	(Germany) Hendrik Jebens	(Ecuador) Diego Hidalgo (United States) Patrik Trhac	3–6, 4–6
Win	58–43	Jan 2026	Nonthaburi, Thailand	Challenger	Hard	(Austria) Neil Oberleitner	(India) Anirudh Chandrasekar (Japan) Takeru Yuzuki	6–3, 7–6^{(8–6)}
Win	59–43	Jan 2026	Manama, Bahrain	Challenger	Hard	(Austria) Neil Oberleitner	(United States) Vasil Kirkov (Netherlands) Bart Stevens	7–6^{(7–1)}, 6–4
Win	60–43	Feb 2026	Pau, France	Challenger	Hard (i)	(Austria) Neil Oberleitner	(Switzerland) Jakub Paul (Czech Republic) Matěj Vocel	1–6, 6–3, [13–11]
Win	61–43	Apr 2026	Oeiras, Portugal	Challenger	Clay	(Austria) Neil Oberleitner	(Colombia) Nicolás Barrientos (Uruguay) Ariel Behar	6–7^{(7–9)}, 6–4, [11–9]
Win	62–43	Aug 2026	Cancún, Mexico	Challenger	Hard	(India) Anirudh Chandrasekar	Ivan Liutarevich (Mexico) Miguel Ángel Reyes-Varela	6–3, 7–6^{(7–4)}
Loss	62–44	Oct 2026	Brest, France	Challenger	Hard (i)	(United States) Evan King	(Ecuador) Gonzalo Escobar (India) Niki Kaliyanda Poonacha	6–7^{(4–7)}, 7–6^{(7–5)}, [7–10]
