= Macedonian Open =

- 2025 Macedonian Open

ATP Challenger Tour
- Event name: Macedonian Open
- Location: Skopje, North Macedonia
- Venue: Tennis Club Jug
- Category: ATP Challenger Tour
- Surface: Clay

The Macedonian Open is a professional tennis tournament played on clay courts. It is currently part of the ATP Challenger Tour. It was first held in Skopje, North Macedonia in 2023.

== Past finals ==
=== Singles ===
Year	Champion	Runner-up	Score
2025	(United Kingdom) Jay Clarke	(Bosnia and Herzegovina) Nerman Fatić	6–2, 6–3
2024	(Austria) Joel Schwärzler	(Poland) Kamil Majchrzak	6–3, 6–3
2023	(Hungary) Máté Valkusz	(Argentina) Francisco Comesaña	6–3, 6–4

=== Doubles ===
Year	Champions	Runners-up	Score
2025	(Czech Republic) Andrew Paulson (Czech Republic) Michael Vrbenský	(India) Sriram Balaji (Mexico) Miguel Ángel Reyes-Varela	2–6, 6–4, [10–6]
2024	(United States) Ryan Seggerman (United States) Patrik Trhac	(Czech Republic) Andrew Paulson (Czech Republic) Patrik Rikl	6–3, 7–6^{(7–4)}
2023	(Czech Republic) Petr Nouza (Czech Republic) Andrew Paulson	(India) Sriram Balaji (India) Jeevan Nedunchezhiyan	7–6^{(7–5)}, 6–3
