= 2015 McDonald's Burnie International – Men's singles =

Men's singles
- 2015 McDonald's Burnie International

Final
- Champion: (South Korea) Chung Hyeon
- Runner-up: (Australia) Alex Bolt
- Score: 6–2, 7–5

Events
Singles	men	women
Doubles	men	women
← 2014 ·	Burnie International	· 2017 →

Matt Reid was the defending champion, but lost in the first round to Radu Albot.
Chung Hyeon won the title, defeating Alex Bolt in final, 6–2, 7–5.

== Seeds ==
1. (Australia) James Duckworth (second round)
2. (Japan) Yūichi Sugita (first round)
3. (India) Somdev Devvarman (first round)
4. (Japan) Hiroki Moriya (first round)
5. (United States) Bradley Klahn (first round)
6. (Australia) John Millman (first round)
7. (Australia) Luke Saville (first round)
8. (South Korea) Chung Hyeon (champion)

== Draw ==
=== Key ===
- Q = Qualifier
- WC = Wild card
- LL = Lucky loser
- Alt = Alternate
- ITF = ITF entry
- PR = Protected ranking
- SR = Special ranking
- SE = Special exempt
- JE = Junior exempt
- JR = Junior Accelerator Programme entrant
- CO = College Accelerator Programme entrant
- NG = Next Gen Accelerator Program entrant
- w/o = Walkover
- r = Retired
- d = Defaulted

=== Finals ===
Semifinals
(Australia) Benjamin Mitchell	6	1	6^{3}
(Australia) Alex Bolt	4	6	7^{7}
8	(South Korea) Chung Hyeon	6	6^{4}	6
LL	(Australia) Matthew Barton	2	7^{7}	3

Final
(Australia) Alex Bolt	2	5
8	(South Korea) Chung Hyeon	6	7

=== Top half ===
First round
1	(Australia) J Duckworth	6	6
Q	(Australia) C O'Connell	2	4
(Australia) B Mitchell	6	6
Q	(Greece) S Tsitsipas	2	2
(Australia) J Thompson	6	1	4
(Russia) R Safiullin	3	6	6
(China) Z Zhang	5	6	2
6	(Australia) J Millman	7	2	1^{r}
3	(India) S Devvarman	6	6^{3}	4
Q	(New Zealand) F Tearney	1	7^{7}	6
(United States) B Fratangelo	6	1	7^{13}
(Japan) T Niki	4	6	6^{11}
WC	(Australia) O Jasika	1	4
PR	(United States) T Sandgren	6	6
(Australia) A Bolt	6	7^{7}
5	(United States) B Klahn	4	6^{3}

Second round
1	(Australia) J Duckworth	4	6	5
(Australia) B Mitchell	6	3	7
(Russia) R Safiullin	0^{r}
(China) Z Zhang	1
Q	(New Zealand) F Tearney	4	3
(United States) B Fratangelo	6	6
PR	(United States) T Sandgren	6^{6}	4
(Australia) A Bolt	7^{8}	6

Quarterfinals
(Australia) B Mitchell	6	6
(China) Z Zhang	2	0
(United States) B Fratangelo	3	2
(Australia) A Bolt	6	6

Semifinals
(Australia) B Mitchell	6	1	6^{3}
(Australia) A Bolt	4	6	7^{7}

=== Bottom half ===
First round
8	(South Korea) H Chung	7	6
WC	(Australia) B Mott	5	4
(Moldova) R Albot	4	6	7^{7}
(Australia) M Reid	6	3	6^{5}
(United Kingdom) K Edmund	6	7
WC	(Australia) H Bourchier	3	5
(Australia) M Banes	6	3	6
4	(Japan) H Moriya	3	6	1
7	(Australia) L Saville	3	4
LL	(Australia) M Barton	6	6
Q	(Australia) A Whittington	2	1
(United Kingdom) B Klein	6	6
(China) D Wu	6^{5}	1
WC	(United States) M Krueger	7^{7}	6
(Australia) M Ebden	6	6
2	(Japan) Y Sugita	2	3

Second round
8	(South Korea) H Chung	6	6
(Moldova) R Albot	3	3
(United Kingdom) K Edmund	6	6^{3}	7
(Australia) M Banes	1	7^{7}	5
LL	(Australia) M Barton	4	6	6
(United Kingdom) B Klein	6	3	4
WC	(United States) M Krueger	6^{3}	6^{4}
(Australia) M Ebden	7^{7}	7^{7}

Quarterfinals
8	(South Korea) H Chung	6	6
(United Kingdom) K Edmund	3	2
LL	(Australia) M Barton	6	6
(Australia) M Ebden	2	4

Semifinals
8	(South Korea) H Chung	6	6^{4}	6
LL	(Australia) M Barton	2	7^{7}	3
