= 2015 McDonald's Burnie International =

- Date: 2–8 February
- Edition: 13th (men); 7th (women)
- Category: ATP Challenger Tour (men); ITF Women's Circuit (women)
- Prize money: $50,000
- Surface: Hard
- Location: Burnie, Tasmania, Australia
- Venue: Burnie Tennis Club

Champions

Men's singles
- (South Korea) Chung Hyeon

Women's singles
- (Russia) Daria Gavrilova

Men's doubles
- (Australia) Carsten Ball / (Australia) Matt Reid

Women's doubles
- (United States) Irina Falconi / (Croatia) Petra Martić
← 2014 ·	Burnie International	· 2017 →

The 2015 McDonald's Burnie International was a professional tennis tournament played on outdoor hard courts. It was the thirteenth (for men) and seventh (for women) edition of the tournament which is part of the 2015 ATP Challenger Tour and the 2015 ITF Women's Circuit, offering a total of $50,000 in prize money for both genders. It took place in Burnie, Tasmania, Australia, on 2–8 February 2015.

== Men's singles entrants ==
=== Seeds ===
Country	Player	Rank^{1}	Seed
AUS	James Duckworth	119	1
JPN	Yūichi Sugita	135	2
IND	Somdev Devvarman	139	3
JPN	Hiroki Moriya	146	4
USA	Bradley Klahn	150	5
AUS	John Millman	151	6
AUS	Luke Saville	164	7
KOR	Hyeon Chung	169	8

- ^{1} Rankings as of 12 January 2015

=== Other entrants ===
The following players received wildcards into the singles main draw:

- (Australia) Harry Bourchier
- (Australia) Maverick Banes
- (Australia) Omar Jasika
- (United States) Mitchell Krueger

The following player received entry with a protected ranking:

- (United States) Tennys Sandgren

The following players received entry from the qualifying draw:

- (Greece) Stefanos Tsitsipas
- (New Zealand) Finn Tearney
- (Australia) Christopher O'Connell
- (Australia) Andrew Whittington

The following player received entry as a lucky loser:

- (Australia) Matthew Barton

== Women's singles entrants ==
=== Seeds ===
Country	Player	Rank^{1}	Seed
USA	Irina Falconi	111	1
JPN	Misa Eguchi	121	2
RUS	Daria Gavrilova	158	3
JPN	Risa Ozaki	162	4
POL	Katarzyna Piter	177	5
CZE	Andrea Hlaváčková	178	6
LUX	Mandy Minella	179	7
CHN	Wang Yafan	180	8

- ^{1} Rankings as of 19 January 2015

=== Other entrants ===
The following players received wildcards into the singles main draw:

- (Australia) Destanee Aiava
- (Australia) Seone Mendez
- (Australia) Tammi Patterson
- (Australia) Storm Sanders

The following players received entry from the qualifying draw:

- (Australia) Alison Bai
- (United States) Alexa Glatch
- (Australia) Viktorija Rajicic
- (China) Xu Shilin

The following player received entry by a junior exempt:

- (Switzerland) Jil Teichmann

== Champions ==
=== Men's singles ===
- (South Korea) Chung Hyeon def. (Australia) Alex Bolt, 6–2, 7–5

=== Women's singles ===
- (Russia) Daria Gavrilova def. (United States) Irina Falconi, 7–5, 7–5

=== Men's doubles ===
- (Australia) Carsten Ball / (Australia) Matt Reid def. (Moldova) Radu Albot / (Australia) Matthew Ebden, 7–5, 6–4

=== Women's doubles ===
- (United States) Irina Falconi / (Croatia) Petra Martić def. (China) Han Xinyun / (Japan) Junri Namigata, 6–2, 6–4
