= 2015 McDonald's Burnie International – Men's doubles =

Men's doubles
- 2015 McDonald's Burnie International

Final
- Champions: (Australia) Carsten Ball (Australia) Matt Reid
- Runners-up: (Moldova) Radu Albot (Australia) Matthew Ebden
- Score: 7–5, 6–4

Events
Singles	men	women
Doubles	men	women
← 2014 ·	Burnie International	· 2017 →

Matt Reid and John-Patrick Smith were the defending champions but Smith decided not to participate.
Reid played alongside Carsten Ball and won the title, defeating Radu Albot and Matthew Ebden, 7–5, 6–4.

== Seeds ==
1. (Australia) Alex Bolt / (Australia) Andrew Whittington (semifinals)
2. (Moldova) Radu Albot / (Australia) Matthew Ebden (final)
3. (United Kingdom) Brydan Klein / (Chinese Taipei) Lee Hsin-han (quarterfinals)
4. (India) Somdev Devvarman / (India) Sanam Singh (semifinals)

== Draw ==
=== Key ===
- Q = Qualifier
- WC = Wild card
- LL = Lucky loser
- Alt = Alternate
- SE = Special exempt
- PR = Protected ranking
- ITF = ITF entry
- JE = Junior exempt
- w/o = Walkover
- r = Retired
- d = Defaulted
- SR = Special ranking

First round
1	(Australia) A Bolt (Australia) A Whittington	7	6^{4}	[10]
(Australia) B Mitchell (Australia) J Thompson	5	7^{7}	[6]
WC	(Australia) O Jasika (Australia) B Mott	5	6^{1}
(Australia) A Hubble (New Zealand) J Statham	7	7^{7}
3	(United Kingdom) B Klein (Chinese Taipei) H-h Lee	6	7
(Australia) J Duckworth (Australia) L Saville	4	5
WC	(Australia) M Barton (Australia) C O'Connell	4	7^{7}	[8]
(Australia) C Ball (Australia) M Reid	6	6^{3}	[10]
(United States) M Krueger (Japan) T Niki	3	0
WC	(Australia) H Bourchier (Australia) M Polmans	6	6
(Australia) M Banes (Australia) Gavin van Peperzeel	2	2
4	(India) S Devvarman (India) S Singh	6	6
(United States) B Fratangelo (United States) T Sandgren	6	7^{7}
(Japan) H Moriya (China) Z Zhang	4	6^{5}
(Japan) Yuya Kibi (Japan) Y Sugita	2	3
2	(Moldova) R Albot (Australia) M Ebden	6	6

Quarterfinals
1	(Australia) A Bolt (Australia) A Whittington	6	6
(Australia) A Hubble (New Zealand) J Statham	3	0
3	(United Kingdom) B Klein (Chinese Taipei) H-h Lee	6	6^{10}	[8]
(Australia) C Ball (Australia) M Reid	4	7^{12}	[10]
WC	(Australia) H Bourchier (Australia) M Polmans	1	7^{7}	[6]
4	(India) S Devvarman (India) S Singh	6	6^{4}	[10]
(United States) B Fratangelo (United States) T Sandgren	6	4	[12]
2	(Moldova) R Albot (Australia) M Ebden	4	6	[14]

Semifinals
1	(Australia) A Bolt (Australia) A Whittington	6^{4}	3
(Australia) C Ball (Australia) M Reid	7^{7}	6
4	(India) S Devvarman (India) S Singh	3	6	[8]
2	(Moldova) R Albot (Australia) M Ebden	6	4	[10]

Final
(Australia) C Ball (Australia) M Reid	7	6
2	(Moldova) R Albot (Australia) M Ebden	5	4
