= 2016 Launceston Tennis International – Men's singles =

Men's singles
- 2016 Launceston Tennis International

Final
- Champion: (Australia) Blake Mott
- Runner-up: (Kazakhstan) Andrey Golubev
- Score: 6–7^{(4–7)} , 6–1 , 6–2

Events
Singles	men	women
Doubles	men	women
- Launceston Tennis International

Bjorn Fratangelo is the defending champion, but did not compete, choosing to play in the RBC Tennis Championships of Dallas instead.

Blake Mott won the title, defeating Andrey Golubev in the final 6–7^{(4–7)} , 6–1, 6–2

== Seeds ==
1. (Australia) James Duckworth (withdrew)
2. (Australia) Jordan Thompson (first round)
3. (India) Saketh Myneni (semifinals)
4. (United States) Alexander Sarkissian (second round)
5. (Italy) Matteo Donati (first round)
6. (United Kingdom) Brydan Klein (first round, retired)
7. (Australia) Luke Saville (semifinals)
8. (Kazakhstan) Andrey Golubev (final)
9. (France) Stéphane Robert (quarterfinals)

== Draw ==
Key

- Q = Qualifier
- WC = Wild card
- LL = Lucky loser
- Alt = Alternate
- ITF = ITF entry
- PR = Protected ranking
- SR = Special ranking
- SE = Special exempt
- JE = Junior exempt
- JR = Junior Accelerator Programme entrant
- CO = College Accelerator Programme entrant
- NG = Next Gen Accelerator Program entrant
- w/o = Walkover
- r = Retired
- d = Defaulted

=== Finals ===
Semifinals
WC	(Australia) Blake Mott	6	6
3	(India) Saketh Myneni	1	4
7	(Australia) Luke Saville	3	6^{2}
8	(Kazakhstan) Andrey Golubev	6	7^{7}

Final
WC	(Australia) Blake Mott	6^{4}	6	6
8	(Kazakhstan) Andrey Golubev	7^{7}	1	2

=== Top half ===
First round
9	(France) S Robert	7^{7}	6
(Australia) M Banes	6^{2}	1
Q	(New Zealand) J Statham	2	6^{3}
(South Korea) D-h Lee	6	7^{7}
WC	(Australia) B Mott	4	6	6
Q	(Australia) T Fancutt	6	0	2
Q	(Greece) S Tsitsipas	3	7	4
6	(United Kingdom) B Klein	6	5	2^{r}
3	(India) S Myneni	7^{7}	6^{6}	6
Q	(Australia) M Polmans	6^{4}	7^{8}	3
(Canada) F Peliwo	6	6
(New Zealand) F Tearney	2	3
LL	(Australia) Jarryd Chaplin	6	7
WC	(Australia) A Popyrin	2	5
(Australia) B Mitchell	6	6
5	(Italy) M Donati	2	3

Second round
9	(France) S Robert	6	6
(South Korea) D-h Lee	4	1
WC	(Australia) B Mott	6	6
Q	(Greece) S Tsitsipas	1	4
3	(India) S Myneni	7	5	6
(Canada) F Peliwo	5	7	3
LL	(Australia) J Chaplin	4	2
(Australia) B Mitchell	6	6

Quarterfinals
9	(France) S Robert	3	6^{6}
WC	(Australia) B Mott	6	7^{8}
3	(India) S Myneni	6	6
(Australia) B Mitchell	4	2

Semifinals
WC	(Australia) B Mott	6	6
3	(India) S Myneni	1	4

=== Bottom half ===
First round
7	(Australia) L Saville	6	6
WC	(Australia) H Bourchier	4	4
(Australia) A Whittington	7^{7}	6^{5}	4
WC	(Australia) M Purcell	6^{4}	7^{7}	6
(Australia) A Bolt	6	6
(Japan) Shuichi Sekiguchi	3	4
(Australia) M Reid	7^{7}	4	3
4	(United States) A Sarkissian	6^{4}	6	6
8	(Kazakhstan) A Golubev	6	6
(Australia) Gavin van Peperzeel	2	4
(Japan) T Niki	7^{7}	6
(Australia) D Kelly	6^{5}	1
(Australia) O Jasika	6	6
(Japan) K Takeuchi	3	2
(Australia) M Barton	7	6^{5}	6
2	(Australia) J Thompson	5	7^{7}	4

Second round
7	(Australia) L Saville	6	4	6
WC	(Australia) M Purcell	4	6	1
(Australia) A Bolt	6	6^{3}	6
4	(United States) A Sarkissian	3	7^{7}	3
8	(Kazakhstan) A Golubev	6	6
(Japan) T Niki	1	3
(Australia) O Jasika	2	6	3
(Australia) M Barton	6	3	6

Quarterfinals
7	(Australia) L Saville	6	7^{7}
(Australia) A Bolt	3	6^{2}
8	(Kazakhstan) A Golubev	6	3	6
(Australia) M Barton	4	6	3

Semifinals
7	(Australia) L Saville	3	6^{2}
8	(Kazakhstan) A Golubev	6	7^{7}
