= 2017 City of Onkaparinga ATP Challenger – Singles =

Singles
- 2017 City of Onkaparinga ATP Challenger

Final
- Champion: (Germany) Peter Gojowczyk
- Runner-up: (Australia) Omar Jasika
- Score: 6–3, 6–1

Events
Singles	Doubles
← 2016 ·	City of Onkaparinga ATP Challenger	· 2018 →

Taylor Fritz was the defending champion but chose not to defend his title.

Peter Gojowczyk won the title after defeating Omar Jasika 6–3, 6–1 in the final.

== Seeds ==
1. (United States) Donald Young (first round)
2. (Brazil) João Souza (first round)
3. (United States) Denis Kudla (semifinals)
4. (Canada) Peter Polansky (quarterfinals)
5. (Slovakia) Norbert Gombos (first round)
6. (Barbados) Darian King (quarterfinals)
7. (Slovenia) Grega Žemlja (first round)
8. (Hungary) Márton Fucsovics (quarterfinals)

== Draw ==
=== Key ===
- Q = Qualifier
- WC = Wild card
- LL = Lucky loser
- Alt = Alternate
- ITF = ITF entry
- PR = Protected ranking
- SR = Special ranking
- SE = Special exempt
- JE = Junior exempt
- JR = Junior Accelerator Programme entrant
- CO = College Accelerator Programme entrant
- NG = Next Gen Accelerator Program entrant
- w/o = Walkover
- r = Retired
- d = Defaulted

=== Finals ===
Semifinals
(Germany) Peter Gojowczyk	6	6
3	(United States) Denis Kudla	4	2
WC	(Australia) Omar Jasika	6	4	7^{7}
(Belgium) Joris De Loore	4	6	6^{3}

Final
(Germany) Peter Gojowczyk	6	6
WC	(Australia) Omar Jasika	3	1

=== Top half ===
First round
1	(United States) D Young	4	6	6^{3}
(Belgium) R Bemelmans	6	2	7^{7}
(Republic of Ireland) J McGee	0	4
Q	(Japan) Y Uchiyama	6	6
(Germany) P Gojowczyk	6	6
(Serbia) M Tepavac	4	4
(United States) M Mmoh	6	6
7	(Slovenia) G Žemlja	2	4
3	(United States) D Kudla	2	6	6
(Belarus) U Ignatik	6	4	4
Q	(Kazakhstan) A Bublik	6	2	3
(Belgium) K Coppejans	3	6	6
Q	(Australia) L Saville	4	6	6
WC	(Australia) M Purcell	6	3	3
(United States) A Sarkissian	4	4
6	(Barbados) D King	6	6

Second round
(Belgium) R Bemelmans	6	6
Q	(Japan) Y Uchiyama	3	0
(Germany) P Gojowczyk	6	6
(United States) M Mmoh	2	3
3	(United States) D Kudla	6	6
(Belgium) K Coppejans	2	2
Q	(Australia) L Saville	6	6^{6}	2
6	(Barbados) D King	4	7^{8}	6

Quarterfinals
(Belgium) R Bemelmans	6^{6}	4
(Germany) P Gojowczyk	7^{8}	6
3	(United States) D Kudla	6	7^{7}
6	(Barbados) D King	2	6^{4}

Semifinals
(Germany) P Gojowczyk	6	6
3	(United States) D Kudla	4	2

=== Bottom half ===
First round
5	(Slovakia) N Gombos	2	7^{9}	5
WC	(Australia) O Jasika	6	6^{7}	7
(Japan) T Ito	3	2
Q	(Australia) A Bolt	6	6
(Australia) B Mott	6^{4}	7^{7}	4
(Germany) D Brands	7^{7}	6^{5}	6
WC	(Australia) M Polmans	1	6	4
4	(Canada) P Polansky	6	4	6
8	(Hungary) M Fucsovics	6	3	6
(El Salvador) M Arévalo	1	6	3
(Belarus) I Ivashka	6	6
(Czech Republic) J Šátral	3	4
(Belgium) J De Loore	6	6
(Serbia) L Đere	2	3
PR	(Germany) M Bachinger	6^{5}	6	6
2	(Brazil) J Souza	7^{7}	4	3

Second round
WC	(Australia) O Jasika	6	6
Q	(Australia) A Bolt	3	3
(Germany) D Brands	6^{3}	4
4	(Canada) P Polansky	7^{7}	6
8	(Hungary) M Fucsovics	6	6
(Belarus) I Ivashka	3	3
(Belgium) J De Loore	6	6
PR	(Germany) M Bachinger	2	4

Quarterfinals
WC	(Australia) O Jasika	6	6
4	(Canada) P Polansky	4	2
8	(Hungary) M Fucsovics	6^{6}	3
(Belgium) J De Loore	7^{8}	6

Semifinals
WC	(Australia) O Jasika	6	4	7^{7}
(Belgium) J De Loore	4	6	6^{3}
