= 2017 City of Onkaparinga ATP Challenger – Doubles =

Doubles
- 2017 City of Onkaparinga ATP Challenger

Final
- Champions: (Chile) Hans Podlipnik (United States) Max Schnur
- Runners-up: (Australia) Steven de Waard (Australia) Marc Polmans
- Score: 7–6^{(7–5)}, 4–6, [10–6]

Events
Singles	Doubles
← 2016 ·	City of Onkaparinga ATP Challenger	· 2018 →

Matteo Donati and Andrey Golubev were the defending champions but only Golubev chose to defend his title, partnering Uladzimir Ignatik. Golubev lost in the first round to Marinko Matosevic and Bradley Mousley.

Hans Podlipnik and Max Schnur won the title after defeating Steven de Waard and Marc Polmans 7–6^{(7–5)}, 4–6, [10–6] in the final.

== Seeds ==
1. (Chile) Hans Podlipnik / (United States) Max Schnur (champions)
2. (Canada) Peter Polansky / (United States) Donald Young (quarterfinals)
3. (Australia) Jarryd Chaplin / (Australia) Luke Saville (quarterfinals)
4. (El Salvador) Marcelo Arévalo / (Brazil) João Souza (semifinals)

== Draw ==
=== Key ===
- Q = Qualifier
- WC = Wild card
- LL = Lucky loser
- Alt = Alternate
- SE = Special exempt
- PR = Protected ranking
- ITF = ITF entry
- JE = Junior exempt
- w/o = Walkover
- r = Retired
- d = Defaulted
- SR = Special ranking

First round
1	(Chile) H Podlipnik (United States) M Schnur	6	7^{7}
(Japan) T Ito (Republic of Ireland) J McGee	4	6^{4}
(Kazakhstan) A Golubev (Belarus) U Ignatik	7^{8}	4	[5]
WC	(Australia) M Matosevic (Australia) B Mousley	6^{6}	6	[10]
4	(El Salvador) M Arévalo (Brazil) J Souza	6	2	[10]
WC	(Australia) H Bourchier (Australia) M Purcell	2	6	[6]
(Belgium) K Coppejans (Hungary) M Fucsovics	6^{1}	3
(Slovakia) N Gombos (Czech Republic) J Šátral	7^{7}	6
(Australia) S de Waard (Australia) M Polmans	7^{9}	6
(Germany) P Gojowczyk (Slovenia) G Žemlja	6^{7}	1
WC	(Australia) A Bolt (Australia) B Mott	6^{3}	3
3	(Australia) Jarryd Chaplin (Australia) L Saville	7^{7}	6
(Barbados) D King (United States) D Kudla	6	6
(Serbia) L Đere (Serbia) M Tepavac	4	4
(Belgium) R Bemelmans (Belgium) J De Loore	3	2
2	(Canada) P Polansky (United States) D Young	6	6

Quarterfinals
1	(Chile) H Podlipnik (United States) M Schnur	6	7^{10}
WC	(Australia) M Matosevic (Australia) B Mousley	3	6^{8}
4	(El Salvador) M Arévalo (Brazil) J Souza	w/o
(Slovakia) N Gombos (Czech Republic) J Šátral
(Australia) S de Waard (Australia) M Polmans	4	6	[10]
3	(Australia) J Chaplin (Australia) L Saville	6	1	[7]
(Barbados) D King (United States) D Kudla	w/o
2	(Canada) P Polansky (United States) D Young

Semifinals
1	(Chile) H Podlipnik (United States) M Schnur	6	6
4	(El Salvador) M Arévalo (Brazil) J Souza	4	3
(Australia) S de Waard (Australia) M Polmans	6	6
(Barbados) D King (United States) D Kudla	1	2

Final
1	(Chile) H Podlipnik (United States) M Schnur	7^{7}	4	[10]
(Australia) S de Waard (Australia) M Polmans	6^{5}	6	[6]
