= 2016 Launceston Tennis International =

- Date: 1–8 February
- Edition: 2nd (men); 5th (women)
- Category: ATP Challenger Tour (men); ITF Women's Circuit (women)
- Prize money: $75,000
- Surface: Hard
- Location: Launceston, Tasmania, Australia
- Venue: Launceston Regional Tennis Centre

Champions

Men's singles
- (Australia) Blake Mott

Women's singles
- (China) Han Xinyun

Men's doubles
- (Australia) Luke Saville / (Australia) Jordan Thompson

Women's doubles
- (China) You Xiaodi / (China) Zhu Lin
- Launceston Tennis International

The 2016 Launceston Tennis International was a professional tennis tournament played on outdoor hard courts. It was the second edition (for men) and fifth edition (for women) of the tournament which was part of the 2016 ATP Challenger Tour and the 2016 ITF Women's Circuit, offering a total of $75,000 in prize money for both genders. It took place in Launceston, Tasmania, Australia, on 1–8 February 2016.

== Men's singles entrants ==
=== Seeds ===
Country	Player	Rank^{1}	Seed
~~AUS~~	~~James Duckworth~~	~~129~~	~~1~~
AUS	Jordan Thompson	143	2
IND	Saketh Myneni	169	3
USA	Alexander Sarkissian	176	4
ITA	Matteo Donati	181	5
GBR	Brydan Klein	189	6
AUS	Luke Saville	191	7
KAZ	Andrey Golubev	204	8
FRA	Stéphane Robert	165	9

- ^{1} Rankings as of 18 January 2016.

=== Other entrants ===
The following players received wildcards into the singles main draw:

- (Australia) Harry Bourchier
- (Australia) Blake Mott
- (Australia) Alexei Popyrin
- (Australia) Max Purcell

The following player received entry into the singles main draw as a lucky loser:

- (Australia) Jarryd Chaplin

The following players received entry from the qualifying draw:

- (Australia) Thomas Fancutt
- (Australia) Marc Polmans
- (New Zealand) José Statham
- (Greece) Stefanos Tsitsipas

== Women's singles entrants ==
=== Seeds ===
Country	Player	Rank^{1}	Seed
CRO	Donna Vekić	104	1
JPN	Risa Ozaki	145	2
CHN	Zhang Kailin	152	3
CHN	Han Xinyun	162	4
LUX	Mandy Minella	171	5
CHN	Yang Zhaoxuan	178	6
JPN	Hiroko Kuwata	186	7
CHN	Zhu Lin	192	8

- ^{1} Rankings as of 18 January 2016.

=== Other entrants ===
The following players received wildcards into the singles main draw:

- (Australia) Naiktha Bains
- (Australia) Abbie Myers
- (Australia) Tammi Patterson
- (Ukraine) Dayana Yastremska

The following players received entry from the qualifying draw:

- (Australia) Lizette Cabrera
- (United States) Jennifer Elie
- (United States) Sabrina Santamaria
- (Slovakia) Zuzana Zlochová

The following player received entry by a protected ranking:

- (Japan) Miharu Imanishi

== Champions ==
=== Men's singles ===
- (Australia) Blake Mott def. (Kazakhstan) Andrey Golubev 6–7^{(4–7)}, 6–1, 6–2

=== Women's singles ===
- (China) Han Xinyun def. (Russia) Alla Kudryavtseva 6–1, 6–1

=== Men's doubles ===
- (Australia) Luke Saville / (Australia) Jordan Thompson def. (Australia) Dayne Kelly / (Australia) Matt Reid 6–1, 4–6, [13–11]

=== Women's doubles ===
- (China) You Xiaodi / (China) Zhu Lin def. (Ukraine) Nadiia Kichenok / (Luxembourg) Mandy Minella 2–6, 7–5, [10–7]
