= 2016 Canberra Challenger – Singles =

Singles
- 2016 Canberra Challenger
- 2015 Champion: Benjamin Mitchell

Final
- Champion: (Italy) Paolo Lorenzi
- Runner-up: (Croatia) Ivan Dodig
- Score: 6–2, 6–4

Events
Singles	Doubles
- Canberra Challenger

Top seed Paolo Lorenzi won his 17th career ATP Challenger Tour title, beating Ivan Dodig 6–2, 6–4

== Seeds ==
1. (Italy) Paolo Lorenzi (champion)
2. (Colombia) Santiago Giraldo (quarterfinals)
3. (Spain) Daniel Muñoz de la Nava (semifinals)
4. (Spain) Marcel Granollers (semifinals)
5. (Croatia) Ivan Dodig (final)
6. (Argentina) Diego Schwartzman (quarterfinals, retired)
7. (Russia) Evgeny Donskoy (quarterfinals)
8. (Japan) Taro Daniel (first round)

== Draw ==
Key

- Q = Qualifier
- WC = Wild card
- LL = Lucky loser
- Alt = Alternate
- ITF = ITF entry
- PR = Protected ranking
- SR = Special ranking
- SE = Special exempt
- JE = Junior exempt
- JR = Junior Accelerator Programme entrant
- CO = College Accelerator Programme entrant
- NG = Next Gen Accelerator Program entrant
- w/o = Walkover
- r = Retired
- d = Defaulted

=== Finals ===
Semifinals
1	(Italy) Paolo Lorenzi	7	6^{0}	7
4	(Spain) Marcel Granollers	5	7^{7}	5
3	(Spain) Daniel Muñoz de la Nava	1	3
5	(Croatia) Ivan Dodig	6	6

Final
1	(Italy) Paolo Lorenzi	6	6
5	(Croatia) Ivan Dodig	2	4

=== Top half ===
First round
1	(Italy) P Lorenzi	6	6
(Italy) S Napolitano	4	4
(Japan) Y Nishioka	3	6	6
(Australia) Jarryd Chaplin	6	1	4
(United States) N Rubin	6^{0}	6	6
WC	(Australia) A De Minaur	7^{7}	2	4
Q	(Australia) Daniel Nolan	1	1
7	(Russia) E Donskoy	6	6
4	(Spain) M Granollers	7^{7}	6
(Australia) B Mott	6^{5}	3
(Australia) M Banes	6	6
(Greece) S Tsitsipas	3	4
(Georgia (country)) N Basilashvili	5	7^{7}	2
(Australia) A Whittington	7	6^{1}	6
(France) Q Halys	4	7	7^{7}
8	(Japan) T Daniel	6	5	6^{5}

Second round
1	(Italy) P Lorenzi	7	6
(Japan) Y Nishioka	5	1
(United States) N Rubin	6	2	0
7	(Russia) E Donskoy	1	6	6
4	(Spain) M Granollers	6	6
(Australia) M Banes	4	3
(Australia) A Whittington	6	6^{5}	4
(France) Q Halys	3	7^{7}	6

Quarterfinals
1	(Italy) P Lorenzi	6	6
7	(Russia) E Donskoy	4	1
4	(Spain) M Granollers	6
(France) Q Halys	3^{r}

Semifinals
1	(Italy) P Lorenzi	7	6^{0}	7
4	(Spain) M Granollers	5	7^{7}	5

=== Bottom half ===
First round
6	(Argentina) D Schwartzman	6	6
WC	(Australia) A Popyrin	3	2
Q	(Germany) F Moser	6	6
Q	(Australia) S de Waard	4	3
(China) X Gao	6	6
(Japan) Hiroyasu Ehara	1	2
Q	(Belarus) S Betov	4	3
3	(Spain) D Muñoz de la Nava	6	6
5	(Croatia) I Dodig	7^{7}	6
(Australia) D Kelly	6^{5}	4
(Spain) D Gimeno-Traver	6	6^{5}	6
(Australia) M Ebden	2	7^{7}	1
WC	(Australia) Daniel Hobart	1	4
WC	(Australia) M Purcell	6	6
(Israel) D Sela	3	3
2	(Colombia) S Giraldo	6	6

Second round
6	(Argentina) D Schwartzman	6	7^{7}
Q	(Germany) F Moser	4	6^{4}
(China) X Gao	6^{3}	3
3	(Spain) D Muñoz de la Nava	7^{7}	6
5	(Croatia) I Dodig	6	6
(Spain) D Gimeno-Traver	3	2
WC	(Australia) M Purcell	2	7^{7}	3
2	(Colombia) S Giraldo	6	6^{5}	6

Quarterfinals
6	(Argentina) D Schwartzman	4^{r}
3	(Spain) D Muñoz de la Nava	6
5	(Croatia) I Dodig	7^{7}	6
2	(Colombia) S Giraldo	6^{1}	3

Semifinals
3	(Spain) D Muñoz de la Nava	1	3
5	(Croatia) I Dodig	6	6
