= 2017 Burnie International – Men's doubles =

Men's doubles
- 2017 Burnie International

Final
- Champions: (United Kingdom) Brydan Klein (Australia) Dane Propoggia
- Runners-up: (Australia) Steven de Waard (Australia) Luke Saville
- Score: 6–3, 6–4

Events
Singles	men	women
Doubles	men	women
- Burnie International

Carsten Ball and Matt Reid were the defending champions but chose not to defend their title.

Brydan Klein and Dane Propoggia won the title after defeating Steven de Waard and Luke Saville 6–3, 6–4 in the final.

== Seeds ==
1. (Australia) Steven de Waard / (Australia) Luke Saville (final)
2. (Australia) Jarryd Chaplin / (New Zealand) Ben McLachlan (semifinals)
3. (Japan) Toshihide Matsui / (Chinese Taipei) Yang Tsung-hua (first round)
4. (Switzerland) Luca Margaroli / (Egypt) Mohamed Safwat (quarterfinals)

== Draw ==
Key

- Q = Qualifier
- WC = Wild card
- LL = Lucky loser
- Alt = Alternate
- ITF = ITF entry
- PR = Protected ranking
- SR = Special ranking
- SE = Special exempt
- JE = Junior exempt
- JR = Junior Accelerator Programme entrant
- CO = College Accelerator Programme entrant
- NG = Next Gen Accelerator Program entrant
- w/o = Walkover
- r = Retired
- d = Defaulted

First round
1	(Australia) S de Waard (Australia) L Saville	6	6
WC	(Australia) J Delaney (Australia) M Purcell	4	3
(Japan) Yuya Kibi (Japan) T Niki	6	6^{4}	[3]
(Australia) A Bolt (Australia) A Whittington	3	7^{7}	[10]
4	(Switzerland) L Margaroli (Egypt) M Safwat	3	6	[10]
PR	(United States) JP Fruttero (United States) E King	6	4	[3]
(United States) M Krueger (United States) N Rubin	6^{4}	6	[7]
(Italy) R Bellotti (Slovenia) B Rola	7^{7}	3	[10]
(Australia) B Mousley (Japan) A Santillan	6	5	[10]
WC	(Australia) M Barton (Australia) M Ebden	4	7	[4]
PR	(United Kingdom) B Klein (Australia) D Propoggia	6	6
3	(Japan) T Matsui (Chinese Taipei) T-h Yang	4	2
WC	(Australia) G Jones (Australia) C O'Connell	7^{8}	6
(Australia) M Banes (Australia) B Mott	6^{6}	3
Alt	(Australia) D Kelly (Australia) S Puodziunas	5	3
2	(Australia) Jarryd Chaplin (New Zealand) B McLachlan	7	6

Quarterfinals
1	(Australia) S de Waard (Australia) L Saville	7	7^{7}
(Australia) A Bolt (Australia) A Whittington	5	6^{5}
4	(Switzerland) L Margaroli (Egypt) M Safwat	6^{4}	3
(Italy) R Bellotti (Slovenia) B Rola	7^{7}	6
(Australia) B Mousley (Japan) A Santillan	6^{4}	4
PR	(United Kingdom) B Klein (Australia) D Propoggia	7^{7}	6
WC	(Australia) G Jones (Australia) C O'Connell	4	3
2	(Australia) J Chaplin (New Zealand) B McLachlan	6	6

Semifinals
1	(Australia) S de Waard (Australia) L Saville	6	6^{5}	[10]
(Italy) R Bellotti (Slovenia) B Rola	4	7^{7}	[7]
PR	(United Kingdom) B Klein (Australia) D Propoggia	6	6
2	(Australia) J Chaplin (New Zealand) B McLachlan	4	4

Final
1	(Australia) S de Waard (Australia) L Saville	3	4
PR	(United Kingdom) B Klein (Australia) D Propoggia	6	6
