= 2017 Burnie International – Women's doubles =

Women's doubles
- 2017 Burnie International

Final
- Champions: (Japan) Riko Sawayanagi (Czech Republic) Barbora Štefková
- Runners-up: (Australia) Alison Bai (Thailand) Varatchaya Wongteanchai
- Score: 7–6^{(8–6)}, 4–6, [10–7]

Events
Singles	men	women
Doubles	men	women
← 2015 ·	Burnie International	· 2018 →

Irina Falconi and Petra Martić were the defending champions having won the previous edition in 2015, but chose not to participate.
Riko Sawayanagi and Barbora Štefková won the title, defeating Alison Bai and Varatchaya Wongteanchai in the final, 7–6^{(8–6)}, 4–6, [10–7].

== Seeds ==
1. (United States) Asia Muhammad / (United States) Taylor Townsend (first round; retired)
2. (United States) Jamie Loeb / (Australia) Arina Rodionova (first round)
3. (China) Han Xinyun / (Japan) Hiroko Kuwata (semifinals)
4. (Australia) Jessica Moore / (Australia) Storm Sanders (first round; withdrew)

== Draw ==
=== Key ===
- Q = Qualifier
- WC = Wild card
- LL = Lucky loser
- Alt = Alternate
- SE = Special exempt
- PR = Protected ranking
- ITF = ITF entry
- JE = Junior exempt
- w/o = Walkover
- r = Retired
- d = Defaulted
- SR = Special ranking

First round
1	(United States) A Muhammad (United States) T Townsend	1^{r}
(United Kingdom) F Christie (France) S Reix	1
WC	(Australia) J Fourlis (Australia) M Inglis	3	2
(Australia) A Bai (Thailand) V Wongteanchai	6	6
4	(Australia) J Moore (Australia) S Sanders
WC	(Australia) N Bains (Australia) S Tomic	w/o
Q	(United Kingdom) K Dunne (Australia) P Hon	6	6
(Australia) T Patterson (Australia) O Rogowska	4	3
(Australia) A Myers (Japan) Y Tanaka	4	5
Q	(Italy) G Brescia (Slovenia) T Zidanšek	6	7
(China) J Lu (Russia) A Pivovarova	3	1
3	(China) X Han (Japan) H Kuwata	6	6
(Japan) R Sawayanagi (Czech Republic) B Štefková	6	7
(France) A Lim (Bulgaria) A Naydenova	4	5
WC	(Australia) M Adamczak (Australia) O Tjandramulia	7^{11}	2	[10]
2	(United States) J Loeb (Australia) Ar Rodionova	6^{9}	6	[8]

Quarterfinals
(United Kingdom) F Christie (France) S Reix	6^{6}	2
(Australia) A Bai (Thailand) V Wongteanchai	7^{8}	6
WC	(Australia) N Bains (Australia) S Tomic	5	7	[10]
Q	(United Kingdom) K Dunne (Australia) P Hon	7	5	[3]
Q	(Italy) G Brescia (Slovenia) T Zidanšek	2	4
3	(China) X Han (Japan) H Kuwata	6	6
(Japan) R Sawayanagi (Czech Republic) B Štefková	6	4	[12]
WC	(Australia) M Adamczak (Australia) O Tjandramulia	3	6	[10]

Semifinals
(Australia) A Bai (Thailand) V Wongteanchai	6	4	[16]
WC	(Australia) N Bains (Australia) S Tomic	3	6	[14]
3	(China) X Han (Japan) H Kuwata	3	5
(Japan) R Sawayanagi (Czech Republic) B Štefková	6	7

Final
(Australia) A Bai (Thailand) V Wongteanchai	6^{6}	6	[7]
(Japan) R Sawayanagi (Czech Republic) B Štefková	7^{8}	4	[10]
