= 2014 McDonald's Burnie International =

Tennis tournament

- Date: 27 January–2 February
- Edition: 12th (men); 6th (women)
- Category: ATP Challenger Tour (men); ITF Women's Circuit (women)
- Prize money: $50,000 (men) $50,000 (women)
- Surface: Hard
- Location: Burnie, Australia

Champions

Men's singles
- (Australia) Matt Reid

Women's singles
- (Japan) Misa Eguchi

Men's doubles
- (Australia) Matt Reid / (Australia) John-Patrick Smith

Women's doubles
- (Australia) Jarmila Gajdošová / (Australia) Storm Sanders
- McDonald's Burnie International

The 2014 McDonald's Burnie International was a professional tennis tournament played on outdoor hard courts. It was the twelfth edition of the tournament for the men and the sixth edition for the women. It was part of the 2014 ATP Challenger Tour and the 2014 ITF Women's Circuit, offering a total of $50,000 in prize money in each the men's and women's events. It took place in Burnie, Tasmania, Australia, on 27 January–2 February 2014.

== Men's singles main draw entrants ==
=== Seeds ===
Country	Player	Rank^{1}	Seed
USA	Bradley Klahn	93	1
AUS	James Duckworth	132	2
JPN	Tatsuma Ito	156	3
JPN	Hiroki Moriya	204	4
AUS	Matt Reid	227	5
AUS	John-Patrick Smith	229	6
NED	Boy Westerhof	240	7
AUS	Greg Jones	259	8

- ^{1} Rankings as of 13 January 2014

=== Other entrants ===
The following players received wildcards into the singles main draw:

- (Australia) Jacob Grills
- (Australia) Omar Jasika
- (United States) Jarmere Jenkins
- (Australia) Bradley Mousley

The following players used Protected Ranking to gain entry into the singles main draw:

- (Czech Republic) Roman Vögeli

The following players received entry from the qualifying draw:

- (Australia) Ryan Agar
- (Australia) Harry Bourchier
- (Australia) Adam Hubble
- (Australia) Christopher O'Connell

The following player received entry into the singles main draw as a lucky loser:

- (Australia) Dayne Kelly

== Women's singles main draw entrants ==
=== Seeds ===
Country	Player	Rank^{1}	Seed
POL	Magda Linette	122	1
USA	Irina Falconi	142	2
AUS	Ashleigh Barty	155	3
AUS	Olivia Rogowska	169	4
CRO	Tereza Mrdeža	179	5
JPN	Erika Sema	181	6
JPN	Eri Hozumi	199	7
USA	Julia Cohen	201	8

- ^{1} Rankings as of 13 January 2014

=== Other entrants ===
The following players received wildcards into the singles main draw:

- (Australia) Lizette Cabrera
- (Australia) Tammi Patterson
- (Australia) Ellen Perez
- (Australia) Sara Tomic

The following players received entry from the qualifying draw:

- (France) Fiona Ferro
- (Japan) Rika Fujiwara
- (Australia) Jessica Moore
- (Bulgaria) Aleksandrina Naydenova

The following player received entry into the singles main draw as a lucky loser:

- (Italy) Jasmine Paolini

== Champions ==
=== Men's singles ===
- (Australia) Matt Reid def. (Japan) Hiroki Moriya, 6–3, 6–2

=== Women's singles ===
- (Japan) Misa Eguchi def. (Russia) Elizaveta Kulichkova, 4–6, 6–2, 6–3

=== Men's doubles ===
- (Australia) Matt Reid / (Australia) John-Patrick Smith def. (Japan) Toshihide Matsui / (Thailand) Danai Udomchoke, 6–4, 6–2

=== Women's doubles ===
- (Australia) Jarmila Gajdošová / (Australia) Storm Sanders def. (Japan) Eri Hozumi / (Japan) Miki Miyamura, 6–4, 6–4
