= 2015 McDonald's Burnie International – Women's singles =

Women's singles
- 2015 McDonald's Burnie International

Final
- Champion: (Russia) Daria Gavrilova
- Runner-up: (United States) Irina Falconi
- Score: 7–5, 7–5

Events
Singles	men	women
Doubles	men	women
← 2014 ·	Burnie International	· 2017 →

Misa Eguchi was the defending champion, but lost in the first round to Han Xinyun.
Daria Gavrilova won the title, defeating Irina Falconi in the final, 7–5, 7–5.

== Seeds ==
1. (United States) Irina Falconi (final)
2. (Japan) Misa Eguchi (first round)
3. (Russia) Daria Gavrilova (champion)
4. (Japan) Risa Ozaki (second round)
5. (Poland) Katarzyna Piter (semifinals)
6. (Czech Republic) Andrea Hlaváčková (semifinals)
7. (Luxembourg) Mandy Minella (quarterfinals)
8. (China) Wang Yafan (first round)

== Main draw ==
=== Key ===
- Q = Qualifier
- WC = Wild card
- LL = Lucky loser
- Alt = Alternate
- SE = Special exempt
- PR = Protected ranking
- ITF = ITF entry
- JE = Junior exempt
- w/o = Walkover
- r = Retired
- d = Defaulted
- SR = Special ranking

=== Finals ===
Semifinals
1	(United States) Irina Falconi	6	6
6	(Czech Republic) Andrea Hlaváčková	1	4
3	(Russia) Daria Gavrilova	6	6
5	(Poland) Katarzyna Piter	2	0

Final
1	(United States) Irina Falconi	5	5
3	(Russia) Daria Gavrilova	7	7

=== Top half ===
First round
1	(United States) I Falconi	6	6
(Australia) Ar Rodionova	0	2
JE	(Switzerland) J Teichmann	6	2	7^{7}
WC	(Australia) T Patterson	3	6	6^{5}
WC	(Australia) D Aiava	0	1
Q	(United States) A Glatch	6	6
(Croatia) P Martić	6	4	6
8	(China) Y Wang	4	6	2
4	(Japan) R Ozaki	6	7^{7}
(Japan) E Sema	1	6^{3}
Q	(Australia) A Bai	6	6^{4}	6
(Japan) M Inoue	3	7^{7}	3
(France) F Ferro	2	6	6
(Thailand) V Wongteanchai	6	1	1
WC	(Australia) S Sanders	4	4
6	(Czech Republic) A Hlaváčková	6	6

Second round
1	(United States) I Falconi	6	6
JE	(Switzerland) J Teichmann	4	1
Q	(United States) A Glatch	4	2
(Croatia) P Martić	6	6
4	(Japan) R Ozaki	1	6	4
Q	(Australia) A Bai	6	3	6
(France) F Ferro	5	3
6	(Czech Republic) A Hlaváčková	7	6

Quarterfinals
1	(United States) I Falconi	6^{6}	7	6
(Croatia) P Martić	7^{8}	5	3
Q	(Australia) A Bai	2	4
6	(Czech Republic) A Hlaváčková	6	6

Semifinals
1	(United States) I Falconi	6	6
6	(Czech Republic) A Hlaváčková	1	4

=== Bottom half ===
First round
7	(Luxembourg) M Minella	7^{7}	6
(Australia) J Moore	6^{4}	1
(China) Z Yang	7^{7}	6
(China) J Lu	6^{5}	3
(Croatia) T Mrdeža	4	6	3
Q	(Australia) V Rajicic	6	0	6
(Japan) J Namigata	2	4
3	(Russia) D Gavrilova	6	6
5	(Poland) K Piter	6	6
(Slovakia) Z Zlochová	0	1
Q	(China) S Xu	3	0
(Croatia) J Fett	6	6
WC	(Australia) S Mendez	2	2
(Thailand) N Lertcheewakarn	6	6
(China) X Han	7	7^{7}
2	(Japan) M Eguchi	5	6^{3}

Second round
7	(Luxembourg) M Minella	6	4	6
(China) Z Yang	3	6	2
Q	(Australia) V Rajicic	4	2
3	(Russia) D Gavrilova	6	6
5	(Poland) K Piter	6	2	6
(Croatia) J Fett	3	6	3
(Thailand) N Lertcheewakarn	4	4
(China) X Han	6	6

Quarterfinals
7	(Luxembourg) M Minella	1	3
3	(Russia) D Gavrilova	6	6
5	(Poland) K Piter	6	6
(China) X Han	1	1

Semifinals
3	(Russia) D Gavrilova	6	6
5	(Poland) K Piter	2	0
