= 2017 City of Onkaparinga ATP Challenger =

- Date: 2–8 January 2017
- Edition: 3rd
- Draw: 32S / 16D
- Prize money: $75,000
- Surface: Hard
- Location: Happy Valley, Australia

Champions

Singles
- (Germany) Peter Gojowczyk

Doubles
- (Chile) Hans Podlipnik / (United States) Max Schnur
← 2016 ·	City of Onkaparinga ATP Challenger	· 2018 →

The 2017 City of Onkaparinga ATP Challenger was a professional tennis tournament played on hard courts. It was the third edition of the tournament and part of the 2017 ATP Challenger Tour. It took place in Happy Valley, Australia from 2 to 8 January 2017.

== Main draw entrants ==
=== Seeds ===
Country	Player	Rank^{1}	Seed
USA	Donald Young	88	1
BRA	João Souza	123	2
USA	Denis Kudla	131	3
CAN	Peter Polansky	135	4
SVK	Norbert Gombos	142	5
BAR	Darian King	152	6
SLO	Grega Žemlja	155	7
HUN	Márton Fucsovics	158	8

- ^{1} Rankings are as of December 26, 2016.

=== Other entrants ===
The following players received wildcards into the singles main draw:

- (Australia) Omar Jasika
- (Australia) Blake Mott
- (Australia) Marc Polmans
- (Australia) Max Purcell

The following player received entry into the singles main draw with a protected ranking:

- (Germany) Matthias Bachinger

The following players received entry from the qualifying draw:

- (Australia) Alex Bolt
- (Kazakhstan) Alexander Bublik
- (Australia) Luke Saville
- (Japan) Yasutaka Uchiyama

== Champions ==
=== Singles ===
- (Germany) Peter Gojowczyk def. (Australia) Omar Jasika 6–3, 6–1.

=== Doubles ===
- (Chile) Hans Podlipnik / (United States) Max Schnur def. (Australia) Steven de Waard / (Australia) Marc Polmans 7–6^{(7–5)}, 4–6, [10–6].
