= 2014 McDonald's Burnie International – Women's singles =

Women's singles
- 2014 McDonald's Burnie International

Final
- Champion: (Japan) Misa Eguchi
- Runner-up: (Russia) Elizaveta Kulichkova
- Score: 4–6, 6–2, 6–3

Events
Singles	men	women
Doubles	men	women
← 2013 ·	Burnie International	· 2015 →

Olivia Rogowska was the defending champion, but lost in the quarterfinals to Misa Eguchi.
Eguchi went on to win the tournament, defeating Elizaveta Kulichkova in the final, 4–6, 6–2, 6–3.

== Seeds ==
1. (Poland) Magda Linette (quarterfinals)
2. (United States) Irina Falconi (first round)
3. (Australia) Ashleigh Barty (first round)
4. (Australia) Olivia Rogowska (quarterfinals)
5. (Croatia) Tereza Mrdeža (first round)
6. (Japan) Erika Sema (first round)
7. (Japan) Eri Hozumi (first round)
8. (United States) Julia Cohen (first round)

== Main draw ==
=== Key ===
- Q = Qualifier
- WC = Wild card
- LL = Lucky loser
- Alt = Alternate
- SE = Special exempt
- PR = Protected ranking
- ITF = ITF entry
- JE = Junior exempt
- w/o = Walkover
- r = Retired
- d = Defaulted
- SR = Special ranking

=== Finals ===
Semifinals
(France) Irena Pavlovic	3	1
(Japan) Misa Eguchi	6	6
(Russia) Elizaveta Kulichkova	7^{7}	6
(Russia) Arina Rodionova	6^{5}	4

Final
(Japan) Misa Eguchi	4	6	6
(Russia) Elizaveta Kulichkova	6	2	3

=== Top half ===
First round
1	(Poland) M Linette	7^{7}	6
(China) Y Zhang	6^{0}	2
Q	(Australia) J Moore	4	4
WC	(Australia) T Patterson	6	6
(Australia) V Rajicic	7^{7}	6
WC	(Australia) L Cabrera	6^{1}	2
(France) I Pavlovic	5	6	7^{8}
7	(Japan) E Hozumi	7	0	6^{6}
4	(Australia) O Rogowska	7	6
WC	(Australia) S Tomic	5	2
Q	(Bulgaria) A Naydenova	6	6
(Japan) Y Sema	2	1
(Australia) J Gajdošová	6	6
(Australia) M Adamczak	2	4
(Japan) M Eguchi	6	6
5	(Croatia) T Mrdeža	3	0

Second round
1	(Poland) M Linette	6^{3}	6	6
WC	(Australia) T Patterson	7^{7}	4	3
(Australia) V Rajicic	1	2
(France) I Pavlovic	6	6
4	(Australia) O Rogowska	6	6
Q	(Bulgaria) A Naydenova	3	4
(Australia) J Gajdošová	3	4
(Japan) M Eguchi	6	6

Quarterfinals
1	(Poland) M Linette	3	3
(France) I Pavlovic	6	6
4	(Australia) O Rogowska	4	3
(Japan) M Eguchi	6	6

Semifinals
(France) I Pavlovic	3	1
(Japan) M Eguchi	6	6

=== Bottom half ===
First round
6	(Japan) E Sema	1	2
Q	(France) F Ferro	6	6
(Japan) H Kuwata	6	4	3
LL	(Italy) J Paolini	2	6	6
(Russia) E Kulichkova	6	6
(Japan) J Namigata	4	2
(Chinese Taipei) Y-j Chan	4	6	6
3	(Australia) A Barty	6	3	4
8	(United States) J Cohen	0	0
(Australia) S Sanders	6	6
(Japan) M Imanishi	3	2
(Russia) A Rodionova	6	6
(United Kingdom) N Broady	5	5
WC	(Australia) E Perez	7	7
Q	(Japan) R Fujiwara	6	6
2	(United States) I Falconi	4	3

Second round
Q	(France) F Ferro	4	6	3
LL	(Italy) J Paolini	6	3	6
(Russia) E Kulichkova	6	6
(Chinese Taipei) Y-j Chan	4	2
(Australia) S Sanders	4	2
(Russia) A Rodionova	6	6
WC	(Australia) E Perez	5	7^{7}	6
Q	(Japan) R Fujiwara	7	6^{3}	4

Quarterfinals
LL	(Italy) J Paolini	3	0
(Russia) E Kulichkova	6	6
(Russia) A Rodionova	6	6
WC	(Australia) E Perez	3	2

Semifinals
(Russia) E Kulichkova	7^{7}	6
(Russia) A Rodionova	6^{5}	4
