= 2017 Burnie International – Women's singles =

Women's singles
- 2017 Burnie International

Final
- Champion: (United States) Asia Muhammad
- Runner-up: (Australia) Arina Rodionova
- Score: 6–2, 6–1

Events
Singles	men	women
Doubles	men	women
← 2015 ·	Burnie International	· 2018 →

Daria Gavrilova was the defending champion having won the last edition in 2015, but chose not to participate.
Asia Muhammad won the title, defeating Arina Rodionova in the final, 6–2, 6–1.

== Seeds ==
1. (China) Han Xinyun (second round)
2. (United States) Taylor Townsend (semifinals)
3. (Russia) Elizaveta Kulichkova (quarterfinals)
4. (United States) Asia Muhammad (champion)
5. (Russia) Anastasia Pivovarova (first round)
6. (Slovenia) Tamara Zidanšek (quarterfinals)
7. (Czech Republic) Barbora Štefková (second round)
8. (Australia) Arina Rodionova (final)

== Main draw ==
=== Key ===
- Q = Qualifier
- WC = Wild card
- LL = Lucky loser
- Alt = Alternate
- SE = Special exempt
- PR = Protected ranking
- ITF = ITF entry
- JE = Junior exempt
- w/o = Walkover
- r = Retired
- d = Defaulted
- SR = Special ranking

=== Finals ===
Semifinals
(Czech Republic) Marie Bouzková	2	3
4	(United States) Asia Muhammad	6	6
8	(Australia) Arina Rodionova	3	6	7^{7}
2	(United States) Taylor Townsend	6	4	6^{5}

Final
4	(United States) Asia Muhammad	6	6
8	(Australia) Arina Rodionova	2	1

=== Top half ===
First round
1	(China) X Han	6	6
(Romania) IM Bara	3	3
Q	(Canada) A Wozniak	6	6
WC	(Australia) S Tomic	2	1
WC	(Australia) J Fourlis	6	4	2
(Czech Republic) M Bouzková	3	6	6
(Bulgaria) A Naydenova	2	1
7	(Czech Republic) B Štefková	6	6
4	(United States) A Muhammad	6	6
(China) J Lu	3	3
(Japan) H Kuwata	6	7^{7}
WC	(Australia) N Bains	2	6^{1}
(Thailand) V Wongteanchai	3	3
(France) M Georges	6	6
Q	(France) T Andrianjafitrimo	7	4	2
6	(Slovenia) T Zidanšek	5	6	6

Second round
1	(China) X Han	3	2
Q	(Canada) A Wozniak	6	6
(Czech Republic) M Bouzková	6	3	6
7	(Czech Republic) B Štefková	2	6	3
4	(United States) A Muhammad	6	4	6
(Japan) H Kuwata	2	6	1
(France) M Georges	4	3
6	(Slovenia) T Zidanšek	6	6

Quarterfinals
Q	(Canada) A Wozniak	0	4
(Czech Republic) M Bouzková	6	6
4	(United States) A Muhammad	7	6
6	(Slovenia) T Zidanšek	5	3

Semifinals
(Czech Republic) M Bouzková	2	3
4	(United States) A Muhammad	6	6

=== Bottom half ===
First round
8	(Australia) Ar Rodionova	6^{6}	6	7
(Japan) K Okamura	7^{8}	4	5
(Australia) D Aiava	6	6
Q	(Slovakia) Z Zlochová	2	2
(France) S Reix	4	3
Q	(United States) A Stevenson	6	6
(United States) K Ahn	6^{5}	6	2
3	(Russia) E Kulichkova	7^{7}	4	6
5	(Russia) A Pivovarova	3	6	5
(Australia) O Rogowska	6	1	7
(France) A Lim	6	0
WC	(Australia) O Tjandramulia	3	0^{r}
(Japan) R Sawayanagi	0	1
(United States) J Loeb	6	6
(United States) J Elie	3	4
2	(United States) T Townsend	6	6

Second round
8	(Australia) Ar Rodionova	6	1	6
(Australia) D Aiava	4	6	3
Q	(United States) A Stevenson	4	5
3	(Russia) E Kulichkova	6	7
(Australia) O Rogowska	6	1	6
(France) A Lim	4	6	3
(United States) J Loeb	6	1	2
2	(United States) T Townsend	4	6	6

Quarterfinals
8	(Australia) Ar Rodionova	6	6
3	(Russia) E Kulichkova	3	2
(Australia) O Rogowska	3	3
2	(United States) T Townsend	6	6

Semifinals
8	(Australia) Ar Rodionova	3	6	7^{7}
2	(United States) T Townsend	6	4	6^{5}
