= 2016 Canberra Challenger – Doubles =

Doubles
- 2016 Canberra Challenger

Final
- Champions: (Poland) Mariusz Fyrstenberg (Mexico) Santiago González
- Runners-up: (Australia) Maverick Banes (Australia) Jarryd Chaplin
- Score: 7–6^{(7–3)}, 6–3

Events
Singles	Doubles
- Canberra Challenger

Top seeds Mariusz Fyrstenberg and Santiago González won the title, beating Maverick Banes and Jarryd Chaplin 7–6^{(7–3)}, 6–3

== Seeds ==
1. (Poland) Mariusz Fyrstenberg / (Mexico) Santiago González (champions)
2. (Austria) Philipp Oswald / (Canada) Adil Shamasdin (first round)
3. (Belarus) Sergey Betov / (Belarus) Aliaksandr Bury (quarterfinals)
4. (Australia) Carsten Ball / (Germany) Frank Moser (semifinals)

== Draw ==
Key

- Q = Qualifier
- WC = Wild card
- LL = Lucky loser
- Alt = Alternate
- ITF = ITF entry
- PR = Protected ranking
- SR = Special ranking
- SE = Special exempt
- JE = Junior exempt
- JR = Junior Accelerator Programme entrant
- CO = College Accelerator Programme entrant
- NG = Next Gen Accelerator Program entrant
- w/o = Walkover
- r = Retired
- d = Defaulted

First round
1	(Poland) M Fyrstenberg (Mexico) S González	7^{8}	6
(Australia) D Kelly (Italy) S Napolitano	6^{6}	3
(United States) J Cerretani (United States) M Schnur	6	6
WC	(Australia) K Pearson (Australia) A Popyrin	3	3
3	(Belarus) S Betov (Belarus) A Bury	6	6
WC	(Australia) B Ellis (Australia) A Walton	1	3
(Australia) J Delaney (Australia) M Purcell	6	6
(Italy) Enrico Becuzzi (Italy) P Lorenzi	2	3
(Greece) K Economidis (Greece) S Tsitsipas	w/o
(Spain) D Gimeno-Traver (Spain) D Muñoz de la Nava
WC	(Australia) Daniel Hobart (Australia) Daniel Nolan	4	4
4	(Australia) C Ball (Germany) F Moser	6	6
(Japan) Hiroyasu Ehara (China) X Gao	6	7^{7}
(Australia) S de Waard (Australia) A Whittington	4	6^{3}
(Australia) M Banes (Australia) Jarryd Chaplin	3	6	[12]
2	(Austria) P Oswald (Canada) A Shamasdin	6	3	[10]

Quarterfinals
1	(Poland) M Fyrstenberg (Mexico) S González	7	6^{5}	[10]
(United States) J Cerretani (United States) M Schnur	5	7^{7}	[4]
3	(Belarus) S Betov (Belarus) A Bury	6^{5}	7^{7}	[5]
(Australia) J Delaney (Australia) M Purcell	7^{7}	6^{4}	[10]
(Greece) K Economidis (Greece) S Tsitsipas	4	7	[5]
4	(Australia) C Ball (Germany) F Moser	6	5	[10]
(Japan) H Ehara (China) X Gao	3	6^{3}
(Australia) M Banes (Australia) J Chaplin	6	7^{7}

Semifinals
1	(Poland) M Fyrstenberg (Mexico) S González	7^{7}	7^{9}
(Australia) J Delaney (Australia) M Purcell	6^{4}	6^{7}
4	(Australia) C Ball (Germany) F Moser	6^{9}	4
(Australia) M Banes (Australia) J Chaplin	7^{11}	6

Final
1	(Poland) M Fyrstenberg (Mexico) S González	7^{7}	6
(Australia) M Banes (Australia) J Chaplin	6^{3}	3
