= 2016 Launceston Tennis International – Women's doubles =

Women's doubles
- 2016 Launceston Tennis International

Final
- Champions: (China) You Xiaodi (China) Zhu Lin
- Runners-up: (Ukraine) Nadiia Kichenok (Luxembourg) Mandy Minella
- Score: 2–6, 7–5, [10–7]

Events
Singles	men	women
Doubles	men	women
← 2015 ·	Launceston Tennis International	· 2017 →

Han Xinyun and Junri Namigata were the defending champions, but Namigata chose not to participate . Han partnered Katarzyna Piter, but lost in the quarterfinals to Tammi Patterson and Olivia Rogowska .

You Xiaodi and Zhu Lin won the title, defeating top seeds Nadiia Kichenok and Mandy Minella in the final 2–6, 7–5, [10–7] .

== Seeds ==
1. (Ukraine) Nadiia Kichenok / (Luxembourg) Mandy Minella (final)
2. (China) Han Xinyun / (Poland) Katarzyna Piter (quarterfinals)
3. (Thailand) Varatchaya Wongteanchai / (China) Yang Zhaoxuan (semifinals)
4. (Chinese Taipei) Hsu Chieh-yu / (Japan) Hiroko Kuwata (quarterfinals)

== Draw ==
=== Key ===
- Q = Qualifier
- WC = Wild card
- LL = Lucky loser
- Alt = Alternate
- SE = Special exempt
- PR = Protected ranking
- ITF = ITF entry
- JE = Junior exempt
- w/o = Walkover
- r = Retired
- d = Defaulted
- SR = Special ranking

First round
1	(Ukraine) N Kichenok (Luxembourg) M Minella	7^{7}	4	[12]
Q	(Russia) A Gabueva (Russia) A Pivovarova	6^{5}	6	[10]
WC	(Australia) J Moore (Ukraine) D Yastremska	6	4	[8]
(China) J Lu (Japan) E Sema	1	6	[10]
3	(Thailand) V Wongteanchai (China) Z Yang	3	6	[10]
(United States) Y Chiang (Australia) A Myers	6	2	[8]
(Japan) M Inoue (Finland) E Laine	1	5
(China) Q Ye (Hong Kong) L Zhang	6	7
(China) X You (China) L Zhu	6	6
(United States) J Elie (Australia) S Peers	3	3
Q	(France) T Andrianjafitrimo (Japan) M Imanishi	4	1
4	(Chinese Taipei) C-y Hsu (Japan) H Kuwata	6	6
(Australia) T Patterson (Australia) O Rogowska	3	6	[10]
WC	(Australia) A Bai (Australia) N Bains	6	4	[8]
(Japan) A Omae (Japan) Y Tanaka	5	3
2	(China) X Han (Poland) K Piter	7	6

Quarterfinals
1	(Ukraine) N Kichenok (Luxembourg) M Minella	6	6
(China) J Lu (Japan) E Sema	3	2
3	(Thailand) V Wongteanchai (China) Z Yang	6	6
(China) Q Ye (Hong Kong) L Zhang	2	2
(China) X You (China) L Zhu	5	6	[11]
4	(Chinese Taipei) C-y Hsu (Japan) H Kuwata	7	4	[9]
(Australia) T Patterson (Australia) O Rogowska	6	6
2	(China) X Han (Poland) K Piter	3	4

Semifinals
1	(Ukraine) N Kichenok (Luxembourg) M Minella	7^{15}	6
3	(Thailand) V Wongteanchai (China) Z Yang	6^{13}	1
(China) X You (China) L Zhu	7	6
(Australia) T Patterson (Australia) O Rogowska	5	4

Final
1	(Ukraine) N Kichenok (Luxembourg) M Minella	6	5	[7]
(China) X You (China) L Zhu	2	7	[10]
