= 2017 Burnie International – Men's singles =

Tennis contest held in Burnie

Men's singles
- 2017 Burnie International

Final
- Champion: (Australia) Omar Jasika
- Runner-up: (Australia) Blake Mott
- Score: 6–2, 6–2

Events
Singles	men	women
Doubles	men	women
- Burnie International

Chung Hyeon was the defending champion but chose not to defend his title.

Omar Jasika won the title after defeating Blake Mott 6–2, 6–2 in the final.

== Seeds ==
1. (Japan) Go Soeda (first round)
2. (Chinese Taipei) Jason Jung (first round)
3. (Australia) Andrew Whittington (first round)
4. (Egypt) Mohamed Safwat (second round)
5. (Australia) Matthew Barton (second round)
6. (United States) Noah Rubin (second round)
7. (Kazakhstan) Alexander Bublik (second round)
8. (Japan) Akira Santillan (semifinals)

== Draw ==
Key

- Q = Qualifier
- WC = Wild card
- LL = Lucky loser
- Alt = Alternate
- ITF = ITF entry
- PR = Protected ranking
- SR = Special ranking
- SE = Special exempt
- JE = Junior exempt
- JR = Junior Accelerator Programme entrant
- CO = College Accelerator Programme entrant
- NG = Next Gen Accelerator Program entrant
- w/o = Walkover
- r = Retired
- d = Defaulted

=== Finals ===
Semifinals
8	(Japan) Akira Santillan	6^{6}	7	4
(Australia) Blake Mott	7^{8}	5	6
(Australia) Omar Jasika	6	1	6
(Kazakhstan) Dmitry Popko	1	6	3

Final
(Australia) Blake Mott	2	2
(Australia) Omar Jasika	6	6

=== Top half ===
First round
1	(Japan) G Soeda	4	2
Q	(Australia) D Kelly	6	6
(United States) E King	6^{5}	6^{1}
WC	(Australia) A Bolt	7^{7}	7^{7}
(Italy) R Bellotti	2	6	6
(Australia) M Purcell	6	1	3
(United Kingdom) B Klein	3	6	2
8	(Japan) A Santillan	6	3	6
4	(Egypt) M Safwat	7^{7}	6
WC	(Australia) B Mousley	6^{3}	2
Q	(Australia) G Jones	0	5
(Australia) B Mott	6	7
Q	(Australia) M Banes	6	4	6
(Japan) T Niki	3	6	2
(United States) M Krueger	2	6^{3}
6	(United States) N Rubin	6	7^{7}

Second round
Q	(Australia) D Kelly	3	4
WC	(Australia) A Bolt	6	6
(Italy) R Bellotti	3	4
8	(Japan) A Santillan	6	6
4	(Egypt) M Safwat	6^{3}	3
(Australia) B Mott	7^{7}	6
Q	(Australia) M Banes	7^{7}	6
6	(United States) N Rubin	6^{5}	4

Quarterfinals
WC	(Australia) A Bolt	3	6	2
8	(Japan) A Santillan	6	4	6
(Australia) B Mott	6	6^{8}	6
Q	(Australia) M Banes	2	7^{10}	3

Semifinals
8	(Japan) A Santillan	6^{6}	7	4
(Australia) B Mott	7^{8}	5	6

=== Bottom half ===
First round
5	(Australia) M Barton	6	6
(Australia) M Polmans	1	4
(Australia) O Jasika	6	6
(United States) D Nguyen	3	4
WC	(Australia) M Ebden	6^{2}	6	6
WC	(Australia) H Bourchier	7^{7}	2	0
(Slovenia) B Rola	6^{5}	6	6
3	(Australia) A Whittington	7^{7}	4	4
7	(Kazakhstan) A Bublik	6	7
(Japan) Yuya Kibi	3	5
(Australia) C O'Connell	6	2	6
Q	(Australia) J Frawley	2	6	0
(Kazakhstan) D Popko	6	6
(Serbia) P Krstin	1	4
(Australia) L Saville	2	6	6
2	(Chinese Taipei) J Jung	6	1	4

Second round
5	(Australia) M Barton	1	5
(Australia) O Jasika	6	7
WC	(Australia) M Ebden	6	6
(Slovenia) B Rola	4	4
7	(Kazakhstan) A Bublik	6^{6}	5
(Australia) C O'Connell	7^{8}	7
(Kazakhstan) D Popko	4	6	6
(Australia) L Saville	6	3	4

Quarterfinals
(Australia) O Jasika	7^{7}	2	6
WC	(Australia) M Ebden	6^{2}	6	2
(Australia) C O'Connell	1	4
(Kazakhstan) D Popko	6	6

Semifinals
(Australia) O Jasika	6	1	6
(Kazakhstan) D Popko	1	6	3
