= 2016 Launceston Tennis International – Women's singles =

Women's singles
- 2016 Launceston Tennis International

Final
- Champion: (China) Han Xinyun
- Runner-up: (Russia) Alla Kudryavtseva
- Score: 6–1 , 6–1

Events
Singles	men	women
Doubles	men	women
← 2015 ·	Launceston Tennis International	· 2017 →

Daria Gavrilova was the defending champion, but chose not to participate.

Han Xinyun won the title, defeating Alla Kudryavtseva in the final 6–1, 6–1.

== Seeds ==
1. (Croatia) Donna Vekić (second round)
2. (Japan) Risa Ozaki (semifinals)
3. (China) Zhang Kailin (second round)
4. (China) Han Xinyun (champion)
5. (Luxembourg) Mandy Minella (first round)
6. (China) Yang Zhaoxuan (quarterfinals)
7. (Japan) Hiroko Kuwata (first round)
8. (China) Zhu Lin (first round)

== Main draw ==
=== Key ===
- Q = Qualifier
- WC = Wild card
- LL = Lucky loser
- Alt = Alternate
- SE = Special exempt
- PR = Protected ranking
- ITF = ITF entry
- JE = Junior exempt
- w/o = Walkover
- r = Retired
- d = Defaulted
- SR = Special ranking

=== Finals ===
Semifinals
(Russia) Alla Kudryavtseva	1	6	7^{7}
(United States) Vania King	6	3	6^{5}
4	(China) Han Xinyun	6	6
2	(Japan) Risa Ozaki	1	4

Final
(Russia) Alla Kudryavtseva	1	1
4	(China) Han Xinyun	6	6

=== Top half ===
First round
1	(Croatia) D Vekić	6	2	6
Q	(Australia) L Cabrera	3	6	3
(Ukraine) N Kichenok	4	6	7
(Australia) O Rogowska	6	4	5
(Australia) A Bai	6	6
WC	(Australia) A Myers	4	2
(Russia) A Kudryavtseva	7^{8}	6
7	(Japan) H Kuwata	6^{6}	4
3	(China) K Zhang	2	6	6
(France) T Andrianjafitrimo	6	4	4
(China) Y Xu	2	2
(United States) V King	6	6
(Japan) E Sema	3	1
Q	(United States) S Santamaria	6	6
(Australia) J Moore	6	6
5	(Luxembourg) M Minella	2	4

Second round
1	(Croatia) D Vekić	6^{5}	5
(Ukraine) N Kichenok	7^{7}	7
(Australia) A Bai	6^{3}	2
(Russia) A Kudryavtseva	7^{7}	6
3	(China) K Zhang	6	3	2
(United States) V King	4	6	6
Q	(United States) S Santamaria	1	6^{6}
(Australia) J Moore	6	7^{8}

Quarterfinals
(Ukraine) N Kichenok	5	6	0
(Russia) A Kudryavtseva	7	1	6
(United States) V King	6	6
(Australia) J Moore	3	1

Semifinals
(Russia) A Kudryavtseva	1	6	7^{7}
(United States) V King	6	3	6^{5}

=== Bottom half ===
First round
8	(China) L Zhu	4	2
WC	(Australia) N Bains	6	6
(China) J Lu	6	6
(Japan) M Inoue	2	4
(Russia) A Pivovarova	7^{8}	3	4
(Thailand) V Wongteanchai	6^{6}	6	6
WC	(Australia) T Patterson	2	6^{3}
4	(China) X Han	6	7^{7}
6	(China) Z Yang	6	6
(Hong Kong) L Zhang	1	2
PR	(Japan) M Imanishi	6	2
Q	(Slovakia) Z Zlochová	4	0^{r}
(Poland) K Piter	5	6	7^{7}
WC	(Ukraine) D Yastremska	7	4	6^{4}
Q	(United States) J Elie	4	2
2	(Japan) R Ozaki	6	6

Second round
WC	(Australia) N Bains	4	6	6^{2}
(China) J Lu	6	1	7^{7}
(Thailand) V Wongteanchai	3	2
4	(China) X Han	6	6
6	(China) Z Yang	6	7^{7}
PR	(Japan) M Imanishi	0	6^{0}
(Poland) K Piter	1	6	1
2	(Japan) R Ozaki	6	3	6

Quarterfinals
(China) J Lu	6^{6}	3
4	(China) X Han	7^{8}	6
6	(China) Z Yang	6^{1}	1
2	(Japan) R Ozaki	7^{7}	6

Semifinals
4	(China) X Han	6	6
2	(Japan) R Ozaki	1	4
