= 2014 McDonald's Burnie International – Women's doubles =

Women's doubles
- 2014 McDonald's Burnie International

Final
- Champions: (Australia) Jarmila Gajdošová (Australia) Storm Sanders
- Runners-up: (Japan) Eri Hozumi (Japan) Miki Miyamura
- Score: 6–4, 6–4

Events
Singles	men	women
Doubles	men	women
← 2013 ·	Burnie International	· 2015 →

Shuko Aoyama and Erika Sema were the defending champions, but Aoyama decided not to defend her title. Erika teamed up with her sister Yurika Sema as the fourth seeds, but they lost in the first round.
Jarmila Gajdošová and Storm Sanders won the title, defeating Eri Hozumi and Miki Miyamura in the final, 6–4, 6–4.

== Seeds ==
1. (Chinese Taipei) Chan Yung-jan / (United States) Irina Falconi (semifinals)
2. (Japan) Eri Hozumi / (Japan) Miki Miyamura (final)
3. (United Kingdom) Naomi Broady / (Poland) Magda Linette (first round)
4. (Japan) Erika Sema / (Japan) Yurika Sema (first round)

== Draw ==
=== Key ===
- Q = Qualifier
- WC = Wild card
- LL = Lucky loser
- Alt = Alternate
- SE = Special exempt
- PR = Protected ranking
- ITF = ITF entry
- JE = Junior exempt
- w/o = Walkover
- r = Retired
- d = Defaulted
- SR = Special ranking

First round
1	(Chinese Taipei) Y-j Chan (United States) I Falconi	6	6
(United States) J Cohen (Bulgaria) A Naydenova	2	1
WC	(Australia) T Calderwood (Australia) N Collie	3	1
WC	(Australia) N Baric (Australia) E Perez	6	6
3	(United Kingdom) N Broady (Poland) M Linette	3	5
(Australia) T Patterson (Russia) A Rodionova	6	7
Q	(Japan) M Inoue (China) Y Zhang	7^{7}	1	[12]
(Australia) J Gajdošová (Australia) S Sanders	6^{4}	6	[14]
Q	(Ukraine) A Kalinina (Russia) E Kulichkova	4	3
(Japan) M Eguchi (Australia) V Rajicic	6	6
(Australia) A Barty (Australia) J Moore	7	7
4	(Japan) E Sema (Japan) Y Sema	5	5
WC	(Australia) L Cabrera (Australia) S Tomic	3	4
(Japan) R Fujiwara (Japan) J Namigata	6	6
(Australia) M Adamczak (Australia) O Rogowska	6	2	[8]
2	(Japan) E Hozumi (Japan) M Miyamura	2	6	[10]

Quarterfinals
1	(Chinese Taipei) Y-j Chan (United States) I Falconi	6	6
WC	(Australia) N Baric (Australia) E Perez	1	4
(Australia) T Patterson (Russia) A Rodionova	3	6	[7]
(Australia) J Gajdošová (Australia) S Sanders	6	2	[10]
(Japan) M Eguchi (Australia) V Rajicic	3	4
(Australia) A Barty (Australia) J Moore	6	6
(Japan) R Fujiwara (Japan) J Namigata	6^{5}	1
2	(Japan) E Hozumi (Japan) M Miyamura	7^{7}	6

Semifinals
1	(Chinese Taipei) Y-j Chan (United States) I Falconi	2	6	[9]
(Australia) J Gajdošová (Australia) S Sanders	6	1	[11]
(Australia) A Barty (Australia) J Moore	6	4	[5]
2	(Japan) E Hozumi (Japan) M Miyamura	4	6	[10]

Final
(Australia) J Gajdošová (Australia) S Sanders	6	6
2	(Japan) E Hozumi (Japan) M Miyamura	4	4
