= 2016 Launceston Tennis International – Men's doubles =

Men's doubles
- 2016 Launceston Tennis International

Final
- Champion: (Australia) Luke Saville (Australia) Jordan Thompson
- Runner-up: (Australia) Dayne Kelly (Australia) Matt Reid
- Score: 6–1 , 4–6 , [13–11]

Events
| Singles | men | women |
| Doubles | men | women |
- Launceston Tennis International

Radu Albot and Mitchell Krueger are the defending champions, but chose not to defend their title .

Luke Saville and Jordan Thompson won the title, defeating Dayne Kelly and Matt Reid in the final 6–1, 4–6, [13–11] .

== Seeds ==
1. (Kazakhstan) Andrey Golubev / (India) Saketh Myneni (semifinals)
2. (Australia) Alex Bolt / (Australia) Andrew Whittington (quarterfinals)
3. (United Kingdom) Brydan Klein / (Japan) Toshihide Matsui (quarterfinals)
4. (Australia) Steven de Waard / (Australia) Marc Polmans (first round)

== Draw ==
Key

- Q = Qualifier
- WC = Wild card
- LL = Lucky loser
- Alt = Alternate
- ITF = ITF entry
- PR = Protected ranking
- SR = Special ranking
- SE = Special exempt
- JE = Junior exempt
- JR = Junior Accelerator Programme entrant
- CO = College Accelerator Programme entrant
- NG = Next Gen Accelerator Program entrant
- w/o = Walkover
- r = Retired
- d = Defaulted

First round
1 | (Kazakhstan) A Golubev (India) S Myneni | 7 | 6
WC | (Australia) H Bourchier (Australia) Daniel Nolan | 5 | 4
(Australia) Jarryd Chaplin (Australia) B Mitchell | 6 | 6
(Japan) T Niki (Japan) Shuichi Sekiguchi | 3 | 2
4 | (Australia) S de Waard (Australia) M Polmans | 3 | 6^{5}
(Australia) D Kelly (Australia) M Reid | 6 | 7^{7}
WC | (Australia) J Delaney (Australia) M Purcell | 3 | 5
(United States) A Sarkissian (New Zealand) F Tearney | 6 | 7
(Japan) Y Ito (New Zealand) J Statham | 6^{2} | 4
(Australia) L Saville (Australia) J Thompson | 7^{7} | 6
(Australia) M Banes (Australia) Gavin van Peperzeel | 6^{5} | 6^{4}
3 | (United Kingdom) B Klein (Japan) T Matsui | 7^{7} | 7^{7}
(Canada) F Peliwo (Japan) K Takeuchi | 3 | 3
(Australia) M Barton (France) S Robert | 6 | 6
WC | (Australia) T Fancutt (Australia) C Puttergill | 2 | 3
2 | (Australia) A Bolt (Australia) A Whittington | 6 | 6

Quarterfinals
1 | (Kazakhstan) A Golubev (India) S Myneni | 6 | 7^{7}
(Australia) J Chaplin (Australia) B Mitchell | 4 | 6^{5}
(Australia) D Kelly (Australia) M Reid | 7^{8} | 6
(United States) A Sarkissian (New Zealand) F Tearney | 6^{6} | 1
(Australia) L Saville (Australia) J Thompson | 6 | 6
3 | (United Kingdom) B Klein (Japan) T Matsui | 3 | 4
(Australia) M Barton (France) S Robert | 6 | 1 | [10]
2 | (Australia) A Bolt (Australia) A Whittington | 3 | 6 | [7]

Semifinals
1 | (Kazakhstan) A Golubev (India) S Myneni | 3 | 3
(Australia) D Kelly (Australia) M Reid | 6 | 6
(Australia) L Saville (Australia) J Thompson | 7 | 7
(Australia) M Barton (France) S Robert | 5 | 5

Final
(Australia) D Kelly (Australia) M Reid | 1 | 6 | [11]
(Australia) L Saville (Australia) J Thompson | 6 | 4 | [13]
