= 2015 McDonald's Burnie International – Women's doubles =

Women's doubles
- 2015 McDonald's Burnie International

Final
- Champions: (United States) Irina Falconi (Croatia) Petra Martić
- Runners-up: (China) Han Xinyun (Japan) Junri Namigata
- Score: 6–2, 6–4

Events
Singles	men	women
Doubles	men	women
← 2014 ·	Burnie International	· 2017 →

Jarmila Gajdošová and Storm Sanders were the defending champions, but Gajdošová chose not to participate. Sanders partnered up with Destanee Aiava, but lost in the quarterfinals to Misa Eguchi and Katarzyna Piter.
Irina Falconi and Petra Martić won the title, defeating Han Xinyun and Junri Namigata in the final, 6–2, 6–4.

== Seeds ==
1. (China) Han Xinyun / (Japan) Junri Namigata (final)
2. (United States) Irina Falconi / (Croatia) Petra Martić (champions)
3. (Japan) Misa Eguchi / (Poland) Katarzyna Piter (semifinals)
4. (Australia) Jessica Moore / (Australia) Abbie Myers (quarterfinals)

== Draw ==
=== Key ===
- Q = Qualifier
- WC = Wild card
- LL = Lucky loser
- Alt = Alternate
- SE = Special exempt
- PR = Protected ranking
- ITF = ITF entry
- JE = Junior exempt
- w/o = Walkover
- r = Retired
- d = Defaulted
- SR = Special ranking

First round
1	(China) X Han (Japan) J Namigata	6	6
(Austria) P König (Australia) K Wlodarczak	3	1
(China) C Liu (China) J Lu	6	6
(United States) A Glatch (Slovakia) Z Zlochová	4	2
3	(Japan) M Eguchi (Poland) K Piter	6	6
WC	(Australia) S Peers (Australia) A Sumner	0	4
(Australia) A Bai (Japan) M Inoue	6	6^{5}	[7]
WC	(Australia) D Aiava (Australia) S Sanders	4	7^{7}	[10]
(China) Y Wang (China) Z Yang	6	6
Q	(Switzerland) J Teichmann (China) S Xu	3	2
WC	(Australia) N Collie (Australia) K Ryan	7^{7}	2	[4]
4	(Australia) J Moore (Australia) A Myers	6^{5}	6	[10]
Q	(Thailand) N Lertcheewakarn (Australia) T Patterson	4	7	[5]
(Thailand) Vara Wongteanchai (Thailand) Varu Wongteanchai	6	5	[10]
(Japan) M Kato (Japan) E Sema	4	0
2	(United States) I Falconi (Croatia) P Martić	6	6

Quarterfinals
1	(China) X Han (Japan) J Namigata	7^{8}	6^{4}	[10]
(China) C Liu (China) J Lu	6^{6}	7^{7}	[8]
3	(Japan) M Eguchi (Poland) K Piter	4	7	[14]
WC	(Australia) D Aiava (Australia) S Sanders	6	5	[12]
(China) Y Wang (China) Z Yang	6	5	[10]
4	(Australia) J Moore (Australia) A Myers	4	7	[5]
(Thailand) Vara Wongteanchai (Thailand) Varu Wongteanchai	2	1
2	(United States) I Falconi (Croatia) P Martić	6	6

Semifinals
1	(China) X Han (Japan) J Namigata	6	6
3	(Japan) M Eguchi (Poland) K Piter	4	2
(China) Y Wang (China) Z Yang	4	3
2	(United States) I Falconi (Croatia) P Martić	6	6

Final
1	(China) X Han (Japan) J Namigata	2	4
2	(United States) I Falconi (Croatia) P Martić	6	6
