= 2014 McDonald's Burnie International – Men's singles =

Tennis contest held in Burnie

Men's singles
- 2014 McDonald's Burnie International

Final
- Champion: (Australia) Matt Reid
- Runner-up: (Japan) Hiroki Moriya
- Score: 6–3, 6–2

Events
Singles	men	women
Doubles	men	women
- Burnie International

John Millman was the defending champion but decided not to participate.
Matt Reid defeated Hiroki Moriya 6–3, 6–2 in the final to win the title.

== Seeds ==
1. (United States) Bradley Klahn (withdrew due to wrist pains)
2. (Australia) James Duckworth (second round)
3. (Japan) Tatsuma Ito (second round)
4. (Japan) Hiroki Moriya (final)
5. (Australia) Matt Reid (champion)
6. (Australia) John-Patrick Smith (second round)
7. (Netherlands) Boy Westerhof (second round)
8. (Australia) Greg Jones (second round)

== Draw ==
Key

- Q = Qualifier
- WC = Wild card
- LL = Lucky loser
- Alt = Alternate
- ITF = ITF entry
- PR = Protected ranking
- SR = Special ranking
- SE = Special exempt
- JE = Junior exempt
- JR = Junior Accelerator Programme entrant
- CO = College Accelerator Programme entrant
- NG = Next Gen Accelerator Program entrant
- w/o = Walkover
- r = Retired
- d = Defaulted

=== Finals ===
Semifinals
WC	(United States) Jarmere Jenkins	4	4
4	(Japan) Hiroki Moriya	6	6
5	(Australia) Matt Reid	6	6
(Japan) Yuichi Ito	2	1

Final
4	(Japan) Hiroki Moriya	3	2
5	(Australia) Matt Reid	6	6

=== Top half ===
First round
LL	(Australia) D Kelly	4	5
WC	(Australia) Jacob Grills	6	7
(Russia) V Rudnev	3	3
WC	(United States) J Jenkins	6	6
(Japan) Shuichi Sekiguchi	2	2
(Australia) M Barton	6	6
PR	(Czech Republic) R Vögeli	3	1
8	(Australia) G Jones	6	6
4	(Japan) H Moriya	6	6
(France) M Chazal	4	3
Q	(Australia) R Agar	3	0
(Japan) T Matsui	6	6
(Japan) K Takeuchi	0	6	2
(Australia) A Bolt	6	2	6
(Australia) D Propoggia	6^{1}	7^{7}	4
7	(Netherlands) B Westerhof	7^{7}	6^{1}	6

Second round
WC	(Australia) J Grills	1	6	2
WC	(United States) J Jenkins	6	4	6
(Australia) M Barton	4	6	7^{7}
8	(Australia) G Jones	6	3	6^{4}
4	(Japan) H Moriya	6	7
(Japan) T Matsui	4	5
(Australia) A Bolt	7^{7}	6^{4}	7
7	(Netherlands) B Westerhof	6^{4}	7^{7}	5

Quarterfinals
WC	(United States) J Jenkins	6	6^{7}	7^{15}
(Australia) M Barton	2	7^{9}	6^{13}
4	(Japan) H Moriya	6	6
(Australia) A Bolt	4	4

Semifinals
WC	(United States) J Jenkins	4	4
4	(Japan) H Moriya	6	6

=== Bottom half ===
First round
5	(Australia) M Reid	6	6
(Australia) A Whittington	4	1
(United Kingdom) B Klein	6^{2}	6	1
(Thailand) D Udomchoke	7^{7}	3	6
(Australia) B Mitchell	6	7^{7}
(Australia) L Saville	1	6^{4}
Q	(Australia) A Hubble	4	6^{4}
3	(Japan) T Ito	6	7^{7}
6	(Australia) J-P Smith	7^{7}	6
WC	(Australia) B Mousley	6^{4}	4
(United States) M Krueger	2	5
Q	(Australia) C O'Connell	6	7
(Japan) Y Ito	1	6	6
Q	(Australia) H Bourchier	6	3	4
WC	(Australia) O Jasika	0	4
2	(Australia) J Duckworth	6	6

Second round
5	(Australia) M Reid	6^{5}	7	6
(Thailand) D Udomchoke	7^{7}	5	4
(Australia) B Mitchell	4	6	6
3	(Japan) T Ito	6	4	2
6	(Australia) J-P Smith	2	6	2
Q	(Australia) C O'Connell	6	3	6
(Japan) Y Ito	6	3	6
2	(Australia) J Duckworth	4	6	3

Quarterfinals
5	(Australia) M Reid	6	3
(Australia) B Mitchell	4	1^{r}
Q	(Australia) C O'Connell	6^{3}	1
(Japan) Y Ito	7^{7}	6

Semifinals
5	(Australia) M Reid	6	6
(Japan) Y Ito	2	1
