= 2017 Burnie International =

- Date: 28 January–4 February
- Edition: 14th (men); 8th (women)
- Category: ATP Challenger Tour (men); ITF Women's Circuit (women)
- Prize money: $75,000 / $60,000
- Surface: Hard
- Location: Burnie, Tasmania, Australia
- Venue: Burnie Tennis Club

Champions

Men's singles
- (Australia) Omar Jasika

Women's singles
- (United States) Asia Muhammad

Men's doubles
- (United Kingdom) Brydan Klein / (Australia) Dane Propoggia

Women's doubles
- (Japan) Riko Sawayanagi / (Czech Republic) Barbora Štefková
- Burnie International

The 2017 Caterpillar Burnie International is a professional tennis tournament played on outdoor hard courts as part of the 2017 ATP Challenger Tour and the 2017 ITF Women's Circuit, offering a total of $75,000 in prize money for men and $60,000 for women. It was the fourteenth (for men) and eighth (for women) edition of the tournament, which returned to the tennis calendar after missing 2016 due to difficulty acquiring funds. It took place in Burnie, Tasmania, Australia, on 28 January–4 February 2017.

== Men's singles entrants ==
=== Seeds ===
Country	Player	Rank^{1}	Seed
JPN	Go Soeda	139	1
TPE	Jason Jung	163	2
AUS	Andrew Whittington	194	3
EGY	Mohamed Safwat	196	4
AUS	Matthew Barton	197	5
USA	Noah Rubin	200	6
KAZ	Alexander Bublik	207	7
JPN	Akira Santillan	211	8

- ^{1} Rankings as of 16 January 2017.

=== Other entrants ===
The following players received wildcards into the singles main draw:

- (Australia) Alex Bolt
- (Australia) Harry Bourchier
- (Australia) Matthew Ebden
- (Australia) Bradley Mousley

The following players received entry from the qualifying draw:

- (Australia) Maverick Banes
- (Australia) James Frawley
- (Australia) Greg Jones
- (Australia) Dayne Kelly

== Women's singles entrants ==
=== Seeds ===
Country	Player	Rank^{1}	Seed
CHN	Han Xinyun	111	1
USA	Taylor Townsend	130	2
RUS	Elizaveta Kulichkova	145	3
USA	Asia Muhammad	151	4
RUS	Anastasia Pivovarova	159	5
SLO	Tamara Zidanšek	160	6
CZE	Barbora Štefková	163	7
AUS	Arina Rodionova	178	8

- ^{1} Rankings as of 16 January 2017

=== Other entrants ===
The following players received wildcards into the singles main draw:

- (Australia) Naiktha Bains
- (Australia) Jaimee Fourlis
- (Australia) Olivia Tjandramulia
- (Australia) Sara Tomic

The following players received entry from the qualifying draw:

- (France) Tessah Andrianjafitrimo
- (United States) Alexandra Stevenson
- (Canada) Aleksandra Wozniak
- (Slovakia) Zuzana Zlochová

== Champions ==
=== Men's singles ===
- (Australia) Omar Jasika def. (Australia) Blake Mott 6–2, 6–2.

=== Women's singles ===
- (United States) Asia Muhammad def. (Australia) Arina Rodionova 6–2, 6–1.

=== Men's doubles ===
- (United Kingdom) Brydan Klein / (Australia) Dane Propoggia def. (Australia) Steven de Waard / (Australia) Luke Saville 6–3, 6–4.

=== Women's doubles ===
- (Japan) Riko Sawayanagi / (Czech Republic) Barbora Štefková def. (Australia) Alison Bai / (Thailand) Varatchaya Wongteanchai, 7–6^{(8–6)}, 4–6, [10–7].
