= 2016 Canberra Challenger =

- Date: 9–16 January 2016
- Edition: 1st
- Category: ATP Challenger Tour
- Prize money: $75,000
- Surface: Hard
- Location: Canberra, Australia

Champions

Singles
- (Italy) Paolo Lorenzi

Doubles
- (Poland) Mariusz Fyrstenberg / (Mexico) Santiago González
- Canberra Challenger

The 2016 Canberra Challenger was a professional tennis tournament played on outdoor hard courts. It was the first edition of the tournament, which was part of the 2016 ATP Challenger Tour. It took place in Canberra, Australia between 9 and 16 January 2016.

The tournament attracted 10 of the world's top 100 singles players, and although the 2016 edition was described as a "one-off" due to a gap in the events with the draw sizes changing in Sydney and Auckland, Tennis ACT boss Ross Triffitt campaigned for it to become a permanent fixture in the tennis calendar, succeeding in getting the event a spot in the 2017 ATP Challenger Tour schedule.

== Singles main draw entrants ==
=== Seeds ===
Country	Player	Rank^{1}	Seed
ITA	Paolo Lorenzi	68	1
COL	Santiago Giraldo	70	2
ESP	Daniel Muñoz de la Nava	75	3
ESP	Marcel Granollers	84	4
CRO	Ivan Dodig	87	5
ARG	Diego Schwartzman	88	6
RUS	Evgeny Donskoy	91	7
JPN	Taro Daniel	96	8

=== Other entrants ===
The following players received wildcards into the singles main draw:

- (Australia) Daniel Hobart
- (Australia) Alex De Minaur
- (Australia) Alexei Popyrin
- (Australia) Max Purcell

The following players received entry from the qualifying draw:

- (Belarus) Sergey Betov
- (Germany) Frank Moser
- (Australia) Daniel Nolan
- (Australia) Steven de Waard

== Champions ==
=== Men's singles ===
- (Italy) Paolo Lorenzi def. (Croatia) Ivan Dodig 6–2, 6–4

=== Men's doubles ===
- (Poland) Mariusz Fyrstenberg / (Mexico) Santiago González def. (Australia) Maverick Banes / (Australia) Jarryd Chaplin 7–6^{(7–3)}, 6–3
