= 2014 McDonald's Burnie International – Men's doubles =

Men's doubles
- 2014 McDonald's Burnie International

Final
- Champions: (Australia) Matt Reid (Australia) John-Patrick Smith
- Runners-up: (Japan) Toshihide Matsui (Thailand) Danai Udomchoke
- Score: 6–4, 6–2

Events
Singles	men	women
Doubles	men	women
- Burnie International

Ruan Roelofse and John-Patrick Smith were the defending champions but Roelofse decided not to participate.
Smith played alongside Matt Reid and won the title, defeating Toshihide Matsui and Danai Udomchoke in the final 6–4, 6–2.

== Seeds ==
1. (Australia) Matt Reid / (Australia) John-Patrick Smith (champions)
2. (United Kingdom) Brydan Klein / (Netherlands) Boy Westerhof (first round)
3. (Australia) Alex Bolt / (Australia) Andrew Whittington (semifinals)
4. (Australia) Ryan Agar / (Austria) Sebastian Bader (second round)

== Draw ==
Key

- Q = Qualifier
- WC = Wild card
- LL = Lucky loser
- Alt = Alternate
- ITF = ITF entry
- PR = Protected ranking
- SR = Special ranking
- SE = Special exempt
- JE = Junior exempt
- JR = Junior Accelerator Programme entrant
- CO = College Accelerator Programme entrant
- NG = Next Gen Accelerator Program entrant
- w/o = Walkover
- r = Retired
- d = Defaulted

=== Draw ===
First round
1	(Australia) M Reid (Australia) J-P Smith	6	6
PR	(France) M Chazal (Australia) C O'Connell	1	4
(Japan) H Moriya (Japan) K Takeuchi	3	4
(Australia) M Banes (Australia) Gavin van Peperzeel	6	6
3	(Australia) A Bolt (Australia) A Whittington	6	6
WC	(Thailand) Thanasit Issaraporn (Czech Republic) R Vögeli	1	2
WC	(Australia) A Hubble (Australia) D Propoggia	7	6
(Australia) M Barton (Australia) L Saville	5	2
(Japan) T Matsui (Thailand) D Udomchoke	6	6
(Australia) Jacob Grills (Australia) D Kelly	3	2
(Australia) B Mitchell (Australia) B Mousley	4	3
4	(Australia) R Agar (Austria) S Bader	6	6
(Japan) T Ito (Japan) B Sato	6	6
WC	(Australia) Daniel Ferreti (Australia) Aaron Leeder-Chard	4	4
(United States) J Jenkins (United States) M Krueger	6^{4}	7	[10]
2	(United Kingdom) B Klein (Netherlands) B Westerhof	7^{7}	5	[7]

Quarterfinals
1	(Australia) M Reid (Australia) J-P Smith	6	6
(Australia) M Banes (Australia) G van Peperzeel	1	2
3	(Australia) A Bolt (Australia) A Whittington	6	7
WC	(Australia) A Hubble (Australia) D Propoggia	4	5
(Japan) T Matsui (Thailand) D Udomchoke	6	6
4	(Australia) R Agar (Austria) S Bader	1	2
(Japan) T Ito (Japan) B Sato	6	6
(United States) J Jenkins (United States) M Krueger	4	3

Semifinals
1	(Australia) M Reid (Australia) J-P Smith	6	6
3	(Australia) A Bolt (Australia) A Whittington	4	2
(Japan) T Matsui (Thailand) D Udomchoke	7^{10}	7^{7}
(Japan) T Ito (Japan) B Sato	6^{8}	6^{5}

Final
1	(Australia) M Reid (Australia) J-P Smith	6	6
(Japan) T Matsui (Thailand) D Udomchoke	4	2
