= Matt Reid (tennis) =

Australian tennis player

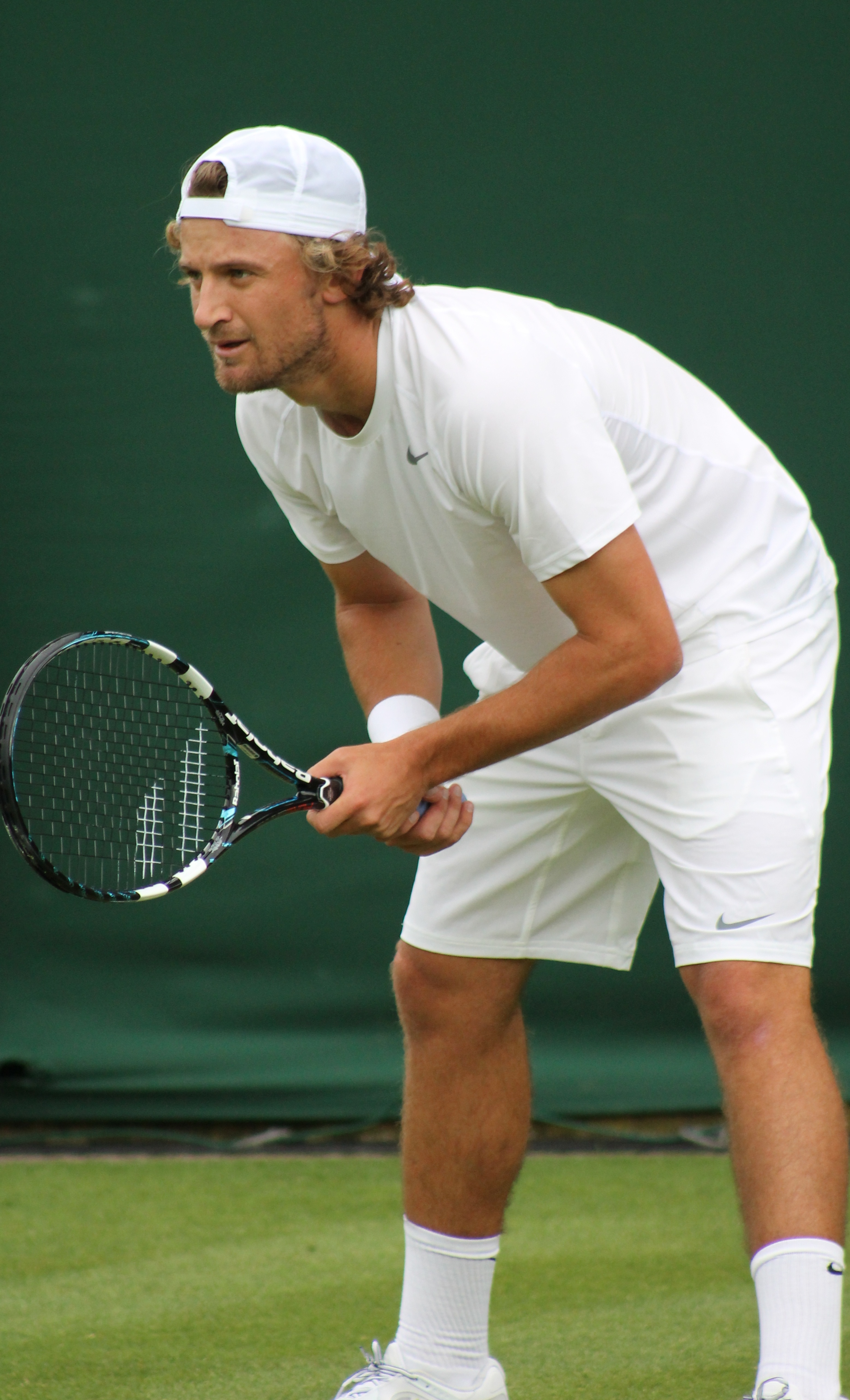
- Matt Reid at 2013 Wimbledon Championships
- Country (sports): Australia
- Residence: Galston, Australia
- Born: 17 July 1990 (age 36) Sydney, Australia
- Height: 1.83 m (6 ft 0 in)
- Turned pro: 2009
- Retired: 2022 (last match played)
- Plays: Right-handed
- Prize money: $692,569

Singles
- Career record: 0–1 (Grand Slam, ATP Tour level, and Davis Cup)
- Career titles: 0
- Highest ranking: No. 183 (3 February 2014)

Grand Slam singles results
- Australian Open: Q2 (2013)
- French Open: Q2 (2013)
- Wimbledon: 1R (2013)
- US Open: Q2 (2013)

Doubles
- Career record: 23–39
- Career titles: 0
- Highest ranking: No. 60 (11 September 2017)

Grand Slam doubles results
- Australian Open: 2R (2013, 2018, 2020)
- French Open: 2R (2020, 2021)
- Wimbledon: 2R (2017, 2019 2021)
- US Open: 2R (2017, 2019)

Grand Slam mixed doubles results
- Australian Open: 2R (2017)
- French Open: 1R (2017)

Matt Reid (born 17 July 1990) is a former Australian professional tennis player. His highest ATP singles ranking is world No. 183, which he reached on 3 February 2014. His career high in doubles was at world No. 60 set on 11 September 2017.

== Tennis career ==
As a junior, he was runner-up in the Wimbledon Boys Doubles in 2008 partnering Bernard Tomic.

He reached the second round of the Australian Open Men's Doubles in 2013 partnering Samuel Groth.

In 2013, Matt Reid made his Grand Slam main draw debut at Wimbledon after booking his spot through qualifying. He lost in round one in straight sets.

In February 2014, Reid won the Burnie Challenger, which increased his ranking to a career high of 183.

== ATP career finals ==
=== Doubles: 1 (1 runner-up) ===
Legend (doubles) Grand Slam Tournaments (0–0) ATP World Tour Finals (0–0) ATP World Tour Masters 1000 (0–0) ATP World Tour 500 Series (0–0) ATP World Tour 250 Series (0–1)	Finals by surface Hard (0–0) Clay (0–0) Grass (0–1)

Result	W–L	Date	Tournament	Tier	Surface	Partner	Opponents	Score
Loss	0–1	Jul 2017	Hall of Fame Tennis Championships, United States	250 Series	Grass	(Australia) John-Patrick Smith	(Pakistan) Aisam-ul-Haq Qureshi (United States) Rajeev Ram	4–6, 6–4, [7–10]

== Challenger and Futures finals ==
=== Singles: 16 (7–9) ===
Legend (singles) ATP Challenger Tour (1–1) ITF Futures Tour (6–8)	Titles by surface Hard (5–5) Clay (2–4) Grass (0–0) Carpet (0–0)

Result	W–L	Date	Tournament	Tier	Surface	Opponent	Score
Win	1–0	Aug 2009	USA F19, Godfrey	Futures	Hard	(United States) Alexander Domijan	6–7^{(7–9)}, 5–5 ret.
Loss	1–1	Aug 2009	USA F20, Decatur	Futures	Hard	(Spain) Arnau Brugués Davi	5–7, 2–6
Loss	1–2	May 2010	USA F10, Vero Beach	Futures	Clay	(Latvia) Kārlis Lejnieks	4–6, 4–6
Loss	1–3	Jun 2011	Germany F5, Köln	Futures	Clay	(Germany) Holger Fischer	2–6, 1–6
Win	2–3	Jul 2011	Serbia F3, Belgrade	Futures	Clay	(Croatia) Roko Karanušić	6–2, 6–0
Loss	2–4	Jul 2011	Spain F25, Gandia	Futures	Clay	(Spain) David Estruch	5–7, 4–6
Loss	2–5	Aug 2011	Spain F27, Xàtiva	Futures	Clay	(Venezuela) David Souto	2–6, 6–7^{(6–8)}
Win	3–5	Aug 2011	Romania F8, Cluj-Napoca	Futures	Clay	(Romania) Gabriel Moraru	1–6, 6–3, 6–0
Loss	3–6	Oct 2011	Australia F8, Esperance	Futures	Hard	(Australia) Benjamin Mitchell	1–6, 4–6
Win	4–6	Nov 2011	Australia F13, Bendigo	Futures	Hard	(Australia) Benjamin Mitchell	7–6^{(8–6)}, 4–6, 6–1
Loss	4–7	Jul 2012	Canada F4, Saskatoon	Futures	Hard	(New Zealand) Daniel King-Turner	3–6, 3–6
Win	5–7	Sep 2012	Australia F8, Port Pirie	Futures	Hard	(Australia) Adam Feeney	6–3, 3–6, 6–3
Loss	5–8	Mar 2013	Sydney, Australia	Challenger	Hard	(Australia) Nick Kyrgios	3–6, 2–6
Win	6–8	Feb 2014	Burnie, Australia	Challenger	Hard	(Japan) Hiroki Moriya	6–3, 6–2
Loss	6–9	Jul 2015	Canada F5, Vancouver	Futures	Hard	(United States) Andre Dome	3–6, 6–3, 4–6
Win	7–9	Aug 2015	Canada F6, Saskatoon	Futures	Hard	(Australia) Aleksandar Vukic	7–6^{(14–12)}, 6–1

=== Doubles: 55 (31–24) ===
Legend (doubles) ATP Challenger Tour (22–15) ITF Futures Tour (9–9)	Titles by surface Hard (23–19) Clay (3–2) Grass (3–1) Carpet (2–1)

Result	W–L	Date	Tournament	Tier	Surface	Partner	Opponents	Score
Win	1–0	Oct 2008	Australia F8, Traralgon	Futures	Hard	(Australia) Dane Propoggia	(Australia) Jared Easton (New Zealand) Mikal Statham	6–3, 6–4
Win	2–0	Oct 2008	Australia F9, Sale	Futures	Clay	(Australia) Dane Propoggia	(Australia) Andrew Gregory (Australia) Greg Jones	w/o
Loss	2–1	Oct 2008	Australia F10, Happy Valley	Futures	Hard	(Australia) Dane Propoggia	(Australia) Kaden Hensel (Australia) Adam Hubble	4–6, 6–7^{(3–7)}
Loss	2–2	Nov 2008	USA F29, Honolulu	Futures	Hard	(Netherlands) Igor Sijsling	(United States) James Ludlow (Sweden) Andreas Siljeström	0–6, 6–4, [4–10]
Loss	2–3	Dec 2008	Australia F12, Sorrento	Futures	Hard	(Australia) Dane Propoggia	(Australia) Kaden Hensel (Australia) Adam Hubble	6–7^{(2–7)}, 7–6^{(7–3)}, [3–10]
Loss	2–4	Jul 2009	USA F17, Peoria	Futures	Clay	(United States) Denis Zivkovic	(Canada) Vasek Pospisil (Canada) Milos Raonic	3–6, 4–6
Loss	2–5	Nov 2009	Australia F10, Kalgoorlie	Futures	Hard	(Australia) Dane Propoggia	(Australia) Brydan Klein (Australia) Robert Smeets	3–6, 6–7^{(5–7)}
Win	3–5	Dec 2009	Australia F11, Bendigo	Futures	Hard	(Australia) Dane Propoggia	(Australia) Colin Ebelthite (Australia) Sadik Kadir	6–4, 6–3
Loss	3–6	Sep 2010	Australia F5, Cairns	Futures	Hard	(Australia) Dayne Kelly	(Australia) Colin Ebelthite (Australia) Adam Feeney	0–6, 2–6
Loss	3–7	Sep 2010	Australia F7, Alice Springs	Futures	Hard	(Australia) Dane Propoggia	(Australia) Colin Ebelthite (Australia) Adam Feeney	4–6, 4–6
Win	4–7	Nov 2010	Australia F10, Kalgoorlie	Futures	Hard	(Australia) Joel Lindner	(Australia) Colin Ebelthite (Australia) Adam Feeney	7–6^{(7–5)}, 4–6, [10–6]
Win	5–7	Apr 2011	Australia F4, Bundaberg	Futures	Clay	(New Zealand) Michael Venus	(Canada) Érik Chvojka (New Zealand) Jose Statham	2–6, 6–2, [10–4]
Win	6–7	Nov 2012	Australia F12, Bendigo	Futures	Hard	(Australia) Adam Feeney	(Australia) Matthew Barton (Australia) Michael Look	6–1, 3–6, [14–12]
Win	7–7	Feb 2013	West Lakes, Australia	Challenger	Hard	(Australia) Sam Groth	(Australia) James Duckworth (Australia) Greg Jones	6–2, 6–4
Loss	7–8	Mar 2013	Kyoto, Japan	Challenger	Carpet (i)	(Australia) Chris Guccione	(India) Purav Raja (India) Divij Sharan	4–6, 5–7
Win	8–8	Apr 2013	León, Mexico	Challenger	Hard	(Australia) Chris Guccione	(India) Purav Raja (India) Divij Sharan	6–3, 7–5
Loss	8–9	Aug 2013	Aptos, USA	Challenger	Hard	(Australia) Chris Guccione	(Israel) Jonathan Erlich (Israel) Andy Ram	3–6, 7–6^{(8–6)}, [2–10]
Win	9–9	Oct 2013	Sacramento, USA	Challenger	Hard	(Australia) John-Patrick Smith	(United States) Jarmere Jenkins (United States) Donald Young	7–6^{(7–1)}, 4–6, [14–12]
Win	10–9	Feb 2014	Burnie, Australia	Challenger	Hard	(Australia) John-Patrick Smith	(Japan) Toshihide Matsui (Thailand) Danai Udomchoke	6–4, 6–2
Loss	10–10	Apr 2014	Australia F4, Melbourne	Futures	Clay	(Australia) Adam Hubble	(Australia) Bradley Mousley (Australia) Jordan Thompson	w/o
Loss	10–11	Oct 2014	Tiburon, USA	Challenger	Hard	(Australia) Carsten Ball	(United States) Bradley Klahn (Canada) Adil Shamasdin	5–7, 2–6
Win	11–11	Nov 2014	Yokohama, Japan	Challenger	Hard	(United States) Bradley Klahn	(New Zealand) Marcus Daniell (New Zealand) Artem Sitak	4–6, 6–4, [10–7]
Win	12–11	Feb 2015	Burnie, Australia	Challenger	Hard	(Australia) Carsten Ball	(Moldova) Radu Albot (Australia) Matthew Ebden	7–5, 6–4
Win	13–11	Mar 2014	Australia F1, Adelaide	Futures	Hard	(Australia) Carsten Ball	(Australia) Steven de Waard (Australia) Christopher O'Connell	6–4, 6–3
Win	14–11	Mar 2014	Australia F2, Port Pirie	Futures	Hard	(Australia) Carsten Ball	(Australia) Steven de Waard (Australia) Jacob Grills	5–7, 7–6^{(7–1)}, [10–7]
Win	15–11	Mar 2014	Australia F3, Mildura	Futures	Grass	(Australia) Carsten Ball	(Australia) Ryan Agar (Australia) Matthew Barton	6–2, 6–3
Loss	15–12	Aug 2015	Canada F6, Saskatoon	Futures	Hard	(United States) Patrick Davidson	(United States) Marcos Giron (United Kingdom) Farris Fathi Gosea	3–6, 2–6
Loss	15–13	Oct 2015	Tiburon, USA	Challenger	Hard	(Australia) Carsten Ball	(Sweden) Johan Brunström (Denmark) Frederik Nielsen	6–7^{(2–7)}, 1–6
Win	16–13	Nov 2015	Toyota, Japan	Challenger	Carpet (i)	(United Kingdom) Brydan Klein	(Italy) Riccardo Ghedin (Chinese Taipei) Yi Chu-huan	6–2, 7–6^{(7–3)}
Loss	16–14	Feb 2016	Launceston, Australia	Challenger	Hard	(Australia) Dayne Kelly	(Australia) Luke Saville (Australia) Jordan Thompson	1–6, 6–4, [11–13]
Win	17–14	May 2016	Seoul, Korea, Rep.	Challenger	Hard	(Australia) John-Patrick Smith	(China) Gong Maoxin (Chinese Taipei) Yi Chu-huan	6–3, 7–5
Win	18–14	Jul 2016	Binghamton, USA	Challenger	Hard	(Australia) John-Patrick Smith	(United Kingdom) Liam Broady (Brazil) Guilherme Clezar	6–4, 6–2
Win	19–14	Oct 2016	Tiburon, USA	Challenger	Hard	(Australia) John-Patrick Smith	(France) Quentin Halys (United States) Dennis Novikov	6–1, 6–2
Loss	19–15	Oct 2016	Stockton, USA	Challenger	Hard	(Australia) John-Patrick Smith	(United States) Brian Baker (Australia) Sam Groth	2–6, 6–4, [2–10]
Win	20–15	Oct 2016	Las Vegas, USA	Challenger	Hard	(United States) Brian Baker	(United States) Bjorn Fratangelo (United States) Denis Kudla	6–1, 7–5
Win	21–15	Oct 2016	Traralgon, Australia	Challenger	Hard	(Australia) John-Patrick Smith	(Australia) Matthew Barton (Australia) Matthew Ebden	6–4, 6–4
Loss	21–16	Nov 2016	Canberra, Australia	Challenger	Hard	(Australia) John-Patrick Smith	(Australia) Luke Saville (Australia) Jordan Thompson	2–6, 3–6
Win	22–16	Nov 2016	Toyota, Japan	Challenger	Carpet (i)	(Australia) John-Patrick Smith	(India) Jeevan Nedunchezhiyan (Indonesia) Christopher Rungkat	6–3, 6–4
Win	23–16	Feb 2017	San Francisco, USA	Challenger	Hard (i)	(Australia) John-Patrick Smith	(China) Gong Maoxin (China) Zhang Ze	6–7^{(4–7)}, 7–5, [10–7]
Loss	23–17	Mar 2017	Drummondville, Canada	Challenger	Hard (i)	(Australia) John-Patrick Smith	(Australia) Sam Groth (Canada) Adil Shamasdin	3–6, 6–2, [8–10]
Loss	23–18	Jun 2017	Nottingham, Great Britain	Challenger	Grass	(Australia) John-Patrick Smith	(United Kingdom) Ken Skupski (United Kingdom) Neal Skupski	6–7^{(1–7)}, 6–2, [7–10]
Win	24–18	Aug 2018	Aptos, USA	Challenger	Hard	(Australia) Thanasi Kokkinakis	(United Kingdom) Jonny O'Mara (United Kingdom) Joe Salisbury	6–2, 4–6, [10–8]
Win	25–18	Sep 2018	Cassis, France	Challenger	Hard	(Ukraine) Sergiy Stakhovsky	(Switzerland) Marc-Andrea Hüsler (Portugal) Gonçalo Oliveira	6–2, 6–3
Loss	25–19	Oct 2018	Calgary, Canada	Challenger	Hard (i)	(Australia) John-Patrick Smith	(United States) Robert Galloway (United States) Nathan Pasha	4–6, 6–4, [6–10]
Win	26–19	Nov 2018	Champaign, USA	Challenger	Hard (i)	(Australia) John-Patrick Smith	(Mexico) Hans Hach (Venezuela) Luis David Martínez	6–4, 4–6, [10–8]
Loss	26–20	Feb 2019	Chennai, India	Challenger	Hard	(Australia) Luke Saville	(Italy) Gianluca Mager (Italy) Andrea Pellegrino	3–6, 6–7^{(7–9)}
Loss	26–21	Mar 2019	Drummondville, Canada	Challenger	Hard (i)	(Australia) John-Patrick Smith	(United Kingdom) Scott Clayton (Canada) Adil Shamasdin	5–7, 6–3, [5–10]
Loss	26–22	Apr 2019	León, Mexico	Challenger	Hard	(Australia) John-Patrick Smith	(Austria) Lucas Miedler (Austria) Sebastian Ofner	6–4, 4–6, [6–10]
Win	27–22	May 2019	Puerto Vallarta, Mexico	Challenger	Hard	(Australia) John-Patrick Smith	(Ecuador) Gonzalo Escobar (Venezuela) Luis David Martínez	7–6^{(12–10)}, 6–3
Loss	27–23	Oct 2019	Ningbo Challenger, China	Challenger	Hard	(Australia) Alex Bolt	(Australia) Andrew Harris (Australia) Marc Polmans	0–6, 1–6
Win	28–23	Mar 2021	Biella, Italy	Challenger	Hard (i)	(United Kingdom) Lloyd Glasspool	(Ukraine) Denys Molchanov (Ukraine) Sergiy Stakhovsky	6–3, 6–4
Win	29-23	Apr 2021	Marbella, Spain	Challenger	Clay	(United Kingdom) Dominic Inglot	(Monaco) Romain Arneodo (Monaco) Hugo Nys	1–6, 6–3, [10–6]
Win	30-23	June 2021	Nottingham, UK	Challenger	Grass	(United Kingdom) Ken Skupski	(Australia) Matthew Ebden (Australia) John-Patrick Smith	4–6, 7–5, [10–6]
Win	31-23	June 2021	Nottingham, UK	Challenger	Grass	(Australia) Marc Polmans	(France) Benjamin Bonzi (France) Antoine Hoang	6–4, 4–6, [10–8]
Loss	31-24	Oct 2021	Alicante, Spain	Challenger	Hard	(Monaco) Romain Arneodo	(Ukraine) Denys Molchanov (Spain) David Vega Hernández	4-6, 2–6

== Performance timelines ==
Key
W	F	SF	QF	#R	RR	Q#	P#	DNQ	A	Z#	PO	G	S	B	NMS	NTI	P	NH

(W) winner; (F) finalist; (SF) semifinalist; (QF) quarterfinalist; (#R) rounds 4, 3, 2, 1; (RR) round-robin stage; (Q#) qualification round; (P#) preliminary round; (DNQ) did not qualify; (A) absent; (Z#) Davis/Fed Cup Zonal Group (with number indication) or (PO) play-off; (G) gold, (S) silver or (B) bronze Olympic/Paralympic medal; (NMS) not a Masters tournament; (NTI) not a Tier I tournament; (P) postponed; (NH) not held; (SR) strike rate (events won / competed); (W–L) win–loss record.
To avoid confusion and double counting, these charts are updated at the conclusion of a tournament or when the player's participation has ended.

=== Singles ===
Tournament	2009	2010	2011	2012	2013	2014	2015	W–L
Grand Slam tournaments
Australian Open	Q1	Q1	Q1	Q1	Q2	Q1	Q1	0–0
French Open	A	A	A	A	Q2	Q1	A	0–0
Wimbledon	A	A	A	A	1R	Q1	A	0–1
US Open	A	A	A	A	Q2	Q1	A	0–0
Win–loss	0–0	0–0	0–0	0–0	0–1	0–0	0–0	0–1

=== Doubles ===
Current through the 2022 Open 13.

Tournament	2009	2010	2011	2012	2013	2014	2015	2016	2017	2018	2019	2020	2021	2022	SR	W–L
Grand Slam tournaments
Australian Open	1R	1R	1R	1R	2R	1R	1R	A	1R	2R	1R	2R	1R	1R	0 / 13	3–13
French Open	A	A	A	A	A	A	A	A	1R	A	A	2R	2R	A	0 / 3	2–3
Wimbledon	A	A	A	A	A	A	A	A	2R	A	2R	NH	2R	A	0 / 3	3–3
US Open	A	A	A	A	A	A	A	A	2R	A	2R	A	1R	A	0 / 3	2–3
Win–loss	0–1	0–1	0–1	0–1	1–1	0–1	0–1	0–0	2–4	1–1	2–3	2–2	2–4	0–1	0 / 22	10–22
ATP World Tour Masters 1000
Miami Open	A	A	A	A	A	A	A	A	2R	1R	A	NH	A	A	0 / 2	1–2
Win–loss	0–0	0–0	0–0	0–0	0–0	0–0	0–0	0–0	1–1	0–1	0–0	0–0	0–0	0–0	0 / 2	1–2
Career statistics
Titles / Finals	0 / 0	0 / 0	0 / 0	0 / 0	0 / 0	0 / 0	0 / 0	0 / 0	0 / 1	0 / 0	0 / 0	0 / 0	0 / 0	0 / 0	0 / 0	0 / 1
Overall win–loss	0–1	0–1	0–1	0–1	1–1	0–1	1–2	2–3	11–14	2–4	5–8	3–4	7–10	3–5	35–56	
Year-end ranking	535	487	701	511	116	236	173	83	97	115	91	95	85	353	37%	

== Personal life ==
Reid previously dated Australian actress Rebel Wilson.
