= Blake Mott =

Australian tennis player

- Country (sports): Australia
- Residence: Melbourne, Australia
- Born: 21 April 1996 (age 30) Caringbah, Australia
- Height: 1.80 m (5 ft 11 in)
- Plays: Right-handed (double-handed backhand)
- Coach: Peter Luczak, Adam Kennedy
- Prize money: US $249,377

Singles
- Career record: 0–2
- Career titles: 0
- Highest ranking: No. 220 (12 June 2017)

Grand Slam singles results
- Australian Open: 1R (2017)
- Wimbledon: Q2 (2017)
- US Open: Q1 (2017)

Doubles
- Career record: 0–0
- Career titles: 0
- Highest ranking: No. 991 (23 May 2016)

Grand Slam mixed doubles results
- Australian Open: 1R (2020)

Blake Mott (born 21 April 1996) is a tennis coach and former Australian professional tennis player. He competed mainly in the Challenger Tour. He reached his career high singles ranking of World No. 220 on 12 June 2017. He won his first Challenger title in the 2016 Launceston Tennis International and made his Grand Slam debut at the 2017 Australian Open after qualifying.

== Career ==
=== 2011–2013: Career beginnings ===
Mott made his ITF debut in May 2011 in the Sweden F3. He lost in round 1 to Julian Obry. He played around Europe throughout 2011, scoring his first win against Aviv Ben Shabat in August 2011. Throughout 2012, Mott played on the ITF circuit winning two matches. Mott ended 2012 with a ranking of 1563.

In 2013, Mott began making second rounds of the ITF circuit and in July 2013, Mott qualified for his first ATP Challenger Tour main draw in Granby. He lost to Tatsuma Ito in round 1. In October 2013, Mott qualified for the 2013 Melbourne Challenger, winning his first Challenger matches against Nick Kyrgios and Jordan Thompson on the way to the quarter-final where he lost to number 1 seed Matthew Ebden. Mott ended 2013 with a ranking of 653.

=== 2014–2015: First ITF Finals ===
In 2014, Mott contested the 2014 Australian Open – Men's singles qualifying, losing to Enrique López Pérez. Mott returned to the Australian ITF circuit and in April, he reached his first final. He lost in straight sets against Alex Bolt. Mott travelled to Asia and attempted to qualify for four Challenger events, qualifying only for the Taipei Challenger;. He lost to Hiroki Moriya in round 1. Mott travelled to Europe and North America and reached his second career final in Canada in August where he lost to Liam Broady. Mott returned to Australia and played a number of ITF to complete the year.

In 2015, Mott was given wild cards in the qualifying rounds of the Brisbane International and Sydney International, but lost in round 1 of both. At the 2015 Australian Open – Men's singles qualifying, Mott defeated Arthur De Greef before losing to Alexander Kudryavtsev. The remainder of 2015 was spent across Australia and Asia on the ITF and Challenger Circuit. Mott ended 2015 with a ranking of 674.

=== 2016: First Challenger Title ===
In 2016, Mott commenced the year at the Canberra Challenger, losing to Marcel Granollers in round 1. In February Mott won his first Challenger title at the Launceston Challenger, after qualifying. Mott become the first player outside the world's top 700 to win an ATP Challenger title since Korea's Yong-Kyu Lim in 2010. The win increased Motts ranking 356 places to a career-high ranking of 365. Two weeks later, Mott reached the final of the Australian F1 at Port Pirie, but lost to Christopher O'Connell. Mott travelled to North America and competed on the ITF and Challenger Circuit for 6 months; reaching two ITF semi-finals in Canada. In October, Mott returned to Australia and reached the finals of the Australian F7; losing to Jarmere Jenkins and Christopher O'Connell. These results improved Mott's ranking to within the top 300. Mott ended 2016 with a ranking of 286.

=== 2017: Grand Slam debut and career break ===
Mott commenced 2017 with a wild card into the Happy Valley Challenger where he lost in round 1. Mott will make his grand slam debut at the 2017 Australian Open after qualifying. After qualifying, Mott said; "It's amazing stuff. To be playing in my first grand slam in my home country where I grew up playing tennis, watching on TV all those years – this is truly special." Mott lost in straight sets to 18th seed Richard Gasquet in round 1. In February, Mott reached his second Challenger Final in Burnie where he lost to compatriot Omar Jasika. In March, Mott travelled to Asia where he qualified for and reached the semi-final of the Keio Challenger, before reaching the final of the Australia F2 final. In May, Mott travelled to Europe where he reached the semi-final of Venice Challenge Save Cup. He lost in the second round at 2017 Wimbledon Championships – Men's singles qualifying and first round at 2017 US Open – Men's singles qualifying. This would be Mott's last match in two years as he commenced a career hiatus. Mott ended 2017 with a ranking of 281.

=== 2018–2019: Hiatus and return ===
In July 2019, Mott announced he intention to return to the sport in September, after a 2-year hiatus; after rediscovered his passion for the sport. He won an ITF title in his return tournament. In December 2019, Mott broke his wrist while playing in the 2020 Australian Open wildcard playoff.

In January 2021, Mott lost in the first round of 2021 Australian Open – Men's singles qualifying.

== ATP Challenger and ITF Futures finals ==
=== Singles: 14 (5–9) ===
Legend ATP Challenger (1–1) ITF Futures (4–8)	Finals by surface Hard (5–7) Clay (0–2) Grass (0–0) Carpet (0–0)

Result	W–L	Date	Tournament	Tier	Surface	Opponent	Score
Loss	0–1	Apr 2014	Australia F4, Melbourne	Futures	Clay	(Australia) Alex Bolt	3–6, 2–6
Loss	0–2	Aug 2014	Canada F8, Winnipeg	Futures	Hard	(United Kingdom) Liam Broady	3–6, 4–6
Win	1–2	Feb 2016	Launceston, Australia	Challenger	Hard	(Kazakhstan) Andrey Golubev	6–7^{(4–7)}, 6–1, 6–2
Loss	1–3	Feb 2016	Australia F1, Port Pirie	Futures	Hard	(Australia) Christopher O'Connell	6–7^{(6–8)}, 6–3, 2–6
Loss	1–4	Oct 2016	Australia F7, Toowoomba	Futures	Hard	(United States) Jarmere Jenkins	6–7^{(7–6)}, 6–7 ^{(7–2)}
Loss	1–5	Oct 2016	Australia F8, Cairns	Futures	Hard	(Australia) Christopher O'Connell	6–0, 2–6, 4–6
Loss	1–6	Feb 2017	Burnie, Australia	Challenger	Hard	(Australia) Omar Jasika	2–6, 2–6
Loss	1–7	Mar 2017	Australia F2, Canberra	Futures	Clay	(Australia) Marc Polmans	6–7, 6–3, 4–6
Win	2–7	Sep 2019	M25 Cairns, Australia	World Tennis Tour	Hard	(Ukraine) Vladyslav Orlov	7–5, 6–2
Win	3–7	Sep 2019	M25 Darwin, Australia	World Tennis Tour	Hard	(Australia) Calum Puttergill	6–1, 6–4
Loss	3–8	Aug 2023	M25 Jakarta, Indonesia	World Tennis Tour	Hard	(Sweden) Leo Borg	2–6, 0–6
Win	4–8	Sep 2023	M25 Darwin, Australia	World Tennis Tour	Hard	(Australia) Blake Ellis	6–4, 6–1
Win	5–8	Sep 2023	M25 Darwin, Australia	World Tennis Tour	Hard	(Australia) Jake Delaney	6–2, 2–6, 6–3
Loss	5–9	Nov 2024	M25 Brisbane, Australia	World Tennis Tour	Hard	(Australia) Blake Ellis	1–6, 3–6

=== Doubles: 2 (0–2) ===
Legend ATP Challenger (0–0) ITF Futures (0–2)	Finals by surface Hard (0–0) Clay (0–2) Grass (0–0) Carpet (0–0)

Result	W–L	Date	Tournament	Tier	Surface	Partner	Opponents	Score
Loss	0–1	May 2012	Sweden F2, Båstad	Futures	Clay	(Australia) Peter Luczak	(Estonia) Vladimir Ivanov (Poland) Andriej Kapaś	4–6, 7–5, [4–10]
Loss	0–2	May 2012	Czech Republic F3, Jablonec nad Nisou	Futures	Clay	(Australia) Peter Luczak	(Czech Republic) Jaroslav Pospíšil (Czech Republic) Jiří Veselý	5–7, 4–6

== Performance timeline ==
Key
W	F	SF	QF	#R	RR	Q#	DNQ	A	NH

(W) winner; (F) finalist; (SF) semifinalist; (QF) quarterfinalist; (#R) rounds 4, 3, 2, 1; (RR) round-robin stage; (Q#) qualification round; (DNQ) did not qualify; (A) absent; (NH) not held; (SR) strike rate (events won / competed); (W–L) win–loss record.
To avoid confusion and double counting, these charts are updated at the conclusion of a tournament or when the player's participation has ended.

Current through the 2021 Murray River Open.

=== Singles ===
Tournament	2014	2015	2016	2017	2018	2019	2020	2021	2022	2023	2024	SR	W–L	Win %
Grand Slam tournaments
Australian Open	Q1	Q2	A	1R	A	A	Q2	Q1	A	A	A	0 / 1	0–1	0%
French Open	A	A	A	A	A	A	A	A	A	A	A	0 / 0	0–0	–
Wimbledon	A	A	A	Q2	A	A	NH	A	A	A	A	0 / 0	0–0	–
US Open	A	A	A	Q1	A	A	A	A	A	A	A	0 / 0	0–0	–
Win–loss	0–0	0–0	0–0	0–1	0–0	0–0	0–0	0–0				0 / 1	0–1	0%
Career statistics
Overall win–loss	0–0	0–0	0–0	0–1	0–0	0–0	0–0	0–1	0–0	0–0	0–0	0–2		0%
Year-end ranking	582	674	286	280	–	514	475	843	981	407		$240,909		
