= Omar Jasika =

Australian tennis player (born 1997)

- Country (sports): Australia
- Residence: Melbourne, Australia
- Born: 18 May 1997 (age 29) Clarinda, Victoria
- Height: 1.83 m (6 ft 0 in)
- Turned pro: 2014
- Plays: Left (two-handed backhand)
- Coach: Admir Jasika
- Prize money: $801,497

Singles
- Career record: 1–5
- Highest ranking: No. 177 (25 November 2024)
- Current ranking: No. 492 (3 August 2026)

Grand Slam singles results
- Australian Open: 2R (2016)
- French Open: Q1 (2024, 2025)
- Wimbledon: Q1 (2024, 2025)
- US Open: Q1 (2025)

Doubles
- Career record: 3–3
- Highest ranking: No. 220 (23 May 2016)
- Current ranking: No. 1,800 (3 August 2026)

Grand Slam doubles results
- Australian Open: 2R (2015)

Grand Slam mixed doubles results
- Australian Open: 1R (2025)
- Last updated on: 7 August 2026.

Omar Jasika (Bosnian pronunciation: [jǎsika]; born 18 May 1997) is an Australian professional tennis player. Jasika has a career-high ATP singles ranking of No. 177, achieved on 25 November 2024 and a best doubles ranking of No. 220, reached on 23 May 2016.

Jasika is the 2014 US Open boys' singles champion. He along with Naoki Nakagawa also won the 2014 US Open boys' doubles title defeating Rafael Matos and João Menezes in the final. In winning both, Jasika became the first player in 28 years to win both the boys’ singles and doubles events at the US Open. He is also the 2025 Australian Open 1 Point Slam champion.

== Personal life ==
Jasika was born in Clarinda, Victoria. He is of Bosnian descent. His parents, Admir and Bina, emigrated from Bosnia and Herzegovina to Australia during the Bosnian War before Omar was born. He is the eldest child in his family and his brother, Amor, is also an aspiring professional tennis player. Jasika began playing tennis at the age of six. He attended South Oakleigh College throughout his schooling years.

== Professional tour ==
=== 2014: ATP Tour debut ===
After his success at the US Open, Jasika made his ATP World Tour debut in September, after he was given a wildcard into the Malaysian Open. He drew Rajeev Ram in round one, and won the first set, and was within 2 points of the match in the second, before losing in three sets. In October, Jasika made his first final at the Australia F7 in Cairns.

=== 2015: First ITF title ===
Jasika commenced 2015 at the Onkaparina Challenger where he drew No.1 seed and world No. 80 Blaž Rola. He lost in three sets. Jasika competed in the qualifying for the Australian Open, when he won two rounds, but lost in the final round to Marius Copil.

In February, he played in the Australia Futures 1 tournament, where he lost in the final to Brydan Klein. In March, Jasika headed to China where he made the final round of qualifying in both Guangzhou and Shenzhen Challengers before heading to Guadeloupe where he qualified for and made the quarterfinal of the Guadeloupe Challenger.

In May, Jasika won his first ITF title in Changwon. In July, Jasika won his second ITF title in Kelowna, dropping just one set along the way.

=== 2016: Major debut ===
Jasika made his Grand Slam debut at the 2016 Australian Open after being awarded a wildcard. He won his first round match, beating Illya Marchenko in four sets; he subsequently lost to former finalist Jo-Wilfried Tsonga in the following round in straight sets.

Jasika spent the remainder of the year predominantly on the Futures circuit across North America and Europe, making numerous quarter and semifinals, but no finals. In December, Jasika won the Australian Open wildcard play-off, earning him direct entry into the 2017 Australian Open. Jesica ended the year with a ranking of No. 367.

=== 2017: First Challenger title ===
Jasika commenced the year with a wildcard into the Happy Valley Challenger where he reached his first ATP Challenger Tour final. At the 2017 Australian Open, Jasika lost in the first round to David Ferrer. In February, Jasika won his first Challenger title in Burnie. In March, Jasika returned to the ITF circuit in Australia, reaching the semi-final of the F2 in Canberra. In July, Jasika travelled to North America and competed on the Challenger Circuit, winning just one match. In September, Jasika reached the quarterfinal of Shanghai Challenger and in October, the quarterfinal of the Canberra Challenger. Jasika ended 2017 with a ranking of No. 276.

=== 2018–2019: Two-year suspension for positive test for drugs ===
Jasika commenced the season by reaching the quarterfinal of the Playford Challenger before losing in the first round of the 2018 Australian Open – Men's singles qualifying.

Jasika was suspended from professional tennis by ASADA for two years until March 2020.

=== 2020–2021: Return from suspension, loss of form due to COVID ===
In March, Jasika returned from suspension at the ITF tournament held in Geelong, Australia, losing in the first round of qualifying. His career was then stalled by the COVID-19 pandemic.

=== 2022–2024: Back to Australian Open ===
In February, Jasika played his first professional match since his suspension at the ITF tournament in Canberra, where he reached the quarterfinals. In March, in his fourth tournament back, Jasika won the ITF tournament in Bendigo. Following this, he won an ITF tournament in Chiang Rai, Thailand, in April. Overall, he won five ITF tournaments since his return in 2022. Jasika reached the final at the 2022 Nonthaburi Challenger II in Thailand but lost to Arthur Cazaux.

At the 2023 Australian Open, Jasika lost in the first qualification round to Denis Kudla.

He also had to qualify for the 2024 Australian Open but this time he overcame the last hurdle defeating Abedallah Shelbayh in the round three qualifying match and reached the main draw after an absence of seven years. Jasika also competed in the 2024 French Open – Men's singles qualifying losing to Dalibor Svrcina in straight sets. At the 2024 Wimbledon Championships – Men's singles qualifying he lost to Zizou Bergs also in straight sets.

He would go on to claim five ITF futures titles in a row, two in Indonesia and three in Australia which would result in a 29 match unbeaten run. His streak would end at the quarterfinal stage at the 2024 City of Playford Tennis International, where he was defeated by eventual champion Rinky Hijikata in three tight sets. Jasika would go on to finish the year off at a career high ranking of world No. 177 on 25 November 2024.

=== 2025: Australian Open wildcard ===
Jasika received a wildcard into the main draw at the 2025 Australian Open, losing to Hugo Gaston in the first round. However, he won the inaugural Australian Open 1 Point Slam title, defeating Priscilla Hon in the final and winning $60,000 in prize money.

== ITIA two-year ban ==
In September 2018, he was suspended from professional tennis by ASADA for two years after having tested positive for cocaine in December 2017. Jasika was eligible to play again in March 2020.

== ATP Challenger Tour finals ==
=== Singles: 4 (2 titles, 2 runner-ups) ===
Legend ATP Challenger (2–2)

Result	W–L	Date	Tournament	Tier	Surface	Opponent	Score
Loss	0–1	Jan 2017	Happy Valley Challenger, Australia	Challenger	Hard	(Germany) Peter Gojowczyk	3–6, 1–6
Win	1–1	Feb 2017	Burnie International, Australia	Challenger	Hard	(Australia) Blake Mott	6–2, 6–2
Loss	1–2	Sep 2022	Nonthaburi Challenger II, Thailand	Challenger	Hard	(France) Arthur Cazaux	6–7^{(6–8)}, 4–6
Win	2–2	Feb 2024	Burnie International, Australia (2)	Challenger	Hard	(Australia) Alex Bolt	6–2, 6–7^{(2–7)}, 6–3

=== Doubles: 1 (runner-up) ===
Legend ATP Challenger (0–1)

Result	W–L	Date	Tournament	Tier	Surface	Partner	Opponents	Score
Loss	0–1	Nov 2015	Traralgon Challenger, Australia	Challenger	Hard	(Australia) Bradley Mousley	(Australia) Dayne Kelly (Australia) Marinko Matosevic	5–7, 2–6

== ITF Tour finals ==
=== Singles: 24 (19 titles, 5 runner-ups) ===
Legend ITF Futures/WTT (19–5)	Finals by surface Hard (18–4) Clay (0–1) Grass (1–0)

Result	W–L	Date	Tournament	Tier	Surface	Opponent	Score
Loss	0–1	Oct 2014	Australia F7, Cairns	Futures	Hard	(United States) Jarmere Jenkins	6–3, 3–6, 4–6
Loss	0–2	Mar 2015	Australia F5, Adelaide	Futures	Hard	(United Kingdom) Brydan Klein	4–6, 7–6^{(7–3)}, 2–6
Win	1–2	May 2015	Korea F2, Changwon	Futures	Hard	(United States) Connor Smith	6–3, 6–4
Win	2–2	Jul 2015	Canada F4, Kelowna	Futures	Hard	(United States) Eric Quigley	3–6, 6–4, 7–6^{(7–4)}
Win	3–2	Mar 2022	M25 Bendigo, Australia	WTT	Hard	(Australia) James McCabe	6–1, 6–2
Loss	3–3	Mar 2022	M25 Canberra, Australia	WTT	Clay	(Australia) Jason Kubler	6–1, 3–6, 6–7^{(4–7)}
Win	4–3	Apr 2022	M15 Chiang Rai, Thailand	WTT	Hard	(Australia) Dayne Kelly	6–1, 7–6^{(7–1)}
Win	5–3	May 2022	M15 Heraklion, Greece	WTT	Hard	(United Kingdom) Charles Broom	7–5, 6–3
Win	6–3	Jun 2022	M15 Heraklion, Greece	WTT	Hard	(Switzerland) Jérôme Kym	6–2, 6–2
Loss	6–4	Sep 2022	M25 Darwin, Australia	WTT	Hard	(Australia) Dane Sweeny	3–6, 7–6^{(7–4)}, 4–6
Win	7–4	Nov 2022	M25 Traralgon, Australia	WTT	Hard	(Australia) Dayne Kelly	6–0, 6–2
Win	8–4	Jun 2023	M15 Jakarta, Indonesia	WTT	Hard	(Indonesia) Justin Barki	6–2, 6–3
Win	9–4	Oct 2023	M25 Cairns, Australia	WTT	Hard	(Australia) Jake Delaney	6–7^{(4–7)}, 6–4, 6–4
Win	10–4	Feb 2024	M25 Traralgon, Australia	WTT	Hard	(Australia) Li Tu	7–6^{(7–1)}, 6–2
Win	11–4	Aug 2024	M15 Bali, Indonesia	WTT	Hard	(United Kingdom) Max Basing	6–3, 3–6, 7–6^{(7–2)}
Win	12–4	Sep 2024	M25 Bali, Indonesia	WTT	Hard	(United Kingdom) Jay Clarke	6–4, 6–1
Win	13–4	Sep 2024	M25 Darwin, Australia	WTT	Hard	(Australia) Jake Delaney	7–5, 7–5
Win	14–4	Sep 2024	M25 Darwin, Australia	WTT	Hard	(New Zealand) James Watt	1–6, 6–3, 6–4
Win	15–4	Oct 2024	M25 Cairns, Australia	WTT	Hard	(Australia) Marc Polmans	6–3, 6–4
Loss	15–5	Feb 2025	M25 Burnie, Australia	WTT	Hard	(Australia) Jason Kubler	3–6, 2–6
Win	16–5	Mar 2025	M25 Mildura, Australia	WTT	Grass	(Australia) Pavle Marinkov	6–3, 6–4
Win	17–5	Jul 2026	M15 Tokyo, Japan	WTT	Hard	(Japan) Koki Matsuda	4–6, 6–0, 6–1
Win	18–5	Jul 2026	M15 Brisbane, Australia	WTT	Hard	(Australia) Moerani Bouzige	7–6^{(9–7)}, 6–3
Win	19–5	Aug 2026	M15 Tianjin, China	WTT	Hard	(Japan) Kosuke Ogura	7–6^{(7–3)}, 6–2

=== Doubles: 2 (1 title, 1 runner-up) ===
Legend ITF Futures/WTT (1–1)

Result	W–L	Date	Tournament	Tier	Surface	Partner	Opponents	Score
Win	1–0	May 2016	Croatia F5, Bol	Futures	Clay	(Australia) Bradley Mousley	(Netherlands) Tallon Griekspoor (Germany) Tobias Simon	7–5, 7–6
Loss	1–1	May 2022	M25 Nottingham, United Kingdom	WTT	Hard	(Israel) Edan Leshem	(United Kingdom) Julian Cash (United Kingdom) Henry Patten	3–6, 7–5, [2–10]

== ITF Junior Circuit ==
=== ITF Junior finals ===
==== Singles: 4 (2 titles, 2 runners-up) ====
Legend
Grand Slam (1–0)
Grade A (0–0)
Grade B (0–0)
Grade 1–5 (1–2)

Result	No.	Date	Tournament	Surface	Opponent	Score
Loss	1.	30 July 2011	Auckland, New Zealand	Hard	(New Zealand) Chris Simich	5–7, 4–6
Win	1.	10 March 2013	Nonthaburi, Thailand	Hard	(United Kingdom) Cameron Norrie	7–5, 6–4
Loss	2.	16 January 2014	Traralgon, Australia	Hard	(Germany) Alexander Zverev	5–7, 2–6
Win	2.	7 September 2014	New York City, United States	Hard	(France) Quentin Halys	2–6, 7–5, 6–1

=== Junior Grand Slam finals ===
==== Singles: 1 (title) ====
Result	Year	Tournament	Surface	Opponent	Score
Win	2014	US Open	Hard	(France) Quentin Halys	2–6, 7–5, 6–1

==== Doubles: 1 (title) ====
Result	Year	Tournament	Surface	Partner	Opponents	Score
Win	2014	US Open	Hard	(Japan) Naoki Nakagawa	(Brazil) Rafael Matos (Brazil) João Menezes	6–3, 7–6^{(8–6)}

== Performance timelines ==
Key
W	F	SF	QF	#R	RR	Q#	DNQ	A	NH

(W) winner; (F) finalist; (SF) semifinalist; (QF) quarterfinalist; (#R) rounds 4, 3, 2, 1; (RR) round-robin stage; (Q#) qualification round; (DNQ) did not qualify; (A) absent; (NH) not held; (SR) strike rate (events won / competed); (W–L) win–loss record.
To avoid confusion and double counting, these charts are updated at the conclusion of a tournament or when the player's participation has ended.

=== Singles ===
Tournament	2015	2016	2017	2018	2019	2020	2021	2022	2023	2024	2025	2026	SR	W–L	Win%
Grand Slam tournaments
Australian Open	Q3	2R	1R	Q1	A	A	A	A	Q1	1R	1R	Q1	0 / 4	1–4	20%
French Open	A	A	A	A	A	A	A	A	A	Q1	Q1		0 / 0	0–0	–
Wimbledon	A	A	A	A	A	NH	A	A	A	Q1	Q1		0 / 0	0–0	–
US Open	A	A	A	A	A	A	A	A	A	A	Q1		0 / 0	0–0	–
Win–loss	0–0	1–1	0–1	0–0	0–0	0–0	0–0	0–0	0–0	0–1	0–1	0–0	0 / 4	1–4	20%
ATP Masters 1000
Indian Wells Masters	A	A	A	A	A	NH	A	A	A	A	A		0 / 0	0–0	–
Miami Open	Q2	Q2	A	A	A	NH	A	A	A	A	A		0 / 0	0–0	–
Monte Carlo Masters	A	A	A	A	A	NH	A	A	A	A	A		0 / 0	0–0	–
Madrid Open	A	A	A	A	A	NH	A	A	A	A	A		0 / 0	0-0	–
Italian Open	A	A	A	A	A	A	A	A	A	A	A		0 / 0	0–0	–
Canadian Open	A	A	A	A	A	NH	A	A	A	A	A		0 / 0	0–0	–
Cincinnati Masters	A	A	A	A	A	A	A	A	A	A	Q1		0 / 0	0–0	–
Shanghai Masters	A	A	A	A	A	NH			Q1	A	Q1		0 / 0	0–0	–
Paris Masters	A	A	A	A	A	A	A	A	A	A	A		0 / 0	0–0	–
Win–loss	0–0	0–0	0–0	0–0	0–0	0–0	0–0	0–0	0–0	0–0	0–0	0–0	0 / 0	0–0	–

=== Doubles ===
Tournament	2015	2016	2017	2018	2019	2020	2021	SR	W–L	Win %
Grand Slam tournaments
Australian Open	2R	1R	A	A	A	A	A	0 / 2	1–2	33%
French Open	A	A	A	A	A	A	A	0 / 0	0–0	–
Wimbledon	A	A	A	A	A	NH	A	0 / 0	0–0	–
US Open	A	A	A	A	A	A	A	0 / 0	0–0	–
Win–loss	1–1	0–1	0–0	0–0	0–0	0–0	0–0	0 / 2	1–2	33%
ATP Tour Masters 1000
Miami Open	A	QF	A	A	A	A	A	0 / 1	2–1	67%
Win–loss	0–0	2–1	0–0	0–0	0–0	0–0	0–0	0 / 1	2–1	67%
