= 2014 ITF Women's Circuit (January–March) =

Women's tennis tour

The 2014 ITF Women's Circuit is the 2014 edition of the second-tier tour for women's professional tennis. It is organised by the International Tennis Federation and is a tier below the WTA Tour. The ITF Women's Circuit includes tournaments with prize money ranging from $10,000 up to $100,000.

== Key ==
$100,000 tournaments
$75,000 tournaments
$50,000 tournaments
$25,000 tournaments
$15,000 tournaments
$10,000 tournaments
All titles

== Month ==
=== January ===
Week of	Tournament	Winner	Runners-up	Semifinalists	Quarterfinalists
December 30	Hong Kong; Hard $25,000; Singles and doubles draw	(Russia) Elizaveta Kulichkova; 6–2, 6–2	(Kazakhstan) Zarina Diyas	(France) Pauline Parmentier (China) Zhang Yuxuan	(Japan) Mayo Hibi (Japan) Eri Hozumi (Ukraine) Olga Savchuk (China) Han Xinyun
December 30	Hong Kong; Hard $25,000; Singles and doubles draw	(Japan) Misa Eguchi (Japan) Eri Hozumi; 6–4, 6–2	(Kazakhstan) Zarina Diyas (Hong Kong) Zhang Ling	(France) Pauline Parmentier (China) Zhang Yuxuan	(Japan) Mayo Hibi (Japan) Eri Hozumi (Ukraine) Olga Savchuk (China) Han Xinyun
January 6	Vero Beach, United States; Clay $25,000; Singles and doubles draw	(Germany) Laura Siegemund; 6–3, 7–6^{(12–10)}	(Canada) Gabriela Dabrowski	(United States) Allie Kiick (Russia) Polina Vinogradova	(Hungary) Réka-Luca Jani (United States) Samantha Crawford (Germany) Anne Schäfer (Bulgaria) Elitsa Kostova
January 6	Vero Beach, United States; Clay $25,000; Singles and doubles draw	(Russia) Irina Khromacheva (United States) Allie Will; 7–5, 6–3	(United States) Jacqueline Cako (United States) Sanaz Marand	(United States) Allie Kiick (Russia) Polina Vinogradova	(Hungary) Réka-Luca Jani (United States) Samantha Crawford (Germany) Anne Schäfer (Bulgaria) Elitsa Kostova
January 6	Fort-de-France, Martinique, France; Hard $10,000; Singles and doubles draws	(France) Irina Ramialison; 6–4, 6–2	(France) Sherazad Benamar	(Lithuania) Akvilė Paražinskaitė (Italy) Camilla Rosatello	(France) Brandy Mina (Croatia) Silvia Njirić (France) Manon Peral (Canada) Khristina Blajkevitch
January 6	Fort-de-France, Martinique, France; Hard $10,000; Singles and doubles draws	(France) Manon Peral (Italy) Camilla Rosatello; 6–4, 6–4	(Netherlands) Rosalie van der Hoek (Lithuania) Akvilė Paražinskaitė	(Lithuania) Akvilė Paražinskaitė (Italy) Camilla Rosatello	(France) Brandy Mina (Croatia) Silvia Njirić (France) Manon Peral (Canada) Khristina Blajkevitch
January 6	Aurangabad, India; Clay $10,000; Singles and doubles draws	(India) Sowjanya Bavisetti; 5–7, 6–4, 6–4	(India) Prarthana Thombare	(India) Prerna Bhambri (India) Nidhi Chilumula	(India) Ankita Raina (India) Rutuja Bhosale (India) Rishika Sunkara (India) Natasha Palha
January 6	Aurangabad, India; Clay $10,000; Singles and doubles draws	(India) Ankita Raina (India) Prarthana Thombare; 6–3, 6–3	(India) Shweta Rana (India) Rishika Sunkara	(India) Prerna Bhambri (India) Nidhi Chilumula	(India) Ankita Raina (India) Rutuja Bhosale (India) Rishika Sunkara (India) Natasha Palha
January 13	Port St. Lucie, United States; Clay $25,000; Singles and doubles draw	(Canada) Françoise Abanda; 6–3, 6–4	(Canada) Heidi El Tabakh	(Serbia) Teodora Mirčić (Germany) Laura Siegemund	(United States) Jamie Loeb (Russia) Irina Khromacheva (Japan) Mari Osaka (Japan) Nao Hibino
January 13	Port St. Lucie, United States; Clay $25,000; Singles and doubles draw	(Hungary) Réka-Luca Jani (Russia) Irina Khromacheva; 6–4, 6–4	(United States) Jan Abaza (United States) Louisa Chirico	(Serbia) Teodora Mirčić (Germany) Laura Siegemund	(United States) Jamie Loeb (Russia) Irina Khromacheva (Japan) Mari Osaka (Japan) Nao Hibino
January 13	Sharm el-Sheikh, Egypt; Hard $10,000; Singles and doubles draws	(Turkey) İpek Soylu; 6–3, 7–6^{(7–0)}	(Greece) Despina Papamichail	(Japan) Yuuki Tanaka (Switzerland) Conny Perrin	(Bosnia and Herzegovina) Dea Herdželaš (Italy) Valeria Prosperi (Austria) Janina Toljan (China) Yang Zi
January 13	Sharm el-Sheikh, Egypt; Hard $10,000; Singles and doubles draws	(Turkey) Melis Sezer (Turkey) İpek Soylu; 4–6, 6–4, [10–3]	(Greece) Despina Papamichail (Italy) Gaia Sanesi	(Japan) Yuuki Tanaka (Switzerland) Conny Perrin	(Bosnia and Herzegovina) Dea Herdželaš (Italy) Valeria Prosperi (Austria) Janina Toljan (China) Yang Zi
January 13	Saint Martin, Guadeloupe, France; Hard $10,000; Singles and doubles draws	(Chinese Taipei) Hsu Ching-wen; 4–6, 6–4, 6–0	(Canada) Sonja Molnar	(France) Sherazad Benamar (France) Léa Tholey	(United States) Danielle Mills (Italy) Camilla Rosatello (United States) Denise Muresan (United States) Maia Magill
January 13	Saint Martin, Guadeloupe, France; Hard $10,000; Singles and doubles draws	(Canada) Khristina Blajkevitch (France) Brandy Mina; 7–5, 6–2	(France) Chloé Paquet (France) Léa Tholey	(France) Sherazad Benamar (France) Léa Tholey	(United States) Danielle Mills (Italy) Camilla Rosatello (United States) Denise Muresan (United States) Maia Magill
January 13	Stuttgart-Stammheim, Germany; Hard (indoor) $10,000; Singles and doubles draws	(Liechtenstein) Kathinka von Deichmann; 6–4, 6–4	(Bulgaria) Julia Terziyska	(Switzerland) Lara Michel (Germany) Laura Schaeder	(Switzerland) Karin Kennel (Germany) Yana Morderger (Germany) Lena Rüffer (Bulgaria) Borislava Botusharova
January 13	Stuttgart-Stammheim, Germany; Hard (indoor) $10,000; Singles and doubles draws	(Germany) Carolin Daniels (Germany) Laura Schaeder; 4–6, 6–1, [10–7]	(Switzerland) Karin Kennel (Germany) Lisa Ponomar	(Switzerland) Lara Michel (Germany) Laura Schaeder	(Switzerland) Karin Kennel (Germany) Yana Morderger (Germany) Lena Rüffer (Bulgaria) Borislava Botusharova
January 13	Tinajo, Spain; Hard $10,000; Singles and doubles draws	(Italy) Anastasia Grymalska; 6–3, 6–3	(South Africa) Natasha Fourouclas	(Austria) Barbara Haas (Spain) Arabela Fernández Rabener	(Italy) Claudia Giovine (Austria) Pia König (Italy) Alice Matteucci (France) Alice Bacquié
January 13	Tinajo, Spain; Hard $10,000; Singles and doubles draws	(Netherlands) Charlotte van der Meij (Netherlands) Kelly Versteeg; 2–6, 7–6^{(7–5)}, [10–6]	(Italy) Claudia Giovine (Italy) Alice Matteucci	(Austria) Barbara Haas (Spain) Arabela Fernández Rabener	(Italy) Claudia Giovine (Austria) Pia König (Italy) Alice Matteucci (France) Alice Bacquié
January 13	Glasgow, United Kingdom; Hard (indoor) $10,000; Singles and doubles draws	(United Kingdom) Tara Moore; 6–3, 6–1	(France) Myrtille Georges	(United Kingdom) Katy Dunne (United Kingdom) Jade Windley	(United Kingdom) Anna Smith (Italy) Angelica Moratelli (Czech Republic) Martina Borecká (Switzerland) Tess Sugnaux
January 13	Glasgow, United Kingdom; Hard (indoor) $10,000; Singles and doubles draws	(United Kingdom) Jocelyn Rae (United Kingdom) Anna Smith; 4–6, 6–2, [10–4]	(Czech Republic) Martina Borecká (Czech Republic) Tereza Malíková	(United Kingdom) Katy Dunne (United Kingdom) Jade Windley	(United Kingdom) Anna Smith (Italy) Angelica Moratelli (Czech Republic) Martina Borecká (Switzerland) Tess Sugnaux
January 20	Andrézieux-Bouthéon, France; Hard (indoor) $25,000; Singles and doubles draw	(Switzerland) Timea Bacsinszky; 6–1, 6–1	(Belgium) Ysaline Bonaventure	(Serbia) Doroteja Erić (Estonia) Anett Kontaveit	(Netherlands) Cindy Burger (Ukraine) Yuliya Beygelzimer (France) Stéphanie Foretz Gacon (France) Pauline Parmentier
January 20	Andrézieux-Bouthéon, France; Hard (indoor) $25,000; Singles and doubles draw	(Ukraine) Yuliya Beygelzimer (Ukraine) Kateryna Kozlova; 6–3, 3–6, [10–8]	(Switzerland) Timea Bacsinszky (Germany) Kristina Barrois	(Serbia) Doroteja Erić (Estonia) Anett Kontaveit	(Netherlands) Cindy Burger (Ukraine) Yuliya Beygelzimer (France) Stéphanie Foretz Gacon (France) Pauline Parmentier
January 20	Sunderland, United Kingdom; Hard (indoor) $25,000; Singles and doubles draws	(Belgium) An-Sophie Mestach; 6–1, 6–4	(Switzerland) Viktorija Golubic	(Russia) Valeria Savinykh (Czech Republic) Tereza Smitková	(Turkey) Çağla Büyükakçay (Republic of Ireland) Amy Bowtell (Germany) Carina Witthöft (United Kingdom) Tara Moore
January 20	Sunderland, United Kingdom; Hard (indoor) $25,000; Singles and doubles draws	(United Kingdom) Jocelyn Rae (United Kingdom) Anna Smith; 6–1, 6–1	(Hungary) Ágnes Bukta (Bulgaria) Viktoriya Tomova	(Russia) Valeria Savinykh (Czech Republic) Tereza Smitková	(Turkey) Çağla Büyükakçay (Republic of Ireland) Amy Bowtell (Germany) Carina Witthöft (United Kingdom) Tara Moore
January 20	Daytona Beach, United States; Clay $25,000; Singles and doubles draws	(Georgia (country)) Anna Tatishvili; 6–1, 6–3	(United States) Allie Kiick	(Germany) Laura Siegemund (Romania) Cristina Dinu	(United States) Taylor Townsend (United States) Louisa Chirico (Canada) Stéphanie Dubois (Czech Republic) Kateřina Kramperová
January 20	Daytona Beach, United States; Clay $25,000; Singles and doubles draws	(United States) Nicole Melichar (Serbia) Teodora Mirčić; 6–7^{(5–7)}, 7–6^{(7–1)}, [10–1]	(United States) Asia Muhammad (United States) Allie Will	(Germany) Laura Siegemund (Romania) Cristina Dinu	(United States) Taylor Townsend (United States) Louisa Chirico (Canada) Stéphanie Dubois (Czech Republic) Kateřina Kramperová
January 20	Sharm el-Sheikh, Egypt; Hard $10,000; Singles and doubles draws	(Hong Kong) Zhang Ling; 6–1, 7–5	(Russia) Polina Leykina	(Russia) Darya Kasatkina (Turkey) İpek Soylu	(China) Yang Zi (Japan) Yuuki Tanaka (Switzerland) Conny Perrin (Ukraine) Veronika Kapshay
January 20	Sharm el-Sheikh, Egypt; Hard $10,000; Singles and doubles draws	(Ukraine) Valentyna Ivakhnenko (Ukraine) Veronika Kapshay; 3–6, 6–4, [10–5]	(Turkey) Melis Sezer (Turkey) İpek Soylu	(Russia) Darya Kasatkina (Turkey) İpek Soylu	(China) Yang Zi (Japan) Yuuki Tanaka (Switzerland) Conny Perrin (Ukraine) Veronika Kapshay
January 20	Petit-Bourg, Guadeloupe, France; Hard $10,000; Singles and doubles draws	(France) Sherazad Benamar; 3–6, 6–3, 6–1	(Canada) Khristina Blajkevitch	(United States) Denise Muresan (France) Audrey Albié	(Israel) Keren Shlomo (United States) Ryann Foster (France) Alice Ramé (Canada) Wendy Zhang
January 20	Petit-Bourg, Guadeloupe, France; Hard $10,000; Singles and doubles draws	(Chinese Taipei) Hsu Ching-wen (Canada) Wendy Zhang; 7–5, 6–0	(France) Audrey Albié (France) Manon Peral	(United States) Denise Muresan (France) Audrey Albié	(Israel) Keren Shlomo (United States) Ryann Foster (France) Alice Ramé (Canada) Wendy Zhang
January 20	Kaarst, Germany; Carpet (indoor) $10,000; Singles and doubles draws	(Slovenia) Nastja Kolar; 4–6, 6–1, 6–4	(Russia) Natela Dzalamidze	(Germany) Laura Schaeder (Russia) Veronika Kudermetova	(Switzerland) Tess Sugnaux (Germany) Hanna Landener (Netherlands) Angelique van der Meet (Germany) Linda Prenkovic
January 20	Kaarst, Germany; Carpet (indoor) $10,000; Singles and doubles draws	(Ukraine) Olga Ianchuk (Slovenia) Nastja Kolar; 7–5, 6–3	(Germany) Vivian Heisen (Germany) Linda Prenkovic	(Germany) Laura Schaeder (Russia) Veronika Kudermetova	(Switzerland) Tess Sugnaux (Germany) Hanna Landener (Netherlands) Angelique van der Meet (Germany) Linda Prenkovic
January 20	Tinajo, Spain; Hard $10,000; Singles and doubles draws	(Italy) Claudia Giovine; 6–3, 0–6, 6–2	(Spain) Laura Pous Tió	(Colombia) Yuliana Lizarazo (Romania) Ioana Loredana Roșca	(Spain) Yvonne Cavallé Reimers (Belgium) Elise Mertens (Spain) Arabela Fernández Rabener (Norway) Melanie Stokke
January 20	Tinajo, Spain; Hard $10,000; Singles and doubles draws	(Italy) Deborah Chiesa (Colombia) Yuliana Lizarazo; 6–2, 3–6, [13–11]	(Spain) Arabela Fernández Rabener (Belgium) Elise Mertens	(Colombia) Yuliana Lizarazo (Romania) Ioana Loredana Roșca	(Spain) Yvonne Cavallé Reimers (Belgium) Elise Mertens (Spain) Arabela Fernández Rabener (Norway) Melanie Stokke
January 27	McDonald's Burnie International; Burnie, Australia; Hard $50,000; Singles – Doubles	(Japan) Misa Eguchi; 4–6, 6–2, 6–3	(Russia) Elizaveta Kulichkova	(France) Irena Pavlovic (Russia) Arina Rodionova	(Poland) Magda Linette (Australia) Olivia Rogowska (Italy) Jasmine Paolini (Australia) Ellen Perez
January 27	McDonald's Burnie International; Burnie, Australia; Hard $50,000; Singles – Doubles	(Australia) Jarmila Gajdošová (Australia) Storm Sanders; 6–4, 6–4	(Japan) Eri Hozumi (Japan) Miki Miyamura	(France) Irena Pavlovic (Russia) Arina Rodionova	(Poland) Magda Linette (Australia) Olivia Rogowska (Italy) Jasmine Paolini (Australia) Ellen Perez
January 27	Sharm el-Sheikh, Egypt; Hard $10,000; Singles and doubles draws	(Russia) Darya Kasatkina; 6–3, 6–4	(Czech Republic) Pernilla Mendesová	(Ukraine) Valentyna Ivakhnenko (Russia) Polina Leykina	(Austria) Janina Toljan (Serbia) Barbara Bonić (United Kingdom) Emily Webley-Smith (Italy) Valeria Prosperi
January 27	Sharm el-Sheikh, Egypt; Hard $10,000; Singles and doubles draws	(Ukraine) Valentyna Ivakhnenko (Ukraine) Veronika Kapshay; 7–6^{(7–5)}, 6–2	(Russia) Polina Leykina (Greece) Despina Papamichail	(Ukraine) Valentyna Ivakhnenko (Russia) Polina Leykina	(Austria) Janina Toljan (Serbia) Barbara Bonić (United Kingdom) Emily Webley-Smith (Italy) Valeria Prosperi
January 27	Tinajo, Spain; Hard $10,000; Singles and doubles draws	(Spain) Laura Pous Tió; 6–0, 6–3	(South Africa) Natasha Fourouclas	(Spain) Arabela Fernández Rabener (Belgium) Elise Mertens	(Russia) Valeria Savinykh (Japan) Yumi Nakano (Greece) Maria Sakkari (Netherlands) Quirine Lemoine
January 27	Tinajo, Spain; Hard $10,000; Singles and doubles draws	(Romania) Ioana Loredana Roșca (Japan) Hikari Yamamoto; 6–1, 6–1	(Spain) Arabela Fernández Rabener (Belgium) Elise Mertens	(Spain) Arabela Fernández Rabener (Belgium) Elise Mertens	(Russia) Valeria Savinykh (Japan) Yumi Nakano (Greece) Maria Sakkari (Netherlands) Quirine Lemoine
January 27	Antalya, Turkey; Clay $10,000; Singles and doubles draws	(Belarus) Sviatlana Pirazhenka; 6–3, 6–1	(Bosnia and Herzegovina) Jasmina Tinjić	(Romania) Irina Maria Bara (Hungary) Vanda Lukács	(Romania) Gabriela Talabă (France) Victoria Muntean (Romania) Patricia Maria Țig (Georgia (country)) Ekaterine Gorgodze
January 27	Antalya, Turkey; Clay $10,000; Singles and doubles draws	(Belarus) Sviatlana Pirazhenka (Ukraine) Alyona Sotnikova; 7–5, 1–6, [10–7]	(Romania) Irina Maria Bara (Romania) Diana Buzean	(Romania) Irina Maria Bara (Hungary) Vanda Lukács	(Romania) Gabriela Talabă (France) Victoria Muntean (Romania) Patricia Maria Țig (Georgia (country)) Ekaterine Gorgodze

=== February ===
Week of	Tournament	Winner	Runners-up	Semifinalists	Quarterfinalists
February 3	Launceston Tennis International; Launceston, Australia; Hard $50,000; Singles – Doubles	(Australia) Olivia Rogowska; 5–7, 6–4, 6–0	(France) Irena Pavlovic	(Japan) Eri Hozumi (Japan) Erika Sema	(Australia) Azra Hadzic (United Kingdom) Naomi Broady (China) Zhang Yuxuan (Russia) Elizaveta Kulichkova
February 3	Launceston Tennis International; Launceston, Australia; Hard $50,000; Singles – Doubles	(Australia) Monique Adamczak (Australia) Olivia Rogowska; 6–2, 6–4	(Thailand) Kamonwan Buayam (Slovakia) Zuzana Zlochová	(Japan) Eri Hozumi (Japan) Erika Sema	(Australia) Azra Hadzic (United Kingdom) Naomi Broady (China) Zhang Yuxuan (Russia) Elizaveta Kulichkova
February 3	Grenoble, France; Hard (indoor) $25,000; Singles and doubles draws	(France) Pauline Parmentier; 2–6, 6–0, 6–4	(Ukraine) Anastasiya Vasylyeva	(France) Constance Sibille (Ukraine) Kateryna Kozlova	(Switzerland) Amra Sadiković (Serbia) Doroteja Erić (France) Harmony Tan (Italy) Giulia Gatto-Monticone
February 3	Grenoble, France; Hard (indoor) $25,000; Singles and doubles draws	(Georgia (country)) Sofia Shapatava (Ukraine) Anastasiya Vasylyeva; 6–1, 6–4	(Russia) Margarita Gasparyan (Ukraine) Kateryna Kozlova	(France) Constance Sibille (Ukraine) Kateryna Kozlova	(Switzerland) Amra Sadiković (Serbia) Doroteja Erić (France) Harmony Tan (Italy) Giulia Gatto-Monticone
February 3	Sharm el-Sheikh, Egypt; Hard $10,000; Singles and doubles draws	(Belgium) Marie Benoît; 6–3, 6–4	(China) Gai Ao	(Switzerland) Sara Ottomano (Russia) Anastasia Pribylova	(Belgium) Magali Kempen (Russia) Anna Morgina (Switzerland) Karin Kennel (Japan) Nagi Hanatani
February 3	Sharm el-Sheikh, Egypt; Hard $10,000; Singles and doubles draws	(China) Gai Ao (India) Natasha Palha; 6–4, 6–1	(Slovakia) Dagmara Bašková (Netherlands) Janneke Wikkerink	(Switzerland) Sara Ottomano (Russia) Anastasia Pribylova	(Belgium) Magali Kempen (Russia) Anna Morgina (Switzerland) Karin Kennel (Japan) Nagi Hanatani
February 3	Tinajo, Spain; Hard $10,000; Singles and doubles draws	(Spain) Laura Pous Tió; 6–3, 3–6, 6–2	(Italy) Anna Remondina	(China) Lu Jiajing (Russia) Yana Buchina	(Germany) Anna Klasen (Romania) Ioana Loredana Roșca (Spain) Inés Ferrer Suárez (United Kingdom) Eleanor Dean
February 3	Tinajo, Spain; Hard $10,000; Singles and doubles draws	(Canada) Petra Januskova (China) Lu Jiajing; 7–5, 5–7, [10–6]	(Belgium) Elise Mertens (Netherlands) Bernice van de Velde	(China) Lu Jiajing (Russia) Yana Buchina	(Germany) Anna Klasen (Romania) Ioana Loredana Roșca (Spain) Inés Ferrer Suárez (United Kingdom) Eleanor Dean
February 3	Antalya, Turkey; Clay $10,000; Singles and doubles draws	(Romania) Patricia Maria Țig; 5–7, 6–1, 6–3	(Ukraine) Alyona Sotnikova	(Romania) Laura-Ioana Andrei (Germany) Lisa Ponomar	(Serbia) Milana Špremo (Belarus) Sviatlana Pirazhenka (Georgia (country)) Sofia Kvatsabaia (Georgia (country)) Ekaterine Gorgodze
February 3	Antalya, Turkey; Clay $10,000; Singles and doubles draws	(Bosnia and Herzegovina) Anita Husarić (Ukraine) Alyona Sotnikova; 5–7, 6–4, [10–6]	(Romania) Laura-Ioana Andrei (Belarus) Sviatlana Pirazhenka	(Romania) Laura-Ioana Andrei (Germany) Lisa Ponomar	(Serbia) Milana Špremo (Belarus) Sviatlana Pirazhenka (Georgia (country)) Sofia Kvatsabaia (Georgia (country)) Ekaterine Gorgodze
February 10	Dow Corning Tennis Classic; Midland, United States; Hard (indoor) $100,000; Singles – Doubles	(United Kingdom) Heather Watson; 6–4, 6–0	(Russia) Ksenia Pervak	(Canada) Sharon Fichman (Sweden) Sofia Arvidsson	(Poland) Urszula Radwańska (Serbia) Vesna Dolonc (Belarus) Olga Govortsova (United States) Lauren Davis
February 10	Dow Corning Tennis Classic; Midland, United States; Hard (indoor) $100,000; Singles – Doubles	(Georgia (country)) Anna Tatishvili (United Kingdom) Heather Watson; 7–5, 5–7, [10–6]	(Canada) Sharon Fichman (United States) Maria Sanchez	(Canada) Sharon Fichman (Sweden) Sofia Arvidsson	(Poland) Urszula Radwańska (Serbia) Vesna Dolonc (Belarus) Olga Govortsova (United States) Lauren Davis
February 10	São Paulo, Brazil; Clay $25,000; Singles and doubles draws	(Liechtenstein) Stephanie Vogt; 6–1, 6–4	(Russia) Marina Melnikova	(Germany) Dinah Pfizenmaier (Colombia) Mariana Duque	(Argentina) María Irigoyen (Venezuela) Adriana Pérez (Spain) Beatriz García Vidagany (Peru) Bianca Botto
February 10	São Paulo, Brazil; Clay $25,000; Singles and doubles draws	(Spain) Beatriz García Vidagany (Germany) Dinah Pfizenmaier; 7–6^{(10–8)}, 4–6, [10–8]	(Colombia) Mariana Duque (Brazil) Paula Cristina Gonçalves	(Germany) Dinah Pfizenmaier (Colombia) Mariana Duque	(Argentina) María Irigoyen (Venezuela) Adriana Pérez (Spain) Beatriz García Vidagany (Peru) Bianca Botto
February 10	Rancho Santa Fe, United States; Hard $25,000; Singles and doubles draws	(Austria) Tamira Paszek; 6–1, 6–1	(Japan) Shuko Aoyama	(United States) Sanaz Marand (Canada) Gabriela Dabrowski	(United States) Chieh-Yu Hsu (Japan) Mayo Hibi (United States) Danielle Lao (United States) Emma Christine Higuchi
February 10	Rancho Santa Fe, United States; Hard $25,000; Singles and doubles draws	(United States) Samantha Crawford (China) Xu Yifan; 3–6, 6–2, [12–10]	(United States) Danielle Lao (United States) Keri Wong	(United States) Sanaz Marand (Canada) Gabriela Dabrowski	(United States) Chieh-Yu Hsu (Japan) Mayo Hibi (United States) Danielle Lao (United States) Emma Christine Higuchi
February 10	Tallinn, Estonia; Hard (indoor) $15,000; Singles and doubles draws	(Switzerland) Timea Bacsinszky; 6–3, 6–3	(Estonia) Anett Kontaveit	(Ukraine) Ganna Poznikhirenko (Russia) Polina Vinogradova	(Denmark) Karen Barbat (Netherlands) Eva Wacanno (Germany) Nina Zander (Belarus) Lidziya Marozava
February 10	Tallinn, Estonia; Hard (indoor) $15,000; Singles and doubles draws	(Georgia (country)) Sofia Shapatava (Slovenia) Maša Zec Peškirič; 6–4, 7–6^{(7–4)}	(Hungary) Ágnes Bukta (Bulgaria) Viktoriya Tomova	(Ukraine) Ganna Poznikhirenko (Russia) Polina Vinogradova	(Denmark) Karen Barbat (Netherlands) Eva Wacanno (Germany) Nina Zander (Belarus) Lidziya Marozava
February 10	Sharm el-Sheikh, Egypt; Hard $10,000; Singles and doubles draws	(China) Gai Ao; 5–7, 7–6^{(7–4)}, 6–2	(Switzerland) Karin Kennel	(Belgium) Marie Benoît (Montenegro) Ana Veselinović	(Italy) Beatrice Lombardo (Belgium) Elena Van Der Sypt (Romania) Elena-Teodora Cadar (Russia) Eugeniya Pashkova
February 10	Sharm el-Sheikh, Egypt; Hard $10,000; Singles and doubles draws	(Russia) Eugeniya Pashkova (Montenegro) Ana Veselinović; 2–6, 6–0, [10–4]	(Italy) Giulia Bruzzone (Romania) Elena-Teodora Cadar	(Belgium) Marie Benoît (Montenegro) Ana Veselinović	(Italy) Beatrice Lombardo (Belgium) Elena Van Der Sypt (Romania) Elena-Teodora Cadar (Russia) Eugeniya Pashkova
February 10	Tinajo, Spain; Hard $10,000; Singles and doubles draws	(United Kingdom) Eleanor Dean; 6–1, 6–7^{(2–7)}, 7–6^{(7–3)}	(Lithuania) Akvilė Paražinskaitė	(Italy) Anna Remondina (France) Jade Suvrijn	(China) Lu Jiajing (France) Chloé Paquet (Germany) Anna Klasen (United States) Madison Westby
February 10	Tinajo, Spain; Hard $10,000; Singles and doubles draws	(United States) Hadley Berg (United States) Madison Westby; 6–4, 6–2	(Japan) Yoshimi Kawasaki (Japan) Yumi Nakano	(Italy) Anna Remondina (France) Jade Suvrijn	(China) Lu Jiajing (France) Chloé Paquet (Germany) Anna Klasen (United States) Madison Westby
February 10	Stockholm, Sweden; Hard (indoor) $10,000; Singles and doubles draws	(Ukraine) Olga Ianchuk; 6–0, 6–0	(Czech Republic) Kateřina Vaňková	(Belgium) Klaartje Liebens (Sweden) Cornelia Lister	(Sweden) Ellen Allgurin (France) Marine Partaud (Slovakia) Zuzana Luknárová (Germany) Nora Niedmers
February 10	Stockholm, Sweden; Hard (indoor) $10,000; Singles and doubles draws	(Germany) Carolin Daniels (Russia) Margarita Lazareva; 7–5, 6–3	(Germany) Luisa Marie Huber (Germany) Nora Niedmers	(Belgium) Klaartje Liebens (Sweden) Cornelia Lister	(Sweden) Ellen Allgurin (France) Marine Partaud (Slovakia) Zuzana Luknárová (Germany) Nora Niedmers
February 10	Nonthaburi, Thailand; Hard $10,000; Singles and doubles draws	(Thailand) Nudnida Luangnam; 6–3, 6–4	(China) Wen Xin	(Thailand) Kamonwan Buayam (Hong Kong) Zhang Ling	(South Korea) Kang Seo-kyung (Japan) Miyu Kato (China) Han Xinyun (China) Zhang Kailin
February 10	Nonthaburi, Thailand; Hard $10,000; Singles and doubles draws	(Thailand) Varatchaya Wongteanchai (Hong Kong) Zhang Ling; 2–6, 6–2, [12–10]	(China) Tang Haochen (China) Tian Ran	(Thailand) Kamonwan Buayam (Hong Kong) Zhang Ling	(South Korea) Kang Seo-kyung (Japan) Miyu Kato (China) Han Xinyun (China) Zhang Kailin
February 10	Antalya, Turkey; Clay $10,000; Singles and doubles draws	(Romania) Patricia Maria Țig; 6–3, 6–2	(Georgia (country)) Sofia Kvatsabaia	(Slovakia) Lenka Juríková (Romania) Irina Maria Bara	(China) Yang Zhaoxuan (Georgia (country)) Ekaterine Gorgodze (Bulgaria) Julia Stamatova (Germany) Christina Shakovets
February 10	Antalya, Turkey; Clay $10,000; Singles and doubles draws	(China) Li Yihong (China) Zhu Lin; 6–2, ret.	(Romania) Gabriela Talabă (Romania) Patricia Maria Țig	(Slovakia) Lenka Juríková (Romania) Irina Maria Bara	(China) Yang Zhaoxuan (Georgia (country)) Ekaterine Gorgodze (Bulgaria) Julia Stamatova (Germany) Christina Shakovets
February 17	ONGC–GAIL Delhi Open; New Delhi, India; Hard $25,000; Singles – Doubles	(China) Wang Qiang; 6–1, 6–3	(Ukraine) Yuliya Beygelzimer	(Belarus) Ilona Kremen (Ukraine) Olga Savchuk	(Japan) Erika Sema (Japan) Yurika Sema (India) Ankita Raina (Thailand) Varatchaya Wongteanchai
February 17	ONGC–GAIL Delhi Open; New Delhi, India; Hard $25,000; Singles – Doubles	(Thailand) Nicha Lertpitaksinchai (Thailand) Peangtarn Plipuech; 7–6^{(7–5)}, 6–3	(Japan) Erika Sema (Japan) Yurika Sema	(Belarus) Ilona Kremen (Ukraine) Olga Savchuk	(Japan) Erika Sema (Japan) Yurika Sema (India) Ankita Raina (Thailand) Varatchaya Wongteanchai
February 17	Moscow, Russia; Hard (indoor) $25,000; Singles and doubles draws	(Belarus) Aliaksandra Sasnovich; 6–3, 6–2	(Estonia) Anett Kontaveit	(Russia) Margarita Gasparyan (Russia) Ksenia Pervak	(Georgia (country)) Sofia Shapatava (Russia) Mayya Katsitadze (Russia) Shakhlo Saidova (Russia) Natela Dzalamidze
February 17	Moscow, Russia; Hard (indoor) $25,000; Singles and doubles draws	(Ukraine) Valentyna Ivakhnenko (Ukraine) Kateryna Kozlova; 7–6^{(8–6)}, 6–4	(Russia) Veronika Kudermetova (Belarus) Sviatlana Pirazhenka	(Russia) Margarita Gasparyan (Russia) Ksenia Pervak	(Georgia (country)) Sofia Shapatava (Russia) Mayya Katsitadze (Russia) Shakhlo Saidova (Russia) Natela Dzalamidze
February 17	Kreuzlingen, Switzerland; Carpet (indoor) $25,000; Singles and doubles draws	(Netherlands) Michaëlla Krajicek; 6–4, 7–6^{(7–5)}	(Switzerland) Timea Bacsinszky	(Czech Republic) Petra Krejsová (Russia) Ekaterina Alexandrova	(Serbia) Aleksandra Krunić (Slovakia) Rebecca Šramková (Germany) Kristina Barrois (Germany) Tayisiya Morderger
February 17	Kreuzlingen, Switzerland; Carpet (indoor) $25,000; Singles and doubles draws	(Czech Republic) Eva Birnerová (Netherlands) Michaëlla Krajicek; 6–1, 4–6, [10–6]	(Serbia) Aleksandra Krunić (Switzerland) Amra Sadiković	(Czech Republic) Petra Krejsová (Russia) Ekaterina Alexandrova	(Serbia) Aleksandra Krunić (Slovakia) Rebecca Šramková (Germany) Kristina Barrois (Germany) Tayisiya Morderger
February 17	Nottingham, United Kingdom; Hard (indoor) $25,000; Singles and doubles draw	(Russia) Ekaterina Bychkova; 3–0, ret.	(France) Pauline Parmentier	(Czech Republic) Renata Voráčová (Croatia) Ana Vrljić	(Latvia) Diāna Marcinkēviča (United Kingdom) Tara Moore (Germany) Carina Witthöft (Netherlands) Angelique van der Meet
February 17	Nottingham, United Kingdom; Hard (indoor) $25,000; Singles and doubles draw	(United Kingdom) Jocelyn Rae (United Kingdom) Anna Smith; 7–6^{(8–6)}, 6–4	(United Kingdom) Naomi Broady (Czech Republic) Renata Voráčová	(Czech Republic) Renata Voráčová (Croatia) Ana Vrljić	(Latvia) Diāna Marcinkēviča (United Kingdom) Tara Moore (Germany) Carina Witthöft (Netherlands) Angelique van der Meet
February 17	Surprise, United States; Hard $25,000; Singles and doubles draws	(Serbia) Jovana Jakšić; 4–6, 7–6^{(15–13)}, 7–5	(Austria) Tamira Paszek	(United States) Julia Boserup (Sweden) Sofia Arvidsson	(Canada) Aleksandra Wozniak (United States) Sanaz Marand (Japan) Mayo Hibi (United States) Louisa Chirico
February 17	Surprise, United States; Hard $25,000; Singles and doubles draws	(Japan) Shuko Aoyama (Japan) Eri Hozumi; 6–3, 7–5	(United States) Sanaz Marand (United States) Ashley Weinhold	(United States) Julia Boserup (Sweden) Sofia Arvidsson	(Canada) Aleksandra Wozniak (United States) Sanaz Marand (Japan) Mayo Hibi (United States) Louisa Chirico
February 17	Salisbury, Australia; Hard $15,000; Singles and doubles draws	(South Korea) Jang Su-jeong; 6–3, 7–6^{(8–6)}	(China) Wang Yafan	(Japan) Misa Eguchi (Japan) Hiroko Kuwata	(Chinese Taipei) Hsu Wen-hsin (Slovakia) Zuzana Zlochová (Australia) Viktorija Rajicic (Australia) Alison Bai
February 17	Salisbury, Australia; Hard $15,000; Singles and doubles draws	(Japan) Misa Eguchi (Japan) Miki Miyamura; 6–2, 6–2	(South Korea) Jang Su-jeong (South Korea) Lee So-ra	(Japan) Misa Eguchi (Japan) Hiroko Kuwata	(Chinese Taipei) Hsu Wen-hsin (Slovakia) Zuzana Zlochová (Australia) Viktorija Rajicic (Australia) Alison Bai
February 17	Altenkirchen, Germany; Carpet (indoor) $15,000; Singles and doubles draws	(Belarus) Iryna Shymanovich; 6–1, 7–6^{(7–3)}	(Hungary) Réka-Luca Jani	(Germany) Carolin Daniels (Czech Republic) Kateřina Vaňková	(Germany) Laura Schaeder (Italy) Verena Hofer (China) Lu Jiajing (Czech Republic) Pernilla Mendesová
February 17	Altenkirchen, Germany; Carpet (indoor) $15,000; Singles and doubles draws	(Germany) Carolin Daniels (Germany) Laura Schaeder; 1–6, 6–4, [10–7]	(Italy) Claudia Giovine (Germany) Justine Ozga	(Germany) Carolin Daniels (Czech Republic) Kateřina Vaňková	(Germany) Laura Schaeder (Italy) Verena Hofer (China) Lu Jiajing (Czech Republic) Pernilla Mendesová
February 17	Buenos Aires, Argentina; Clay $10,000; Singles and doubles draws	(South Africa) Chanel Simmonds; 6–2, 6–2	(Russia) Yuliya Kalabina	(Argentina) Julieta Lara Estable (Hungary) Vanda Lukács	(Argentina) Victoria Bosio (Argentina) Nadia Podoroska (Chile) Fernanda Brito (Argentina) Carla Lucero
February 17	Buenos Aires, Argentina; Clay $10,000; Singles and doubles draws	(Russia) Yuliya Kalabina (Russia) Irina Khromacheva; 6–3, 6–2	(Chile) Fernanda Brito (Uruguay) Carolina de los Santos	(Argentina) Julieta Lara Estable (Hungary) Vanda Lukács	(Argentina) Victoria Bosio (Argentina) Nadia Podoroska (Chile) Fernanda Brito (Argentina) Carla Lucero
February 17	Sharm el-Sheikh, Egypt; Hard $10,000; Singles and doubles draws	(Montenegro) Ana Veselinović; 7–5, 5–7, 6–3	(Austria) Barbara Haas	(Netherlands) Demi Schuurs (Czech Republic) Dominika Paterová	(Russia) Eugeniya Pashkova (Poland) Agata Barańska (Madagascar) Zarah Razafimahatratra (Italy) Alessia Piran
February 17	Sharm el-Sheikh, Egypt; Hard $10,000; Singles and doubles draws	(Russia) Eugeniya Pashkova (Montenegro) Ana Veselinović; 6–2, 6–1	(Madagascar) Zarah Razafimahatratra (Netherlands) Demi Schuurs	(Netherlands) Demi Schuurs (Czech Republic) Dominika Paterová	(Russia) Eugeniya Pashkova (Poland) Agata Barańska (Madagascar) Zarah Razafimahatratra (Italy) Alessia Piran
February 17	Mâcon, France; Hard (indoor) $10,000; Singles and doubles draws	(Netherlands) Eva Wacanno; 6–1, 7–6^{(7–4)}	(France) Harmony Tan	(Romania) Ioana Loredana Roșca (France) Margot Yerolymos	(France) Caroline Roméo (France) Lena Pacholski (France) Josepha Adam (France) Alix Collombon
February 17	Mâcon, France; Hard (indoor) $10,000; Singles and doubles draws	(France) Audrey Albié (France) Kinnie Laisné; 6–3, 2–6, [10–8]	(Italy) Camilla Rosatello (Italy) Federica Di Sarra	(Romania) Ioana Loredana Roșca (France) Margot Yerolymos	(France) Caroline Roméo (France) Lena Pacholski (France) Josepha Adam (France) Alix Collombon
February 17	Palma Nova, Spain; Clay $10,000; Singles and doubles draws	(Russia) Ekaterina Lopes; 6–4, 6–2	(Portugal) Bárbara Luz	(Australia) Alexandra Nancarrow (Spain) Olga Sáez Larra	(France) Estelle Cascino (Slovenia) Pia Čuk (Spain) Lucía Cervera Vázquez (Serbia) Natalija Kostić
February 17	Palma Nova, Spain; Clay $10,000; Singles and doubles draws	(Colombia) Yuliana Lizarazo (Australia) Alexandra Nancarrow; 6–3, 6–4	(Netherlands) Anna Katalina Alzate Esmurzaeva (Serbia) Natalija Kostić	(Australia) Alexandra Nancarrow (Spain) Olga Sáez Larra	(France) Estelle Cascino (Slovenia) Pia Čuk (Spain) Lucía Cervera Vázquez (Serbia) Natalija Kostić
February 17	Helsingborg, Sweden; Hard (indoor) $10,000; Singles and doubles draws	(Bosnia and Herzegovina) Jasmina Tinjić; 6–1, 6–0	(Sweden) Rebecca Peterson	(Bosnia and Herzegovina) Dea Herdželaš (Denmark) Karen Barbat	(Sweden) Ellen Allgurin (Netherlands) Lisanne van Riet (Ukraine) Olga Ianchuk (Sweden) Susanne Celik
February 17	Helsingborg, Sweden; Hard (indoor) $10,000; Singles and doubles draws	(Sweden) Cornelia Lister (Netherlands) Lisanne van Riet; 6–4, 6–3	(Ukraine) Olga Ianchuk (Bosnia and Herzegovina) Jasmina Tinjić	(Bosnia and Herzegovina) Dea Herdželaš (Denmark) Karen Barbat	(Sweden) Ellen Allgurin (Netherlands) Lisanne van Riet (Ukraine) Olga Ianchuk (Sweden) Susanne Celik
February 17	Nonthaburi, Thailand; Hard $10,000; Singles and doubles draws	(Hong Kong) Zhang Ling; 6–3, 6–3	(China) Liu Fangzhou	(Japan) Yuuki Tanaka (China) Yang Zi	(Japan) Miyu Kato (Thailand) Nudnida Luangnam (China) Han Xinyun (Japan) Michika Ozeki
February 17	Nonthaburi, Thailand; Hard $10,000; Singles and doubles draws	(China) Han Xinyun (China) Zhang Kailin; 6–3, 6–0	(United Kingdom) Katie Boulter (China) Xun Fangying	(Japan) Yuuki Tanaka (China) Yang Zi	(Japan) Miyu Kato (Thailand) Nudnida Luangnam (China) Han Xinyun (Japan) Michika Ozeki
February 17	Antalya, Turkey; Clay $10,000; Singles and doubles draws	(Slovakia) Lenka Wienerová; 5–7, 6–4, 6–4	(China) Zhu Lin	(Romania) Diana Buzean (Romania) Nicoleta-Cătălina Dascălu	(China) Wang Boyan (Austria) Pia König (China) Yang Zhaoxuan (Georgia (country)) Ekaterine Gorgodze
February 17	Antalya, Turkey; Clay $10,000; Singles and doubles draws	(Austria) Pia König (Georgia (country)) Sofia Kvatsabaia; 2–1, ret.	(China) Li Yihong (China) Yang Zhaoxuan	(Romania) Diana Buzean (Romania) Nicoleta-Cătălina Dascălu	(China) Wang Boyan (Austria) Pia König (China) Yang Zhaoxuan (Georgia (country)) Ekaterine Gorgodze
February 24	Beinasco, Italy; Clay (indoor) $25,000; Singles and doubles draw	(Italy) Anastasia Grymalska; 7–6^{(7–5)}, 6–3	(Ukraine) Anastasiya Vasylyeva	(Italy) Camilla Rosatello (Hungary) Réka-Luca Jani	(Italy) Giulia Sussarello (Italy) Gioia Barbieri (Czech Republic) Tereza Smitková (Czech Republic) Renata Voráčová
February 24	Beinasco, Italy; Clay (indoor) $25,000; Singles and doubles draw	(Italy) Nicole Clerico (Italy) Giulia Gatto-Monticone; 6–1, 5–7, [13–11]	(United Kingdom) Jocelyn Rae (United Kingdom) Anna Smith	(Italy) Camilla Rosatello (Hungary) Réka-Luca Jani	(Italy) Giulia Sussarello (Italy) Gioia Barbieri (Czech Republic) Tereza Smitková (Czech Republic) Renata Voráčová
February 24	Port Pirie, Australia; Hard $15,000; Singles and doubles draws	(Japan) Misa Eguchi; 6–1, 6–2	(Japan) Hiroko Kuwata	(Bulgaria) Aleksandrina Naydenova (Japan) Miki Miyamura	(Slovakia) Zuzana Zlochová (Australia) Ashling Sumner (Japan) Chiaki Okadaue (Australia) Tammi Patterson
February 24	Port Pirie, Australia; Hard $15,000; Singles and doubles draws	(Australia) Jessica Moore (Bulgaria) Aleksandrina Naydenova; 6–4, 6–3	(Japan) Miyabi Inoue (Japan) Hiroko Kuwata	(Bulgaria) Aleksandrina Naydenova (Japan) Miki Miyamura	(Slovakia) Zuzana Zlochová (Australia) Ashling Sumner (Japan) Chiaki Okadaue (Australia) Tammi Patterson
February 24	Buenos Aires, Argentina; Clay $10,000; Singles and doubles draws	(Russia) Irina Khromacheva; 6–2, 7–5	(South Africa) Chanel Simmonds	(Argentina) Aranza Salut (Argentina) Ornella Caron	(Chile) Fernanda Brito (Argentina) Sofía Blanco (Argentina) Guadalupe Moreno (Argentina) Sofía Luini
February 24	Buenos Aires, Argentina; Clay $10,000; Singles and doubles draws	(Russia) Yuliya Kalabina (Russia) Irina Khromacheva; 6–1, 6–1	(Argentina) Ana Victoria Gobbi Monllau (Argentina) Constanza Vega	(Argentina) Aranza Salut (Argentina) Ornella Caron	(Chile) Fernanda Brito (Argentina) Sofía Blanco (Argentina) Guadalupe Moreno (Argentina) Sofía Luini
February 24	Sharm el-Sheikh, Egypt; Hard $10,000; Singles and doubles draws	(Netherlands) Demi Schuurs; 6–4, 6–2	(United Kingdom) Emily Webley-Smith	(Romania) Elena-Teodora Cadar (Czech Republic) Anna Vrbenská	(Ukraine) Diana Bogoliy (Belgium) India Maggen (Madagascar) Zarah Razafimahatratra (Ukraine) Khristina Kazimova
February 24	Sharm el-Sheikh, Egypt; Hard $10,000; Singles and doubles draws	(United Kingdom) Eden Silva (United Kingdom) Emily Webley-Smith; 6–7^{(4–7)}, 6–4, [10–5]	(Czech Republic) Nikola Horáková (Japan) Akari Inoue	(Romania) Elena-Teodora Cadar (Czech Republic) Anna Vrbenská	(Ukraine) Diana Bogoliy (Belgium) India Maggen (Madagascar) Zarah Razafimahatratra (Ukraine) Khristina Kazimova
February 24	Bron, France; Hard (indoor) $10,000; Singles and doubles draws	(Croatia) Ema Mikulčić; 6–0, 7–5	(Bulgaria) Isabella Shinikova	(Republic of Ireland) Amy Bowtell (Serbia) Dunja Stamenković	(China) Lu Jiajing (Switzerland) Lara Michel (Romania) Ioana Loredana Roșca (France) Kinnie Laisné
February 24	Bron, France; Hard (indoor) $10,000; Singles and doubles draws	(Bulgaria) Isabella Shinikova (Ukraine) Alyona Sotnikova; 5–7, 7–6^{(7–5)}, [10–5]	(Germany) Anna Klasen (Philippines) Katharina Lehnert	(Republic of Ireland) Amy Bowtell (Serbia) Dunja Stamenković	(China) Lu Jiajing (Switzerland) Lara Michel (Romania) Ioana Loredana Roșca (France) Kinnie Laisné
February 24	Astana, Kazakhstan; Hard (indoor) $10,000; Singles and doubles draws	(Russia) Olga Doroshina; 6–7^{(5–7)}, 6–4, 7–6^{(8–6)}	(Russia) Veronika Kudermetova	(Russia) Margarita Lazareva (Russia) Natalia Orlova	(Kazakhstan) Kamila Kerimbayeva (Russia) Anastasia Rudakova (Kyrgyzstan) Ksenia Palkina (Russia) Polina Monova
February 24	Astana, Kazakhstan; Hard (indoor) $10,000; Singles and doubles draws	(Uzbekistan) Albina Khabibulina (Kyrgyzstan) Ksenia Palkina; 6–4, 7–5	(Ukraine) Veronika Kapshay (Kazakhstan) Kamila Kerimbayeva	(Russia) Margarita Lazareva (Russia) Natalia Orlova	(Kazakhstan) Kamila Kerimbayeva (Russia) Anastasia Rudakova (Kyrgyzstan) Ksenia Palkina (Russia) Polina Monova
February 24	Palma Nova, Spain; Clay $10,000; Singles and doubles draws	(Spain) Júlia Payola; 7–5, 6–4	(Spain) Inés Ferrer Suárez	(Colombia) Yuliana Lizarazo (Russia) Ekaterina Lopes	(Lithuania) Akvilė Paražinskaitė (Netherlands) Roos van der Zwaan (Japan) Yoshimi Kawasaki (Spain) Olga Parres Azcoitia
February 24	Palma Nova, Spain; Clay $10,000; Singles and doubles draws	(Spain) Inés Ferrer Suárez (Spain) Olga Parres Azcoitia; 6–2, 7–6^{(7–3)}	(Germany) Kim Grajdek (Netherlands) Monique Zuur	(Colombia) Yuliana Lizarazo (Russia) Ekaterina Lopes	(Lithuania) Akvilė Paražinskaitė (Netherlands) Roos van der Zwaan (Japan) Yoshimi Kawasaki (Spain) Olga Parres Azcoitia
February 24	Nonthaburi, Thailand; Hard $10,000; Singles and doubles draws	(China) Xun Fangying; 7–6^{(7–2)}, 6–2	(Japan) Yuuki Tanaka	(Chinese Taipei) Chan Chin-wei (Thailand) Nudnida Luangnam	(China) Liu Fangzhou (South Korea) Kang Seo-kyung (China) Hu Yueyue (South Korea) Kim Dabin
February 24	Nonthaburi, Thailand; Hard $10,000; Singles and doubles draws	(Thailand) Nungnadda Wannasuk (Thailand) Varunya Wongteanchai; 6–2, 6–2	(Japan) Miyu Kato (Japan) Yuuki Tanaka	(Chinese Taipei) Chan Chin-wei (Thailand) Nudnida Luangnam	(China) Liu Fangzhou (South Korea) Kang Seo-kyung (China) Hu Yueyue (South Korea) Kim Dabin
February 24	Antalya, Turkey; Clay $10,000; Singles and doubles draws	(Georgia (country)) Sofia Kvatsabaia; 2–6, 6–0, 6–4	(Georgia (country)) Ekaterine Gorgodze	(Romania) Nicoleta-Cătălina Dascălu (China) Zhu Lin	(Ukraine) Helen Ploskina (Romania) Cristina Adamescu (North Macedonia) Lina Gjorcheska (Slovakia) Lenka Wienerová
February 24	Antalya, Turkey; Clay $10,000; Singles and doubles draws	(China) Li Yihong (China) Zhu Lin; 3–6, 6–3, [10–3]	(Romania) Nicoleta-Cătălina Dascălu (Romania) Raluca Georgiana Șerban	(Romania) Nicoleta-Cătălina Dascălu (China) Zhu Lin	(Ukraine) Helen Ploskina (Romania) Cristina Adamescu (North Macedonia) Lina Gjorcheska (Slovakia) Lenka Wienerová

=== March ===
Week of	Tournament	Winner	Runners-up	Semifinalists	Quarterfinalists
March 3	Blossom Cup; Quanzhou, China; Hard $50,000; Singles – Doubles	(Kazakhstan) Zarina Diyas; 6–1, 6–1	(Thailand) Noppawan Lertcheewakarn	(Russia) Ksenia Pervak (China) Duan Yingying	(China) Wang Qiang (China) Xu Yifan (Japan) Eri Hozumi (Slovenia) Dalila Jakupovič
March 3	Blossom Cup; Quanzhou, China; Hard $50,000; Singles – Doubles	(Chinese Taipei) Chan Chin-wei (China) Xu Yifan; 7–6^{(7–4)}, 6–1	(China) Sun Ziyue (China) Xu Shilin	(Russia) Ksenia Pervak (China) Duan Yingying	(China) Wang Qiang (China) Xu Yifan (Japan) Eri Hozumi (Slovenia) Dalila Jakupovič
March 3	Campinas, Brazil; Clay $25,000; Singles and doubles draws	(Romania) Irina-Camelia Begu; 6–2, 6–4	(Russia) Alexandra Panova	(Romania) Alexandra Dulgheru (Argentina) María Irigoyen	(Paraguay) Verónica Cepede Royg (Brazil) Paula Cristina Gonçalves (Slovakia) Kristína Kučová (Liechtenstein) Stephanie Vogt
March 3	Campinas, Brazil; Clay $25,000; Singles and doubles draws	(Ukraine) Lyudmyla Kichenok (Russia) Alexandra Panova; 6–1, 6–3	(France) Laura Thorpe (Liechtenstein) Stephanie Vogt	(Romania) Alexandra Dulgheru (Argentina) María Irigoyen	(Paraguay) Verónica Cepede Royg (Brazil) Paula Cristina Gonçalves (Slovakia) Kristína Kučová (Liechtenstein) Stephanie Vogt
March 3	Irapuato, Mexico; Hard $25,000; Singles and doubles draws	(Netherlands) Indy de Vroome; 3–6, 6–4, 6–1	(Japan) Naomi Osaka	(Ukraine) Lesia Tsurenko (United States) Chieh-Yu Hsu	(Canada) Heidi El Tabakh (Japan) Sachie Ishizu (Mexico) Ximena Hermoso (Serbia) Jovana Jakšić
March 3	Irapuato, Mexico; Hard $25,000; Singles and doubles draws	(United States) Denise Muresan (Netherlands) Indy de Vroome; 6–4, 5–7, [10–7]	(Russia) Irina Khromacheva (Germany) Anna Zaja	(Ukraine) Lesia Tsurenko (United States) Chieh-Yu Hsu	(Canada) Heidi El Tabakh (Japan) Sachie Ishizu (Mexico) Ximena Hermoso (Serbia) Jovana Jakšić
March 3	Preston, United Kingdom; Hard (indoor) $25,000; Singles and doubles draws	(Czech Republic) Kristýna Plíšková; 6–3, 7–6^{(7–4)}	(Turkey) Çağla Büyükakçay	(Switzerland) Timea Bacsinszky (Germany) Carina Witthöft	(France) Claire Feuerstein (Italy) Alberta Brianti (Netherlands) Lesley Kerkhove (United Kingdom) Naomi Broady
March 3	Preston, United Kingdom; Hard (indoor) $25,000; Singles and doubles draws	(United Kingdom) Tara Moore (Russia) Marta Sirotkina; 3–6, 6–1, [13–11]	(Switzerland) Timea Bacsinszky (Germany) Kristina Barrois	(Switzerland) Timea Bacsinszky (Germany) Carina Witthöft	(France) Claire Feuerstein (Italy) Alberta Brianti (Netherlands) Lesley Kerkhove (United Kingdom) Naomi Broady
March 3	Mildura, Australia; Grass $15,000; Singles and doubles draws	(South Korea) Jang Su-jeong; 6–1, 6–3	(Australia) Alison Bai	(Australia) Jessica Moore (Slovakia) Zuzana Zlochová	(Australia) Viktorija Rajicic (Australia) Karolina Wlodarczak (Australia) Tammi Patterson (Italy) Alice Balducci
March 3	Mildura, Australia; Grass $15,000; Singles and doubles draws	(South Korea) Jang Su-jeong (South Korea) Lee So-ra; 6–1, 1–6, [10–4]	(Australia) Jessica Moore (Bulgaria) Aleksandrina Naydenova	(Australia) Jessica Moore (Slovakia) Zuzana Zlochová	(Australia) Viktorija Rajicic (Australia) Karolina Wlodarczak (Australia) Tammi Patterson (Italy) Alice Balducci
March 3	Sharm el-Sheikh, Egypt; Hard $10,000; Singles and doubles draws	(Finland) Emma Laine; 6–2, 6–2	(South Africa) Madrie Le Roux	(Ukraine) Khristina Kazimova (Switzerland) Conny Perrin	(Serbia) Nina Stojanović (Ukraine) Anastasia Kharchenko (Ukraine) Olga Ianchuk (Egypt) Ola Abou Zekry
March 3	Sharm el-Sheikh, Egypt; Hard $10,000; Singles and doubles draws	(Japan) Akari Inoue (Finland) Emma Laine; 6–2, 6–2	(Ukraine) Diana Bogoliy (Ukraine) Khristina Kazimova	(Ukraine) Khristina Kazimova (Switzerland) Conny Perrin	(Serbia) Nina Stojanović (Ukraine) Anastasia Kharchenko (Ukraine) Olga Ianchuk (Egypt) Ola Abou Zekry
March 3	Amiens, France; Clay (indoor) $10,000; Singles and doubles draws	(Italy) Alice Matteucci; 6–4, 6–3	(France) Manon Arcangioli	(Bulgaria) Isabella Shinikova (France) Alice Ramé	(Ukraine) Alyona Sotnikova (Germany) Justine Ozga (Italy) Deborah Chiesa (France) Jade Suvrijn
March 3	Amiens, France; Clay (indoor) $10,000; Singles and doubles draws	(Bulgaria) Isabella Shinikova (Ukraine) Alyona Sotnikova; 6–1, 6–4	(Italy) Angelica Moratelli (Italy) Anna Remondina	(Bulgaria) Isabella Shinikova (France) Alice Ramé	(Ukraine) Alyona Sotnikova (Germany) Justine Ozga (Italy) Deborah Chiesa (France) Jade Suvrijn
March 3	Astana, Kazakhstan; Hard (indoor) $10,000; Singles and doubles draws	(Russia) Veronika Kudermetova; 7–6^{(7–2)}, 7–6^{(7–3)}	(Russia) Olga Doroshina	(Russia) Ekaterina Yashina (Russia) Natalia Orlova	(Ukraine) Veronika Kapshay (Russia) Anastasia Rudakova (Russia) Margarita Lazareva (Russia) Yana Mogilnitskaya
March 3	Astana, Kazakhstan; Hard (indoor) $10,000; Singles and doubles draws	(Kazakhstan) Anna Danilina (Russia) Olga Doroshina; 6–3, 7–6^{(7–4)}	(Kazakhstan) Alexandra Grinchishina (Ukraine) Kateryna Sliusar	(Russia) Ekaterina Yashina (Russia) Natalia Orlova	(Ukraine) Veronika Kapshay (Russia) Anastasia Rudakova (Russia) Margarita Lazareva (Russia) Yana Mogilnitskaya
March 3	Antalya, Turkey; Clay $10,000; Singles and doubles draws	(China) Zhu Lin; 6–1, 6–4	(Belarus) Iryna Shymanovich	(Slovakia) Viktória Kužmová (Japan) Mana Ayukawa	(North Macedonia) Lina Gjorcheska (Georgia (country)) Sofia Kvatsabaia (Slovakia) Kristína Schmiedlová (Italy) Martina Caregaro
March 3	Antalya, Turkey; Clay $10,000; Singles and doubles draws	(France) Estelle Cascino (Czech Republic) Martina Kubičíková; 6–7^{(2–7)}, 6–2, [10–7]	(Italy) Martina Caregaro (Italy) Anna Floris	(Slovakia) Viktória Kužmová (Japan) Mana Ayukawa	(North Macedonia) Lina Gjorcheska (Georgia (country)) Sofia Kvatsabaia (Slovakia) Kristína Schmiedlová (Italy) Martina Caregaro
March 3	Gainesville, United States; Clay $10,000; Singles and doubles draws	(Czech Republic) Kateřina Kramperová; 6–3, 6–2	(United States) Katerina Stewart	(Czech Republic) Marie Bouzková (Mexico) Renata Zarazúa	(Germany) Sina Haas (United States) Anne-Liz Jeukeng (Mexico) Alejandra Cisneros (United States) Andie Daniell
March 3	Gainesville, United States; Clay $10,000; Singles and doubles draws	(Czech Republic) Nikola Fraňková (Czech Republic) Kateřina Kramperová; 6–4, 6–3	(United States) Roxanne Ellison (United States) Sierra Ellison	(Czech Republic) Marie Bouzková (Mexico) Renata Zarazúa	(Germany) Sina Haas (United States) Anne-Liz Jeukeng (Mexico) Alejandra Cisneros (United States) Andie Daniell
March 10	São Paulo, Brazil; Clay $25,000; Singles and doubles draws	(Romania) Irina-Camelia Begu; 7–5, 4–6, 6–4	(Russia) Alexandra Panova	(Russia) Marina Melnikova (Argentina) María Irigoyen	(Argentina) Florencia Molinero (South Africa) Chanel Simmonds (Slovakia) Kristína Kučová (France) Fiona Ferro
March 10	São Paulo, Brazil; Clay $25,000; Singles and doubles draws	(Romania) Irina-Camelia Begu (Russia) Alexandra Panova; 6–4, 3–6, [11–9]	(Bolivia) María Fernanda Álvarez Terán (Argentina) María Irigoyen	(Russia) Marina Melnikova (Argentina) María Irigoyen	(Argentina) Florencia Molinero (South Africa) Chanel Simmonds (Slovakia) Kristína Kučová (France) Fiona Ferro
March 10	Shenzhen, China; Hard $10,000; Singles and doubles draws	(China) Zhang Kailin; 6–0, 5–7, 6–1	(China) Tian Ran	(Russia) Polina Leykina (China) Liu Chang	(China) Tang Haochen (Thailand) Varatchaya Wongteanchai (China) Wang Yan (China) Dong Xiaorong
March 10	Shenzhen, China; Hard $10,000; Singles and doubles draws	(South Korea) Han Na-lae (South Korea) Yoo Mi; 6–1, 6–1	(Russia) Natela Dzalamidze (Russia) Polina Leykina	(Russia) Polina Leykina (China) Liu Chang	(China) Tang Haochen (Thailand) Varatchaya Wongteanchai (China) Wang Yan (China) Dong Xiaorong
March 10	Sharm el-Sheikh, Egypt; Hard $10,000; Singles and doubles draws	(Russia) Vitalia Diatchenko; 3–6, 6–4, 6–1	(United Kingdom) Naomi Broady	(Russia) Marina Shamayko (Bosnia and Herzegovina) Dea Herdželaš	(South Africa) Madrie Le Roux (United Kingdom) Eden Silva (Montenegro) Ana Veselinović (Serbia) Nina Stojanović
March 10	Sharm el-Sheikh, Egypt; Hard $10,000; Singles and doubles draws	(Serbia) Nina Stojanović (Montenegro) Ana Veselinović; 6–0, 4–6, [10–6]	(Bosnia and Herzegovina) Dea Herdželaš (India) Natasha Palha	(Russia) Marina Shamayko (Bosnia and Herzegovina) Dea Herdželaš	(South Africa) Madrie Le Roux (United Kingdom) Eden Silva (Montenegro) Ana Veselinović (Serbia) Nina Stojanović
March 10	Gonesse, France; Clay (indoor) $10,000; Singles and doubles draws	(Italy) Anna Remondina; 7–5, 7–6^{(8–6)}	(Germany) Anne Schäfer	(Slovakia) Karin Morgošová (France) Sherazad Benamar	(Ukraine) Alyona Sotnikova (United Kingdom) Manisha Foster (France) Audrey Albié (Croatia) Iva Mekovec
March 10	Gonesse, France; Clay (indoor) $10,000; Singles and doubles draws	(France) Jessika Ponchet (Czech Republic) Karolína Stuchlá; 6–7^{(4–7)}, 6–3, [10–3]	(Germany) Carolin Daniels (Germany) Lena-Marie Hofmann	(Slovakia) Karin Morgošová (France) Sherazad Benamar	(Ukraine) Alyona Sotnikova (United Kingdom) Manisha Foster (France) Audrey Albié (Croatia) Iva Mekovec
March 10	Heraklion, Greece; Hard $10,000; Singles and doubles draws	(Israel) Deniz Khazaniuk; 7–6^{(7–4)}, 6–3	(France) Alix Collombon	(Czech Republic) Tereza Martincová (Switzerland) Xenia Knoll	(Belgium) Marie Benoît (Germany) Nina Zander (Germany) Julia Wachaczyk (Poland) Magdalena Fręch
March 10	Heraklion, Greece; Hard $10,000; Singles and doubles draws	(Lithuania) Akvilė Paražinskaitė (Russia) Alina Silich; 6–2, 6–0	(Czech Republic) Denisa Kulhánková (Czech Republic) Petra Melounová	(Czech Republic) Tereza Martincová (Switzerland) Xenia Knoll	(Belgium) Marie Benoît (Germany) Nina Zander (Germany) Julia Wachaczyk (Poland) Magdalena Fręch
March 10	Santa Margherita di Pula, Italy; Clay $10,000; Singles and doubles draws	(Switzerland) Karin Kennel; 6–2, 6–1	(Italy) Tatiana Pieri	(Italy) Claudia Giovine (Colombia) Yuliana Lizarazo	(Slovenia) Maša Zec Peškirič (India) Sowjanya Bavisetti (Spain) Inés Ferrer Suárez (Italy) Beatrice Lombardo
March 10	Santa Margherita di Pula, Italy; Clay $10,000; Singles and doubles draws	(Italy) Martina Caregaro (Italy) Anna Floris; 6–3, 5–7, [10–8]	(Germany) Kim Grajdek (Slovenia) Maša Zec Peškirič	(Italy) Claudia Giovine (Colombia) Yuliana Lizarazo	(Slovenia) Maša Zec Peškirič (India) Sowjanya Bavisetti (Spain) Inés Ferrer Suárez (Italy) Beatrice Lombardo
March 10	Astana, Kazakhstan; Hard (indoor) $10,000; Singles and doubles draws	(Russia) Natalia Orlova; 4–6, 7–5, 6–1	(Kazakhstan) Kamila Kerimbayeva	(Russia) Ekaterina Yashina (Uzbekistan) Albina Khabibulina	(Russia) Anastasiya Komardina (Kazakhstan) Alexandra Grinchishina (Russia) Margarita Lazareva (Ukraine) Kateryna Sliusar
March 10	Astana, Kazakhstan; Hard (indoor) $10,000; Singles and doubles draws	(Kazakhstan) Alexandra Grinchishina (Ukraine) Kateryna Sliusar; 6–4, 7–6^{(7–3)}	(Kazakhstan) Ekaterina Klyueva (Russia) Sofia Smagina	(Russia) Ekaterina Yashina (Uzbekistan) Albina Khabibulina	(Russia) Anastasiya Komardina (Kazakhstan) Alexandra Grinchishina (Russia) Margarita Lazareva (Ukraine) Kateryna Sliusar
March 10	Ponta Delgada, Portugal; Hard $10,000; Singles and doubles draws	(Russia) Ekaterina Lopes; 6–4, 6–2	(Portugal) Bárbara Luz	(Netherlands) Quirine Lemoine (Czech Republic) Pernilla Mendesová	(Belgium) Elise Mertens (France) Joséphine Boualem (Argentina) Tatiana Búa (France) Kinnie Laisné
March 10	Ponta Delgada, Portugal; Hard $10,000; Singles and doubles draws	(Argentina) Tatiana Búa (Spain) Olga Parres Azcoitia; 6–3, 6–4	(Czech Republic) Tereza Malíková (Czech Republic) Pernilla Mendesová	(Netherlands) Quirine Lemoine (Czech Republic) Pernilla Mendesová	(Belgium) Elise Mertens (France) Joséphine Boualem (Argentina) Tatiana Búa (France) Kinnie Laisné
March 10	Antalya, Turkey; Clay $10,000; Singles and doubles draws	(Belarus) Iryna Shymanovich; 6–2, 6–3	(Germany) Lisa Ponomar	(North Macedonia) Lina Gjorcheska (Czech Republic) Martina Kubičíková	(Austria) Barbara Haas (Serbia) Milana Špremo (Slovakia) Lenka Juríková (Japan) Yoshimi Kawasaki
March 10	Antalya, Turkey; Clay $10,000; Singles and doubles draws	(Japan) Mana Ayukawa (France) Estelle Cascino; 7–5, 7–5	(Slovakia) Lenka Juríková (Austria) Janina Toljan	(North Macedonia) Lina Gjorcheska (Czech Republic) Martina Kubičíková	(Austria) Barbara Haas (Serbia) Milana Špremo (Slovakia) Lenka Juríková (Japan) Yoshimi Kawasaki
March 10	Orlando, United States; Clay $10,000; Singles and doubles draws	(United States) Katerina Stewart; 6–1, 6–1	(Ukraine) Elizaveta Ianchuk	(Belarus) Aliaksandra Sasnovich (United States) Natalie Suk	(United States) CiCi Bellis (Russia) Evgeniya Rodina (Japan) Mayo Hibi (Spain) Aliona Bolsova Zadoinov
March 10	Orlando, United States; Clay $10,000; Singles and doubles draws	(United States) CiCi Bellis (United States) Alexis Nelson; 6–2, 0–6, [11–9]	(Australia) Sally Peers (United States) Natalie Pluskota	(Belarus) Aliaksandra Sasnovich (United States) Natalie Suk	(United States) CiCi Bellis (Russia) Evgeniya Rodina (Japan) Mayo Hibi (Spain) Aliona Bolsova Zadoinov
March 17	Innisbrook, United States; Clay $25,000; Singles and doubles draws	(United States) Grace Min; 7–5, 6–0	(United States) Nicole Gibbs	(Italy) Gioia Barbieri (United States) Louisa Chirico	(United States) Madison Brengle (United States) Katerina Stewart (Hong Kong) Zhang Ling (Kazakhstan) Yulia Putintseva
March 17	Innisbrook, United States; Clay $25,000; Singles and doubles draws	(Italy) Gioia Barbieri (United States) Julia Cohen; 7–6^{(7–5)}, 6–0	(United States) Allie Kiick (United States) Sachia Vickery	(Italy) Gioia Barbieri (United States) Louisa Chirico	(United States) Madison Brengle (United States) Katerina Stewart (Hong Kong) Zhang Ling (Kazakhstan) Yulia Putintseva
March 17	Santiago, Chile; Clay $10,000; Singles and doubles draws	(Brazil) Gabriela Cé; 6–3, 7–5	(Chile) Fernanda Brito	(Argentina) Nadia Podoroska (Argentina) Victoria Bosio	(Chile) Camila Silva (Argentina) Sofía Blanco (Chile) Macarena Olivares López (Russia) Vera Aleshcheva
March 17	Santiago, Chile; Clay $10,000; Singles and doubles draws	(Chile) Fernanda Brito (Chile) Camila Silva; 1–6, 7–6^{(7–5)}, [10–7]	(Argentina) Sofía Blanco (Argentina) Nadia Podoroska	(Argentina) Nadia Podoroska (Argentina) Victoria Bosio	(Chile) Camila Silva (Argentina) Sofía Blanco (Chile) Macarena Olivares López (Russia) Vera Aleshcheva
March 17	Shenzhen, China; Hard $10,000; Singles and doubles draws	(China) Tang Haochen; 6–3, 6–2	(China) Zhang Kailin	(China) Zhu Lin (Chinese Taipei) Chan Chin-wei	(China) Hu Yueyue (China) Yang Zi (South Korea) Yoo Mi (Uzbekistan) Sabina Sharipova
March 17	Shenzhen, China; Hard $10,000; Singles and doubles draws	(China) Han Xinyun (China) Zhang Kailin; 6–3, 2–6, [13–11]	(Chinese Taipei) Chan Chin-wei (China) Liu Chang	(China) Zhu Lin (Chinese Taipei) Chan Chin-wei	(China) Hu Yueyue (China) Yang Zi (South Korea) Yoo Mi (Uzbekistan) Sabina Sharipova
March 17	Sharm el-Sheikh, Egypt; Hard $10,000; Singles and doubles draws	(United Kingdom) Naomi Broady; 6–2, 3–0, ret.	(Russia) Vitalia Diatchenko	(Italy) Alice Savoretti (Montenegro) Ana Veselinović	(South Africa) Madrie Le Roux (India) Prarthana Thombare (Slovakia) Zuzana Luknárová (United Kingdom) Emily Webley-Smith
March 17	Sharm el-Sheikh, Egypt; Hard $10,000; Singles and doubles draws	(Russia) Eugeniya Pashkova (Montenegro) Ana Veselinović; 6–3, 7–5	(Finland) Emma Laine (United Kingdom) Emily Webley-Smith	(Italy) Alice Savoretti (Montenegro) Ana Veselinović	(South Africa) Madrie Le Roux (India) Prarthana Thombare (Slovakia) Zuzana Luknárová (United Kingdom) Emily Webley-Smith
March 17	Le Havre, France; Clay (indoor) $10,000; Singles and doubles draws	(Spain) Yvonne Cavallé Reimers; 2–6, 6–4, 6–3	(Italy) Martina Colmegna	(Hungary) Vanda Lukács (France) Manon Arcangioli	(Bulgaria) Isabella Shinikova (Ukraine) Alyona Sotnikova (France) Carla Touly (France) Jade Suvrijn
March 17	Le Havre, France; Clay (indoor) $10,000; Singles and doubles draws	(Bulgaria) Isabella Shinikova (Ukraine) Alyona Sotnikova; 6–4, 6–3	(Netherlands) Bernice van de Velde (Netherlands) Kelly Versteeg	(Hungary) Vanda Lukács (France) Manon Arcangioli	(Bulgaria) Isabella Shinikova (Ukraine) Alyona Sotnikova (France) Carla Touly (France) Jade Suvrijn
March 17	Heraklion, Greece; Hard $10,000; Singles and doubles draws	(United Kingdom) Anna Smith; 6–1, 6–3	(Switzerland) Xenia Knoll	(Germany) Nina Zander (Sweden) Jacqueline Cabaj Awad	(Lithuania) Akvilė Paražinskaitė (Germany) Luisa Marie Huber (Republic of Ireland) Amy Bowtell (Belgium) Marie Benoît
March 17	Heraklion, Greece; Hard $10,000; Singles and doubles draws	(Liechtenstein) Kathinka von Deichmann (Slovakia) Petra Uberalová; 7–5, 6–2	(Poland) Agata Barańska (Bulgaria) Vivian Zlatanova	(Germany) Nina Zander (Sweden) Jacqueline Cabaj Awad	(Lithuania) Akvilė Paražinskaitė (Germany) Luisa Marie Huber (Republic of Ireland) Amy Bowtell (Belgium) Marie Benoît
March 17	Santa Margherita di Pula, Italy; Clay $10,000; Singles and doubles draws	(Slovenia) Maša Zec Peškirič; 6–4, 6–4	(Ukraine) Sofiya Kovalets	(Italy) Martina Caregaro (Switzerland) Karin Kennel	(Spain) Inés Ferrer Suárez (India) Sowjanya Bavisetti (Czech Republic) Barbora Štefková (France) Estelle Cascino
March 17	Santa Margherita di Pula, Italy; Clay $10,000; Singles and doubles draws	(Colombia) Yuliana Lizarazo (Australia) Alexandra Nancarrow; 6–3, 4–6, [11–9]	(Italy) Alice Matteucci (Greece) Despina Papamichail	(Italy) Martina Caregaro (Switzerland) Karin Kennel	(Spain) Inés Ferrer Suárez (India) Sowjanya Bavisetti (Czech Republic) Barbora Štefková (France) Estelle Cascino
March 17	Kōfu, Japan; Hard $10,000; Singles and doubles draws	(Japan) Chiaki Okadaue; 3–6, 7–6^{(9–7)}, 6–2	(Japan) Mana Ayukawa	(South Korea) Choi Ji-hee (South Korea) Kang Seo-kyung	(Japan) Yurina Koshino (Japan) Akari Inoue (Japan) Machika Miyaji (Japan) Mai Minokoshi
March 17	Kōfu, Japan; Hard $10,000; Singles and doubles draws	(Japan) Nagi Hanatani (Japan) Hikari Yamamoto; 3–6, 6–2, [10–7]	(Japan) Riko Fujioka (Japan) Hayaka Murase	(South Korea) Choi Ji-hee (South Korea) Kang Seo-kyung	(Japan) Yurina Koshino (Japan) Akari Inoue (Japan) Machika Miyaji (Japan) Mai Minokoshi
March 17	Lima, Peru; Clay $10,000; Singles and doubles draws	(Hungary) Csilla Argyelán; 4–6, 6–4, 6–3	(Argentina) Carolina Zeballos	(Canada) Wendy Zhang (Argentina) Berta Bonardi	(Venezuela) Aymet Uzcátegui (Argentina) María Agustina de Carli (Russia) Anastasia Nefedova (Argentina) Stephanie Mariel Petit
March 17	Lima, Peru; Clay $10,000; Singles and doubles draws	(Serbia) Tamara Čurović (Russia) Yana Sizikova; 6–4, 7–5	(Argentina) Sofía Luini (Argentina) Aranza Salut	(Canada) Wendy Zhang (Argentina) Berta Bonardi	(Venezuela) Aymet Uzcátegui (Argentina) María Agustina de Carli (Russia) Anastasia Nefedova (Argentina) Stephanie Mariel Petit
March 17	Ponta Delgada, Portugal; Hard $10,000; Singles and doubles draws	(Belgium) Elise Mertens; 6–2, 6–4	(Portugal) Bárbara Luz	(Argentina) Tatiana Búa (Czech Republic) Tereza Malíková	(Czech Republic) Kateřina Vaňková (Russia) Ekaterina Lopes (France) Kinnie Laisné (Ukraine) Valeriya Strakhova
March 17	Ponta Delgada, Portugal; Hard $10,000; Singles and doubles draws	(Belgium) Elise Mertens (Belarus) Sviatlana Pirazhenka; 6–1, 6–2	(Czech Republic) Tereza Malíková (Czech Republic) Pernilla Mendesová	(Argentina) Tatiana Búa (Czech Republic) Tereza Malíková	(Czech Republic) Kateřina Vaňková (Russia) Ekaterina Lopes (France) Kinnie Laisné (Ukraine) Valeriya Strakhova
March 17	Antalya, Turkey; Hard $10,000; Singles and doubles draws	(Czech Republic) Denisa Allertová; 6–3, 6–2	(Czech Republic) Barbora Krejčíková	(Germany) Lisa Ponomar (Kyrgyzstan) Ksenia Palkina	(Slovakia) Chantal Škamlová (Romania) Irina Maria Bara (Russia) Aleksandra Zenovka (Sweden) Susanne Celik
March 17	Antalya, Turkey; Hard $10,000; Singles and doubles draws	(Georgia (country)) Ekaterine Gorgodze (Georgia (country)) Sofia Kvatsabaia; 4–6, 6–1, [10–8]	(Serbia) Natalija Kostić (Slovakia) Chantal Škamlová	(Germany) Lisa Ponomar (Kyrgyzstan) Ksenia Palkina	(Slovakia) Chantal Škamlová (Romania) Irina Maria Bara (Russia) Aleksandra Zenovka (Sweden) Susanne Celik
March 24	Open GDF Suez Seine-et-Marne; Croissy-Beaubourg, France; Hard (indoor) $50,000; Singles – Doubles	(France) Claire Feuerstein; 6–3, 4–6, 6–4	(Czech Republic) Renata Voráčová	(Czech Republic) Tereza Smitková (Czech Republic) Kateřina Siniaková	(Ukraine) Lyudmyla Kichenok (Italy) Alberta Brianti (Tunisia) Ons Jabeur (France) Myrtille Georges
March 24	Open GDF Suez Seine-et-Marne; Croissy-Beaubourg, France; Hard (indoor) $50,000; Singles – Doubles	(Russia) Margarita Gasparyan (Ukraine) Lyudmyla Kichenok; 6–2, 6–4	(Germany) Kristina Barrois (Greece) Eleni Daniilidou	(Czech Republic) Tereza Smitková (Czech Republic) Kateřina Siniaková	(Ukraine) Lyudmyla Kichenok (Italy) Alberta Brianti (Tunisia) Ons Jabeur (France) Myrtille Georges
March 24	The Oaks Club Challenger; Osprey, United States; Clay $50,000; Singles – Doubles	(Slovakia) Anna Karolína Schmiedlová; 6–2, 6–3	(New Zealand) Marina Erakovic	(Slovakia) Jana Čepelová (Spain) Lourdes Domínguez Lino	(Netherlands) Kiki Bertens (Belarus) Ilona Kremen (Switzerland) Romina Oprandi (Sweden) Johanna Larsson
March 24	The Oaks Club Challenger; Osprey, United States; Clay $50,000; Singles – Doubles	(Japan) Rika Fujiwara (Chinese Taipei) Hsieh Shu-ying; 6–3, 6–7^{(5–7)}, [10–4]	(United States) Irina Falconi (Czech Republic) Eva Hrdinová	(Slovakia) Jana Čepelová (Spain) Lourdes Domínguez Lino	(Netherlands) Kiki Bertens (Belarus) Ilona Kremen (Switzerland) Romina Oprandi (Sweden) Johanna Larsson
March 24	Ribeirão Preto, Brazil; Clay $10,000; Singles and doubles draws	(Argentina) Victoria Bosio; 6–0, 7–5	(Brazil) Gabriela Cé	(Brazil) Ana Clara Duarte (Brazil) Nathália Rossi	(France) Brandy Mina (Brazil) Isabella Capato Comargo (Brazil) Ingrid Gamarra Martins (Brazil) Maria Fernanda Alves
March 24	Ribeirão Preto, Brazil; Clay $10,000; Singles and doubles draws	(Brazil) Maria Fernanda Alves (Brazil) Ana Clara Duarte; 6–4, 4–6, [11–9]	(Brazil) Gabriela Cé (Brazil) Eduarda Piai	(Brazil) Ana Clara Duarte (Brazil) Nathália Rossi	(France) Brandy Mina (Brazil) Isabella Capato Comargo (Brazil) Ingrid Gamarra Martins (Brazil) Maria Fernanda Alves
March 24	Shenzhen, China; Hard $10,000; Singles and doubles draws	(Chinese Taipei) Chan Chin-wei; 2–6, 6–3, 6–3	(China) Liu Fangzhou	(China) Liu Chang (China) Lu Jiajing	(China) Hu Yueyue (China) Gai Ao (Chinese Taipei) Lee Hua-chen (China) Xun Fangying
March 24	Shenzhen, China; Hard $10,000; Singles and doubles draws	(China) Han Xinyun (China) Zhang Kailin; 6–0, 6–3	(China) Gai Ao (China) Wang Yan	(China) Liu Chang (China) Lu Jiajing	(China) Hu Yueyue (China) Gai Ao (Chinese Taipei) Lee Hua-chen (China) Xun Fangying
March 24	Sharm el-Sheikh, Egypt; Hard $10,000; Singles and doubles draws	(United Kingdom) Emily Webley-Smith; 7–6^{(9–7)}, 0–6, 6–4	(Russia) Eugeniya Pashkova	(Belgium) Britt Geukens (Slovakia) Zuzana Luknárová	(Bulgaria) Ani Vangelova (Serbia) Teodora Radosavljević (South Africa) Madrie Le Roux (Slovakia) Vivien Juhászová
March 24	Sharm el-Sheikh, Egypt; Hard $10,000; Singles and doubles draws	(Russia) Eugeniya Pashkova (India) Prarthana Thombare; 6–2, 6–4	(United Kingdom) Laura Deigman (United Kingdom) Emily Webley-Smith	(Belgium) Britt Geukens (Slovakia) Zuzana Luknárová	(Bulgaria) Ani Vangelova (Serbia) Teodora Radosavljević (South Africa) Madrie Le Roux (Slovakia) Vivien Juhászová
March 24	Heraklion, Greece; Hard $10,000; Singles and doubles draws	(Germany) Anna Zaja; 6–4, 6–1	(Liechtenstein) Kathinka von Deichmann	(Russia) Anastasiya Saitova (Portugal) Bárbara Luz	(United Kingdom) Samantha Murray (Poland) Justyna Jegiołka (Austria) Lisa-Maria Moser (Switzerland) Xenia Knoll
March 24	Heraklion, Greece; Hard $10,000; Singles and doubles draws	(Netherlands) Lisanne van Riet (Netherlands) Monique Zuur; 6–4, 7–5	(Serbia) Marina Lazić (Serbia) Bojana Marinković	(Russia) Anastasiya Saitova (Portugal) Bárbara Luz	(United Kingdom) Samantha Murray (Poland) Justyna Jegiołka (Austria) Lisa-Maria Moser (Switzerland) Xenia Knoll
March 24	Santa Margherita di Pula, Italy; Clay $10,000; Singles and doubles draws	(Italy) Alice Balducci; 6–3, 5–7, 6–3	(France) Estelle Cascino	(Greece) Despina Papamichail (Spain) Olga Sáez Larra	(Ukraine) Sofiya Kovalets (Austria) Yvonne Neuwirth (France) Angela Leweurs (Czech Republic) Barbora Štefková
March 24	Santa Margherita di Pula, Italy; Clay $10,000; Singles and doubles draws	(Australia) Alexandra Nancarrow (Spain) Olga Sáez Larra; 6–3, 4–6, [10–8]	(Netherlands) Rosalie van der Hoek (Greece) Despina Papamichail	(Greece) Despina Papamichail (Spain) Olga Sáez Larra	(Ukraine) Sofiya Kovalets (Austria) Yvonne Neuwirth (France) Angela Leweurs (Czech Republic) Barbora Štefková
March 24	Nishitama, Japan; Hard $10,000; Singles and doubles draws	(Japan) Miyabi Inoue; 1–6, 7–5, 6–1	(Thailand) Nudnida Luangnam	(Japan) Yuuki Tanaka (Japan) Riko Sawayanagi	(Japan) Makoto Ninomiya (Thailand) Nungnadda Wannasuk (Japan) Chiaki Okadaue (Japan) Shiho Akita
March 24	Nishitama, Japan; Hard $10,000; Singles and doubles draws	(Japan) Junri Namigata (Japan) Akiko Yonemura; 6–2, 6–4	(South Korea) Choi Ji-hee (Japan) Akari Inoue	(Japan) Yuuki Tanaka (Japan) Riko Sawayanagi	(Japan) Makoto Ninomiya (Thailand) Nungnadda Wannasuk (Japan) Chiaki Okadaue (Japan) Shiho Akita
March 24	Lima, Peru; Clay $10,000; Singles and doubles draws	(Argentina) Nadia Podoroska; 6–3, 6–4	(Argentina) Carla Lucero	(Russia) Yana Sizikova (Russia) Anastasia Pivovarova	(Argentina) Sofía Luini (Canada) Wendy Zhang (Serbia) Tamara Čurović (Argentina) Carolina Zeballos
March 24	Lima, Peru; Clay $10,000; Singles and doubles draws	(Serbia) Tamara Čurović (Russia) Yana Sizikova; 6–2, 7–6^{(7–2)}	(Argentina) Sofía Luini (Argentina) Aranza Salut	(Russia) Yana Sizikova (Russia) Anastasia Pivovarova	(Argentina) Sofía Luini (Canada) Wendy Zhang (Serbia) Tamara Čurović (Argentina) Carolina Zeballos
March 24	Antalya, Turkey; Hard $10,000; Singles and doubles draws	(Czech Republic) Denisa Allertová; 6–4, 6–3	(Netherlands) Bibiane Schoofs	(Czech Republic) Barbora Krejčíková (Turkey) Başak Eraydın	(Hungary) Ágnes Bukta (Turkey) Melis Sezer (Russia) Mayya Katsitadze (Slovakia) Lenka Juríková
March 24	Antalya, Turkey; Hard $10,000; Singles and doubles draws	(Sweden) Susanne Celik (Japan) Kotomi Takahata; 6–4, 6–3	(Czech Republic) Barbora Krejčíková (Turkey) İpek Soylu	(Czech Republic) Barbora Krejčíková (Turkey) Başak Eraydın	(Hungary) Ágnes Bukta (Turkey) Melis Sezer (Russia) Mayya Katsitadze (Slovakia) Lenka Juríková
March 31	Seguros Bolívar Open Medellín; Medellín, Colombia; Clay $50,000+H; Singles – Doubles	(Paraguay) Verónica Cepede Royg; 6–4, 4–6, 6–4	(Romania) Irina-Camelia Begu	(Russia) Varvara Flink (Argentina) María Irigoyen	(Italy) Gaia Sanesi (Spain) Lara Arruabarrena (Argentina) Florencia Molinero (Switzerland) Romina Oprandi
March 31	Seguros Bolívar Open Medellín; Medellín, Colombia; Clay $50,000+H; Singles – Doubles	(Romania) Irina-Camelia Begu (Argentina) María Irigoyen; 6–2, 7–6^{(7–2)}	(Australia) Monique Adamczak (Russia) Marina Shamayko	(Russia) Varvara Flink (Argentina) María Irigoyen	(Italy) Gaia Sanesi (Spain) Lara Arruabarrena (Argentina) Florencia Molinero (Switzerland) Romina Oprandi
March 31	Edgbaston, United Kingdom; Hard (indoor) $25,000; Singles and doubles draws	(Turkey) Çağla Büyükakçay; 6–4, 2–6, 6–2	(France) Pauline Parmentier	(United Kingdom) Samantha Murray (Tunisia) Ons Jabeur	(United Kingdom) Naomi Broady (Latvia) Diāna Marcinkēviča (Italy) Giulia Gatto-Monticone (Italy) Maria Elena Camerin
March 31	Edgbaston, United Kingdom; Hard (indoor) $25,000; Singles and doubles draws	(United Kingdom) Jocelyn Rae (United Kingdom) Anna Smith; 3–6, 7–5, [10–4]	(Poland) Magda Linette (Switzerland) Amra Sadiković	(United Kingdom) Samantha Murray (Tunisia) Ons Jabeur	(United Kingdom) Naomi Broady (Latvia) Diāna Marcinkēviča (Italy) Giulia Gatto-Monticone (Italy) Maria Elena Camerin
March 31	Jackson, United States; Clay $25,000; Singles and doubles draws	(Norway) Ulrikke Eikeri; 6–2, 6–4	(Ukraine) Anhelina Kalinina	(Slovenia) Nastja Kolar (Belarus) Ilona Kremen	(United States) Chiara Scholl (Russia) Polina Vinogradova (Japan) Mayo Hibi (Slovenia) Maša Zec Peškirič
March 31	Jackson, United States; Clay $25,000; Singles and doubles draws	(South Africa) Chanel Simmonds (Slovenia) Maša Zec Peškirič; 6–7^{(5–7)}, 6–3, [10–5]	(Japan) Erika Sema (Japan) Yurika Sema	(Slovenia) Nastja Kolar (Belarus) Ilona Kremen	(United States) Chiara Scholl (Russia) Polina Vinogradova (Japan) Mayo Hibi (Slovenia) Maša Zec Peškirič
March 31	Mount Waverley, Australia; Clay $15,000; Singles and doubles draws	(China) Han Xinyun; 6–2, 6–3	(United States) Tori Kinard	(Australia) Tammi Patterson (Japan) Miyu Kato	(Australia) Arina Rodionova (Japan) Michika Ozeki (Australia) Jessica Moore (Japan) Mai Minokoshi
March 31	Mount Waverley, Australia; Clay $15,000; Singles and doubles draws	(Australia) Jessica Moore (Bulgaria) Aleksandrina Naydenova; 6–4, 6–2	(Australia) Tammi Patterson (Australia) Ellen Perez	(Australia) Tammi Patterson (Japan) Miyu Kato	(Australia) Arina Rodionova (Japan) Michika Ozeki (Australia) Jessica Moore (Japan) Mai Minokoshi
March 31	Dijon, France; Hard (indoor) $15,000; Singles and doubles draws	(Netherlands) Michaëlla Krajicek; 3–6, 7–5, 6–2	(Russia) Olga Doroshina	(Russia) Ekaterina Yashina (Japan) Miharu Imanishi	(Belarus) Lidziya Marozava (Ukraine) Marianna Zakarlyuk (Czech Republic) Martina Borecká (Germany) Nina Zander
March 31	Dijon, France; Hard (indoor) $15,000; Singles and doubles draws	(Hungary) Réka-Luca Jani (Bulgaria) Isabella Shinikova; 6–3, 7–5	(Czech Republic) Martina Borecká (Netherlands) Michaëlla Krajicek	(Russia) Ekaterina Yashina (Japan) Miharu Imanishi	(Belarus) Lidziya Marozava (Ukraine) Marianna Zakarlyuk (Czech Republic) Martina Borecká (Germany) Nina Zander
March 31	Manama, Bahrain; Hard $10,000; Singles and doubles draws	(Netherlands) Quirine Lemoine; 4–6, 6–1, 6–2	(Oman) Fatma Al-Nabhani	(Italy) Valeria Prosperi (Philippines) Katharina Lehnert	(China) Wang Xiyao (Germany) Michaela Frlicka (India) Prerna Bhambri (France) Harmony Tan
March 31	Manama, Bahrain; Hard $10,000; Singles and doubles draws	(Germany) Michaela Frlicka (Philippines) Katharina Lehnert; 6–0, 6–2	(Czech Republic) Linda Dubská (Russia) Evgeniya Svintsova	(Italy) Valeria Prosperi (Philippines) Katharina Lehnert	(China) Wang Xiyao (Germany) Michaela Frlicka (India) Prerna Bhambri (France) Harmony Tan
March 31	São José dos Campos, Brazil; Clay $10,000; Singles and doubles draws	(Brazil) Paula Cristina Gonçalves; 6–2, 3–6, 6–2	(Brazil) Maria Fernanda Alves	(Brazil) Nathália Rossi (Brazil) Eduarda Piai	(Brazil) Gabriela Cé (Brazil) Nathaly Kurata (Belarus) Anita Safronenka (Brazil) Ingrid Gamarra Martins
March 31	São José dos Campos, Brazil; Clay $10,000; Singles and doubles draws	(Brazil) Maria Fernanda Alves (Brazil) Paula Cristina Gonçalves; 7–6^{(7–0)}, 7–5	(Brazil) Gabriela Cé (Brazil) Eduarda Piai	(Brazil) Nathália Rossi (Brazil) Eduarda Piai	(Brazil) Gabriela Cé (Brazil) Nathaly Kurata (Belarus) Anita Safronenka (Brazil) Ingrid Gamarra Martins
March 31	Šibenik, Croatia; Clay $10,000; Singles and doubles draws	(Serbia) Katarina Jokić; 6–4, 6–1	(Croatia) Iva Mekovec	(Austria) Janina Toljan (Serbia) Milana Špremo	(Czech Republic) Eva Rutarová (Austria) Lena Reichel (Czech Republic) Martina Kubičíková (Bulgaria) Viktoriya Tomova
March 31	Šibenik, Croatia; Clay $10,000; Singles and doubles draws	(Hungary) Ágnes Bukta (Bulgaria) Viktoriya Tomova; 7–6^{(14–12)}, 6–1	(Czech Republic) Eva Rutarová (Czech Republic) Karolína Stuchlá	(Austria) Janina Toljan (Serbia) Milana Špremo	(Czech Republic) Eva Rutarová (Austria) Lena Reichel (Czech Republic) Martina Kubičíková (Bulgaria) Viktoriya Tomova
March 31	Sharm el-Sheikh, Egypt; Hard $10,000; Singles and doubles draws	(Poland) Sandra Zaniewska; 6–2, 6–1	(Romania) Elena-Teodora Cadar	(Spain) Aina Schaffner Riera (Italy) Alessia Camplone	(Slovakia) Vivien Juhászová (Belgium) Britt Geukens (Russia) Eugeniya Pashkova (Czech Republic) Martina Přádová
March 31	Sharm el-Sheikh, Egypt; Hard $10,000; Singles and doubles draws	(Croatia) Jana Fett (Ukraine) Oleksandra Korashvili; 6–4, 7–5	(Egypt) Ola Abou Zekry (Egypt) Mayar Sherif	(Spain) Aina Schaffner Riera (Italy) Alessia Camplone	(Slovakia) Vivien Juhászová (Belgium) Britt Geukens (Russia) Eugeniya Pashkova (Czech Republic) Martina Přádová
March 31	Heraklion, Greece; Hard $10,000; Singles and doubles draws	(Russia) Polina Leykina; 6–2, 6–7^{(3–7)}, 7–5	(Croatia) Ema Mikulčić	(Germany) Anna Zaja (Switzerland) Xenia Knoll	(Poland) Justyna Jegiołka (United Kingdom) Amanda Carreras (Liechtenstein) Kathinka von Deichmann (Spain) Ainhoa Atucha Gómez
March 31	Heraklion, Greece; Hard $10,000; Singles and doubles draws	(Hungary) Csilla Borsányi (Romania) Ilka Csöregi; 4–6, 6–3, [10–6]	(Greece) Valentini Grammatikopoulou (Russia) Polina Leykina	(Germany) Anna Zaja (Switzerland) Xenia Knoll	(Poland) Justyna Jegiołka (United Kingdom) Amanda Carreras (Liechtenstein) Kathinka von Deichmann (Spain) Ainhoa Atucha Gómez
March 31	Santa Margherita di Pula, Italy; Clay $10,000; Singles and doubles draws	(Italy) Alice Balducci; 6–7^{(6–8)}, 6–1, 6–0	(Spain) Inés Ferrer Suárez	(Argentina) Tatiana Búa (Latvia) Jeļena Ostapenko	(France) Angela Leweurs (Italy) Stefania Rubini (Italy) Martina Spigarelli (Slovakia) Karin Morgošová
March 31	Santa Margherita di Pula, Italy; Clay $10,000; Singles and doubles draws	(Italy) Alice Balducci (Romania) Diana Buzean; 3–6, 6–1, [10–1]	(Argentina) Tatiana Búa (Spain) Inés Ferrer Suárez	(Argentina) Tatiana Búa (Latvia) Jeļena Ostapenko	(France) Angela Leweurs (Italy) Stefania Rubini (Italy) Martina Spigarelli (Slovakia) Karin Morgošová
March 31	Shymkent, Kazakhstan; Clay $10,000; Singles and doubles draws	(Bulgaria) Vivian Zlatanova; 7–6^{(7–1)}, 6–0	(Kazakhstan) Alexandra Grinchishina	(Kazakhstan) Kamila Kerimbayeva (Uzbekistan) Albina Khabibulina	(Uzbekistan) Arina Folts (Russia) Daria Lodikova (Uzbekistan) Guzal Yusupova (Russia) Margarita Lazareva
March 31	Shymkent, Kazakhstan; Clay $10,000; Singles and doubles draws	(Russia) Anna Grigoryan (Bulgaria) Vivian Zlatanova; 7–6^{(7–5)}, 6–2	(Ukraine) Diana Bogoliy (Russia) Margarita Lazareva	(Kazakhstan) Kamila Kerimbayeva (Uzbekistan) Albina Khabibulina	(Uzbekistan) Arina Folts (Russia) Daria Lodikova (Uzbekistan) Guzal Yusupova (Russia) Margarita Lazareva
March 31	Lima, Peru; Clay $10,000; Singles and doubles draws	(Argentina) Nadia Podoroska; 6–2, 6–4	(Hungary) Csilla Argyelán	(Argentina) Stephanie Mariel Petit (Argentina) Aranza Salut	(Russia) Yana Sizikova (United States) Jaeda Daniel (Hungary) Naomi Totka (Argentina) María Agustina de Carli
March 31	Lima, Peru; Clay $10,000; Singles and doubles draws	(Serbia) Tamara Čurović (Russia) Yana Sizikova; 6–0, 6–4	(Argentina) Stephanie Mariel Petit (Argentina) Carolina Zeballos	(Argentina) Stephanie Mariel Petit (Argentina) Aranza Salut	(Russia) Yana Sizikova (United States) Jaeda Daniel (Hungary) Naomi Totka (Argentina) María Agustina de Carli
March 31	Antalya, Turkey; Hard $10,000; Singles and doubles draws	(Bulgaria) Julia Terziyska; 7–6^{(7–5)}, 6–2	(Turkey) Melis Sezer	(Slovakia) Lenka Juríková (Germany) Anna Klasen	(Czech Republic) Denisa Allertová (Czech Republic) Natália Vajdová (Russia) Alina Silich (North Macedonia) Lina Gjorcheska
March 31	Antalya, Turkey; Hard $10,000; Singles and doubles draws	(Czech Republic) Denisa Allertová (Slovakia) Chantal Škamlová; 6–2, 6–1	(Turkey) Melis Sezer (Turkey) İpek Soylu	(Slovakia) Lenka Juríková (Germany) Anna Klasen	(Czech Republic) Denisa Allertová (Czech Republic) Natália Vajdová (Russia) Alina Silich (North Macedonia) Lina Gjorcheska
