= 2014 Launceston Tennis International – Singles =

Singles
- 2014 Launceston Tennis International

Final
- Champion: (Australia) Olivia Rogowska
- Runner-up: (France) Irena Pavlovic
- Score: 5–7, 6–4, 6–0

Events
Singles	Doubles
Launceston Tennis International	· 2015 →

Storm Sanders was the defending champion, but was selected to participate for Australia at the 2014 Fed Cup.

Olivia Rogowska won the tournament, defeating Irena Pavlovic in the final, 5–7, 6–4, 6–0.

== Seeds ==
1. (Poland) Magda Linette (first round)
2. (United States) Irina Falconi (first round)
3. (Australia) Olivia Rogowska (champion)
4. (Japan) Erika Sema (semifinals)
5. (Japan) Eri Hozumi (semifinals)
6. (Japan) Yurika Sema (second round)
7. (United States) Julia Cohen (second round)
8. (France) Irena Pavlovic (final)

== Main draw ==
=== Key ===
- Q = Qualifier
- WC = Wild card
- LL = Lucky loser
- Alt = Alternate
- SE = Special exempt
- PR = Protected ranking
- ITF = ITF entry
- JE = Junior exempt
- w/o = Walkover
- r = Retired
- d = Defaulted
- SR = Special ranking

=== Finals ===
Semifinals
5	(Japan) Eri Hozumi	3	6	2
3	(Australia) Olivia Rogowska	6	3	6
4	(Japan) Erika Sema	2	0
8	(France) Irena Pavlovic	6	6

Final
3	(Australia) Olivia Rogowska	5	6	6
8	(France) Irena Pavlovic	7	4	0

=== Top half ===
First round
1	(Poland) M Linette	4	6	6^{1}
(Australia) A Hadzic	6	3	7^{7}
WC	(Australia) P Hon	6	4	7^{8}
WC	(Australia) E Perez	2	6	6^{6}
(Japan) M Inoue	7^{7}	6
(Japan) M Miyamura	6^{5}	4
(Japan) J Namigata	6	1	3
5	(Japan) E Hozumi	4	6	6
3	(Australia) O Rogowska	6	6
Q	(Australia) N Bains	2	3
(Japan) M Imanishi	6	6
Q	(Australia) N Baric	2	2
(United Kingdom) N Broady	6	6
(Australia) T Patterson	2	2
Q	(Thailand) K Buayam	4	2
6	(Japan) Y Sema	6	6

Second round
(Australia) A Hadzic	7	3	6
WC	(Australia) P Hon	5	6	3
(Japan) M Inoue	3	4
5	(Japan) E Hozumi	6	6
3	(Australia) O Rogowska	6	6
(Japan) M Imanishi	2	2
(United Kingdom) N Broady	6	6
6	(Japan) Y Sema	0	3

Quarterfinals
(Australia) A Hadzic	6^{5}	2
5	(Japan) E Hozumi	7^{7}	6
3	(Australia) O Rogowska	6	7
(United Kingdom) N Broady	0	5

Semifinals
5	(Japan) E Hozumi	3	6	2
3	(Australia) O Rogowska	6	3	6

=== Bottom half ===
First round
7	(United States) J Cohen	6	6
(Australia) M Adamczak	2	2
(China) Y Zhang	6	7
(Japan) M Eguchi	3	5
WC	(Australia) J Moore	4	3
(Ukraine) A Kalinina	6	6
(Slovakia) Z Zlochová	6	2	6^{2}
4	(Japan) E Sema	4	6	7^{7}
8	(France) I Pavlovic	6	6
Q	(Serbia) I Jorović	4	2
(Australia) V Rajicic	4	1
(Chinese Taipei) Y-j Chan	6	6
(Japan) H Kuwata	3	6	1
WC	(Italy) J Paolini	6	3	6
(Russia) E Kulichkova	6	3	6
2	(United States) I Falconi	3	6	1

Second round
7	(United States) J Cohen	6	2	0
(China) Y Zhang	1	6	6
(Ukraine) A Kalinina	6^{4}	0
4	(Japan) E Sema	7^{7}	6
8	(France) I Pavlovic	6	6
(Chinese Taipei) Y-j Chan	0	2
WC	(Italy) J Paolini	2	3
(Russia) E Kulichkova	6	6

Quarterfinals
(China) Y Zhang	2	1
4	(Japan) E Sema	6	6
8	(France) I Pavlovic	7	6
(Russia) E Kulichkova	5	1

Semifinals
4	(Japan) E Sema	2	0
8	(France) I Pavlovic	6	6
