= 2014 Launceston Tennis International – Doubles =

Doubles
- 2014 Launceston Tennis International

Final
- Champions: (Australia) Monique Adamczak (Australia) Olivia Rogowska
- Runners-up: (Thailand) Kamonwan Buayam (Slovakia) Zuzana Zlochová
- Score: 6–2, 6–4

Events
Singles	Doubles
Launceston Tennis International	· 2015 →

Ksenia Lykina and Emily Webley-Smith were the defending champions, but both players chose not to participate.

Monique Adamczak and Olivia Rogowska won the tournament, defeating Kamonwan Buayam and Zuzana Zlochová in the final, 6–2, 6–4.

== Seeds ==
1. (Australia) Monique Adamczak / (Australia) Olivia Rogowska (champions)
2. (Chinese Taipei) Chan Yung-jan / (United States) Irina Falconi (first round)
3. (Japan) Eri Hozumi / (Japan) Miki Miyamura (quarterfinals)
4. (United Kingdom) Naomi Broady / (Poland) Magda Linette (quarterfinals; withdrew)

== Draw ==
=== Key ===
- Q = Qualifier
- WC = Wild card
- LL = Lucky loser
- Alt = Alternate
- SE = Special exempt
- PR = Protected ranking
- ITF = ITF entry
- JE = Junior exempt
- w/o = Walkover
- r = Retired
- d = Defaulted
- SR = Special ranking

First round
1	(Australia) M Adamczak (Australia) O Rogowska	6	7
(Japan) M Eguchi (Australia) T Patterson	3	5
(Australia) N Collie (Australia) J Moriarty	2	1
(United States) J Cohen (Bulgaria) A Naydenova	6	6
4	(United Kingdom) N Broady (Poland) M Linette	7^{8}	7
(Australia) J Moore (Australia) E Perez	6^{6}	5
(Japan) E Sema (Japan) Y Sema	6	4	[10]
(Australia) A Hadzic (China) Y Wang	4	6	[7]
(Japan) M Imanishi (Australia) V Rajicic	6	6
Q	(Australia) L Daw (Australia) K Ryan	4	3
(Japan) M Inoue (Japan) H Kuwata	5	3
3	(Japan) E Hozumi (Japan) M Miyamura	7	6
Q	(Australia) P Hon (Serbia) I Jorović	w/o
(Japan) R Fujiwara (Japan) J Namigata
(Thailand) K Buayam (Slovakia) Z Zlochová	6	7
2	(Chinese Taipei) Y-j Chan (United States) I Falconi	3	5

Quarterfinals
1	(Australia) M Adamczak (Australia) O Rogowska	7	6
(United States) J Cohen (Bulgaria) A Naydenova	5	2
4	(United Kingdom) N Broady (Poland) M Linette
(Japan) E Sema (Japan) Y Sema	w/o
(Japan) M Imanishi (Australia) V Rajicic	1	6	[11]
3	(Japan) E Hozumi (Japan) M Miyamura	6	4	[9]
Q	(Australia) P Hon (Serbia) I Jorović	2	6	[7]
(Thailand) K Buayam (Slovakia) Z Zlochová	6	3	[10]

Semifinals
1	(Australia) M Adamczak (Australia) O Rogowska	7^{7}	6
(Japan) E Sema (Japan) Y Sema	6^{4}	4
(Japan) M Imanishi (Australia) V Rajicic	6	4	[2]
(Thailand) K Buayam (Slovakia) Z Zlochová	2	6	[10]

Final
1	(Australia) M Adamczak (Australia) O Rogowska	6	6
(Thailand) K Buayam (Slovakia) Z Zlochová	2	4
