= 2015 Launceston Tennis International – Women's singles =

Women's singles
- 2015 Launceston Tennis International

Final
- Champion: (Russia) Daria Gavrilova
- Runner-up: (Croatia) Tereza Mrdeža
- Score: 6–1, 6–2

Events
| Singles | men | women |
| Doubles | men | women |
| ← 2014 · | Launceston Tennis International | · 2016 → |

Olivia Rogowska was the defending champion, however she chose not to participate.

Daria Gavrilova won the title, defeating Tereza Mrdeža in the final, 6–1, 6–2.

== Seeds ==
1. (United States) Irina Falconi (semifinals)
2. (Japan) Eri Hozumi (quarterfinals)
3. (Russia) Daria Gavrilova (champion)
4. (China) Wang Yafan (quarterfinals)
5. (Japan) Risa Ozaki (first round)
6. (Poland) Katarzyna Piter (first round)
7. (Japan) Junri Namigata (quarterfinals)
8. (Croatia) Tereza Mrdeža (final)

== Main draw ==
=== Key ===
- Q = Qualifier
- WC = Wild card
- LL = Lucky loser
- Alt = Alternate
- SE = Special exempt
- PR = Protected ranking
- ITF = ITF entry
- JE = Junior exempt
- w/o = Walkover
- r = Retired
- d = Defaulted
- SR = Special ranking

=== Finals ===
Semifinals
1 | (United States) Irina Falconi | 6 | 4 | 2
3 | (Russia) Daria Gavrilova | 4 | 6 | 6
8 | (Croatia) Tereza Mrdeža | 6 | 6
(Thailand) Varatchaya Wongteanchai | 0 | 1

Final
3 | (Russia) Daria Gavrilova | 6 | 6
8 | (Croatia) Tereza Mrdeža | 1 | 2

=== Top half ===
First round
1 | (United States) I Falconi | 6 | 6
(Australia) Ar Rodionova | 4 | 1
(China) X Han | 6 | 6
WC | (Australia) S Mendez | 3 | 2
Q | (China) Y Zhang | 6 | 1 | 6
(Austria) P König | 3 | 6 | 3
(China) Z Yang | 6 | 6
5 | (Japan) R Ozaki | 1 | 0
3 | (Russia) D Gavrilova | 6 | 6
(Japan) E Sema | 0 | 2
(China) C Liu | 4 | 7^{7} | 2
Q | (Thailand) N Luangnam | 6 | 6^{3} | 6
(Thailand) N Lertcheewakarn | 6 | 6
(Japan) A Okuno | 1 | 0
(Japan) M Inoue | 3 | 4
7 | (Japan) J Namigata | 6 | 6

Second round
1 | (United States) I Falconi | 4 | 7^{7} | 6
(China) X Han | 6 | 6^{3} | 1
Q | (China) Y Zhang | 4 | 6 | 0
(China) Z Yang | 6 | 4 | 6
3 | (Russia) D Gavrilova | 6 | 6
Q | (Thailand) N Luangnam | 1 | 3
(Thailand) N Lertcheewakarn | 0 | 0
7 | (Japan) J Namigata | 6 | 6

Quarterfinals
1 | (United States) I Falconi | 6 | 6
(China) Z Yang | 3 | 4
3 | (Russia) D Gavrilova | 6 | 7
7 | (Japan) J Namigata | 4 | 5

Semifinals
1 | (United States) I Falconi | 6 | 4 | 2
3 | (Russia) D Gavrilova | 4 | 6 | 6

=== Bottom half ===
First round
8 | (Croatia) T Mrdeža | 6 | 6
WC | (Australia) A Bai | 2 | 0
(China) J Lu | 1 | 1
WC | (Australia) D Aiava | 6 | 6
(China) Yan Wang | 7 | 6
(Slovakia) Z Zlochová | 5 | 3
(Australia) J Moore | 5 | 7^{7} | 6^{5}
4 | (China) Yaf Wang | 7 | 6^{3} | 7^{7}
6 | (Poland) K Piter | 0 | 5
Q | (United States) A Glatch | 6 | 7
(Thailand) V Wongteanchai | 6 | 6^{3} | 6
WC | (Australia) V Rajicic | 4 | 7^{7} | 2
(Croatia) J Fett | 6 | 6
(France) F Ferro | 2 | 3
Q | (China) F Xun | 2 | 6^{5}
2 | (Japan) E Hozumi | 6 | 7^{7}

Second round
8 | (Croatia) T Mrdeža | 6 | 6
WC | (Australia) D Aiava | 4 | 4
(China) Yan Wang | 6 | 3 | 2
4 | (China) Yaf Wang | 3 | 6 | 6
Q | (United States) A Glatch | 6^{4} | 6^{6}
(Thailand) V Wongteanchai | 7^{7} | 7^{8}
(Croatia) J Fett | 6 | 4 | 6^{7}
2 | (Japan) E Hozumi | 2 | 6 | 7^{9}

Quarterfinals
8 | (Croatia) T Mrdeža | 1 | 6 | 6
4 | (China) Yaf Wang | 6 | 3 | 4
(Thailand) V Wongteanchai | 6 | 6
2 | (Japan) E Hozumi | 4 | 3

Semifinals
8 | (Croatia) T Mrdeža | 6 | 6
(Thailand) V Wongteanchai | 0 | 1
