= 2015 Launceston Tennis International – Women's doubles =

Women's doubles
- 2015 Launceston Tennis International

Final
- Champions: (China) Han Xinyun (Japan) Junri Namigata
- Runners-up: (China) Wang Yafan (China) Yang Zhaoxuan
- Score: 6–4, 3–6, [10–6]

Events
Singles	men	women
Doubles	men	women
← 2014 ·	Launceston Tennis International	· 2016 →

Monique Adamczak and Olivia Rogowska were the defending champions, however both players chose not to participate.

The top seeds Han Xinyun and Junri Namigata won the title, defeating Wang Yafan and Yang Zhaoxuan in the final, 6–4, 3–6, [10–6].

== Seeds ==
1. (China) Han Xinyun / (Japan) Junri Namigata (champions)
2. (Australia) Jessica Moore / (Australia) Abbie Myers (first round)
3. (China) Liu Chang / (China) Lu Jiajing (quarterfinals)
4. (Thailand) Varatchaya Wongteanchai / (Thailand) Varunya Wongteanchai (first round)

== Draw ==
=== Key ===
- Q = Qualifier
- WC = Wild card
- LL = Lucky loser
- Alt = Alternate
- SE = Special exempt
- PR = Protected ranking
- ITF = ITF entry
- JE = Junior exempt
- w/o = Walkover
- r = Retired
- d = Defaulted
- SR = Special ranking

First round
1	(China) X Han (Japan) J Namigata	6	2	[10]
(Australia) S Peers (Australia) S Sanders	1	6	[8]
(Australia) A Bai (Japan) A Okuno	3	1
Q	(Croatia) J Fett (Austria) P König	6	6
3	(China) C Liu (China) J Lu	6	6
WC	(Australia) D Aiava (Australia) S Mendez	4	2
(Japan) M Inoue (Thailand) N Lertcheewakarn	6	7^{7}
WC	(Australia) N Collie (Australia) K Ryan	1	6^{4}
(Australia) K Wlodarczak (China) S Xu	2	2
(United States) I Falconi (Australia) T Patterson	6	6
(Japan) E Hozumi (Japan) E Sema	7^{7}	6
4	(Thailand) Vara Wongteanchai (Thailand) Varu Wongteanchai	6^{3}	2
(China) Yaf Wang (China) Z Yang	6	4
(Australia) N Bains (Slovakia) Z Zlochová	3	0^{r}
Q	(Croatia) T Mrdeža (Australia) V Rajicic	6	6
2	(Australia) J Moore (Australia) A Myers	2	4

Quarterfinals
1	(China) X Han (Japan) J Namigata	6	6
Q	(Croatia) J Fett (Austria) P König	1	3
3	(China) C Liu (China) J Lu	3	4
(Japan) M Inoue (Thailand) N Lertcheewakarn	6	6
(United States) I Falconi (Australia) T Patterson	6^{6}	2
(Japan) E Hozumi (Japan) E Sema	7^{8}	6
(China) Yaf Wang (China) Z Yang	6	6
Q	(Croatia) T Mrdeža (Australia) V Rajicic	1	1

Semifinals
1	(China) X Han (Japan) J Namigata	7	7
(Japan) M Inoue (Thailand) N Lertcheewakarn	5	5
(Japan) E Hozumi (Japan) E Sema	4	6	[3]
(China) Yaf Wang (China) Z Yang	6	3	[10]

Final
1	(China) X Han (Japan) J Namigata	6	3	[10]
(China) Yaf Wang (China) Z Yang	4	6	[6]
