= 2015 Launceston Tennis International – Men's singles =

Men's singles
- 2015 Launceston Tennis International

Final
- Champion: (United States) Bjorn Fratangelo
- Runner-up: (South Korea) Chung Hyeon
- Score: 4–6, 6–2, 7–5

Events
Singles	men	women
Doubles	men	women
- Launceston Tennis International

This is the first edition of the event.

Bjorn Fratangelo won it, beating Chung Hyeon in the final by a score of 4–6, 6–2, 7–5.

== Seeds ==
1. (Japan) Yūichi Sugita (second round, withdrew)
2. (India) Somdev Devvarman (first round)
3. (United Kingdom) Kyle Edmund (first round, retired)
4. (Japan) Hiroki Moriya (first round)
5. (South Korea) Hyeon Chung (final)
6. (Australia) Luke Saville (second round)
7. (Moldova) Radu Albot (second round)
8. (United States) Bradley Klahn (quarterfinals)

== Draw ==
Key

- Q = Qualifier
- WC = Wild card
- LL = Lucky loser
- Alt = Alternate
- ITF = ITF entry
- PR = Protected ranking
- SR = Special ranking
- SE = Special exempt
- JE = Junior exempt
- JR = Junior Accelerator Programme entrant
- CO = College Accelerator Programme entrant
- NG = Next Gen Accelerator Program entrant
- w/o = Walkover
- r = Retired
- d = Defaulted

=== Finals ===
Semifinals
(United States) Bjorn Fratangelo	6	0
(China) Zhang Ze	3	0^{r}
5	(South Korea) Chung Hyeon	5	6	7
(Australia) Jordan Thompson	7	3	5

Final
(United States) Bjorn Fratangelo	4	6	7
5	(South Korea) Chung Hyeon	6	2	5

=== Top half ===
First round
1/Q	(Japan) Y Sugita	6	4	6
WC	(Australia) M Polmans	4	6	3
(United States) B Fratangelo	6	6
WC	(Australia) B Mott	2	4
Q	(Australia) Gavin van Peperzeel	2	6	2
(Australia) D Kelly	6	3	6
(Australia) M Ebden	0	4
8	(United States) B Klahn	6	6
3	(United Kingdom) K Edmund	6	3	0^{r}
WC	(Australia) M Barton	3	6	2
(China) Z Zhang	6	6
(Australia) A Bolt	4	4
Q	(New Zealand) F Tearney	5	3
(New Zealand) J Statham	7	6
(China) D Wu	4	3
7	(Moldova) R Albot	6	6

Second round
1/Q	(Japan) Y Sugita
(United States) B Fratangelo	w/o
(Australia) D Kelly	7	3	2
8	(United States) B Klahn	5	6	6
WC	(Australia) M Barton	3	7^{7}	6^{5}
(China) Z Zhang	6	6^{5}	7^{7}
(New Zealand) J Statham	6	3	6
7	(Moldova) R Albot	3	6	2

Quarterfinals
(United States) B Fratangelo	7^{7}	6
8	(United States) B Klahn	6^{2}	3
(China) Z Zhang	6	6
(New Zealand) J Statham	4	3

Semifinals
(United States) B Fratangelo	6	0
(China) Z Zhang	3	0^{r}

=== Bottom half ===
First round
5	(South Korea) H Chung	3	7	7
(Australia) M Reid	6	5	5
(United States) M Krueger	6	4	6
Q	(Australia) O Jasika	3	6	3
(United Kingdom) B Klein	7^{7}	6^{2}	6
(India) S Singh	6^{5}	7^{7}	2
WC	(Australia) H Bourchier	6	7^{12}
4	(Japan) H Moriya	1	6^{10}
6	(Australia) L Saville	5	6	6
(Australia) A Whittington	7	4	0
(Japan) Yuya Kibi	3	6	5
(Australia) J Thompson	6	3	7
(Australia) M Banes	4	2
(Australia) B Mitchell	6	6
(Australia) C O'Connell	6	6
2	(India) S Devvarman	2	1

Second round
5	(South Korea) H Chung	4	6	6
(United States) M Krueger	6	3	4
(United Kingdom) B Klein	6	6^{5}	4
WC	(Australia) H Bourchier	2	7^{7}	6
6	(Australia) L Saville	4	4
(Australia) J Thompson	6	6
(Australia) B Mitchell	3	6	6
(Australia) C O'Connell	6	3	4

Quarterfinals
5	(South Korea) H Chung	6	3	6
WC	(Australia) H Bourchier	0	6	1
(Australia) J Thompson	6	6
(Australia) B Mitchell	2	3

Semifinals
5	(South Korea) H Chung	5	6	7
(Australia) J Thompson	7	3	5
