= 2015 Launceston Tennis International – Men's doubles =

Men's doubles
- 2015 Launceston Tennis International

Final
- Champions: (Moldova) Radu Albot (United States) Mitchell Krueger
- Runners-up: (Australia) Adam Hubble (New Zealand) Jose Rubin Statham
- Score: 3–6, 7–5, [11-9]

Events
Singles	men	women
Doubles	men	women
- Launceston Tennis International

This is the first edition of the event.

== Seeds ==
1. (Australia) Alex Bolt / (Australia) Andrew Whittington (quarterfinals)
2. (Moldova) Radu Albot / (United States) Mitchell Krueger (champions)
3. (India) Somdev Devvarman / (India) Sanam Singh (withdrew)
4. (Australia) Maverick Banes / (Australia) Gavin van Peperzeel (quarterfinals)

== Draw ==
Key

- Q = Qualifier
- WC = Wild card
- LL = Lucky loser
- Alt = Alternate
- ITF = ITF entry
- PR = Protected ranking
- SR = Special ranking
- SE = Special exempt
- JE = Junior exempt
- JR = Junior Accelerator Programme entrant
- CO = College Accelerator Programme entrant
- NG = Next Gen Accelerator Program entrant
- w/o = Walkover
- r = Retired
- d = Defaulted

First round
1	(Australia) A Bolt (Australia) A Whittington	6	7^{7}
(United States) B Fratangelo (United States) T Sandgren	3	6^{2}
(Australia) D Kelly (China) D Wu	4	2
WC	(Australia) H Bourchier (Australia) M Polmans	6	6
Alt	(United States) A Sarkissian (New Zealand) F Tearney	6	6
WC	(Australia) M Barton (Australia) C O'Connell	4	1
(Japan) Yuya Kibi (Japan) Y Sugita	1	1
(Australia) A Hubble (New Zealand) J Statham	6	6
(United Kingdom) B Klein (Australia) L Saville	6	4	[4]
(Japan) H Moriya (China) Z Zhang	2	6	[10]
WC	(United States) Patrick Davidson (Australia) Jacob Grills	4	3
4	(Australia) M Banes (Australia) Gavin van Peperzeel	6	6
(Australia) B Mitchell (Australia) J Thompson	6	6
(Australia) O Jasika (Australia) B Mott	3	4
(Australia) C Ball (Australia) M Reid	4	4
2	(Moldova) R Albot (United States) M Krueger	6	6

Quarterfinals
1	(Australia) A Bolt (Australia) A Whittington	4	7^{10}	[10]
WC	(Australia) H Bourchier (Australia) M Polmans	6	6^{8}	[12]
Alt	(United States) A Sarkissian (New Zealand) F Tearney	5	3
(Australia) A Hubble (New Zealand) J Statham	7	6
(Japan) H Moriya (China) Z Zhang	6	6
4	(Australia) M Banes (Australia) G van Peperzeel	2	2
(Australia) B Mitchell (Australia) J Thompson
2	(Moldova) R Albot (United States) M Krueger	w/o

Semifinals
(Australia) H Bourchier (Australia) M Polmans	3	4
(Australia) A Hubble (New Zealand) J Statham	6	6
(Japan) H Moriya (China) Z Zhang
2	(Moldova) R Albot (United States) M Krueger	w/o

Final
(Australia) A Hubble (New Zealand) J Statham	6	5	[9]
2	(Moldova) R Albot (United States) M Krueger	3	7	[11]
