= Azra Hadzic =

Australian tennis player

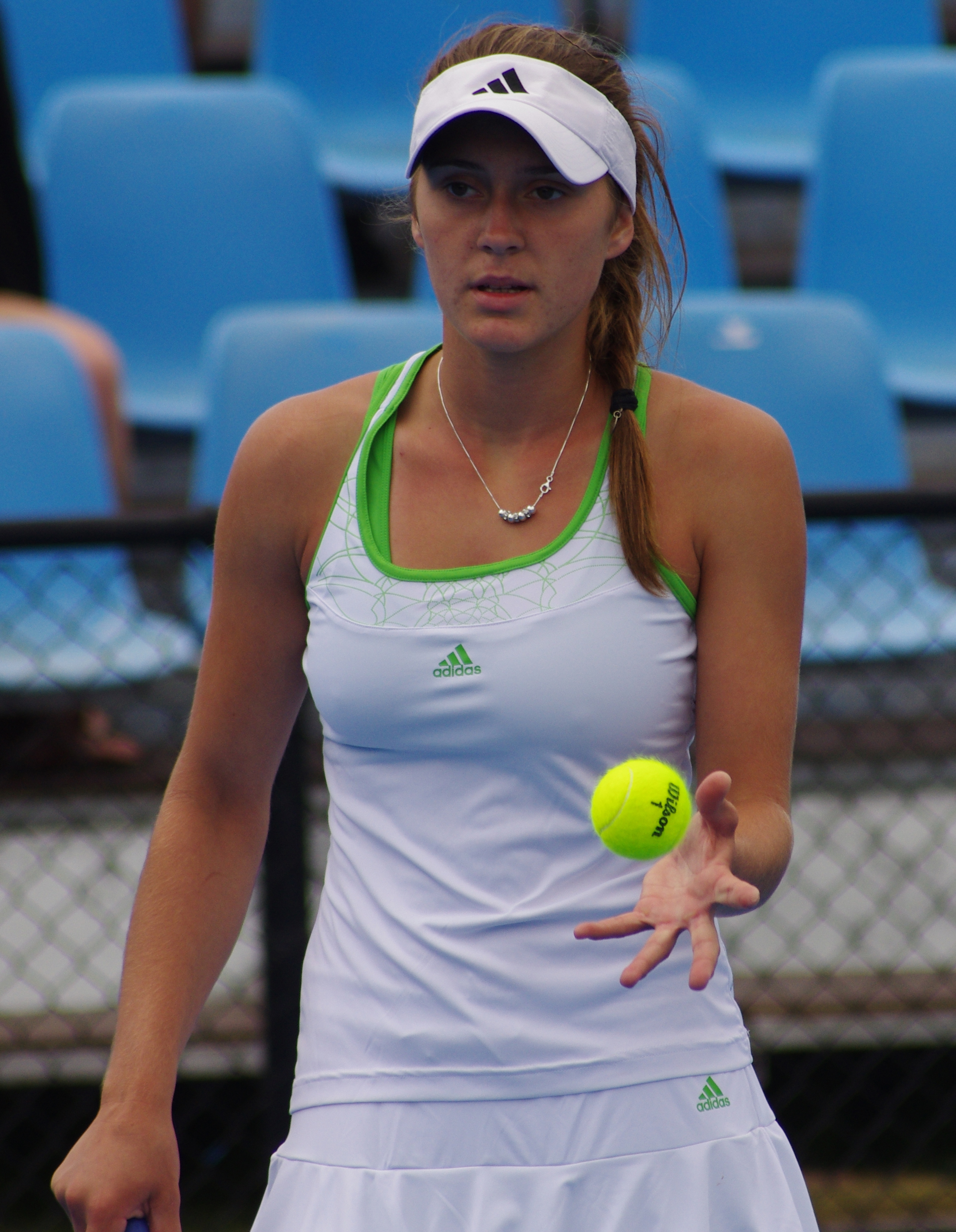
- Hadzic at the 2012 Sydney International
- Country (sports): Australia
- Born: 26 November 1994 (age 30); Box Hill, Victoria, Australia
- Height: 1.72 m (5 ft 8 in)
- Turned pro: 2009
- Retired: 2014
- Prize money: $37,343

Singles
- Career record: 75–61
- Career titles: 1 ITF
- Highest ranking: No. 301 (1 April 2013)

Grand Slam singles results
- Australian Open: Q1 (2013)

Doubles
- Career record: 18–34
- Career titles: 0
- Highest ranking: No. 512 (27 January 2014)

Grand Slam doubles results
- Australian Open: 1R (2014)

Azra Hadzic (Bosnian: Azra Hadžić, pronounced [xǎdʒiːtɕ]; born 26 November 1994) is a retired Australian tennis player of Bosnian descent.

Hadzic won one singles title on the ITF Circuit in her career. On 1 April 2013, she reached her best singles ranking of world No. 301. On 27 January 2014, she peaked at No. 512 in the doubles rankings.

Hadzic started playing on the ITF Circuit in 2009 and made her WTA Tour debut playing in the qualifying tournament of the 2012 Sydney International. She made her Grand Slam debut in 2013 with a wildcard into the qualifying draw of the Australian Open and later that year won her maiden ITF title in Cairns. She was awarded a wildcard to the main doubles draw at the 2014 Australian Open.

== Career ==
=== 2009 ===
In 2009, Hadzic made her debut on the ITF Women's Circuit, playing a handful of events in Bosnia and Australia.

=== 2010 ===
In September 2010, Hadzic had a breakthrough tournament at the $25k event in Cairns. She reached the quarterfinals, after having to qualify and en route defeated the second seed Yurika Sema, in straight sets. This result gave her a WTA ranking for the first time.

=== 2011 ===
In 2011, Hadzic continued playing ITF events and repeated her quarterfinal finish at the Cairns Tennis International. In December, she reached the semifinals of the Optus Australian 18s Championships, losing to eventual champion Ashleigh Barty.

=== 2012 ===
In January, Hadzic made her WTA debut with a wildcard into qualifying for the Sydney International, losing to Chanelle Scheepers in straight sets. In February, she had a career-best win, defeating the world's number-one ranked junior Irina Khromacheva in qualifying for a $25k tournament in Launceston. Later in the year, she reached the quarterfinals of the $25k events in Rockhampton and Esperance, losing on both occasions to Olivia Rogowska. In December, she reached the final of the 2012 Optus Australian 18s Championships.

=== 2013 ===
Hadzic again received a wildcard into the qualifying tournament of the Sydney International, losing to Coco Vandeweghe in straight sets. She then made her senior Grand Slam debut with a wildcard into Australian Open qualifying, where she lost to Michelle Larcher de Brito. In February, she reached her first ITF final in Mildura, losing to the Russian Ksenia Lykina. She made the semifinals of ITF tournaments in Sydney (twice) and Toowoomba before reaching her second career ITF final at the $15k tournament in Cairns where she claimed her maiden senior title, defeating Jessica Moore in three sets.

=== 2014 ===
Hadzic started season with a wildcard for Hobart qualifying but lost to Andrea Hlaváčková.

Partnering Jessica Moore, she was awarded a wildcard into the main draw of the Australian Open where they faced the 11th-seeded team of Anna-Lena Grönefeld and Mirjana Lučić-Baroni, both former Grand Slam champions, losing in straight sets.

In February, Hadzic knocked out top seed and world No. 116, Magda Linette, in the first round of the Launceston Tennis International. Following a second-round win over Priscilla Hon, Hadzic lost in the quarterfinals to Eri Hozumi.

Hadzic announced her retirement from tennis in March 2014.

== ITF finals ==
=== Singles (1–1) ===
Legend $25,000 tournaments $15,000 tournaments	Finals by surface Hard (1–0) Grass (0–1)

Result	No.	Date	Location	Surface	Opponent	Score
Loss	1.	18 February 2013	Mildura, Australia	Grass	(Russia) Ksenia Lykina	6–7^{(3–7)}, 3–6
Win	1.	16 September 2013	Cairns, Australia	Hard	(Australia) Jessica Moore	6–3, 3–6, 6–2
