= 2015 Launceston Tennis International =

- Date: 8–15 February
- Edition: 1st (men); 4th (women)
- Category: ATP Challenger Tour (men); ITF Women's Circuit (women)
- Prize money: $50,000
- Surface: Hard
- Location: Launceston, Tasmania, Australia
- Venue: Launceston Regional Tennis Centre

Champions

Men's singles
- (United States) Bjorn Fratangelo

Women's singles
- (Russia) Daria Gavrilova

Men's doubles
- (Moldova) Radu Albot / (United States) Mitchell Krueger

Women's doubles
- (China) Han Xinyun / (Japan) Junri Namigata
← 2014 ·	Launceston Tennis International	· 2016 →

The 2015 Launceston Tennis International was a professional tennis tournament played on outdoor hard courts. It was the first edition (for men) and fourth edition (for women) of the tournament which is part of the 2015 ATP Challenger Tour and the 2015 ITF Women's Circuit, offering a total of $50,000 in prize money for both genders. It took place in Launceston, Tasmania, Australia, on 8–15 February 2015.

== Men's singles entrants ==
=== Seeds ===
Country	Player	Rank^{1}	Seed
JPN	Yūichi Sugita	130	1
IND	Somdev Devvarman	139	2
GBR	Kyle Edmund	148	3
JPN	Hiroki Moriya	150	4
KOR	Hyeon Chung	151	5
AUS	Luke Saville	162	6
MDA	Radu Albot	166	7
USA	Bradley Klahn	167	8

- ^{1} Rankings as of 2 February 2015

=== Other entrants ===
The following players received wildcards into the singles main draw:

- (Australia) Harry Bourchier
- (Australia) Blake Mott
- (Australia) Christopher O'Connell
- (Australia) Marc Polmans

The following players received entry from the qualifying draw:

- (Australia) Omar Jasika
- (Australia) Gavin van Peperzeel
- (Japan) Yūichi Sugita
- (New Zealand) Finn Tearney

== Women's singles entrants ==
=== Seeds ===
Country	Player	Rank^{1}	Seed
USA	Irina Falconi	110	1
JPN	Eri Hozumi	151	2
RUS	Daria Gavrilova	154	3
CHN	Wang Yafan	160	4
JPN	Risa Ozaki	178	5
POL	Katarzyna Piter	179	6
JPN	Junri Namigata	192	7
CRO	Tereza Mrdeža	224	8

- ^{1} Rankings as of 2 February 2015

=== Other entrants ===
The following players received wildcards into the singles main draw:

- (Australia) Destanee Aiava
- (Australia) Alison Bai
- (Australia) Seone Mendez
- (Australia) Viktorija Rajicic

The following players received entry from the qualifying draw:

- (United States) Alexa Glatch
- (Thailand) Nudnida Luangnam
- (China) Xun Fangying
- (China) Zhang Yuxuan

== Champions ==
=== Men's singles ===
- (United States) Bjorn Fratangelo def. (South Korea) Chung Hyeon, 4–6, 6–2, 7–5

=== Women's singles ===
- (Russia) Daria Gavrilova def. (Croatia) Tereza Mrdeža, 6–1, 6–2

=== Men's doubles ===
- (Moldova) Radu Albot / (United States) Mitchell Krueger def. (Australia) Adam Hubble / (New Zealand) Jose Rubin Statham, 3–6, 7–5, [11–9]

=== Women's doubles ===
- (China) Han Xinyun / (Japan) Junri Namigata def. (China) Wang Yafan / (China) Yang Zhaoxuan, 6–4, 3–6, [10–6]
