= 2014 Launceston Tennis International =

- Date: 3–9 February
- Edition: 3rd
- Category: ITF Women's Circuit
- Prize money: $50,000
- Surface: Hard
- Location: Launceston, Tasmania, Australia

Champions

Singles
- (Australia) Olivia Rogowska

Doubles
- (Australia) Monique Adamczak / (Australia) Olivia Rogowska
Launceston Tennis International	· 2015 →

The 2014 Launceston Tennis International was a professional tennis tournament played on outdoor hard courts. It was the third edition of the tournament and part of the 2014 ITF Women's Circuit, offering a total of $50,000 in prize money. It took place in Launceston, Tasmania, Australia, on 3–9 February 2014.

== Singles main draw entrants ==
=== Seeds ===
Country	Player	Rank^{1}	Seed
POL	Magda Linette	116	1
USA	Irina Falconi	131	2
AUS	Olivia Rogowska	140	3
JPN	Erika Sema	184	4
JPN	Eri Hozumi	185	5
JPN	Yurika Sema	193	6
USA	Julia Cohen	196	7
FRA	Irena Pavlovic	221	8

- ^{1} Rankings as of 27 January 2014

=== Other entrants ===
The following players received wildcards into the singles main draw:

- (Australia) Priscilla Hon
- (Australia) Jessica Moore
- (Italy) Jasmine Paolini
- (Australia) Ellen Perez

The following players received entry from the qualifying draw:

- (Australia) Naiktha Bains
- (Australia) Nives Baric
- (Thailand) Kamonwan Buayam
- (Serbia) Ivana Jorović

== Champions ==
=== Singles ===
- (Australia) Olivia Rogowska def. (France) Irena Pavlovic 5–7, 6–4, 6–0

=== Doubles ===
- (Australia) Monique Adamczak / (Australia) Olivia Rogowska def. (Thailand) Kamonwan Buayam / (Slovakia) Zuzana Zlochová 6–2, 6–4
