= Kamonwan Buayam =

Thai tennis player (born 1996)

Kamonwan Buayam กมลวรรณ บัวแย้ม
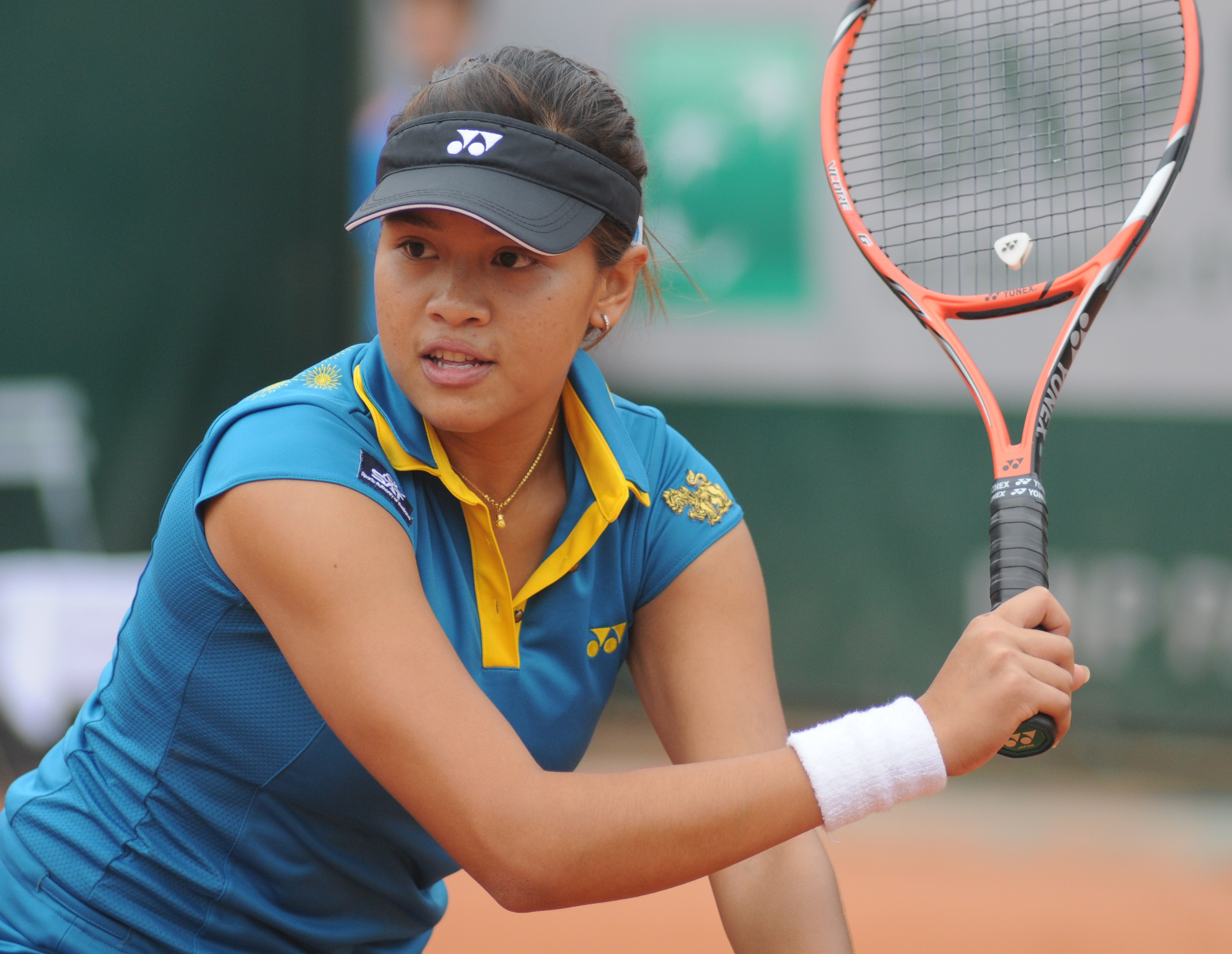
- Country (sports): Thailand
- Residence: Chonburi, Thailand
- Born: 15 February 1996 (age 30) Chonburi, Thailand
- Plays: Right (two-handed backhand)
- Prize money: $48,747

Singles
- Career record: 126–131
- Career titles: 2 ITF
- Highest ranking: No. 343 (2 May 2016)

Doubles
- Career record: 118–124
- Career titles: 3 ITF
- Highest ranking: No. 310 (20 February 2017)

Kamonwan Buayam (Thai: กมลวรรณ บัวแย้ม; born 15 February 1996) is a Thai former professional tennis player.

She has career-high WTA rankings of 343 in singles (achieved on 2 May 2016) and 310 in doubles (set on 20 February 2017).

== Career ==
Buayam made her main-draw debut on WTA Tour at the 2015 PTT Pattaya Open, in the doubles event partnering Luksika Kumkhum.

== ITF Circuit finals ==
=== Singles (2–1) ===
Legend $10/15,000 tournaments	Finals by surface Hard (2–1)

Result	Date	Tournament	Surface	Opponent	Score
Win	6 June 2015	W10 Bangkok, Thailand	Hard	(Australia) Nicole Collie	6–4, 6–3
Win	3 October 2015	W15 Bangkok, Thailand	Hard	(Thailand) Varunya Wongteanchai	6–1, 4–6, 6–2
Loss	25 October 2015	W15 Bangkok, Thailand	Hard	(China) Lu Jiajing	6–7^{(3)}, 7–5, 3–6

=== Doubles (3–13) ===
Legend $50,000 tournaments $25,000 tournaments $10/15,000 tournaments	Finals by surface Hard (3–12) Clay (0–1)

Outcome	No.	Date	Tournament	Surface	Partner	Opponents	Score
Runner-up	1.	14 July 2012	W10 Pattaya, Thailand	Hard	(China) Deng Mengning	(Japan) Yurina Koshino (Japan) Yumi Miyazaki	4–6, 3–6
Runner-up	2.	29 September 2013	W10 Antalya, Turkey	Clay	(Czech Republic) Barbora Štefková	(Germany) Lena-Marie Hofmann (Germany) Anna Klasen	2–6, 2–6
Runner-up	3.	9 February 2014	Launceston International, Australia	Hard	(Slovakia) Zuzana Zlochová	(Australia) Olivia Rogowska (Australia) Monique Adamczak	2–6, 4–6
Runner-up	4.	4 July 2014	W10 Bangkok, Thailand	Hard	(Thailand) Nungnadda Wannasuk	(Japan) Miyu Kato (Japan) Akiko Omae	0–6, 0–6
Runner-up	5.	1 November 2014	W15 Phuket, Thailand	Hard (i)	(Chinese Taipei) Lee Pei-chi	(Thailand) Peangtarn Plipuech (Thailand) Nicha Lertpitaksinchai	5–7, 3–6
Runner-up	6.	29 May 2015	W10 Bangkok, Thailand	Hard	(South Korea) Kim Da-bin	(Chinese Taipei) Hsu Ching-wen (Thailand) Nungnadda Wannasuk	6–4, 6–7^{(4)}, [3–10]
Runner-up	7.	5 June 2015	W10 Bangkok, Thailand	Hard	(South Korea) Kim Da-bin	(Oman) Fatma Al-Nabhani (Thailand) Nungnadda Wannasuk	3–6, 5–7
Winner	1.	29 August 2015	W10 Sharm El Sheikh, Egypt	Hard	(France) Victoria Muntean	(China) Wang Danni (China) Yu Yuanyi	7–5, 6–4
Runner-up	8.	12 September 2015	W10 Sharm El Sheikh, Egypt	Hard	(Russia) Yana Sizikova	(Belgium) Britt Geukens (France) Victoria Muntean	1–6, 6–3, [8–10]
Runner-up	9.	28 May 2016	W25 Incheon, South Korea	Hard	(Chinese Taipei) Lee Pei-chi	(South Korea) Han Sung-hee (Japan) Makoto Ninomiya	3–6, 1–6
Runner-up	10.	30 September 2016	W25 Hua Hin, Thailand	Hard	(Chinese Taipei) Lee Pei-chi	(Poland) Katarzyna Kawa (Brazil) Laura Pigossi	5–7, 7–6^{(4)}, [6–10]
Runner-up	11.	7 October 2016	W10 Hua Hin, Thailand	Hard	(Chinese Taipei) Lee Pei-chi	(Chinese Taipei) Cho I-hsuan (China) Zhang Yukun	6–2, 3–6, [7–10]
Runner-up	12.	25 November 2016	W10 Hua Hin, Thailand	Hard	(Hong Kong) Zhang Ling	(Malaysia) Jawairiah Noordin (Indonesia) Jessy Rompies	4–6, 3–6
Runner-up	13.	16 December 2016	Pune Championships, India	Hard	(United Kingdom) Katy Dunne	(Indonesia) Beatrice Gumulya (Montenegro) Ana Veselinović	4–6, 3–6
Winner	2.	17 March 2018	W15 Sharm El Sheikh, Egypt	Hard	(Russia) Angelina Gabueva	(Romania) Laura Ioana Andrei (Bulgaria) Julia Terziyska	1–6, 6–4, [10–5]
Winner	3.	24 March 2018	W15 Sharm El Sheikh, Egypt	Hard	(Russia) Angelina Gabueva	(United Kingdom) Jodie Burrage (Sweden) Jacqueline Cabaj Awad	7–5, 5–7, [10–7]
