= 2019 Launceston Tennis International =

- Date: 28 January–3 February 2019
- Edition: 5th (men); 8th (women)
- Category: ATP Challenger Tour (Challenger 80); ITF Women's World Tennis Tour (W60)
- Prize money: $54,160 (ATP) $60,000 (ITF)
- Surface: Hard
- Location: Launceston, Tasmania, Australia

Champions

Men's singles
- (South Africa) Lloyd Harris

Women's singles
- (Kazakhstan) Elena Rybakina

Men's doubles
- (Australia) Max Purcell / (Australia) Luke Saville

Women's doubles
- (Chinese Taipei) Chang Kai-chen / (Chinese Taipei) Hsu Ching-wen
← 2018 ·	Launceston International	· 2020 →

The 2019 Launceston Tennis International was a professional tennis tournament played on hard courts. It was the fifth (men) and eighth (women) editions of the tournament which was part of the 2019 ATP Challenger Tour and the 2019 ITF Women's World Tennis Tour. It took place in Launceston, Tasmania, Australia between 28 January and 3 February 2019.

== Men's singles main-draw entrants ==
=== Seeds ===
Country	Player	Rank^{1}	Seed
RSA	Lloyd Harris	119	1
JPN	Tatsuma Ito	150	2
ESP	Pedro Martínez	165	3
AUS	Marc Polmans	169	4
AUT	Sebastian Ofner	180	5
JPN	Hiroki Moriya	185	6
EGY	Mohamed Safwat	186	7
FRA	Stéphane Robert	197	8
ITA	Stefano Napolitano	198	9
ITA	Federico Gaio	209	10
JPN	Go Soeda	211	11
ITA	Lorenzo Giustino	222	12
ITA	Gian Marco Moroni	226	13
BRA	Guilherme Clezar	234	14
GBR	Jay Clarke	236	15
ISR	Dudi Sela	239	16

- ^{1} Rankings are as of 14 January 2019.

=== Other entrants ===
The following players received wildcards into the singles main draw:

- (Australia) Harry Bourchier
- (Australia) Jacob Grills
- (Australia) Rinky Hijikata
- (Australia) Christopher O'Connell
- (Australia) Andrew Whittington

The following players received entry into the singles main draw using protected rankings:

- (Germany) Daniel Altmaier
- (United States) Daniel Nguyen

The following players received entry into the singles main draw using their ITF World Tennis Ranking:

- (Canada) Steven Diez
- (Spain) David Pérez Sanz
- (Spain) Jordi Samper Montaña
- (Russia) Alexander Zhurbin

The following players received entry from the qualifying draw:

- (Italy) Alessandro Bega
- (Japan) Yuta Shimizu

== Women's singles main-draw entrants ==
=== Seeds ===
Country	Player	Rank^{1}	Seed
GER	Laura Siegemund	110	1
JPN	Nao Hibino	115	2
UKR	Marta Kostyuk	116	3
RUS	Irina Khromacheva	135	4
ESP	Paula Badosa Gibert	141	5
ESP	Georgina García Pérez	144	6
BUL	Viktoriya Tomova	151	7
ROU	Irina Bara	156	8

- ^{1} Rankings are as of 14 January 2019.

=== Other entrants ===
The following players received wildcards into the singles main draw:

- (Australia) Kaylah McPhee
- (Australia) Abbie Myers
- (Australia) Belinda Woolcock

The following player received entry using a protected ranking:

- (Argentina) Nadia Podoroska

The following players received entry from the qualifying draw:

- (Australia) Alison Bai
- (Australia) Naiktha Bains
- (Chinese Taipei) Chang Kai-chen
- (Canada) Leylah Annie Fernandez
- (Australia) Maddison Inglis
- (Australia) Isabelle Wallace

== Champions ==
=== Men's singles ===
- (South Africa) Lloyd Harris def. (Italy) Lorenzo Giustino 6–2, 6–2.

=== Women's singles ===
- (Kazakhstan) Elena Rybakina def. (Russia) Irina Khromacheva, 7–5, 3–3, ret.

=== Men's doubles ===
- (Australia) Max Purcell / (Australia) Luke Saville def. (Japan) Hiroki Moriya / (Egypt) Mohamed Safwat 7–5, 6–4.

=== Women's doubles ===
- (Chinese Taipei) Chang Kai-chen / (Chinese Taipei) Hsu Ching-wen def. (Australia) Alexandra Bozovic / (Australia) Isabelle Wallace, 6–2, 6–4
