= 2019 Launceston Tennis International – Women's singles =

Women's singles
- 2019 Launceston Tennis International

Final
- Champion: (Kazakhstan) Elena Rybakina
- Runner-up: (Russia) Irina Khromacheva
- Score: 7–5, 3–3, ret.

Events
Singles	men	women
Doubles	men	women
← 2018 ·	Launceston International	· 2020 →

Gabriella Taylor was the defending champion, but lost in the first round to Paula Badosa Gibert.

Elena Rybakina won the title after Irina Khromacheva retired in the final at 7–5, 3–3.

== Seeds ==
1. (Germany) Laura Siegemund (second round)
2. (Japan) Nao Hibino (quarterfinals)
3. (Ukraine) Marta Kostyuk (second round)
4. (Russia) Irina Khromacheva (final, retired)
5. (Spain) Paula Badosa Gibert (second round)
6. (Spain) Georgina García Pérez (second round)
7. (Bulgaria) Viktoriya Tomova (second round)
8. (Romania) Irina Bara (first round)

== Draw ==
=== Key ===
- Q = Qualifier
- WC = Wild card
- LL = Lucky loser
- Alt = Alternate
- SE = Special exempt
- PR = Protected ranking
- ITF = ITF entry
- JE = Junior exempt
- w/o = Walkover
- r = Retired
- d = Defaulted
- SR = Special ranking

=== Finals ===
Semifinals
(Kazakhstan) Elena Rybakina	6	4	6
(Belgium) Maryna Zanevska	1	6	2
4	(Russia) Irina Khromacheva	6	6
(Australia) Arina Rodionova	3	1

Final
(Kazakhstan) Elena Rybakina	7	3
4	(Russia) Irina Khromacheva	5	3^{r}

=== Top half ===
First round
1	(Germany) L Siegemund	6	6
(Australia) D Aiava	4	1
(Kazakhstan) E Rybakina	4	6	6
Q	(Australia) N Bains	6	1	4
Q	(Australia) I Wallace	3	4
Q	(Chinese Taipei) K-c Chang	6	6
(Australia) J Fourlis	3	4
6	(Spain) G García Pérez	6	6
3	(Ukraine) M Kostyuk	6	6
(China) Xiy Wang	3	4
(Spain) S Soler Espinosa	4	7	2
(Belgium) M Zanevska	6	5	6
PR	(Argentina) N Podoroska	6	6
(Australia) E Perez	2	4
WC	(Australia) B Woolcock	5	6	2
7	(Bulgaria) V Tomova	7	3	6

Second round
1	(Germany) L Siegemund	3	6	3
(Kazakhstan) E Rybakina	6	4	6
Q	(Chinese Taipei) K-c Chang	6	7^{7}
6	(Spain) G García Pérez	4	6^{5}
3	(Ukraine) M Kostyuk	4	6	6^{4}
(Belgium) M Zanevska	6	4	7^{7}
PR	(Argentina) N Podoroska	6	6
7	(Bulgaria) V Tomova	2	1

Quarterfinals
(Kazakhstan) E Rybakina	6	6
Q	(Chinese Taipei) K-c Chang	2	0
(Belgium) M Zanevska	6	6
PR	(Argentina) N Podoroska	4	3

Semifinals
(Kazakhstan) E Rybakina	6	4	6
(Belgium) M Zanevska	1	6	2

=== Bottom half ===
First round
5	(Spain) P Badosa Gibert	1	6	6
(United Kingdom) G Taylor	6	3	2
Q	(Australia) A Bai	6^{6}	6^{3}
WC	(Australia) A Myers	7^{8}	7^{7}
Q	(Australia) M Inglis	6	6
(United States) A Muhammad	2	3
WC	(Australia) K McPhee	7	2	2
4	(Russia) I Khromacheva	5	6	6
8	(Romania) I Bara	2	3
Q	(Canada) LA Fernandez	6	6
(Australia) L Cabrera	6	5	2
(Australia) Ar Rodionova	2	7	6
(Georgia (country)) E Gorgodze	6	3	3
(Australia) K Birrell	2	6	6
(Australia) Z Hives	5	6	6^{5}
2	(Japan) N Hibino	7	3	7^{7}

Second round
5	(Spain) P Badosa Gibert	6	3	0^{r}
WC	(Australia) A Myers	4	6	3
Q	(Australia) M Inglis	1	4
4	(Russia) I Khromacheva	6	6
Q	(Canada) LA Fernandez	3	6	5
(Australia) Ar Rodionova	6	1	7
(Australia) K Birrell	6	6^{2}	4
2	(Japan) N Hibino	3	7^{7}	6

Quarterfinals
WC	(Australia) A Myers	5	6	3
4	(Russia) I Khromacheva	7	3	6
(Australia) Ar Rodionova	7	6
2	(Japan) N Hibino	5	2

Semifinals
4	(Russia) I Khromacheva	6	6
(Australia) Ar Rodionova	3	1
