= 2019 Launceston Tennis International – Women's doubles =

Women's doubles
- 2019 Launceston Tennis International

Final
- Champions: (Chinese Taipei) Chang Kai-chen (Chinese Taipei) Hsu Ching-wen
- Runners-up: (Australia) Alexandra Bozovic (Australia) Isabelle Wallace
- Score: 6–2, 6–4

Events
Singles	men	women
Doubles	men	women
← 2018 ·	Launceston International	· 2020 →

Jessica Moore and Ellen Perez were the defending champions, but Moore chose to participate at the 2019 St. Petersburg Ladies' Trophy instead. Perez partnered alongside compatriot Arina Rodionova, but lost in the semifinals to Chang Kai-chen and Hsu Ching-wen.

Chang and Hsu won the title, defeating Alexandra Bozovic and Isabelle Wallace in the final, 6–2, 6–4.

== Seeds ==
1. (Australia) Ellen Perez / (Australia) Arina Rodionova (semifinals)
2. (Romania) Irina Bara / (Georgia (country)) Ekaterine Gorgodze (quarterfinals, withdrew)
3. (Australia) Lizette Cabrera / (Belgium) Maryna Zanevska (first round)
4. (Japan) Nao Hibino / (Japan) Kyōka Okamura (first round)

== Draw ==
=== Key ===
- Q = Qualifier
- WC = Wild card
- LL = Lucky loser
- Alt = Alternate
- SE = Special exempt
- PR = Protected ranking
- ITF = ITF entry
- JE = Junior exempt
- w/o = Walkover
- r = Retired
- d = Defaulted
- SR = Special ranking

=== Draw ===
First round
1	(Australia) E Perez (Australia) Ar Rodionova	6	5	[11]
(Australia) M Inglis (Australia) K McPhee	1	7	[9]
WC	(Australia) A Berezov (Australia) I Bozicevic	2	0
(Argentina) N Podoroska (China) Xiy Wang	6	6
3	(Australia) L Cabrera (Belgium) M Zanevska	5	6	[7]
(Chinese Taipei) K-c Chang (Chinese Taipei) C-w Hsu	7	1	[10]
(Spain) G García Pérez (Kazakhstan) E Rybakina	6	6
WC	(Australia) M Jovanovic (Australia) A Parnaby	2	2
(Japan) S Akita (Japan) M Kobori	4	6	[11]
(Japan) M Minokoshi (Japan) E Sema	6	4	[13]
(Australia) A Bozovic (Australia) I Wallace	7	0	[10]
4	(Japan) N Hibino (Japan) K Okamura	5	6	[7]
(Australia) D Aiava (Australia) N Bains	6	6
WC	(Australia) G Da Silva-Fick (Australia) T Patterson	3	3
(Australia) A Bai (United Kingdom) G Taylor	2	2
2	(Romania) I Bara (Georgia (country)) E Gorgodze	6	6

Quarterfinals
1	(Australia) E Perez (Australia) Ar Rodionova	3	6	[12]
(Argentina) N Podoroska (China) Xiy Wang	6	4	[10]
(Chinese Taipei) K-c Chang (Chinese Taipei) C-w Hsu	7^{7}	6
(Spain) G García Pérez (Kazakhstan) E Rybakina	6^{5}	3
(Japan) M Minokoshi (Japan) E Sema	3	5
(Australia) A Bozovic (Australia) I Wallace	6	7
(Australia) D Aiava (Australia) N Bains	w/o
2	(Romania) I Bara (Georgia (country)) E Gorgodze

Semifinals
1	(Australia) E Perez (Australia) Ar Rodionova	3	2
(Chinese Taipei) K-c Chang (Chinese Taipei) C-w Hsu	6	6
(Australia) A Bozovic (Australia) I Wallace	7^{7}	7
(Australia) D Aiava (Australia) N Bains	6^{5}	5

Final
(Chinese Taipei) K-c Chang (Chinese Taipei) C-w Hsu	6	6
(Australia) A Bozovic (Australia) I Wallace	2	4
