= 2020 Launceston International – Men's doubles =

Men's doubles
- 2020 Launceston International

Final
- Champions: (United States) Evan King (Zimbabwe) Benjamin Lock
- Runners-up: (Belgium) Kimmer Coppejans (Spain) Sergio Martos Gornés
- Score: 3–6, 6–3, [10–8]

Events
Singles	men	women
Doubles	men	women
← 2019 ·	Launceston International	· 2021 →

Max Purcell and Luke Saville were the defending champions but only Purcell chose to defend his title, partnering Jake Delaney. Purcell lost in the first round to Harri Heliövaara and Sem Verbeek.

Evan King and Benjamin Lock won the title after defeating Kimmer Coppejans and Sergio Martos Gornés 3–6, 6–3, [10–8] in the final.

== Seeds ==
1. (Spain) Gerard Granollers / (Spain) David Vega Hernández (first round)
2. (Switzerland) Luca Margaroli / (Italy) Andrea Vavassori (first round)
3. (Finland) Harri Heliövaara / (Netherlands) Sem Verbeek (quarterfinals)
4. (United States) Nathan Pasha / (United States) Max Schnur (semifinals)

== Draw ==
=== Key ===
- Q = Qualifier
- WC = Wild card
- LL = Lucky loser
- Alt = Alternate
- SE = Special exempt
- PR = Protected ranking
- ITF = ITF entry
- JE = Junior exempt
- w/o = Walkover
- r = Retired
- d = Defaulted
- SR = Special ranking

First round
1	(Spain) G Granollers (Spain) D Vega Hernández	4	2
(Germany) D Altmaier (Germany) J Lenz	6	6
(Slovenia) B Kavčič (Egypt) M Safwat	4	4
Alt	(Australia) Jacob Grills (Australia) C Puttergill	6	6
3	(Finland) H Heliövaara (Netherlands) S Verbeek	6	4	[10]
WC	(Australia) Ja Delaney (Australia) M Purcell	3	6	[6]
WC	(Australia) M Banes (Australia) B Ellis	6	6^{7}	[5]
(United States) E King (Zimbabwe) B Lock	3	7^{9}	[10]
(United Kingdom) L Broady (Canada) F Peliwo	5	7^{10}	[10]
Alt	(Croatia) B Gojo (Greece) M Pervolarakis	7	6^{8}	[6]
(United Kingdom) B Klein (Australia) S Puodziunas	7^{7}	6^{5}	[8]
4	(United States) N Pasha (United States) M Schnur	6^{3}	7^{7}	[10]
WC	(Australia) H Bourchier (Australia) A Santillan	6	6
(Canada) S Diez (Netherlands) M Vervoort	3	4
(Belgium) K Coppejans (Spain) S Martos Gornés	6^{5}	6	[10]
2	(Switzerland) L Margaroli (Italy) A Vavassori	7^{7}	2	[7]

Quarterfinals
(Germany) D Altmaier (Germany) J Lenz	6^{4}	2
Alt	(Australia) J Grills (Australia) C Puttergill	7^{7}	6
3	(Finland) H Heliövaara (Netherlands) S Verbeek	4	5
(United States) E King (Zimbabwe) B Lock	6	7
(United Kingdom) L Broady (Canada) F Peliwo	3	3
4	(United States) N Pasha (United States) M Schnur	6	6
WC	(Australia) H Bourchier (Australia) A Santillan	6	6^{7}	[5]
(Belgium) K Coppejans (Spain) S Martos Gornés	4	7^{9}	[10]

Semifinals
Alt	(Australia) J Grills (Australia) C Puttergill	6	2	[6]
(United States) E King (Zimbabwe) B Lock	3	6	[10]
4	(United States) N Pasha (United States) M Schnur	5	4
(Belgium) K Coppejans (Spain) S Martos Gornés	7	6

Final
(United States) E King (Zimbabwe) B Lock	3	6	[10]
(Belgium) K Coppejans (Spain) S Martos Gornés	6	3	[8]
