= 2019 Launceston Tennis International – Men's singles =

Men's singles
- 2019 Launceston Tennis International

Final
- Champion: (South Africa) Lloyd Harris
- Runner-up: (Italy) Lorenzo Giustino
- Score: 6–2, 6–2

Events
| Singles | men | women |
| Doubles | men | women |
- Launceston Tennis International

Marc Polmans was the defending champion but lost in the second round to Tristan Lamasine.

Lloyd Harris won the title after defeating Lorenzo Giustino 6–2, 6–2 in the final.

== Seeds ==
All seeds receive a bye into the second round.

1. (South Africa) Lloyd Harris (champion)
2. (Japan) Tatsuma Ito (third round)
3. (Spain) Pedro Martínez (third round, retired)
4. (Australia) Marc Polmans (second round)
5. (Austria) Sebastian Ofner (third round)
6. (Japan) Hiroki Moriya (second round)
7. (Egypt) Mohamed Safwat (second round)
8. (France) Stéphane Robert(second round)
9. (Italy) Stefano Napolitano (second round)
10. (Italy) Federico Gaio (second round)
11. (Japan) Go Soeda (third round)
12. (Italy) Lorenzo Giustino (final)
13. (Italy) Gian Marco Moroni (second round)
14. (Brazil) Guilherme Clezar (second round)
15. (United Kingdom) Jay Clarke (quarterfinals, retired)
16. (Israel) Dudi Sela (semifinals)

== Draw ==
Key

- Q = Qualifier
- WC = Wild card
- LL = Lucky loser
- Alt = Alternate
- ITF = ITF entry
- PR = Protected ranking
- SR = Special ranking
- SE = Special exempt
- JE = Junior exempt
- JR = Junior Accelerator Programme entrant
- CO = College Accelerator Programme entrant
- NG = Next Gen Accelerator Program entrant
- w/o = Walkover
- r = Retired
- d = Defaulted

=== Finals ===
Quarterfinals
1 | (South Africa) Lloyd Harris | 6 | 7^{7}
(Spain) Nicola Kuhn | 4 | 6^{3}
16 | (Israel) Dudi Sela | 7^{8} | 7
(Australia) Max Purcell | 6^{6} | 5
(Australia) Luke Saville | 6 | 6
(France) Tristan Lamasine | 4 | 4
12 | (Italy) Lorenzo Giustino | 3 | 7 | 4
15 | (United Kingdom) Jay Clarke | 6 | 5 | 1^{r}

Semifinals
1 | (South Africa) Lloyd Harris | 6 | 6
16 | (Israel) Dudi Sela | 3 | 3
(Australia) Luke Saville | 6^{5} | 6 | 5
12 | (Italy) Lorenzo Giustino | 7^{7} | 2 | 7

Final
1 | (South Africa) Lloyd Harris | 6 | 6
12 | (Italy) Lorenzo Giustino | 2 | 2

=== Top half ===
==== Section 1 ====
First round
(Australia) B Ellis | 7^{7} | 6
WC | (Australia) C O'Connell | 6^{4} | 4
(Australia) B Mousley | 6^{3} | 0^{r}
WC | (Australia) H Bourchier | 7^{7} | 1
(Spain) N Kuhn | 6 | 7
WC | (Australia) A Whittington | 1 | 5
(Spain) E López Pérez | 6 | 6
(Germany) S Fanselow | 4 | 2

Second round
1 | (South Africa) L Harris | 6 | 6
(Australia) B Ellis | 2 | 3
WC | (Australia) H Bourchier | 7^{7} | 6
13 | (Italy) GM Moroni | 6^{5} | 3
10 | (Italy) F Gaio | 1 | 4
(Spain) N Kuhn | 6 | 6
(Spain) E López Pérez | 4^{r}
5 | (Austria) S Ofner | 4

Third round
1 | (South Africa) L Harris | 6 | 6
WC | (Australia) H Bourchier | 3 | 3
(Spain) N Kuhn | 7^{7} | 6
5 | (Austria) S Ofner | 6^{2} | 3

Quarterfinals
1 | (South Africa) L Harris | 6 | 7^{7}
(Spain) N Kuhn | 4 | 6^{3}

==== Section 2 ====
First round
PR | (United States) D Nguyen | 6 | 2 | 7
(Australia) D Kelly | 3 | 6 | 5
(Australia) A Harris | 1 | 7^{7} | 6
WC | (Australia) Rinky Hijikata | 6 | 6^{5} | 3
ITF | (Canada) S Diez | 3 | 3
(Australia) M Purcell | 6 | 6
PR | (Germany) D Altmaier | 6 | 4 | 4
(Japan) Y Takahashi | 4 | 6 | 6

Second round
3 | (Spain) P Martínez | 7 | 7^{7}
PR | (United States) D Nguyen | 5 | 6^{2}
(Australia) A Harris | 3 | 2
16 | (Israel) D Sela | 6 | 6
9 | (Italy) S Napolitano | 5 | 2
(Australia) M Purcell | 7 | 6
(Japan) Y Takahashi | 6 | 6
6 | (Japan) H Moriya | 3 | 4

Third round
3 | (Spain) P Martínez | 4 | 1^{r}
16 | (Israel) D Sela | 6 | 5
(Australia) M Purcell | 6 | 6
(Japan) Y Takahashi | 4 | 4

Quarterfinals
16 | (Israel) D Sela | 7^{8} | 7
(Australia) M Purcell | 6^{6} | 5

=== Bottom half ===
==== Section 3 ====
First round
(Australia) L Saville | 6 | 6
ITF | (Russia) A Zhurbin | 2 | 2
ITF | (Spain) J Samper Montaña | 3 | 3
ITF | (Spain) D Pérez Sanz | 6 | 6
(Australia) A Vukic | 3 | 2
(Chinese Taipei) T-h Yang | 6 | 6
(France) T Lamasine | 6 | 6
(Japan) Renta Tokuda | 4 | 1

Second round
7 | (Egypt) M Safwat | 2 | 4
(Australia) L Saville | 6 | 6
ITF | (Spain) D Pérez Sanz | 0 | 6 | 2
11 | (Japan) G Soeda | 6 | 3 | 6
14 | (Brazil) G Clezar | 5 | 6^{2}
(Chinese Taipei) T-h Yang | 7 | 7^{7}
(France) T Lamasine | 6 | 4 | 6
4 | (Australia) M Polmans | 3 | 6 | 3

Third round
(Australia) L Saville | 6 | 6
11 | (Japan) G Soeda | 4 | 2
(Chinese Taipei) T-h Yang | 3 | 2
(France) T Lamasine | 6 | 6

Quarterfinals
(Australia) L Saville | 6 | 6
(France) T Lamasine | 4 | 4

==== Section 4 ====
First round
(Japan) Makoto Ochi | 1 | 1
(Australia) M Banes | 6 | 6
(South Korea) Y-s Chung | 6 | 6
(New Zealand) R Statham | 4 | 3
Q | (Japan) Y Shimizu | 6 | 3
(Australia) A Santillan | 4 | 2^{r}
WC | (Australia) Jacob Grills | 6^{2} | 6 | 6
Q | (Italy) A Bega | 7^{7} | 2 | 3

Second round
8 | (France) S Robert | 3 | 6^{7}
(Australia) M Banes | 6 | 7^{9}
(South Korea) Y-s Chung | 3 | 7^{7} | 3
12 | (Italy) L Giustino | 6 | 6^{1} | 6
15 | (United Kingdom) J Clarke | 7 | 6
Q | (Japan) Y Shimizu | 5 | 1
WC | (Australia) J Grills | 2 | 4
2 | (Japan) T Ito | 6 | 6

Third round
(Australia) M Banes | 6^{10} | 3
12 | (Italy) L Giustino | 7^{12} | 6
15 | (United Kingdom) J Clarke | 6 | 6^{3} | 7
2 | (Japan) T Ito | 2 | 7^{7} | 5

Quarterfinals
12 | (Italy) L Giustino | 3 | 7 | 4
15 | (United Kingdom) J Clarke | 6 | 5 | 1^{r}
