= 2018 Launceston Tennis International – Men's doubles =

Men's doubles
- 2018 Launceston Tennis International

Final
- Champions: (Australia) Alex Bolt (Australia) Bradley Mousley
- Runners-up: (United States) Sekou Bangoura (United States) Nathan Pasha
- Score: 7–6^{(8–6)}, 6–0

Events
Singles	men	women
Doubles	men	women
- Launceston Tennis International

Bradley Mousley and Luke Saville were the defending champions but chose to defend their title with different partners. Mousley partnered Alex Bolt and successfully defended his title. Saville partnered Matt Reid but lost in the quarterfinals to Max Purcell and Andrew Whittington.

Bolt and Mousley won the title after defeating Sekou Bangoura and Nathan Pasha 7–6^{(8–6)}, 6–0 in the final.

== Seeds ==
1. (Australia) Matt Reid / (Australia) Luke Saville (quarterfinals)
2. (Australia) Alex Bolt / (Australia) Bradley Mousley (champions)
3. (Spain) Gerard Granollers / (Spain) Marcel Granollers (quarterfinals, withdrew)
4. (Australia) Steven de Waard / (Australia) Marc Polmans (first round)

== Draw ==
Key

- Q = Qualifier
- WC = Wild card
- LL = Lucky loser
- Alt = Alternate
- ITF = ITF entry
- PR = Protected ranking
- SR = Special ranking
- SE = Special exempt
- JE = Junior exempt
- JR = Junior Accelerator Programme entrant
- CO = College Accelerator Programme entrant
- NG = Next Gen Accelerator Program entrant
- w/o = Walkover
- r = Retired
- d = Defaulted

First round
1	(Australia) M Reid (Australia) L Saville	6	6
WC	(Australia) J Frawley (Australia) O Jasika	4	4
(Australia) M Purcell (Australia) A Whittington	6	6
(Belgium) K Coppejans (India) VS Prashanth	1	4
4	(Australia) S de Waard (Australia) M Polmans	3	4
(China) Z Li (France) S Robert	6	6
(United States) E King (United States) M Schnur	6^{9}	6	[8]
(United States) S Bangoura (United States) N Pasha	7^{11}	2	[10]
WC	(Australia) H Bourchier (Australia) Jacob Grills	4	3
WC	(Australia) M Banes (Australia) Gavin van Peperzeel	6	6
(Germany) D Altmaier (Germany) T Pütz
3	(Spain) G Granollers (Spain) M Granollers	w/o
(United States) N Lammons (United States) A Lawson	6	7^{7}
(United Kingdom) B Klein (New Zealand) R Statham	2	6^{5}
PR	(United States) K King (South Africa) D O'Brien	6^{7}	7^{7}	[9]
2	(Australia) A Bolt (Australia) B Mousley	7^{9}	6^{1}	[11]

Quarterfinals
1	(Australia) M Reid (Australia) L Saville	2	3
(Australia) M Purcell (Australia) A Whittington	6	6
(China) Z Li (France) S Robert	5	3
(United States) S Bangoura (United States) N Pasha	7	6
WC	(Australia) M Banes (Australia) G van Peperzeel	w/o
3	(Spain) G Granollers (Spain) M Granollers
(United States) N Lammons (United States) A Lawson	3	6^{4}
2	(Australia) A Bolt (Australia) B Mousley	6	7^{7}

Semifinals
(Australia) M Purcell (Australia) A Whittington	4	6^{8}
(United States) S Bangoura (United States) N Pasha	6	7^{10}
WC	(Australia) M Banes (Australia) G van Peperzeel	6	4	[7]
2	(Australia) A Bolt (Australia) B Mousley	4	6	[10]

Final
(United States) S Bangoura (United States) N Pasha	6^{6}	0
2	(Australia) A Bolt (Australia) B Mousley	7^{8}	6
