= 2018 Launceston Tennis International – Men's singles =

Men's singles
- 2018 Launceston Tennis International

Final
- Champion: (Australia) Marc Polmans
- Runner-up: (Australia) Bradley Mousley
- Score: 6–2, 6–2

Events
Singles	men	women
Doubles	men	women
- Launceston Tennis International

Noah Rubin was the defending champion but chose not to defend his title.

Marc Polmans won the title after defeating Bradley Mousley 6–2, 6–2 in the final.

== Seeds ==
1. (Spain) Marcel Granollers (semifinals)
2. (Japan) Yoshihito Nishioka (first round, retired)
3. (United States) Kevin King (quarterfinals)
4. (United States) Evan King (first round)
5. (France) Stéphane Robert (second round)
6. (Australia) Alex Bolt (first round)
7. (Australia) Jason Kubler (quarterfinals)
8. (United States) Christian Harrison (first round)

== Draw ==
Key

- Q = Qualifier
- WC = Wild card
- LL = Lucky loser
- Alt = Alternate
- ITF = ITF entry
- PR = Protected ranking
- SR = Special ranking
- SE = Special exempt
- JE = Junior exempt
- JR = Junior Accelerator Programme entrant
- CO = College Accelerator Programme entrant
- NG = Next Gen Accelerator Program entrant
- w/o = Walkover
- r = Retired
- d = Defaulted

=== Finals ===
Semifinals
1	(Spain) Marcel Granollers	3	6	6^{5}
(Australia) Bradley Mousley	6	3	7^{7}
WC	(Australia) Andrew Harris	1	4
(Australia) Marc Polmans	6	6

Final
(Australia) Bradley Mousley	2	2
(Australia) Marc Polmans	6	6

=== Top half ===
First round
1	(Spain) M Granollers	6^{4}	6	6
(Australia) M Purcell	7^{7}	2	3
(Belgium) K Coppejans	2	6	6
(Canada) S Diez	6	4	1
(United Kingdom) B Klein	4	6	6^{5}
Q	(Australia) M Matosevic	6	4	7^{7}
(United States) A Sarkissian	6	6
8	(United States) C Harrison	3	3
3	(United States) K King	6	7
(Serbia) D Petrović	2	5
(Germany) D Altmaier	5^{r}
(Chinese Taipei) T-h Yang	6
Q	(United States) N Lammons	7^{9}	5	2
(Australia) B Mousley	6^{7}	7	6
Q	(France) G Mina	6^{4}	1
5	(France) S Robert	7^{7}	6

Second round
1	(Spain) M Granollers	6	6
(Belgium) K Coppejans	0	1
Q	(Australia) M Matosevic	5	3
(United States) A Sarkissian	7	6
3	(United States) K King	6	7^{7}
(Chinese Taipei) T-h Yang	3	6^{5}
(Australia) B Mousley	7^{7}	6
5	(France) S Robert	6^{5}	4

Quarterfinals
1	(Spain) M Granollers	6	3	6
(United States) A Sarkissian	1	6	3
3	(United States) K King	7^{8}	6^{6}	3
(Australia) B Mousley	6^{6}	7^{8}	6

Semifinals
1	(Spain) M Granollers	3	6	6^{5}
(Australia) B Mousley	6	3	7^{7}

=== Bottom half ===
First round
7	(Australia) J Kubler	6	6
(China) Z Li	3	0
(Australia) M Banes	6	6
(Australia) O Jasika	1	4
LL	(Monaco) L Catarina	6^{3}	1
(Australia) A Whittington	7^{7}	6
WC	(Australia) A Harris	6	7^{8}
4	(United States) E King	4	6^{6}
6/WC	(Australia) A Bolt	4	2
Q	(Australia) B Mitchell	6	6
(Australia) D Kelly	6	6
WC	(Australia) L Saville	4	4
WC	(Australia) H Bourchier	7	6
(New Zealand) R Statham	5	4
(Australia) M Polmans	6	3
2	(Japan) Y Nishioka	4	0^{r}

Second round
7	(Australia) J Kubler	6	6
(Australia) M Banes	4	2
(Australia) A Whittington	6	6^{6}	6^{4}
WC	(Australia) A Harris	1	7^{8}	7^{7}
Q	(Australia) B Mitchell	6	3	4
(Australia) D Kelly	4	6	6
WC	(Australia) H Bourchier	3	1
(Australia) M Polmans	6	6

Quarterfinals
7	(Australia) J Kubler	4	5
WC	(Australia) A Harris	6	7
(Australia) D Kelly	4	3
(Australia) M Polmans	6	6

Semifinals
WC	(Australia) A Harris	1	4
(Australia) M Polmans	6	6
