= 2020 Launceston International – Men's singles =

Men's singles
- 2020 Launceston International

Final
- Champion: (Egypt) Mohamed Safwat
- Runner-up: (Australia) Alex Bolt
- Score: 7–6^{(7–5)}, 6–1

Events
Singles	men	women
Doubles	men	women
- Launceston International

Lloyd Harris was the defending champion but chose not to defend his title.

Mohamed Safwat won the title after defeating Alex Bolt 7–6^{(7–5)}, 6–1 in the final.

== Seeds ==
All seeds receive a bye into the second round.

1. (Australia) Marc Polmans (second round)
2. (Australia) Alex Bolt (final)
3. (Japan) Tatsuma Ito (second round)
4. (Italy) Lorenzo Giustino (quarterfinals)
5. (United Kingdom) Jay Clarke (second round)
6. (Belgium) Kimmer Coppejans (semifinals)
7. (Australia) Andrew Harris (withdrew)
8. (Germany) Yannick Hanfmann (second round)
9. (Egypt) Mohamed Safwat (champion)
10. (Australia) Max Purcell (second round)
11. (Chinese Taipei) Wu Tung-lin (third round)
12. (South Korea) Lee Duck-hee (third round)
13. (United Kingdom) Liam Broady (quarterfinals)
14. (Germany) Julian Lenz (second round)
15. (Croatia) Viktor Galović (second round)
16. (Australia) Akira Santillan (second round)

== Draw ==
Key

- Q = Qualifier
- WC = Wild card
- LL = Lucky loser
- Alt = Alternate
- ITF = ITF entry
- PR = Protected ranking
- SR = Special ranking
- SE = Special exempt
- JE = Junior exempt
- JR = Junior Accelerator Programme entrant
- CO = College Accelerator Programme entrant
- NG = Next Gen Accelerator Program entrant
- w/o = Walkover
- r = Retired
- d = Defaulted

=== Finals ===
Quarterfinals
13	(United Kingdom) Liam Broady	6^{7}	3
9	(Egypt) Mohamed Safwat	7^{9}	6
4	(Italy) Lorenzo Giustino	6^{10}	7	4
6	(Belgium) Kimmer Coppejans	7^{12}	5	6
(Croatia) Borna Gojo	5	4
(Germany) Daniel Altmaier	7	6
(Italy) Liam Caruana	6^{0}	3
2	(Australia) Alex Bolt	7^{7}	6

Semifinals
9	(Egypt) Mohamed Safwat	4	6	6
6	(Belgium) Kimmer Coppejans	6	4	3
(Germany) Daniel Altmaier	1	4
2	(Australia) Alex Bolt	6	6

Final
9	(Egypt) Mohamed Safwat	7^{7}	6
2	(Australia) Alex Bolt	6^{5}	1

=== Top half ===
==== Section 1 ====
First round
Q	(Japan) N Tajima	6	1	2
(Australia) B Mott	4	6	6
LL	(Japan) Ryota Tanuma	6	6
WC	(Australia) T Schoolkate	2	3
(Australia) T Fancutt	4	3
(Australia) J Kubler	6	6
(Finland) H Heliövaara	3	3
(Greece) M Pervolarakis	6	6

Second round
1	(Australia) M Polmans	3	4
(Australia) B Mott	6	6
LL	(Japan) R Tanuma	3	2
13	(United Kingdom) L Broady	6	6
9	(Egypt) M Safwat	7^{7}	6
(Australia) J Kubler	6^{1}	0
(Greece) M Pervolarakis	6	4	6
5	(United Kingdom) J Clarke	4	6	4

Third round
(Australia) B Mott	3	6^{4}
13	(United Kingdom) L Broady	6	7^{7}
9	(Egypt) M Safwat	6	6
(Greece) M Pervolarakis	4	4

Quarterfinals
13	(United Kingdom) L Broady	6^{7}	3
9	(Egypt) M Safwat	7^{9}	6

==== Section 2 ====
First round
(Slovenia) B Kavčič	6	7
(Japan) R Noguchi	2	5
(Italy) A Vavassori	6^{6}	6	3
WC	(Australia) D Sweeny	7^{8}	2	6
(Australia) H Bourchier	7^{7}	6
(Canada) F Peliwo	6^{4}	2
(Germany) Tobias Simon	6	7^{7}
WC	(Australia) Alexander Crnokrak	4	6^{5}

Second round
4	(Italy) L Giustino	0	7	7^{9}
(Slovenia) B Kavčič	6	5	6^{7}
WC	(Australia) D Sweeny	6	3	6
16	(Australia) A Santillan	2	6	4
10	(Australia) M Purcell	5	3
(Australia) H Bourchier	7	6
(Germany) T Simon	4	7^{7}	3
6	(Belgium) K Coppejans	6	6^{4}	6

Third round
4	(Italy) L Giustino	6	6
WC	(Australia) D Sweeny	2	3
(Australia) H Bourchier	2	5
6	(Belgium) K Coppejans	6	7

Quarterfinals
4	(Italy) L Giustino	6^{10}	7	4
6	(Belgium) K Coppejans	7^{12}	5	6

=== Bottom half ===
==== Section 3 ====
First round
(United States) Evan Song	0	7^{9}	5
(Croatia) B Gojo	6	6^{7}	7
LL	(Australia) C Puttergill	7^{7}	6
(United States) E King	6^{5}	3
(United Kingdom) B Klein	5	6^{3}
(Germany) D Altmaier	7	7^{7}
(Argentina) MF Descotte	7^{9}	6
(Romania) ND Ionel	6^{7}	2

Second round
Q	(Canada) S Diez	5	2
(Croatia) B Gojo	7	6
LL	(Australia) C Puttergill	4	1
12	(South Korea) D-h Lee	6	6
15	(Croatia) V Galović	4	3
(Germany) D Altmaier	6	6
(Argentina) MF Descotte	7^{7}	6
3	(Japan) T Ito	6^{3}	4

Third round
(Croatia) B Gojo	6^{4}	6	7
12	(South Korea) D-h Lee	7^{7}	2	5
(Germany) D Altmaier	7	6
(Argentina) MF Descotte	5	1

Quarterfinals
(Croatia) B Gojo	5	4
(Germany) D Altmaier	7	6

==== Section 4 ====
First round
(Italy) L Caruana	6	6
PR	(Australia) J Beale	0	1
WC	(Australia) M Romios	1	0
(Australia) Jacob Grills	6	6
(Australia) M Banes	2	6^{8}
(Zimbabwe) B Lock	6	7^{10}
(Australia) D Kelly	6	7^{7}
WC	(Australia) B Ellis	2	6^{3}

Second round
8	(Germany) Y Hanfmann	1	2
(Italy) L Caruana	6	6
(Australia) J Grills	6	4	6^{4}
11	(Chinese Taipei) T-l Wu	4	6	7^{7}
14	(Germany) J Lenz	2	7	6^{3}
(Zimbabwe) B Lock	6	5	7^{7}
(Australia) D Kelly	6^{8}	4
2	(Australia) A Bolt	7^{10}	6

Third round
(Italy) L Caruana	5	6	6
11	(Chinese Taipei) T-l Wu	7	4	4
(Zimbabwe) B Lock	1	1
2	(Australia) A Bolt	6	6

Quarterfinals
(Italy) L Caruana	6^{0}	3
2	(Australia) A Bolt	7^{7}	6
