= 2019 Australian Open – Women's singles qualifying =

Women's singles qualifying
- 2019 Australian Open

Events
Singles	men	women		boys	girls
Doubles	men	women	mixed	boys	girls
WC Singles	men	women	quad
WC Doubles	men	women	quad
Legends	men	women	mixed

Qualification
Singles	men	women
- Australian Open

This article displays the qualifying draw for women's singles at the 2019 Australian Open.

== Seeds ==
1. (Russia) Vera Zvonareva (first round)
2. (Luxembourg) Mandy Minella (second round)
3. (Switzerland) Viktorija Golubic (qualified)
4. (Canada) Bianca Andreescu (qualified)
5. (Ukraine) Anhelina Kalinina (second round)
6. (Serbia) Olga Danilović (first round)
7. (Russia) Veronika Kudermetova (qualified)
8. (Japan) Nao Hibino (first round)
9. (Ukraine) Marta Kostyuk (qualifying competition)
10. (Serbia) Ivana Jorović (qualifying competition)
11. (China) Zhu Lin (qualified)
12. (Russia) Sofya Zhuk (second round)
13. (Czech Republic) Marie Bouzková (first round)
14. (Netherlands) Arantxa Rus (first round)
15. (Hungary) Fanny Stollár (second round)
16. (United States) Jennifer Brady (qualifying competition)
17. (Belgium) Yanina Wickmayer (first round)
18. (United States) Nicole Gibbs (qualifying competition)
19. (United States) Caroline Dolehide (second round)
20. (Russia) Vitalia Diatchenko (second round)
21. (United Kingdom) Harriet Dart (qualified)
22. (Japan) Misaki Doi (qualified)
23. (United States) Varvara Lepchenko (qualified)
24. (Russia) Natalia Vikhlyantseva (qualified)
25. (Russia) Irina Khromacheva (qualifying competition)
26. (Czech Republic) Tereza Smitková (qualifying competition, retired)
27. (United States) Claire Liu (first round)
28. (Czech Republic) Karolína Muchová (qualified)
29. (Spain) Paula Badosa Gibert (qualified)
30. (Uzbekistan) Sabina Sharipova (second round)
31. (Spain) Georgina García Pérez (first round)
32. (Paraguay) Verónica Cepede Royg (first round)

== Qualifiers ==
1. (Australia) Astra Sharma
2. (Japan) Misaki Doi
3. (Switzerland) Viktorija Golubic
4. (Canada) Bianca Andreescu
5. (Czech Republic) Karolína Muchová
6. (Poland) Iga Świątek
7. (Russia) Veronika Kudermetova
8. (Russia) Anna Kalinskaya
9. (Spain) Paula Badosa Gibert
10. (United Kingdom) Harriet Dart
11. (China) Zhu Lin
12. (United States) Varvara Lepchenko
13. (France) Jessika Ponchet
14. (Belgium) Ysaline Bonaventure
15. (Russia) Natalia Vikhlyantseva
16. (Brazil) Beatriz Haddad Maia

== Draw ==
=== First qualifier ===
First round
1	(Russia) Vera Zvonareva	3	2
(Australia) Astra Sharma	6	6
(Russia) Varvara Flink	6	6
(Italy) Anastasia Grymalska	3	1
WC	(Australia) Olivia Rogowska	6	6
(Ukraine) Katarina Zavatska	1	4
(Austria) Barbara Haas	4	4
25	(Russia) Irina Khromacheva	6	6

Second round
(Australia) Astra Sharma	6^{3}	6	6
(Russia) Varvara Flink	7^{7}	2	4
WC	(Australia) Olivia Rogowska	3	2
25	(Russia) Irina Khromacheva	6	6

Qualifying competition
(Australia) Astra Sharma	5	7^{9}	7^{12}
25	(Russia) Irina Khromacheva	7	6^{7}	6^{10}

=== Second qualifier ===
First round
2	(Luxembourg) Mandy Minella	6	4	6
(Turkey) Pemra Özgen	2	6	4
(Spain) Sílvia Soler Espinosa	6	2	1
PR	(Belarus) Olga Govortsova	2	6	6
WC	(Australia) Kaylah McPhee	6	6
(Liechtenstein) Kathinka von Deichmann	3	4
(Russia) Olga Doroshina	3	3
22	(Japan) Misaki Doi	6	6

Second round
2	(Luxembourg) Mandy Minella	1	6	5
PR	(Belarus) Olga Govortsova	6	1	7
WC	(Australia) Kaylah McPhee	6	6^{0}	3
22	(Japan) Misaki Doi	2	7^{7}	6

Qualifying competition
PR	(Belarus) Olga Govortsova	6^{2}	4
22	(Japan) Misaki Doi	7^{7}	6

=== Third qualifier ===
First round
3	(Switzerland) Viktorija Golubic	6	6
(Switzerland) Jil Teichmann	2	4
(United States) Kristie Ahn	6	6
(United Kingdom) Gabriella Taylor	1	1
(South Korea) Han Na-lae	3	2
(Argentina) Paula Ormaechea	6	6
(Bulgaria) Elitsa Kostova	4	2
18	(United States) Nicole Gibbs	6	6

Second round
3	(Switzerland) Viktorija Golubic	6	6
(United States) Kristie Ahn	4	4
(Argentina) Paula Ormaechea	5	2
18	(United States) Nicole Gibbs	7	6

Qualifying competition
3	(Switzerland) Viktorija Golubic	6	7^{7}
18	(United States) Nicole Gibbs	3	6^{3}

=== Fourth qualifier ===
First round
4	(Canada) Bianca Andreescu	6	0
(United Kingdom) Katie Swan	1	0^{r}
(Greece) Valentini Grammatikopoulou	6	6
(Romania) Irina Bara	3	2
PR	(Czech Republic) Lucie Hradecká	6	6
(Georgia (country)) Ekaterine Gorgodze	3	3
(Japan) Ayano Shimizu	6^{7}	6^{6}
26	(Czech Republic) Tereza Smitková	7^{9}	7^{8}

Second round
4	(Canada) Bianca Andreescu	6	6
(Greece) Valentini Grammatikopoulou	4	1
PR	(Czech Republic) Lucie Hradecká	4	3
26	(Czech Republic) Tereza Smitková	6	6

Qualifying competition
4	(Canada) Bianca Andreescu	6	4
26	(Czech Republic) Tereza Smitková	0	1^{r}

=== Fifth qualifier ===
First round
5	(Ukraine) Anhelina Kalinina	6	2	7^{10}
(Italy) Martina Di Giuseppe	4	6	6^{5}
WC	(Australia) Abbie Myers	2	4
(United States) Jamie Loeb	6	6
(Russia) Liudmila Samsonova	6	4	6
WC	(Australia) Gabriella Da Silva-Fick	4	6	3
(Australia) Arina Rodionova	2	4
28	(Czech Republic) Karolína Muchová	6	6

Second round
5	(Ukraine) Anhelina Kalinina	3	4
(United States) Jamie Loeb	6	6
(Russia) Liudmila Samsonova	4	0
28	(Czech Republic) Karolína Muchová	6	6

Qualifying competition
(United States) Jamie Loeb	4	1
28	(Czech Republic) Karolína Muchová	6	6

=== Sixth qualifier ===
First round
6	(Serbia) Olga Danilović	6	6^{4}	5
(Poland) Iga Świątek	1	7^{7}	7
(Spain) Aliona Bolsova Zadoinov	7^{7}	4	7
(Russia) Valentina Ivakhnenko	6^{5}	6	5
(United States) Danielle Lao	6	6
(China) Lu Jiajing	2	2
(Canada) Rebecca Marino	2	2
19	(United States) Caroline Dolehide	6	6

Second round
(Poland) Iga Świątek	7^{7}	6
(Spain) Aliona Bolsova Zadoinov	6^{1}	2
(United States) Danielle Lao	6	2	6
19	(United States) Caroline Dolehide	1	6	1

Qualifying competition
(Poland) Iga Świątek	6	6
(United States) Danielle Lao	1	3

=== Seventh qualifier ===
First round
7	(Russia) Veronika Kudermetova	4	6	6
(Italy) Jasmine Paolini	6	1	3
(Germany) Anna Zaja	6	6
(Poland) Magdalena Fręch	2	3
(Czech Republic) Tereza Martincová	6	1	6
(China) Xun Fangying	1	6	3
(China) Wang Xiyu	6	6
27	(United States) Claire Liu	3	2

Second round
7	(Russia) Veronika Kudermetova	6	6
(Germany) Anna Zaja	4	2
(Czech Republic) Tereza Martincová	6	6
(China) Wang Xiyu	4	3

Qualifying competition
7	(Russia) Veronika Kudermetova	6	5	6
(Czech Republic) Tereza Martincová	2	7	3

=== Eighth qualifier ===
First round
8	(Japan) Nao Hibino	2	4
(Germany) Antonia Lottner	6	6
(Belgium) Maryna Zanevska	6	3	3
PR	(Argentina) Nadia Podoroska	3	6	6
(Russia) Anna Kalinskaya	6	7^{16}
(Netherlands) Quirine Lemoine	1	6^{14}
(Serbia) Dejana Radanović	4	7^{7}	2
20	(Russia) Vitalia Diatchenko	6	6^{4}	6

Second round
(Germany) Antonia Lottner	6	6
PR	(Argentina) Nadia Podoroska	2	3
(Russia) Anna Kalinskaya	6	6
20	(Russia) Vitalia Diatchenko	2	2

Qualifying competition
(Germany) Antonia Lottner	6^{3}	3
(Russia) Anna Kalinskaya	7^{7}	6

=== Ninth qualifier ===
First round
9	(Ukraine) Marta Kostyuk	6	7
(Slovakia) Jana Čepelová	3	5
(France) Amandine Hesse	1	7^{7}	7^{10}
(Netherlands) Lesley Kerkhove	6	6^{4}	6^{8}
(France) Myrtille Georges	2	2
(India) Ankita Raina	6	6
(Czech Republic) Denisa Allertová	3	3
29	(Spain) Paula Badosa Gibert	6	6

Second round
9	(Ukraine) Marta Kostyuk	6	6
(France) Amandine Hesse	3	2
(India) Ankita Raina	6	2	4
29	(Spain) Paula Badosa Gibert	4	6	6

Qualifying competition
9	(Ukraine) Marta Kostyuk	6^{6}	3
29	(Spain) Paula Badosa Gibert	7^{8}	6

=== Tenth qualifier ===
First round
10	(Serbia) Ivana Jorović	6	6
(China) Han Xinyun	2	1
(Bulgaria) Sesil Karatantcheva	6	1	4
(United States) Asia Muhammad	3	6	6
(China) Xu Shilin	6	3	6
(Cyprus) Raluca Șerban	3	6	3
(France) Chloé Paquet	3	6	2
21	(United Kingdom) Harriet Dart	6	4	6

Second round
10	(Serbia) Ivana Jorović	6	4	6
(United States) Asia Muhammad	3	6	4
(China) Xu Shilin	6^{4}	1
21	(United Kingdom) Harriet Dart	7^{7}	6

Qualifying competition
10	(Serbia) Ivana Jorović	6	3	1
21	(United Kingdom) Harriet Dart	1	6	6

=== Eleventh qualifier ===
First round
11	(China) Zhu Lin	6	6
(Kazakhstan) Elena Rybakina	2	4
(Italy) Giulia Gatto-Monticone	2	2
(United States) Allie Kiick	6	6
(Italy) Martina Trevisan	6	1	6
(Czech Republic) Anastasia Zarycká	4	6	2
WC	(Australia) Alexandra Bozovic	4	0
30	(Uzbekistan) Sabina Sharipova	6	6

Second round
11	(China) Zhu Lin	6	7
(United States) Allie Kiick	1	5
(Italy) Martina Trevisan	6	7
30	(Uzbekistan) Sabina Sharipova	3	5

Qualifying competition
11	(China) Zhu Lin	3	7^{7}	6
(Italy) Martina Trevisan	6	6^{2}	1

=== Twelfth qualifier ===
First round
12	(Russia) Sofya Zhuk	5	6	6
(Croatia) Jana Fett	7	2	4
(United States) Christina McHale	6	6
(Australia) Jaimee Fourlis	4	2
(Belgium) Kimberley Zimmermann	0	4
(Croatia) Tereza Mrdeža	6	6
(Bulgaria) Viktoriya Tomova	6	2	6^{6}
23	(United States) Varvara Lepchenko	4	6	7^{10}

Second round
12	(Russia) Sofya Zhuk	3	3
(United States) Christina McHale	6	6
(Croatia) Tereza Mrdeža	1	3
23	(United States) Varvara Lepchenko	6	6

Qualifying competition
(United States) Christina McHale	7	5	6^{3}
23	(United States) Varvara Lepchenko	5	7	7^{10}

=== Thirteenth qualifier ===
First round
13	(Czech Republic) Marie Bouzková	4	6	4
(Czech Republic) Barbora Krejčíková	6	4	6
(Canada) Katherine Sebov	1	4
(France) Jessika Ponchet	6	6
WC	(Australia) Maddison Inglis	3	7	5
WC	(Australia) Naiktha Bains	6	5	7
(Japan) Kurumi Nara	6	7^{7}
32	(Paraguay) Verónica Cepede Royg	2	6^{1}

Second round
(Czech Republic) Barbora Krejčíková	6^{5}	4
(France) Jessika Ponchet	7^{7}	6
WC	(Australia) Naiktha Bains	6	6
(Japan) Kurumi Nara	4	4

Qualifying competition
(France) Jessika Ponchet	6	7
WC	(Australia) Naiktha Bains	1	5

=== Fourteenth qualifier ===
First round
14	(Netherlands) Arantxa Rus	3	4
(Netherlands) Richèl Hogenkamp	6	6
WC	(Australia) Isabelle Wallace	7^{7}	7
(Germany) Sabine Lisicki	6^{5}	5
(United Kingdom) Naomi Broady	4	6	3
(Belgium) Ysaline Bonaventure	6	3	6
(Australia) Lizette Cabrera	6	6
31	(Spain) Georgina García Pérez	0	2

Second round
(Netherlands) Richèl Hogenkamp	6	6
WC	(Australia) Isabelle Wallace	3	2
(Belgium) Ysaline Bonaventure	6	6
(Australia) Lizette Cabrera	4	3

Qualifying competition
(Netherlands) Richèl Hogenkamp	4	3
(Belgium) Ysaline Bonaventure	6	6

=== Fifteenth qualifier ===
First round
15	(Hungary) Fanny Stollár	4	6	6
(China) Zhang Yuxuan	6	4	4
(Montenegro) Danka Kovinić	6	7
(China) Liu Fangzhou	1	5
(Netherlands) Bibiane Schoofs	6	5	6
WC	(Chinese Taipei) Liang En-shuo	2	7	4
(China) Duan Yingying	7^{7}	4	4
24	(Russia) Natalia Vikhlyantseva	6^{5}	6	6

Second round
15	(Hungary) Fanny Stollár	4	0
(Montenegro) Danka Kovinić	6	6
(Netherlands) Bibiane Schoofs	0	3
24	(Russia) Natalia Vikhlyantseva	6	6

Qualifying competition
(Montenegro) Danka Kovinić	5	3
24	(Russia) Natalia Vikhlyantseva	7	6

=== Sixteenth qualifier ===
First round
16	(United States) Jennifer Brady	6	7
(India) Karman Thandi	0	5
(Switzerland) Conny Perrin	5
(Germany) Carina Witthöft	1^{r}
(United States) Lauren Davis	3	3
(Brazil) Beatriz Haddad Maia	6	6
(Slovenia) Kaja Juvan	4	6	7
17	(Belgium) Yanina Wickmayer	6	4	5

Second round
16	(United States) Jennifer Brady	6	6
(Switzerland) Conny Perrin	1	1
(Brazil) Beatriz Haddad Maia	6	6
(Slovenia) Kaja Juvan	3	4

Qualifying competition
16	(United States) Jennifer Brady	3	4
(Brazil) Beatriz Haddad Maia	6	6
