= 2019 Launceston Tennis International – Men's doubles =

Men's doubles
- 2019 Launceston Tennis International

Final
- Champions: (Australia) Max Purcell (Australia) Luke Saville
- Runners-up: (Japan) Hiroki Moriya (Egypt) Mohamed Safwat
- Score: 7–5, 6–4

Events
Singles	men	women
Doubles	men	women
- Launceston Tennis International

Alex Bolt and Bradley Mousley were the defending champions. However, only Mousley chose to defend his title, partnering Pedro Martínez. Mousley lost in the first round to Hiroki Moriya and Mohamed Safwat.

Max Purcell and Luke Saville won the title after defeating Moriya and Safwat 7–5, 6–4 in the final.

== Seeds ==
1. (Australia) Max Purcell / (Australia) Luke Saville (champions)
2. (Uruguay) Ariel Behar / (Spain) Enrique López Pérez (withdrew)
3. (Australia) Matt Reid / (Netherlands) Sem Verbeek (semifinals)
4. (Thailand) Sanchai Ratiwatana / (Thailand) Sonchat Ratiwatana (first round)

== Draw ==
Key

- Q = Qualifier
- WC = Wild card
- LL = Lucky loser
- Alt = Alternate
- ITF = ITF entry
- PR = Protected ranking
- SR = Special ranking
- SE = Special exempt
- JE = Junior exempt
- JR = Junior Accelerator Programme entrant
- CO = College Accelerator Programme entrant
- NG = Next Gen Accelerator Program entrant
- w/o = Walkover
- r = Retired
- d = Defaulted

First round
1	(Australia) M Purcell (Australia) L Saville	6	6
(New Zealand) R Statham (Australia) A Whittington	3	3
(France) T Lamasine (France) S Robert	7	6
ITF	(Canada) S Diez (Russia) A Zhurbin	5	1
3	(Australia) M Reid (Netherlands) S Verbeek	7^{7}	6
WC	(Australia) H Bourchier (Australia) C O'Connell	6^{3}	1
(Sweden) A Göransson (Finland) H Heliövaara	3	6	[10]
(Croatia) T Draganja (Chinese Taipei) T-h Yang	6	3	[5]
WC	(Australia) D Kelly (Australia) A Vukic	4	6^{3}
ITF	(United States) JP Fruttero (Spain) D Pérez Sanz	6	7^{7}
WC	(Australia) M Banes (Australia) B Ellis	6	4	[10]
4	(Thailand) Sa Ratiwatana (Thailand) So Ratiwatana	4	6	[8]
(Japan) H Moriya (Egypt) M Safwat	6	7
(Spain) P Martínez (Australia) B Mousley	3	5
(Australia) A Harris (Australia) A Santillan
2	(Uruguay) A Behar (Spain) E López Pérez

Quarterfinals
1	(Australia) M Purcell (Australia) L Saville	6	6
(France) T Lamasine (France) S Robert	4	3
3	(Australia) M Reid (Netherlands) S Verbeek	6	3	[10]
(Sweden) A Göransson (Finland) H Heliövaara	4	6	[8]
ITF	(United States) JP Fruttero (Spain) D Pérez Sanz	6	3	[12]
WC	(Australia) M Banes (Australia) B Ellis	4	6	[14]
(Japan) H Moriya (Egypt) M Safwat
No Match

Semifinals
1	(Australia) M Purcell (Australia) L Saville	6	2	[12]
3	(Australia) M Reid (Netherlands) S Verbeek	4	6	[10]
WC	(Australia) M Banes (Australia) B Ellis	2	4
(Japan) H Moriya (Egypt) M Safwat	6	6

Final
1	(Australia) M Purcell (Australia) L Saville	7	6
(Japan) H Moriya (Egypt) M Safwat	5	4
