= Launceston International =

Launceston Tennis International
- 2020 Launceston International

Tournament information
- Location: Launceston, Tasmania, Australia
- Venue: Launceston Regional Tennis Centre
- Website: Official website
ATP Tour
- Category: ATP Challenger Tour (2015-2020)
- Draw: 32S/17Q/16D
- Prize money: $75,000
WTA Tour
- Category: ITF Women's Circuit
- Draw: 32S/32Q/16D
- Prize money: $35,000

The Launceston Tennis International is a professional tennis tournament played on outdoor hardcourts. It is part of the ITF Women's Circuit and has been held in Launceston, Australia, since 2012. In 2014, it was upgraded to a $50k event. In 2018, it returned to a $25k category event, before upgrading to a $60k event in 2019. Starting in 2015, the tournament added an ATP Challenger event which was held until 2020.

== Past finals ==
=== Men's singles ===
Year	Champion	Runner-up	Score
2015	(United States) Bjorn Fratangelo	(South Korea) Chung Hyeon	4–6, 6–2, 7–5
2016	(Australia) Blake Mott	(Kazakhstan) Andrey Golubev	6–7^{(4–7)}, 6–1, 6–2
2017	(United States) Noah Rubin	(United States) Mitchell Krueger	6–0, 6–1
2018	(Australia) Marc Polmans	(Australia) Bradley Mousley	6–2, 6–2
2019	(South Africa) Lloyd Harris	(Italy) Lorenzo Giustino	6–2, 6–2
2020	(Egypt) Mohamed Safwat	(Australia) Alex Bolt	7–6^{(7–5)}, 6–1

=== Men's doubles ===
Year	Champions	Runners-up	Score
2015	(Moldova) Radu Albot (United States) Mitchell Krueger	(Australia) Adam Hubble (New Zealand) Jose Rubin Statham	3–6, 7–5, [11–9]
2016	(Australia) Luke Saville (Australia) Jordan Thompson	(Australia) Dayne Kelly (Australia) Matt Reid	1–6, 6–4, [13–11]
2017	(Australia) Bradley Mousley (Australia) Luke Saville (2)	(Australia) Alex Bolt (Australia) Andrew Whittington	6–2, 6–1
2018	(Australia) Alex Bolt (Australia) Bradley Mousley	(United States) Sekou Bangoura (United States) Nathan Pasha	7–6^{(8–6)}, 6–0
2019	(Australia) Max Purcell (Australia) Luke Saville	(Japan) Hiroki Moriya (Egypt) Mohamed Safwat	7–5, 6–4
2020	(United States) Evan King (Zimbabwe) Benjamin Lock	(Belgium) Kimmer Coppejans (Spain) Sergio Martos Gornés	3–6, 6–3, [10–8]

=== Women's singles ===
Year	Champion	Runner-up	Score
2012	(Russia) Yulia Putintseva	(Netherlands) Lesley Kerkhove	6–1, 6–3
2013	(Australia) Storm Sanders	(Japan) Shuko Aoyama	6–4, 6–4
2014	(Australia) Olivia Rogowska	(France) Irena Pavlovic	5–7, 6–4, 6–0
2015	(Russia) Daria Gavrilova	(Croatia) Tereza Mrdeža	6–1, 6–2
2016	(China) Han Xinyun	(Russia) Alla Kudryavtseva	6–1, 6–1
2017	(United States) Jamie Loeb	(Slovenia) Tamara Zidanšek	7–6^{(7–4)}, 6–3
2018	(United Kingdom) Gabriella Taylor	(United States) Asia Muhammad	6–3, 6–4
2019	(Kazakhstan) Elena Rybakina	(Russia) Irina Khromacheva	7–5, 3–3 ret.
2020	(United States) Asia Muhammad	(Australia) Destanee Aiava	6–4, 6–3
2021–2024	Not held		
2025	(Australia) Lizette Cabrera	(Japan) Sakura Hosogi	7–5, 6–2
2026	(Australia) Lizette Cabrera	(China) Yuan Chengyiyi	3–6, 7–6^{(8–6)}, 6–2

=== Women's doubles ===
Year	Champions	Runners-up	Score
2012	(Japan) Shuko Aoyama (Japan) Kotomi Takahata	(Chinese Taipei) Hsieh Shu-ying (China) Zheng Saisai	6–4, 6–4
2013	(Russia) Ksenia Lykina (United Kingdom) Emily Webley-Smith	(United States) Allie Kiick (Canada) Erin Routliffe	7–5, 6–3
2014	(Australia) Monique Adamczak (Australia) Olivia Rogowska	(Thailand) Kamonwan Buayam (Slovakia) Zuzana Zlochová	6–2, 6–4
2015	(China) Han Xinyun (Japan) Junri Namigata	(China) Wang Yafan (China) Yang Zhaoxuan	6–4, 3–6, [10–6]
2016	(China) You Xiaodi (China) Zhu Lin	(Ukraine) Nadiia Kichenok (Luxembourg) Mandy Minella	2–6, 7–5, [10–7]
2017	(Australia) Monique Adamczak (2) (United States) Nicole Melichar	(Italy) Georgia Brescia (Slovenia) Tamara Zidanšek	6–1, 6–2
2018	(Australia) Jessica Moore (Australia) Ellen Perez	(United Kingdom) Laura Robson (Russia) Valeria Savinykh	7–6^{(7–5)}, 6–4
2019	(Chinese Taipei) Chang Kai-chen (Chinese Taipei) Hsu Ching-wen	(Australia) Alexandra Bozovic (Australia) Isabelle Wallace	6–2, 6–4
2020	(Australia) Alison Bai (Australia) Jaimee Fourlis	(Australia) Alicia Smith (Papua New Guinea) Abigail Tere-Apisah	7–6^{(7–4)}, 6–3
2021–2024	Not held		
2025	(New Zealand) Monique Barry (Australia) Elena Micic	(Japan) Miho Kuramochi (Japan) Erika Sema	6–2, 6–4
2026	(Japan) Kyōka Okamura (Japan) Naho Sato	(Australia) Gabriella Da Silva-Fick (Australia) Tenika McGiffin	5–7, 7–5, [14–12]
