= 2018 Launceston Tennis International =

- Date: 5–11 February
- Edition: 4th (men); 7th (women)
- Category: ATP Challenger Tour (men); ITF Women's Circuit (women)
- Prize money: $75,000 / $25,000
- Surface: Hard
- Location: Launceston, Australia
- Venue: Launceston Regional Tennis Centre

Champions

Men's singles
- (Australia) Marc Polmans

Women's singles
- (United Kingdom) Gabriella Taylor

Men's doubles
- (Australia) Alex Bolt / (Australia) Bradley Mousley

Women's doubles
- (Australia) Jessica Moore / (Australia) Ellen Perez
- Launceston International

The 2018 Smart Fibre Launceston International is a professional tennis tournament played on outdoor hard courts as part of the 2018 ATP Challenger Tour and the 2018 ITF Women's Circuit, offering a total of $75,000 in prize money for men and $25,000 for women. It was the fourth (for men) and seventh (for women) edition of the tournament.

== Men's singles entrants ==
=== Seeds ===
Country	Player	Rank^{1}	Seed
ESP	Marcel Granollers	138	1
JPN	Yoshihito Nishioka	170	2
USA	Kevin King	189	3
USA	Evan King	202	4
FRA	Stéphane Robert	210	5
AUS	Alex Bolt	223	6
AUS	Jason Kubler	239	7
USA	Christian Harrison	242	8

- ^{1} Rankings as of 29 January 2018.

=== Other entrants ===
The following players received wildcards into the singles main draw:

- (Australia) Alex Bolt
- (Australia) Harry Bourchier
- (Australia) Andrew Harris
- (Australia) Luke Saville

The following players received entry from the qualifying draw:

- (United States) Nathaniel Lammons
- (Australia) Marinko Matosevic
- (France) Gianni Mina
- (Australia) Benjamin Mitchell

The following player received entry as a lucky loser:

- (Monaco) Lucas Catarina

== Women's singles entrants ==
=== Seeds ===
Country	Player	Rank^{1}	Seed
SUI	Patty Schnyder	150	1
RUS	Irina Khromacheva	190	2
AUS	Priscilla Hon	194	3
USA	Asia Muhammad	207	4
FRA	Myrtille Georges	217	5
CRO	Tereza Mrdeža	221	6
ROU	Jaqueline Cristian	223	7
GBR	Laura Robson	237	8

- ^{1} Rankings as of 29 January 2018

=== Other entrants ===
The following players received wildcards into the singles main draw:

- (Australia) Kimberly Birrell
- (Australia) Renee McBryde
- (Australia) Kaylah McPhee
- (Australia) Alana Parnaby

The following players received entry from the qualifying draw:

- (Japan) Shuko Aoyama
- (Australia) Alexandra Bozovic
- (United States) Allie Kiick
- (Japan) Chihiro Muramatsu
- (Japan) Himari Satō
- (Japan) Riko Sawayanagi
- (Japan) Yuuki Tanaka
- (Australia) Olivia Tjandramulia

== Champions ==
=== Men's singles ===
- (Australia) Marc Polmans def. (Australia) Bradley Mousley 6–2, 6–2.

=== Women's singles ===
- (United Kingdom) Gabriella Taylor def. (United States) Asia Muhammad, 6–3, 6–4

=== Men's doubles ===
- (Australia) Alex Bolt / (Australia) Bradley Mousley def. (United States) Sekou Bangoura / (United States) Nathan Pasha 7–6^{(8–6)}, 6–0.

=== Women's doubles ===
- (Australia) Jessica Moore / (Australia) Ellen Perez def. (United Kingdom) Laura Robson / (Russia) Valeria Savinykh, 7–6^{(7–5)}, 6–4
