= Hsu Ching-wen =

Taiwanese tennis player (born 1996)

Hsu Ching-wen 徐竫雯
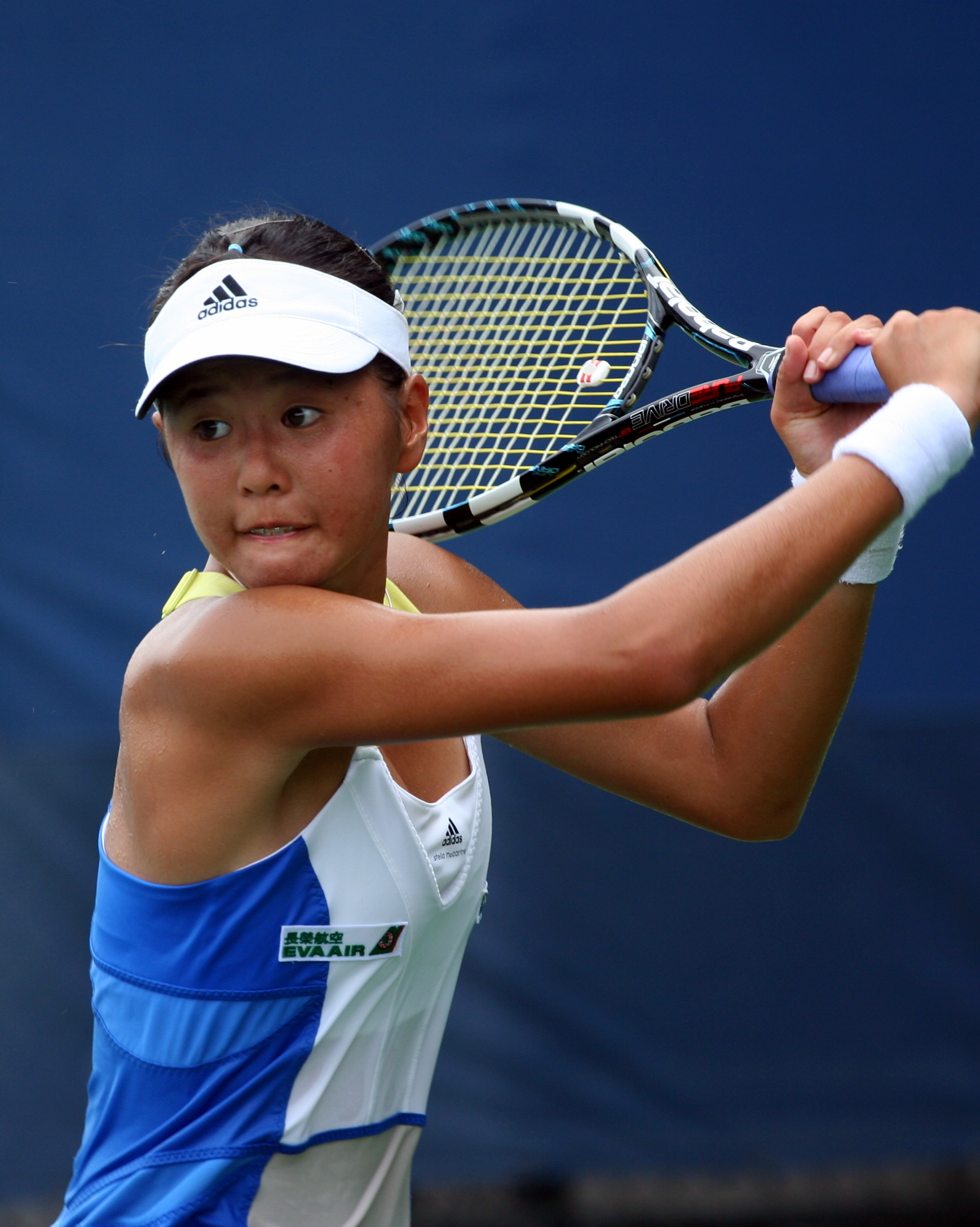
- Hsu at the 2013 US Open
- Country (sports): Chinese Taipei
- Born: 19 August 1996 (age 28); Kaohsiung, Taiwan
- Plays: Right (two-handed backhand)
- Prize money: $96,266

Singles
- Career record: 163–148
- Career titles: 5 ITF
- Highest ranking: No. 317 (21 March 2016)

Grand Slam singles results
- Australian Open Junior: 3R (2013)
- French Open Junior: 1R (2013)
- Wimbledon Junior: 2R (2013)
- US Open Junior: 2R (2012)

Doubles
- Career record: 168–106
- Career titles: 12 ITF
- Highest ranking: No. 163 (9 January 2017)

Grand Slam doubles results
- Australian Open Junior: 2R (2013)
- French Open Junior: 2R (2013)
- Wimbledon Junior: 2R (2013)
- US Open Junior: 2R (2013)

Team competitions
- Fed Cup: 3–5

Hsu Ching-wen (Chinese: 徐竫雯; pinyin: Xú Jìng-wén; born 19 August 1996) is a Taiwanese former professional tennis player.

Hsu won five singles and twelve doubles titles on the ITF Women's Circuit. On 21 March 2016, she reached her best singles ranking of world No. 317. On 9 January 2017, she peaked at No. 163 in the WTA doubles rankings. In November 2019, she played her last professional tournament at the Taipei Challenger.

Playing for Chinese Taipei Fed Cup team, Hsu has a win–loss record of 3–5.

== ITF Circuit finals ==
=== Singles: 9 (5 titles, 4 runner–ups) ===
Legend $25,000 tournaments $10/15,000 tournaments	Finals by surface Hard (4–4) Clay (1–0)

Result	W–L	Date	Tournament	Tier	Surface	Opponent	Score
Loss	0–1	Dec 2012	ITF Jakarta, Indonesia	10,000	Hard	(Chinese Taipei) Juan Ting-fei	3–6, 2–6
Loss	0–2	Nov 2013	ITF Mumbai, India	15,000	Hard	(India) Prarthana Thombare	3–6, 7–6^{(10)}, 4–6
Win	1–2	Jan 2014	ITF Saint Martin, Guadeloupe	10,000	Hard	(Canada) Sonja Molnar	4–6, 6–4, 6–0
Win	2–2	Aug 2014	ITF Bangalore, India	10,000	Hard	(Oman) Fatma Al-Nabhani	6–4, 6–4
Win	3–2	Mar 2015	ITF Nishitama, Japan	10,000	Hard	(Japan) Kyōka Okamura	6–3, 3–6, 6–4
Win	4–2	Apr 2015	ITF Dehradun, India	10,000	Hard	(Thailand) Nungnadda Wannasuk	7–6^{(4)}, 6–4
Win	5–2	May 2015	ITF Nashik, India	10,000	Clay	(India) Sri Peddi Reddy	6–4, 4–6, 7–6^{(5)}
Loss	5–3	Jun 2015	ITF Kaohsiung, Taiwan	10,000	Hard	(Chinese Taipei) Lee Ya-hsuan	4–6, 6–2, 3–6
Loss	5–4	Mar 2016	ITF Nanjing, China	10,000	Hard	(Russia) Anastasia Gasanova	1–6, 1–6

=== Doubles: 24 (12 titles, 12 runner–ups) ===
Legend $50/60,000 tournaments $25,000 tournaments $10/15,000 tournaments	Finals by surface Hard (10–10) Clay (1–2) Grass (1–0)

Result	W–L	Date	Tournament	Tier	Surface	Partner	Opponents	Score
Loss	0–1	Jun 2012	ITF Taipei, Taiwan	10,000	Hard (i)	(Chinese Taipei) Lee Ya-hsuan	(Chinese Taipei) Kao Shao-yuan (Chinese Taipei) Lee Hua-chen	3–6, 3–6
Loss	0–2	Nov 2013	ITF Mumbai, India	15,000	Hard	(United Kingdom) Eden Silva	(United States) Anamika Bhargava (United Kingdom) Emily Webley-Smith	4–6, 5–7
Win	1–2	Jan 2014	ITF Petit-Bourg, Guadeloupe	10,000	Hard	(Canada) Wendy Zhang	(France) Audrey Albié (France) Manon Peral	7–5, 6–0
Loss	1–3	Aug 2014	ITF Bangalore, India	10,000	Hard	(India) Natasha Palha	(India) Sharmada Balu (India) Prarthana Thombare	4–6, 6–0, [6–10]
Loss	1–4	Feb 2015	ITF New Delhi, India	25,000	Hard	(Chinese Taipei) Lee Pei-chi	(China) Tang Haochen (China) Yang Zhaoxuan	5–7, 1–6
Loss	1–5	Feb 2015	ITF Aurangabad, India	25,000	Clay	(Chinese Taipei) Lee Pei-chi	(Chinese Taipei) Lee Ya-hsuan (Thailand) Varatchaya Wongteanchai	1–6, 6–7^{(4)}
Win	2–5	Mar 2015	ITF Jiangmen, China	10,000	Hard	(China) Tang Haochen	(China) Jiang Xinyu (China) Tang Qianhui	6–4, 6–3
Loss	2–6	May 2015	ITF Bhopal, India	10,000	Hard	(India) Sharmada Balu	(India) Snehadevi Reddy (India) Dhruthi Tatachar Venugopal	6–0, 6–7^{(1)}, [3–10]
Win	3–6	May 2015	ITF Bangkok, Thailand	10,000	Hard	(Thailand) Nungnadda Wannasuk	(Thailand) Kamonwan Buayam (South Korea) Kim Da-bin	4–6, 7–6^{(4)}, [10–3]
Loss	3–7	Sep 2015	ITF Kyoto, Japan	10,000	Hard (i)	(Chinese Taipei) Lee Pei-chi	(Japan) Akari Inoue (Japan) Miki Miyamura	3–6, 0–6
Loss	3–8	Oct 2015	ITF Bangkok, Thailand	15,000	Hard	(Finland) Emma Laine	(South Korea) Choi Ji-hee (Thailand) Peangtarn Plipuech	5–7, 3–6
Loss	3–9	Jan 2016	ITF Hong Kong	25,000	Hard	(Finland) Emma Laine	(Switzerland) Viktorija Golubic (Liechtenstein) Stephanie Vogt	2–6, 6–1, [4–10]
Win	4–9	Feb 2016	ITF New Delhi, India	25,000	Hard	(Chinese Taipei) Lee Ya-hsuan	(Russia) Natela Dzalamidze (Russia) Veronika Kudermetova	6–0, 0–6, [10–6]
Win	5–9	May 2016	Kurume Cup, Japan	50,000	Grass	(Russia) Ksenia Lykina	(Hungary) Dalma Gálfi (China) Xu Shilin	7–6^{(5)}, 6–2
Win	6–9	Dec 2017	ITF Indore, India	15,000	Hard	(Bosnia and Herzegovina) Dea Herdželaš	(Uzbekistan) Albina Khabibulina (Kyrgyzstan) Ksenia Palkina	6–2, 6–1
Win	7–9	Dec 2017	ITF Solapur, India	15,000	Hard	(India) Pranjala Yadlapalli	(United States) Maya Jansen (New Zealand) Erin Routliffe	7–5, 1–6, [10–6]
Win	8–9	Jan 2018	ITF Orlando, United States	25,000	Clay	(China) Guo Hanyu	(Norway) Ulrikke Eikeri (Belarus) Ilona Kremen	6–3, 3–6, [12–10]
Loss	8–10	Jan 2018	ITF Wesley Chapel, U.S.	25,000	Clay	(China) Zheng Wushuang	(Norway) Ulrikke Eikeri (Belarus) Ilona Kremen	2–6, 3–6
Loss	8–11	May 2018	ITF Incheon, Korea	25,000	Hard	(Chinese Taipei) Chang Kai-chen	(South Korea) Han Na-lae (South Korea) Kim Na-ri	0–5 ret.
Win	9–11	Jun 2018	ITF Daegu, Korea	25,000	Hard	(Chinese Taipei) Chang Kai-chen	(Japan) Shiho Akita (Japan) Misaki Doi	2–1 ret.
Win	10–11	Feb 2019	Launceston International, Australia	60,000	Hard	(Chinese Taipei) Chang Kai-chen	(Australia) Alexandra Bozovic (Australia) Isabelle Wallace	6–2, 6–4
Win	11–11	Mar 2019	ITF Kofu, Japan	25,000	Hard	(Chinese Taipei) Chang Kai-chen	(United States) Emina Bektas (United Kingdom) Tara Moore	6–1, 6–3
Win	12–11	Mar 2019	Kofu International Open, Japan	25,000	Hard	(Chinese Taipei) Chang Kai-chen	(China) Xun Fangying (China) You Xiaodi	6–3, 6–4
Loss	12–12	Apr 2019	ITF Osaka, Japan	25,000	Hard	(China) Wang Xiyu	(South Korea) Choi Ji-hee (South Korea) Han Na-lae	4–6, 7–5, [8–10]
