= Isabelle Wallace =

Scottish-Australian tennis player

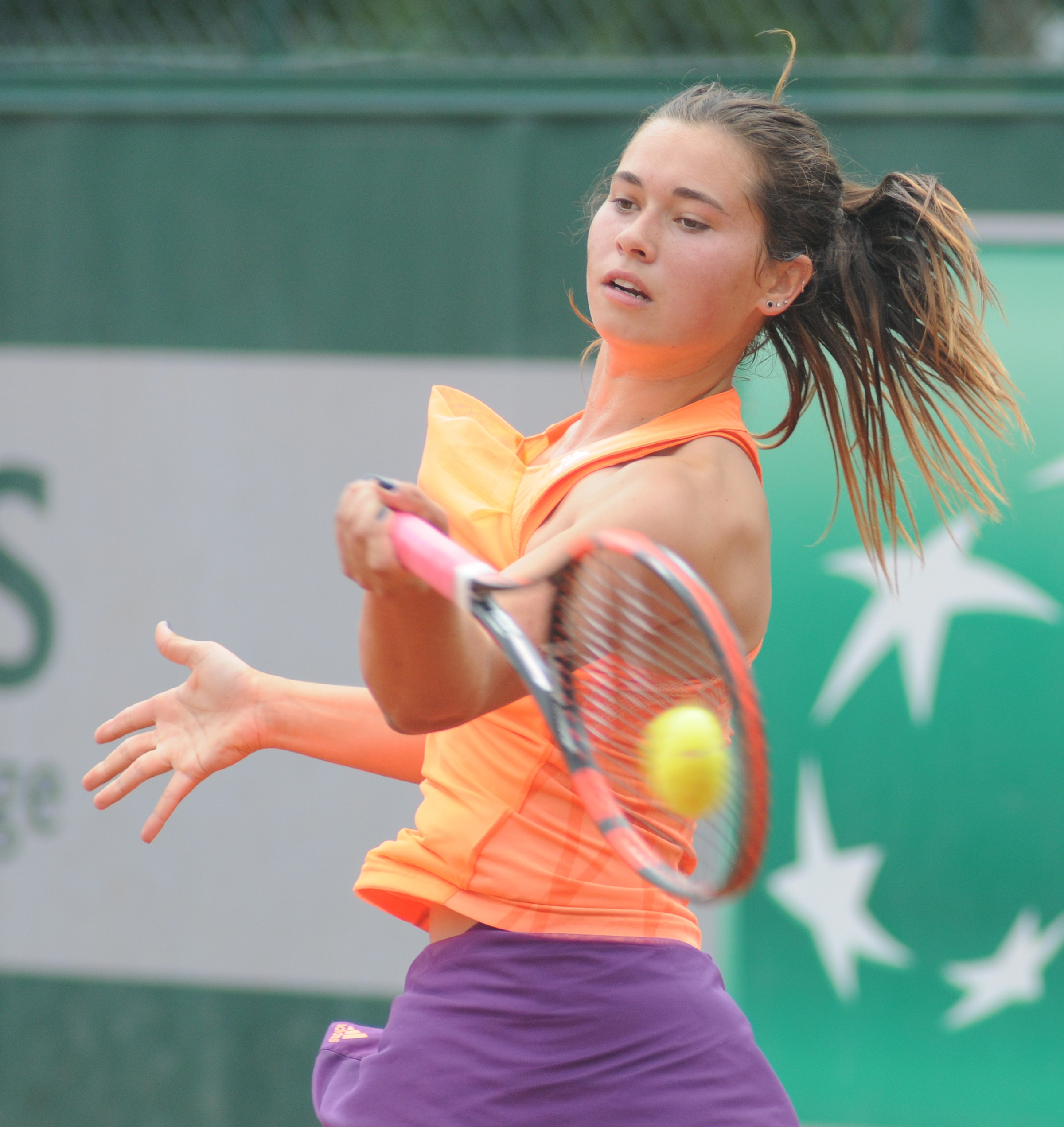
- Country (sports): Australia (2011–13; 2015–); Great Britain (2013–15)
- Residence: Valencia, Spain
- Born: 7 September 1996 (age 29) Inverness, Great Britain
- Prize money: $153,180

Singles
- Career record: 139–111
- Career titles: 6 ITF
- Highest ranking: No. 243 (15 January 2018)

Grand Slam singles results
- Australian Open: Q2 (2019)
- French Open: 1R (2018)

Doubles
- Career record: 75–65
- Career titles: 2 ITF
- Highest ranking: No. 326 (6 November 2017)

Grand Slam doubles results
- Australian Open: 1R (2018, 2019)

Isabelle Wallace (born 7 September 1996) is a Scottish-Australian former tennis player.

She made her WTA Tour main-draw debut at the 2018 Australian Open, after being awarded a wildcard into the women's doubles with Naiktha Bains.

Wallace has career-high WTA rankings of No. 243 in singles, achieved on 15 January 2018, and 326 in doubles, set in November 2017. She won six singles and two doubles titles on the ITF Circuit.

== Early life ==
She was born and raised in Inverness, Scotland before moving to Melbourne, Australia when she was ten and representing Australia at international tournaments. After six years, Wallace and her family moved back to Scotland where she then chose to represent Great Britain. In 2015, Wallace made the decision to represent Australia again in international sporting competitions due to lack of support from the Lawn Tennis Association.

== Junior career ==
As a junior, Wallace had a career-high ranking of No. 37, achieved in January 2014. Her junior highlights include reaching the third round of the girls' singles at the Australian Open and the French Open in 2014.

== ITF Circuit finals ==
=== Singles: 8 (6 titles, 2 runner–ups) ===
Legend $25,000 tournaments $10/15,000 tournaments	Finals by surface Clay (6–2)

Result	W–L	Date	Tournament	Tier	Surface	Opponent	Score
Loss	0–1	Nov 2015	ITF Castellón, Spain	10,000	Clay	(Spain) Irene Burillo Escorihuela	2–6, 2–6
Loss	0–2	Feb 2016	ITF Palma Nova, Spain	10,000	Clay	(Spain) Olga Sáez Larra	2–6, 4–6
Win	1–2	Dec 2016	ITF Castellón, Spain	10,000	Clay	(Venezuela) Andrea Gámiz	6–2, 6–1
Win	2–2	Feb 2017	ITF Manacor, Spain	15,000	Clay	(Spain) María Teresa Torró Flor	6–3, 7–6^{(5)}
Win	3–2	Mar 2017	ITF Palma Nova, Spain	15,000	Clay	(Germany) Katharina Hobgarski	7–6^{(4)}, 6–0
Win	4–2	Aug 2017	ITF Koksijde, Belgium	25,000	Clay	(Netherlands) Bibiane Schoofs	4–6, 6–4, 6–3
Win	5–2	Oct 2017	ITF Riba-roja de Túria, Spain	15,000	Clay	(Switzerland) Rebeka Masarova	6–3, 6–3
Win	6–2	Dec 2017	ITF Nules, Spain	25,000	Clay	(France) Tessah Andrianjafitrimo	6–1, 4–6, 6–3

=== Doubles: 10 (2 titles, 8 runner–ups) ===
Legend $80,000 tournaments $60,000 tournaments $10/15,000 tournaments	Finals by surface Hard (1–1) Clay (1–7)

Result	W–L	Date	Tournament	Tier	Surface	Partner	Opponents	Score
Loss	0–1	Sep 2015	ITF Madrid, Spain	10,000	Clay	(Italy) Deborah Chiesa	(Spain) Estrella Cabeza Candela (Spain) Cristina Sánchez Quintanar	6–7^{(4)}, 5–7
Loss	0–2	Oct 2015	ITF Melilla, Spain	10,000	Clay	(Spain) Irene Burillo Escorihuela	(Spain) Estrella Cabeza Candela (Ukraine) Oleksandra Korashvili	3–6, 1–6
Win	1–2	Mar 2016	ITF Hammamet, Tunisia	10,000	Clay	(Austria) Julia Grabher	(Italy) Claudia Giovine (India) Snehadevi Reddy	6–1, 6–3
Win	2–2	Aug 2016	ITF Valladolid, Spain	10,000	Hard	(Spain) Ángela Fita Boluda	(Spain) Arabela Fernández Rabener (Spain) Ana Román Domínguez	6–1, 6–1
Loss	2–3	Nov 2016	ITF Benicarló, Spain	10,000	Clay	(Ukraine) Oleksandra Korashvili	(United Kingdom) Amanda Carreras (Ecuador) Charlotte Römer	7–5, 3–6, [7–10]
Loss	2–4	Dec 2016	ITF Castellón, Spain	10,000	Clay	(Spain) Arabela Fernández Rabener	(Brazil) Laura Pigossi (France) Jessika Ponchet	1–6, 3–6
Loss	2–5	Mar 2017	ITF Palma Nova, Spain	15,000	Clay	(Portugal) Inês Murta	(Spain) Irene Burillo Escorihuela (Russia) Ksenija Sharifova	5–7, 3–6
Loss	2–6	Apr 2017	ITF Hammamet, Tunisia	15,000	Clay	(Ecuador) Charlotte Römer	(Spain) Irene Burillo Escorihuela (Spain) Yvonne Cavallé Reimers	4–6, 3–6
Loss	2–7	Sep 2017	Open de Biarritz, France	80,000	Clay	(Spain) Cristina Bucșa	(Romania) Irina Bara (Romania) Mihaela Buzărnescu	3–6, 1–6
Loss	2–8	Feb 2019	Launceston International, Australia	60,000	Hard	(Australia) Alexandra Bozovic	(Chinese Taipei) Chang Kai-chen (Chinese Taipei) Hsu Ching-wen	2–6, 4–6
