= 2020 Launceston International =

- Date: 3–9 February 2020
- Edition: 6th (men); 9th (women)
- Category: ATP Challenger Tour; ITF Women's World Tennis Tour
- Prize money: $54,160+H (men) $25,000 (women)
- Surface: Hard
- Location: Launceston, Tasmania, Australia

Champions

Men's singles
- (Egypt) Mohamed Safwat

Women's singles
- (United States) Asia Muhammad

Men's doubles
- (United States) Evan King / (Zimbabwe) Benjamin Lock

Women's doubles
- (Australia) Alison Bai / (Australia) Jaimee Fourlis
← 2019 ·	Launceston International	· 2021 →

The 2020 Launceston International was a professional tennis tournament played on hard courts. It was the sixth (men) and ninth (women) editions of the tournament which was part of the 2020 ATP Challenger Tour and the 2020 ITF Women's World Tennis Tour. It took place in Launceston, Tasmania, Australia between 3 and 9 February 2020.

== Men's singles main-draw entrants ==
=== Seeds ===
Country	Player	Rank^{1}	Seed
AUS	Marc Polmans	133	1
AUS	Alex Bolt	140	2
JPN	Tatsuma Ito	146	3
ITA	Lorenzo Giustino	150	4
GBR	Jay Clarke	155	5
BEL	Kimmer Coppejans	158	6
~~AUS~~	~~Andrew Harris~~	~~162~~	~~7~~
GER	Yannick Hanfmann	167	8
EGY	Mohamed Safwat	173	9
AUS	Max Purcell	216	10
TPE	Wu Tung-lin	232	11
KOR	Lee Duck-hee	236	12
GBR	Liam Broady	237	13
GER	Julian Lenz	239	14
CRO	Viktor Galović	249	15
AUS	Akira Santillan	252	16

- ^{1} Rankings are as of 20 January 2020.

=== Other entrants ===
The following players received wildcards into the singles main draw:

- (Australia) Alexander Crnokrak
- (Australia) Blake Ellis
- (Australia) Matthew Romios
- (Australia) Tristan Schoolkate
- (Australia) Dane Sweeny

The following player received entry into the singles main draw using a protected ranking:

- (Australia) Jeremy Beale

The following players received entry from the qualifying draw:

- (Canada) Steven Diez
- (Japan) Naoki Tajima

The following players received entry as lucky losers:

- (Australia) Calum Puttergill
- (Japan) Ryota Tanuma

== Women's singles main-draw entrants ==
=== Seeds ===
Country	Player	Rank^{1}	Seed
ESP	Paula Badosa	97	1
USA	Sachia Vickery	150	2
USA	Asia Muhammad	216	3
AUS	Jaimee Fourlis	256	4
AUS	Destanee Aiava	266	5
JPN	Ayano Shimizu	286	6
AUS	Belinda Woolcock	295	7
AUS	Abbie Myers	325	8

- ^{1} Rankings are as of 20 January 2020.

=== Other entrants ===
The following players received wildcards into the singles main draw:

- (Australia) Laura Ashley
- (Australia) Amber Marshall

The following players received entry from the qualifying draw:

- (Australia) Zara Brankovic
- (South Korea) Park So-hyun
- (Italy) Lisa Pigato
- (Japan) Himari Sato
- (Australia) Olivia Symons
- (China) Tian Fangran

== Champions ==
=== Men's singles ===
- (Egypt) Mohamed Safwat def. (Australia) Alex Bolt 7–6^{(7–5)}, 6–1.

=== Women's singles ===
- (United States) Asia Muhammad def. (Australia) Destanee Aiava, 6–4, 6–3

=== Men's doubles ===
- (United States) Evan King / (Zimbabwe) Benjamin Lock def. (Belgium) Kimmer Coppejans / (Spain) Sergio Martos Gornés 3–6, 6–3, [10–8].

=== Women's doubles ===
- (Australia) Alison Bai / (Australia) Jaimee Fourlis def. (Australia) Alicia Smith / (Papua New Guinea) Abigail Tere-Apisah, 7–6^{(7–4)}, 6–3
