= Mohamed Safwat =

Egyptian tennis player

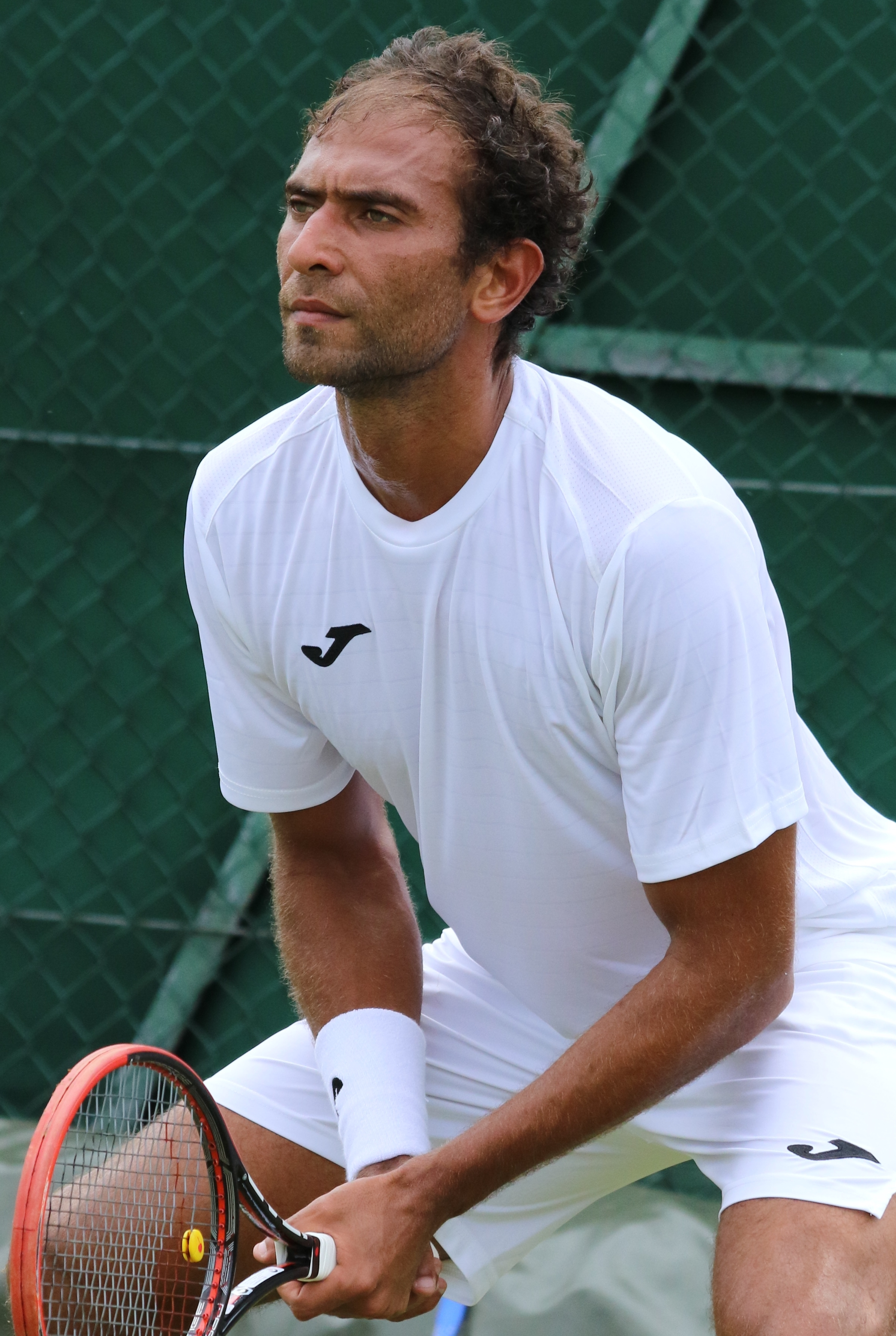
- Country (sports): Egypt
- Residence: Cairo, Egypt
- Born: 19 September 1990 (age 35) Mansoura, Egypt
- Height: 1.80 m (5 ft 11 in)
- Turned pro: 2008
- Retired: 14 April 2026
- Plays: Right-handed (Two-handed backhand)
- Prize money: $ 905,772

Singles
- Career record: 17–27
- Career titles: 0
- Highest ranking: No. 130 (10 February 2020)
- Current ranking: No. 814 (10 November 2025)

Grand Slam singles results
- Australian Open: 1R (2020)
- French Open: 1R (2018)
- Wimbledon: Q3 (2016)
- US Open: 1R (2020)

Other tournaments
- Olympic Games: 1R (2021)

Doubles
- Career record: 4–10
- Career titles: 0
- Highest ranking: No. 225 (26 September 2016)

Team competitions
- Davis Cup: 32–18
- Last updated on: 15 November 2025.

Mohamed Safwat (Arabic: محمد صفوت; born 19 September 1990) is a former Egyptian tennis player. Safwat had been a regular player on the Egypt Davis Cup team from 2009 until 2026. Safwat has won one singles and three titles in doubles on the ATP Challenger Tour. He is currently the Egyptian No. 4.

== Professional career ==
In 2016, Safwat became the first Egyptian player since 1997 to reach the final of a Challenger tournament when he reached the final in Kenitra, where he lost to Maximilian Marterer in straight sets. He also reached the semifinals at the Challenger tournament in Launceston in 2017, eventually losing to Mitchell Krueger.

In 2018, Safwat beat No. 3 seed and top 100 player Jordan Thompson en route to his second Challenger singles final in Anning, where he lost to Prajnesh Gunneswaran.

Safwat qualified for his first Grand Slam at the 2018 French Open as a lucky loser, where he lost to Grigor Dimitrov in straight sets. He was the first man from Egypt to play in a Grand Slam tennis tournament's main singles draw in 22 years.

In January 2020, Safwat qualified for a Grand Slam main draw for the first time in his career at the 2020 Australian Open by defeating three opponents in the qualifications at Melbourne Park. It made him the first Egyptian since Ismail El Shafei in 1978 to feature in an Australian Open main draw.

In February 2020, Safwat won his first singles Challenger title at the Launceston International beating local Alex Bolt in the final, thereby becoming the first Egyptian to win a Challenger title in singles since Tamer El-Sawy in 1996 and took him to a career-high of World No. 130 in the ATP rankings on 10 February 2020.

== National representation ==
In 2018, Safwat was part of the Egyptian Davis Cup team to advance to the 3rd round of the Europe/Africa Zone II bracket for the first time since 1996.

Safwat made history for Egyptian sport at the Tokyo Olympic Games, where he made his debut, as the first Egyptian man to qualify for the Olympics in 2021 after he won the 2019 African Games.

== ATP Challenger and ITF Futures finals ==
=== Singles: 57 (31–26) ===
Legend (singles) ATP Challenger Tour (1–3) ITF Futures Tour (30–23)	Titles by surface Hard (16–14) Clay (15–12)

Result	W–L	Date	Tournament	Tier	Surface	Opponent	Score
Win	1–0	Aug 2010	Thailand F1, Nonthaburi	Futures	Hard	(France) Simon Cauvard	7–6^{(7–5)}, 6–3
Loss	1–1	Aug 2011	Kazakhstan F5, Astana	Futures	Hard	(India) Karan Rastogi	2–6, 1–6
Win	2–1	Nov 2011	Rwanda F1, Kigali	Futures	Clay	(Egypt) Karim-Mohamed Maamoun	6–3, 6–2
Loss	2–2	Jun 2012	Spain F17, Melilla	Futures	Hard	(Republic of Ireland) James McGee	3–6, 5–7
Loss	2–3	Sep 2012	Turkey F34, Antalya	Futures	Hard	(Australia) Brydan Klein	6–2, 6–7^{(7–9)}, 1–6
Win	3–3	Apr 2013	Egypt F3, Sharm El Sheikh	Futures	Clay	(Russia) Ivan Nedelko	6–4, 6–2
Win	4–3	Apr 2013	Egypt F4, Sharm El Sheikh	Futures	Clay	(Italy) Gianluigi Quinzi	6–2, 1–6, 6–3
Loss	4–4	Jun 2013	Egypt F9, Sharm El Sheikh	Futures	Clay	(Egypt) Karim Hossam	4–6, 5–7
Win	5–4	Jun 2013	Egypt F10, Sharm El Sheikh	Futures	Clay	(Austria) Marc Rath	6–2, 6–7^{(3–7)}, 6–3
Win	6–4	Jul 2013	Egypt F14, Sharm El Sheikh	Futures	Clay	(Italy) Omar Giacalone	6–2, 6–3
Win	7–4	Aug 2013	Egypt F21, Sharm El Sheikh	Futures	Clay	(Egypt) Karim-Mohamed Maamoun	6–4, 6–3
Win	8–4	Sep 2013	Egypt F22, Sharm El Sheikh	Futures	Clay	(Egypt) Mazen Osama	6–2, 4–6, 6–3
Win	9–4	Oct 2013	Egypt F29, Sharm El Sheikh	Futures	Clay	(Morocco) Hicham Khaddari	6–4, 6–2
Win	10–4	Nov 2013	Egypt F32, Sharm El Sheikh	Futures	Clay	(France) Axel Michon	6–3, 7–5
Win	11–4	Dec 2013	Egypt F35, Sharm El Sheikh	Futures	Clay	(Serbia) Peđa Krstin	6–4, 7–6^{(7–1)}
Win	12–4	Mar 2014	Egypt F9, Sharm El Sheikh	Futures	Clay	(Egypt) Sherif Sabry	6–3, 6–3
Loss	12–5	Mar 2014	Egypt F10, Sharm El Sheikh	Futures	Clay	(Czech Republic) Jaroslav Pospíšil	1–6, 2–6
Loss	12–6	Jun 2014	Egypt F20, Sharm El Sheikh	Futures	Clay	(Spain) Marc Giner	4–6, 6–2, 2–6
Loss	12–7	Oct 2014	Egypt F29, Sharm El Sheikh	Futures	Hard	(Netherlands) Matwé Middelkoop	5–7, 6–2, 3–6
Win	13–7	Nov 2014	Turkey F38, Antalya	Futures	Hard	(Germany) Marc Sieber	7–5, 3–6, 6–4
Win	14–7	Nov 2014	Egypt F33, Sharm El Sheikh	Futures	Hard	(France) Tom Jomby	6–4, 6–4
Win	15–7	Nov 2014	Egypt F34, Sharm El Sheikh	Futures	Hard	(Czech Republic) Jaroslav Pospíšil	5–7, 6–3, 6–2
Win	16–7	Jan 2015	Egypt F2, Cairo	Futures	Clay	(Poland) Kamil Majchrzak	7–5, 6–3
Loss	16–8	Mar 2015	Egypt F9, Sharm El Sheikh	Futures	Hard	(Czech Republic) Jan Šátral	3–6, 4–6
Win	17–8	Mar 2015	Egypt F10, Sharm El Sheikh	Futures	Hard	(Czech Republic) Jaroslav Pospíšil	6–3, 6–7^{(2–7)}, 5–0 ret.
Loss	17–9	Mar 2015	Egypt F11, Sharm El Sheikh	Futures	Hard	(Czech Republic) Jaroslav Pospíšil	7–6^{(8–6)}, 3–6, 6–7^{(5–7)}
Loss	17–10	Apr 2015	Egypt F15, Sharm El Sheikh	Futures	Hard	(Austria) Dennis Novak	2–6, 6–7^{(4–7)}
Loss	17–11	May 2015	Egypt F16, Sharm El Sheikh	Futures	Hard	(Serbia) Marko Tepavac	4–6, 4–6
Win	18–11	Jun 2015	Egypt F22, Sharm El Sheikh	Futures	Hard	(Spain) David Pérez Sanz	6–2, 6–3
Loss	18–12	Jun 2015	Egypt F23, Sharm El Sheikh	Futures	Hard	(Spain) David Pérez Sanz	5–7, 6–3, 1–6
Loss	18–13	Sep 2015	Egypt F30, Cairo	Futures	Clay	(Austria) Bastian Trinker	6–7^{(5–7)}, 3–6
Win	19–13	Sep 2015	Egypt F31, Cairo	Futures	Clay	(Austria) Bastian Trinker	7–6^{(7–3)}, 6–0
Loss	19–14	Sep 2015	Egypt F32, Cairo	Futures	Clay	(France) Adrien Puget	6–7^{(1–7)}, 0–6
Win	20–14	Jan 2016	Egypt F1, Sharm El Sheikh	Futures	Hard	(Spain) Enrique López Pérez	6–3, 7–5
Win	20–14	Jan 2016	Egypt F2, Sharm El Sheikh	Futures	Hard	(Belgium) Julien Dubail	6–2, 6–1
Loss	20–15	Apr 2016	Egypt F12, Sharm El Sheikh	Futures	Hard	(Serbia) Marko Tepavac	6–7^{(5–7)}, 4–6
Loss	21–16	Apr 2016	Nigeria F1, Abuja	Futures	Hard	(Netherlands) Antal van der Duim	5–7, 3–6
Win	22–16	Apr 2016	Nigeria F2, Abuja	Futures	Hard	(Bosnia and Herzegovina) Aldin Šetkić	6–4, 4–2 ret.
Loss	22–17	May 2016	Nigeria F4, Abuja	Futures	Hard	(Spain) David Pérez Sanz	6–7^{(3–7)}, 4–6
Loss	22–18	Sep 2016	Kenitra, Morocco	Challenger	Clay	(Germany) Maximilian Marterer	2–6, 4–6
Win	23–18	Jul 2017	Egypt F20, Sharm El Sheikh	Futures	Hard	(Italy) Lorenzo Frigerio	6–4, 7–5
Win	24–18	Aug 2017	Italy F25, Cornaiano	Futures	Clay	(Bosnia and Herzegovina) Tomislav Brkić	6–4, 6–3
Loss	24–19	Apr 2018	Anning, China, P.R.	Challenger	Clay	(India) Prajnesh Gunneswaran	7–5, 3–6, 1–6
Loss	24–20	Nov 2019	Helsinki, Finland	Challenger	Hard (i)	(Finland) Emil Ruusuvuori	3–6, 7–6^{(7–4)}, 2–6
Win	25–20	Feb 2020	Launceston, Australia	Challenger	Hard	(Australia) Alex Bolt	7–6^{(7–5)}, 6–1
Loss	25–21	Aug 2022	M15 Cairo, Egypt	Futures	Clay	(Argentina) Alex Barrena	6–7^{(4–7)}, 1–6
Loss	25–22	Sep 2022	M15 Cairo, Egypt	Futures	Clay	(Argentina) Leonardo Aboian	6–7^{(4–7)}, 2–6
Loss	25–23	Mar 2023	M15 Sharm El Sheikh, Egypt	Futures	Hard	(Germany) Robert Strombachs	2–6, 3–6
Win	26–23	Apr 2023	M15 Sharm El Sheikh, Egypt	Futures	Hard	(Russia) Ilia Simakin	6–4, 6–0
Loss	26–24	May 2023	M15 Osijek, Croatia	Futures	Clay	(Austria) Neil Oberleitner	4–6, 3–6
Loss	26–25	Sep 2023	M25 Jablonec nad Nisou, Czech Republic	Futures	Clay	(Czech Republic) Martin Krumich	2–6, 0–6
Win	27–25	Oct 2023	M15 Sharm El Sheikh, Egypt	Futures	Hard	(United Kingdom) Stuart Parker	6–2, 3–6, 6–3
Win	28–25	Oct 2023	M15 Sharm El Sheikh, Egypt	Futures	Hard	(United Kingdom) Stuart Parker	7–5, 7–5
Win	29–25	Oct 2023	M15 Sharm El Sheikh, Egypt	World Tennis Tour	Hard	(Luxembourg) Alex Knaff	6–4, 6–4
Win	30–25	Apr 2024	M25 Sharm El Sheikh, Egypt	World Tennis Tour	Hard	(France) Robin Bertrand	3–6, 6–2, 6–2
Win	31–25	Nov 2024	M15 Sharm El Sheikh, Egypt	World Tennis Tour	Clay	(Serbia) Nikola Milojević	6–3, 6–2
Loss	31–26	Apr 2025	M15 Sharm El Sheikh, Egypt	World Tennis Tour	Hard	(Egypt) Fares Zakaria	5–7, 3–6

=== Doubles: 21 (13–8) ===
Legend (doubles) ATP Challenger Tour (3–1) ITF Futures Tour (10–7)	Titles by surface Hard (6–6) Clay (7–2)

Result	W–L	Date	Tournament	Tier	Surface	Partner	Opponents	Score
Loss	0–1	May 2011	Turkey F17, Adana	Futures	Clay	(Syria) Issam Haitham Taweel	(Republic of Ireland) Sam Barry (Republic of Ireland) Barry King	2–6, 2–6
Loss	0–2	Nov 2011	Rwanda F2, Kigali	Futures	Clay	(Egypt) Sherif Sabry	(Austria) Lukas Jastraunig (Austria) Gerald Melzer	2–6, 3–6
Loss	0–3	Oct 2012	Turkey F40, Adana	Futures	Hard	(Moldova) Andrei Ciumac	(United Kingdom) Jack Carpenter (United Kingdom) George Morgan	3–6, 4–6
Win	1–3	Mar 2014	Egypt F9, Sharm El Sheikh	Futures	Clay	(Egypt) Sherif Sabry	(Egypt) Karim Hossam (Egypt) Mazen Osama	6–2, 6–3
Win	2–3	Mar 2014	Egypt F10, Sharm El Sheikh	Futures	Clay	(Egypt) Sherif Sabry	(Switzerland) Stefan Fiacan (Slovakia) Filip Horanský	4–6, 6–3, [10–6]
Win	3–3	Jun 2014	Mohammedia, Morocco	Challenger	Clay	(Brazil) Fabiano de Paula	(Germany) Richard Becker (France) Elie Rousset	6–2, 3–6, [10–6]
Win	4–3	Oct 2014	Egypt F28, Sharm El Sheikh	Futures	Hard	(Netherlands) Matwé Middelkoop	(Egypt) Sherif Sabry (Czech Republic) Libor Salaba	6–3, 6–4
Win	5–3	Oct 2014	Egypt F29, Sharm El Sheikh	Futures	Hard	(Netherlands) Matwé Middelkoop	(Czech Republic) Libor Salaba (Poland) Jan Zieliński	7–6^{(7–1)}, 6–3
Win	6–3	Nov 2014	Egypt F33, Sharm El Sheikh	Futures	Hard	(Egypt) Sherif Sabry	(Czech Republic) Jan Blecha (Austria) Pascal Brunner	6–3, 6–1
Loss	6–4	Jun 2015	Egypt F23, Sharm El Sheikh	Futures	Hard	(Syria) Issam Haitham Taweel	(Egypt) Karim-Mohamed Maamoun (Spain) David Pérez Sanz	5–7, 3–6
Win	7–4	Jul 2015	Italy F17, Sassuolo	Futures	Clay	(Austria) Tristan-Samuel Weissborn	(Italy) Alessandro Giannessi (Italy) Matteo Volante	4–6, 7–5, [10–8]
Win	8–4	Sep 2015	Egypt F32, Cairo	Futures	Clay	(Egypt) Karim-Mohamed Maamoun	(Switzerland) Luca Margaroli (France) Adrien Puget	6–4, 7–5
Loss	8–5	Oct 2015	Egypt F33, Sharm El Sheikh	Futures	Hard	(Egypt) Issam Haitham Taweel	(United Kingdom) Scott Clayton (United Kingdom) Jonny O'Mara	2–6, 4–6
Win	9–5	Oct 2015	Casablanca, Morocco	Challenger	Clay	(Lithuania) Laurynas Grigelis	(Netherlands) Thiemo de Bakker (Netherlands) Stephan Fransen	6–4, 6–3
Loss	9–6	Jan 2016	Egypt F1, Sharm El Sheikh	Futures	Hard	(Lithuania) Lukas Mugevičius	(Serbia) Darko Jandrić (Spain) Enrique López Pérez	3–6, 4–6
Win	10–6	Jan 2016	Egypt F2, Sharm El Sheikh	Futures	Hard	(Switzerland) Luca Margaroli	(Spain) Enrique López Pérez (France) Laurent Rochette	6–3, 3–6, [10–7]
Win	11–6	Feb 2016	Egypt F6, Sharm El Sheikh	Futures	Hard	(Egypt) Karim-Mohamed Maamoun	(Italy) Federico Bonacia (Italy) Matteo Fago	6–3, 5–7, [10–8]
Loss	11–7	Apr 2016	Nigeria F1, Abuja	Futures	Hard	(Egypt) Karim-Mohamed Maamoun	(United States) Nicolas Meister (Spain) Enrique López Pérez	3–6, 4–6
Win	12–7	Sep 2016	Meknes, Morocco	Challenger	Clay	(Switzerland) Luca Margaroli	(Spain) Pedro Martínez (Spain) Oriol Roca Batalla	6–4, 6–4
Win	13–7	Nov 2017	Finland F4, Helsinki	Futures	Hard (i)	(Russia) Evgeny Karlovskiy	(Russia) Vladimir Polyakov (Russia) Evgenii Tiurnev	7–6^{(7–2)}, 6–4
Loss	13–8	Feb 2019	Launceston, Australia	Challenger	Hard	(Japan) Hiroki Moriya	(Australia) Max Purcell (Australia) Luke Saville	5–7, 4–6

== Davis Cup ties played ==
22 ties played, 17 victories and 10 defeats in the singles; 7 victories and 4 defeats in the doubles (from 2009 to end of 2018)
