= Gabriella Taylor =

British tennis player (born 1998)

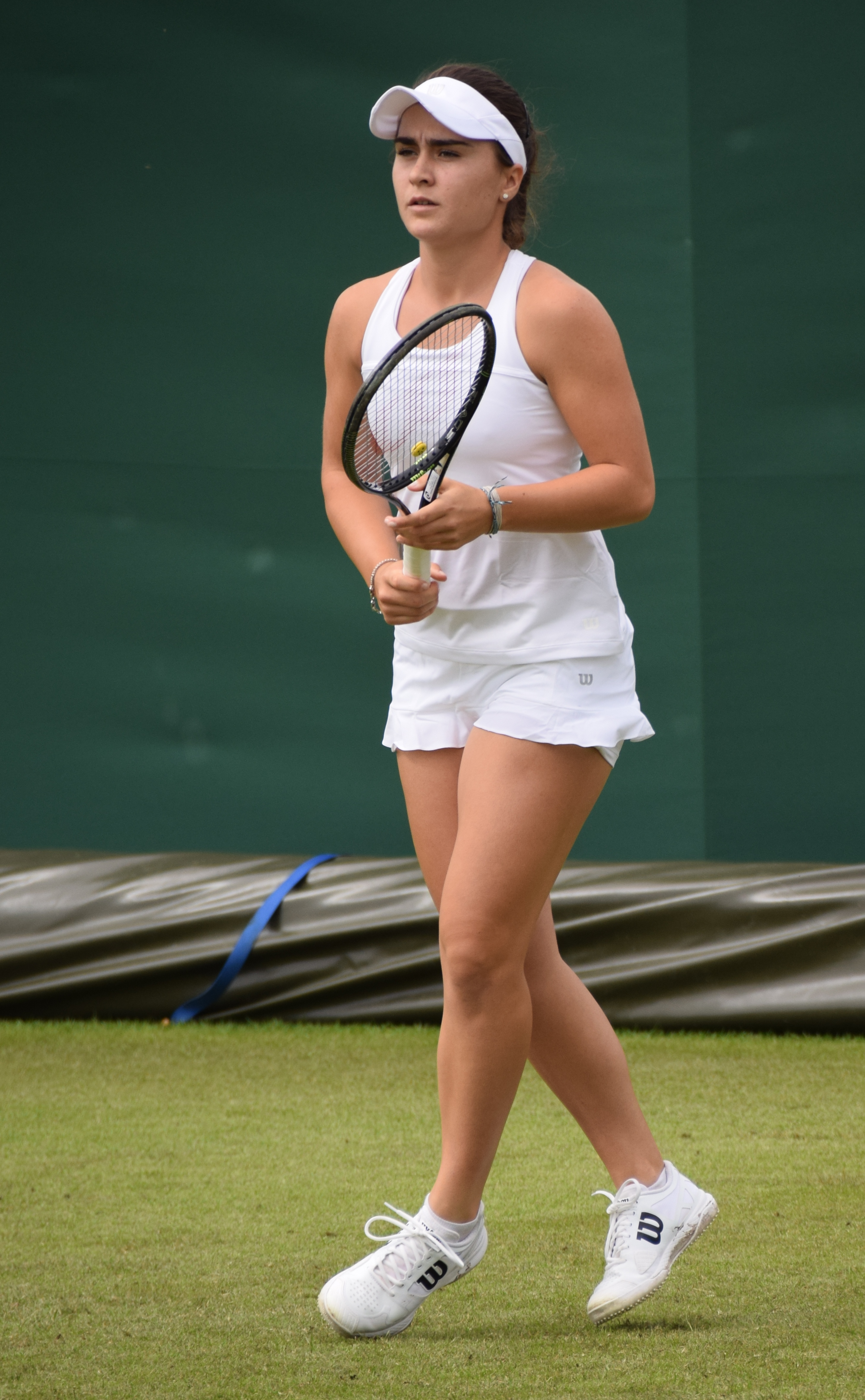
- Country (sports): (United Kingdom) Great Britain
- Residence: London, England, UK
- Born: 7 March 1998 (age 28) Southampton, England, UK
- Plays: Right (two-handed backhand)
- Prize money: $213,542

Singles
- Career record: 131–88
- Career titles: 6 ITF
- Highest ranking: No. 162 (10 December 2018)

Grand Slam singles results
- Australian Open: Q1 (2019)
- French Open: Q2 (2018)
- Wimbledon: 1R (2018)
- US Open: Q1 (2018)

Doubles
- Career record: 40–32
- Career titles: 3 ITF
- Highest ranking: No. 479 (19 March 2018)

Grand Slam doubles results
- Wimbledon: Q1 (2017)

Gabriella Patricia Taylor (born 7 March 1998) is a British former tennis player.

Taylor won six singles and three doubles titles on the ITF Women's Circuit. On 12 December 2018, she reached her best singles ranking of world No. 162. On 19 March 2018, she peaked at No. 479 in the WTA doubles rankings. Taylor retired from tennis in 2020.

== Early life ==
Taylor was born on 7 March 1998 in Southampton, to a British father from Newcastle and a Bulgarian mother from Plovdiv. She moved to Marbella, Spain at the age of 13 to further her tennis career and to Barcelona at 19. She turned professional at the age of 16.

== Career ==
=== Juniors ===
At the 2012 'British Junior National Championships' Taylor became under-14 girls' singles winner beating Katie Swan in the final 7–6^{(7)}, 6–3. Later in the year she was runner-up at the world's most prestigious junior tournament Junior Orange Bowl losing to Maia Lumsden, both players having been semifinalists in that year's European equivalent the Petits As. The following year the two players teamed up to become Under-16 British National Junior Champions in the doubles competition.

Taylor, Katie Swan, Freya Christie and Maia Lumsden were members of the 2014 British team, coached by Judy Murray, that triumphed in the Maureen Connolly Challenge Trophy, an annual under-18's competition against the USA.

=== 2015 ===
In November Taylor won her first ITF title in South Africa, unseeded she came from a set down to upset top seeded Naomi Totka of Hungary, in three sets.

=== 2016: Wimbledon Juniors 'poisoning' incident and recovery ===
In 2016, Taylor achieved her best juniors results in her sole junior major appearance at Wimbledon. She reached the quarterfinals but had to retire in the following match against Kayla Day. Taylor contracted a bacterial infection called leptospirosis, which would keep her from playing tennis for a month. Initially, she was thought to have been poisoned while her bag was left unoccupied, however, medical experts declared this to be highly unlikely. Police later concluded that there was no evidence of deliberate poisoning.

Taylor recovered sufficiently to reach three consecutive ITF finals at Heraklion, Greece in October and November although failing to win any.

=== 2017 ===
In May, as the sixth seed, she won her first $25k tournament, beating third seed Danielle Lao in the final in straight sets. Wimbledon granted wild card entries to her in both the singles and the doubles (partnering Freya Christie) qualifying draws, losing both in the first round. In November, she began working with coaches Xavier Budo and David Sunyer which she credits with changing her mindset, leading to her most successful period to date.

=== 2018 ===
After three ITF title wins in February and March, Taylor broke into the top 200 rankings for the first time. She was subsequently chosen to represent Great Britain in the Fed Cup team alongside Johanna Konta, Heather Watson and Anna Smith for the World Group II play-off tie in Japan, however she did not play in any of the matches.

Taylor made her WTA Tour main-draw debut at the 2018 Nottingham Open. As a wildcard entry, she lost in the first round to defending champion Donna Vekić, in three sets. In her first appearance in the main draw at Wimbledon, she lost to Eugenie Bouchard in three sets.

=== 2020 ===
Following struggles with her mental health, Taylor retired from tennis in 2020 to pursue a career in art. Her last professional tournament was an ITF event in Potchefstroom, South Africa, in March 2020, where she lost in a tight three-setter to Paige Hourigan in the round of 32.

== Grand Slam performance ==
Key
W	F	SF	QF	#R	RR	Q#	P#	DNQ	A	Z#	PO	G	S	B	NMS	NTI	P	NH

(W) winner; (F) finalist; (SF) semifinalist; (QF) quarterfinalist; (#R) rounds 4, 3, 2, 1; (RR) round-robin stage; (Q#) qualification round; (P#) preliminary round; (DNQ) did not qualify; (A) absent; (Z#) Davis/Fed Cup Zonal Group (with number indication) or (PO) play-off; (G) gold, (S) silver or (B) bronze Olympic/Paralympic medal; (NMS) not a Masters tournament; (NTI) not a Tier I tournament; (P) postponed; (NH) not held; (SR) strike rate (events won / competed); (W–L) win–loss record.
To avoid confusion and double counting, these charts are updated at the conclusion of a tournament or when the player's participation has ended.

Only main-draw results in WTA Tour, Grand Slam tournaments, Fed Cup/Billie Jean King Cup and Olympic Games are included in win–loss records.

=== Singles ===
Tournament	2014	2015	2016	2017	2018	2019	2020	SR	W–L
Australian Open	A	A	A	A	A	Q1	A	0 / 0	0–0
French Open	A	A	A	A	Q2	A	A	0 / 0	0–0
Wimbledon	Q2	A	Q2	Q1	1R	Q2	NH	0 / 1	0–1
US Open	A	A	A	A	Q1	A	A	0 / 0	0–0
Win–loss	0–0	0–0	0–0	0–0	0–1	0–0	0–0	0 / 1	0–1

== ITF Circuit finals ==
=== Singles: 12 (6 titles, 6 runner-ups) ===
Legend $50,000 tournaments $25,000 tournaments $10/15,000 tournaments	Finals by surface Hard (4–6) Clay (1–0) Grass (1–0)

Result	W–L	Date	Tournament	Tier	Surface	Opponent	Score
Win	1–0	Nov 2015	ITF Stellenbosch, South Africa	10,000	Clay	(Hungary) Naomi Totka	4–6, 6–2, 6–1
Loss	1–1	Oct 2016	ITF Heraklion, Greece	10,000	Hard	(Russia) Valeria Savinykh	2–6, 1–4 ret.
Loss	1–2	Nov 2016	ITF Heraklion, Greece	10,000	Hard	(Romania) Ioana Pietroiu	3–6, 6–2, 2–6
Loss	1–3	Nov 2016	ITF Heraklion, Greece	10,000	Hard	(Romania) Raluca Șerban	4–6, 5–7
Win	2–3	May 2017	ITF Changwon, South Korea	25,000	Hard	(United States) Danielle Lao	6–2, 6–2
Win	3–3	Dec 2017	ITF Mumbai, India	25,000	Hard	(Latvia) Diāna Marcinkēviča	4–6, 7–6^{(7)}, 6–3
Win	4–3	Feb 2018	Launceston International, Australia	25,000	Hard	(United States) Asia Muhammad	6–3, 6–4
Win	5–3	Feb 2018	ITF Perth, Australia	25,000	Hard	(France) Myrtille Georges	6–2, 7–5
Win	6–3	Mar 2018	ITF Mildura, Australia	25,000	Grass	(France) Shérazad Reix	6–0, 6–3
Loss	6–4	Mar 2019	ITF Nishi-Tama, Japan	25,000	Hard	(Ukraine) Daria Lopatetska	6–7^{(4)}, 6–2, 3–6
Loss	6–5	Oct 2019	ITF Antalya, Turkey	15,000	Hard	(Czech Republic) Magdaléna Pantůčková	3–6, 1–6
Loss	6–6	Oct 2019	ITF Antalya, Turkey	15,000	Hard	(Russia) Daria Kruzhkova	0–6, 0–3 ret.

=== Doubles: 5 (3 titles, 2 runner-ups) ===
Legend $75,000 tournaments $50,000 tournaments $25,000 tournaments $10/15,000 tournaments	Finals by surface Hard (2–0) Clay (0–1) Grass (1–0) Carpet (0–1)

Result	W–L	Date	Tournament	Tier	Surface	Partner	Opponents	Score
Win	1–0	May 2016	ITF Monzón, Spain	10,000	Hard	(France) Alice Bacquié	(Spain) Estrella Cabeza Candela (Spain) Cristina Sánchez-Quintanar	6–1, 6–1
Loss	1–1	Jul 2017	ITF Don Benito, Spain	15,000	Carpet	(Finland) Mia Eklund	(Italy) Maria Masini (Spain) Olga Parres Azcoitia	3–6, 3–6
Win	2–1	Mar 2018	ITF Mildura, Australia	25,000	Grass	(United Kingdom) Katy Dunne	(Australia) Alexandra Bozovic (Australia) Olivia Tjandramulia	5–7, 7–6^{(4)}, [10–5]
Loss	2–2	Sep 2019	ITF Marbella, Spain	25,000	Clay	(Netherlands) Arantxa Rus	(Spain) Andrea Lázaro García (Spain) Irene Burillo	7–5, 4–6, [4–10]
Win	3–2	Oct 2019	ITF Antalya, Turkey	15,000	Hard	(Austria) Mira Antonitsch	(Ukraine) Viktoriia Dema (Netherlands) Noa Liauw A Fong	6–4, 6–7^{(5)}, [10–3]
