= Bradley Mousley =

Australian tennis player (born 1996)

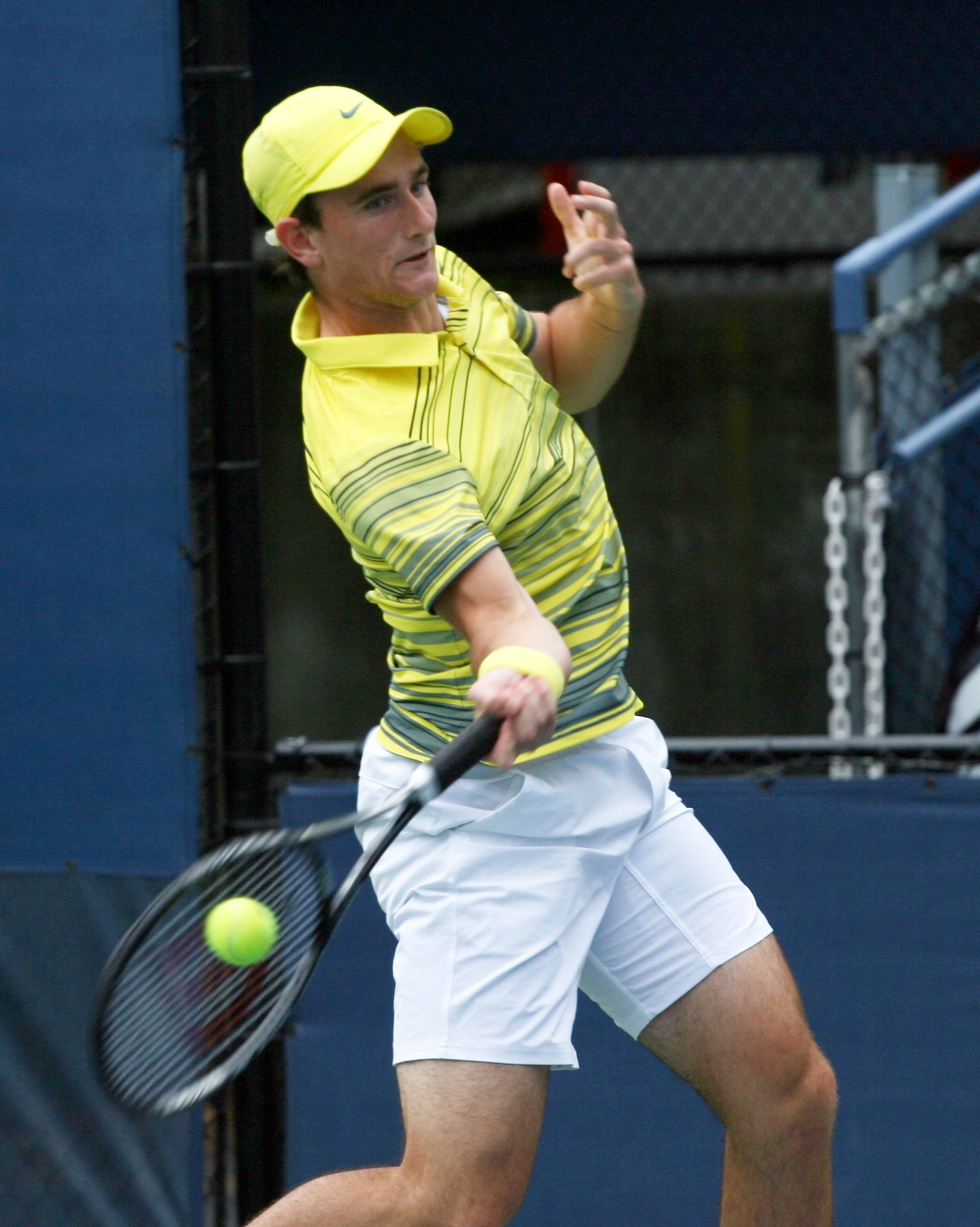
- Mousley in 2013
- Country (sports): Australia
- Residence: Adelaide, Australia
- Born: 3 January 1996 (age 30) Modbury, South Australia
- Height: 188 cm (6 ft 2 in)
- Turned pro: 2015
- Retired: 2023 (last match played)
- Plays: Right-handed (one-handed backhand)
- Coach: Jack Reader & Craig Mousley
- Prize money: $220,894

Singles
- Career record: 0-0
- Career titles: 0
- Highest ranking: No. 259 (26 February 2018)

Grand Slam singles results
- Australian Open: Q3 (2018)

Doubles
- Career record: 3–5
- Career titles: 0
- Highest ranking: No. 94 (15 January 2018)

Grand Slam doubles results
- Australian Open: QF (2017)

Grand Slam mixed doubles results
- Australian Open: 1R (2018)

Bradley Mousley (born 3 January 1996) is an Australian inactive tennis player. Mousley won the Australian Open boys' doubles title in both 2013 and 2014.

== Tennis career ==
=== Juniors ===
As a junior, Mousley reached a career-high ITF Junior combined ranking of world No. 14, achieved on 3 March 2014. Partnering compatriot Jay Andrijic, he won the 2013 Australian Open boys' doubles tournament at 17 years old. He successfully defended the title, winning the boys' doubles championship for the second consecutive year at the 2014 Australian Open, this time alongside partner Lucas Miedler of Austria.

=== 2014 ===
In August 2014, Mousley received a one-year ban, backdated to 30 May 2014, after testing positive for ecstasy in March. Mousley had admitted he had taken the drug at a party in March, and was originally given a two-year ban, but since the drug was not taken with the intent to enhance his performance, the ban was dropped to 12 months.

=== 2017: Australian Open quarterfinal in doubles ===
At the 2017 Australian Open, Mousley and partner Alex Bolt were granted a wildcard entry into the men's doubles main draw. Unexpectedly, they won three consecutive matches to reach the quarterfinals of the Grand Slam tournament, before being defeated by Spanish duo Pablo Carreño Busta and Guillermo García López in three sets.

=== 2019 ===
While competing in M15 World Tennis Tour tournament in Hua Hin Thailand, he injured his knee badly enough to have to withdraw from his singles semi-final match earlier in the day, and struggled to move freely from the start of his doubles finals match. He and partner Ajeet Rai were well-beaten by the top-seeded Ratiwatana twins in 40 minutes.

Mousley has won 2 singles titles and 18 doubles titles on the ATP Challenger and ITF Futures Tours.

== ATP Challenger and ITF Futures finals ==
=== Singles: 8 (2–6) ===
Legend (singles) ATP Challenger Tour (0–1) ITF Futures Tour (2–5)	Finals by surface Hard (2–5) Clay (0–0) Grass (0–1) Carpet (0–0)

Result	W–L	Date	Tournament	Tier	Surface	Opponent	Score
Loss	0–1	Jun 2015	Turkey F24, Istanbul	Futures	Hard	(Latvia) Mārtiņš Podžus	1–6, 0–6
Loss	0–2	Aug 2015	Turkey F30, Erzurum	Futures	Hard	(Russia) Alexander Igoshin	6–7^{(3–7)}, 6–4, 6–7^{(6–8)}
Win	1–2	Apr 2016	Greece F3, Heraklion	Futures	Hard	(Ukraine) Vladyslav Manafov	6–4, 6–3
Loss	1–3	Aug 2016	Egypt F18, Sharm El Sheikh	Futures	Hard	(Serbia) Nikola Milojević	6–3, 3–6, 3–6
Loss	1–4	Mar 2017	Australia F1, Mildura	Futures	Grass	(Australia) Dayne Kelly	6–4, 4–6, 6–7^{(4–7)}
Loss	1–5	Apr 2017	China F5, Luzhou	Futures	Hard	(China) Fajing Sun	6–7^{(2–7)}, 2–6
Win	2–5	Oct 2017	Australia F5, Brisbane	Futures	Hard	(Australia) Benjamin Mitchell	6–3, 4–6, 6–2
Loss	2–6	Feb 2018	Launceston, Australia	Challenger	Hard	(Australia) Marc Polmans	2–6, 2–6

=== Doubles: 32 (18–14) ===
Legend (singles) ATP Challenger Tour (4–3) ITF Futures Tour (14–11)	Finals by surface Hard (13–9) Clay (5–4) Grass (0–1)

Result	W–L	Date	Tournament	Tier	Surface	Partner	Opponents	Score
Loss	0–1	May 2013	Spain F13, Lleida	Futures	Clay	(Australia) Jay Andrijic	(Spain) Miguel Ángel López Jaén (Spain) Jordi Marse-Vidri	5–7, 4–6
Win	1–1	May 2013	Spain F14, Valldoreix	Futures	Clay	(Australia) Jay Andrijic	(Spain) Miguel Ángel López Jaén (Spain) Jordi Marse-Vidri	6–3, 6–4
Loss	1–2	Mar 2014	Australia F2, Port Pirie	Futures	Hard	(Australia) Jordan Thompson	(Australia) Gavin Van Peperzeel (Australia) Maverick Bains	3–6, 3–6
Win	2–2	Apr 2014	Australia F4, Melbourne	Futures	Clay	(Australia) Jordan Thompson	(Australia) Adam Hubble (Australia) Matt Reid	walkover
Loss	2–3	Jun 2015	Turkey F23, Bursa	Futures	Hard	(Turkey) Tuna Altuna	(Belgium) Julien Dubail (France) Yannick Jankovits	2–6, 2–6
Win	3–3	Jun 2015	Turkey F24, Istanbul	Futures	Hard	(Turkey) Tuna Altuna	(Russia) Fedor Chervyakov (Georgia (country)) Aleksandre Metreveli	7–6^{(7–1)}, 7–6^{(7–2)}
Win	4–3	Jun 2015	Turkey F25, Istanbul	Futures	Hard	(Turkey) Tuna Altuna	(Uzbekistan) Temur Ismailov (Russia) Markos Kalovelonis	6–4, 6–4
Loss	4–4	Jul 2015	Great Britain F6, Frinton	Futures	Grass	(United Kingdom) Evan Hoyt	(United Kingdom) Daniel Smethurst (United Kingdom) Marcus Willis	4–6, 4–6
Win	5–4	Aug 2015	Turkey F30, Erzurum	Futures	Hard	(Turkey) Tuna Altuna	(Russia) Alexander Igoshin (Republic of Ireland) Daniel Glancy	7–5, 6–4
Loss	5–5	Nov 2015	Traralgon, Australia	Challenger	Hard	(Australia) Omar Jasika	(Australia) Dayne Kelly (Australia) Marinko Matosevic	5–7, 2–6
Loss	5–6	Mar 2016	Australia F3, Mornington	Futures	Clay	(Australia) Gavin Van Peperzeel	(Australia) Greg Jones (Australia) Andrew Whittington	3–6, 2–6
Loss	5–7	Mar 2016	Australia F4, Mornington	Futures	Clay	(Australia) Gavin Van Peperzeel	(Australia) Steven de Waard (Australia) Marc Polmans	2–6, 3–6
Win	6–7	Apr 2016	Greece F4, Heraklion	Futures	Hard	(Ukraine) Vladyslav Manafov	(United Kingdom) Edward Corrie (Russia) Lloyd Glasspool	6–2, 6–3
Loss	6–8	Apr 2016	Greece F5, Heraklion	Futures	Hard	(Ukraine) Vladyslav Manafov	(Poland) Karol Drzewiecki (Brazil) Bruno Sant'Anna	6–7^{(3–7)}, 6–2, [7–10]
Win	7–8	May 2016	Croatia F5, Bol	Futures	Clay	(Australia) Omar Jasika	(Germany) Tobias Simon (Netherlands) Tallon Griekspoor	7–5, 7–6^{(7–5)}
Loss	7–9	Jul 2016	Germany F5, Kamen	Futures	Clay	(Australia) Scott Puodziunas	(Germany) Johannes Härteis (Germany) Hannes Wagner	6–7^{(6–8)}, 6–2, [6–10]
Win	8–9	Jul 2016	Egypt F17, Sharm El Sheikh	Futures	Hard	(Czech Republic) Marek Jaloviec	(Italy) Lorenzo Frigerio (Italy) Andrea Vavassori	2–6, 6–3, [10–4]
Win	9–9	Aug 2016	Egypt F18, Sharm El Sheikh	Futures	Hard	(Czech Republic) Marek Jaloviec	(Italy) Luca Pancaldi (Italy) Andrea Vavassori	6–1, 6–2
Win	10–9	Aug 2016	Egypt F20, Sharm El Sheikh	Futures	Hard	(Australia) Nathan Eshmade	(United Kingdom) Imran Aswat (Peru) Alexander Merino	6–1, 6–0
Win	11–9	Oct 2016	Australia F6, Brisbane	Futures	Hard	(Australia) Dayne Kelly	(Australia) Harry Bourchier (Australia) James Frawley	6–2, 6–3
Win	12–9	Feb 2017	Launceston, Australia	Challenger	Hard	(Australia) Luke Saville	(Australia) Alex Bolt (Australia) Andrew Whittington	6–2, 6–1
Win	13–9	Mar 2017	Australia F3, Canberra	Futures	Clay	(Australia) Marc Polmans	(Australia) Steven de Waard (Australia) Scott Puodziunas	6–4, 7–6^{(7–4)}
Win	14–9	Jun 2017	Turkey F23, Istanbul	Futures	Clay	(Spain) Mario Vilella Martínez	(Bolivia) Hugo Dellien (Bolivia) Federico Zeballos	6–3, 6–3
Loss	14–10	Jun 2017	Portugal F8, Lisbon	Futures	Hard	(Republic of Ireland) Sam Barry	(Portugal) Nuno Borges (Portugal) Francisco Cabral	1–6, 6–3, [5–10]
Loss	14–11	Sep 2017	Australia F4, Alice Springs	Futures	Hard	(Australia) Darren Polkinghorne	(Australia) Dane Propoggia (Australia) Scott Puodziunas	4–6, 4–6
Win	15–11	Oct 2017	Australia F6, Toowoomba	Futures	Hard	(China) Zhe Li	(United States) Nathan Pasha (Australia) Darren Polkinghorne	6–4, 7–6^{(7–4)}
Win	16–11	Oct 2017	Traralgon, Australia	Challenger	Hard	(Australia) Alex Bolt	(United States) Evan King (United States) Nathan Pasha	6–4, 6–2
Win	17–11	Nov 2017	Canberra, Australia	Challenger	Hard	(Australia) Alex Bolt	(Australia) Luke Saville (Australia) Andrew Whittington	6–3, 6–2
Win	18–11	Feb 2018	Launceston, Australia	Challenger	Hard	(Australia) Alex Bolt	(United States) Sekou Bangoura (United States) Nathan Pasha	7–6^{(8–6)}, 6–0
Loss	18–12	Apr 2018	Leon, Mexico	Challenger	Hard	(Australia) John-Patrick Smith	(Ecuador) Gonzalo Escobar (Mexico) Manuel Sánchez	4–6, 4–6
Loss	18–13	Sep 2018	Zhangjiagang, China	Challenger	Hard	(Australia) Akira Santillan	(China) Mao-Xin Gong (China) Ze Zhang	walkover
Loss	18–14	Aug 2019	M15 Hua Hin, Thailand	World Tennis Tour	Hard	(New Zealand) Ajeet Rai	(Thailand) Sanchai Ratiwatana (Thailand) Sonchat Ratiwatana	2–6, 0–6

== Junior Grand Slam finals ==
=== Doubles: 2 (2 titles) ===
Outcome	Year	Championship	Surface	Partner	Opponent	Score
Winner	2013	Australian Open	Hard	(Australia) Jay Andrijic	(Germany) Maximilian Marterer (Austria) Lucas Miedler	6–3, 7–6^{(7–3)}
Winner	2014	Australian Open	Hard	(Austria) Lucas Miedler	(France) Quentin Halys (France) Johan Sébastien Tatlot	6–4, 6–3
