= 2017 ITF Women's Circuit (January–March) =

Tennis tournament series

The 2017 ITF Women's Circuit is the 2017 edition of the second tier tour for women's professional tennis. It is organized by the International Tennis Federation and is a tier below the WTA Tour. It includes tournaments with prize money ranging from $15,000 up to $100,000.

== Key ==
Category
$100,000 tournaments
$80,000 tournaments
$60,000 tournaments
$25,000 tournaments
$15,000 tournaments

== Month ==
=== January ===
Week of	Tournament	Winner	Runners-up	Semifinalists	Quarterfinalists
January 2	ITF Women's Circuit – Hong Kong; Hong Kong; Hard $25,000; Singles and doubles draws	(Chinese Taipei) Lee Ya-hsuan; 2–6, 7–6^{(7–4)}, 6–3	(United Kingdom) Tara Moore	(Japan) Hiroko Kuwata (Japan) Miharu Imanishi	(China) Lu Jiajing (Japan) Junri Namigata (Czech Republic) Barbora Krejčíková (Thailand) Luksika Kumkhum
January 2	ITF Women's Circuit – Hong Kong; Hong Kong; Hard $25,000; Singles and doubles draws	(Japan) Hiroko Kuwata (Japan) Akiko Omae; 6–1, 6–0	(Russia) Ksenia Lykina (Japan) Riko Sawayanagi	(Japan) Hiroko Kuwata (Japan) Miharu Imanishi	(China) Lu Jiajing (Japan) Junri Namigata (Czech Republic) Barbora Krejčíková (Thailand) Luksika Kumkhum
January 9	Daytona Beach, United States; Clay $25,000; Singles and doubles draws	(Ukraine) Anhelina Kalinina; 6–1, 6–2	(United States) Elizabeth Halbauer	(United States) Caroline Dolehide (Russia) Sofya Zhuk	(Russia) Polina Leykina (Norway) Ulrikke Eikeri (Slovakia) Viktória Kužmová (United States) Danielle Collins
January 9	Daytona Beach, United States; Clay $25,000; Singles and doubles draws	(United States) Robin Anderson (Ukraine) Anhelina Kalinina; 6–4, 6–1	(Poland) Paula Kania (Poland) Katarzyna Piter	(United States) Caroline Dolehide (Russia) Sofya Zhuk	(Russia) Polina Leykina (Norway) Ulrikke Eikeri (Slovakia) Viktória Kužmová (United States) Danielle Collins
January 9	Fort-de-France, Martinique, France; Hard $15,000; Singles and doubles draws	(Mexico) Giuliana Olmos; 7–5, 6–1	(Czech Republic) Monika Kilnarová	(Japan) Mayo Hibi (Chinese Taipei) Hsu Chieh-yu	(France) Alice Ramé (Hong Kong) Zhang Ling (France) Lucie Wargnier (United States) Alexandra Morozova
January 9	Fort-de-France, Martinique, France; Hard $15,000; Singles and doubles draws	(United States) Desirae Krawczyk (Mexico) Giuliana Olmos; 6–3, 6–2	(France) Sara Cakarevic (France) Emmanuelle Salas	(Japan) Mayo Hibi (Chinese Taipei) Hsu Chieh-yu	(France) Alice Ramé (Hong Kong) Zhang Ling (France) Lucie Wargnier (United States) Alexandra Morozova
January 9	Hammamet, Tunisia; Clay $15,000; Singles and doubles draws	(Spain) María Teresa Torró Flor; 6–2, 6–2	(Austria) Julia Grabher	(France) Victoria Muntean (France) Joséphine Boualem	(Italy) Verena Hofer (Russia) Yana Sizikova (Germany) Katharina Gerlach (United States) Anastasia Nefedova
January 9	Hammamet, Tunisia; Clay $15,000; Singles and doubles draws	(France) Chloé Paquet (Spain) María Teresa Torró Flor; 6–4, 6–4	(France) Joséphine Boualem (Austria) Julia Grabher	(France) Victoria Muntean (France) Joséphine Boualem	(Italy) Verena Hofer (Russia) Yana Sizikova (Germany) Katharina Gerlach (United States) Anastasia Nefedova
January 9	Antalya, Turkey; Clay $15,000; Singles and doubles draws	(Ukraine) Anastasiya Vasylyeva; 7–5, 6–3	(Germany) Tayisiya Morderger	(Ukraine) Sofiya Kovalets (Ukraine) Kateryna Sliusar	(Russia) Olesya Pervushina (Serbia) Dejana Radanović (Ukraine) Viktoriya Petrenko (Ukraine) Alona Fomina
January 9	Antalya, Turkey; Clay $15,000; Singles and doubles draws	(Germany) Tayisiya Morderger (Germany) Yana Morderger; 3–6, 7–6^{(7–1)}, [10–6]	(Ukraine) Sofiya Kovalets (Ukraine) Kateryna Sliusar	(Ukraine) Sofiya Kovalets (Ukraine) Kateryna Sliusar	(Russia) Olesya Pervushina (Serbia) Dejana Radanović (Ukraine) Viktoriya Petrenko (Ukraine) Alona Fomina
January 16	Orlando, United States; Clay $25,000; Singles and doubles draws	(Poland) Katarzyna Piter; 6–7^{(4–7)}, 6–2, 6–4	(United States) Sofia Kenin	(United States) Elizabeth Halbauer (Canada) Katherine Sebov	(Russia) Polina Leykina (United States) Kristie Ahn (Ukraine) Anhelina Kalinina (Ukraine) Olga Fridman
January 16	Orlando, United States; Clay $25,000; Singles and doubles draws	(United States) Sophie Chang (United States) Madeleine Kobelt; 6–3, 3–6, [10–6]	(Poland) Paula Kania (Poland) Katarzyna Piter	(United States) Elizabeth Halbauer (Canada) Katherine Sebov	(Russia) Polina Leykina (United States) Kristie Ahn (Ukraine) Anhelina Kalinina (Ukraine) Olga Fridman
January 16	Cairo, Egypt; Clay $15,000; Singles and doubles draws	(Romania) Oana Georgeta Simion; 6–4, 6–3	(Romania) Cristina Ene	(Belgium) Hélène Scholsen (Egypt) Sandra Samir	(Slovakia) Chantal Škamlová (Japan) Ayaka Okuno (Oman) Fatma Al-Nabhani (Serbia) Bojana Marinković
January 16	Cairo, Egypt; Clay $15,000; Singles and doubles draws	(Japan) Ayaka Okuno (Slovakia) Chantal Škamlová; 4–6, 6–4, [10–6]	(Oman) Fatma Al-Nabhani (Egypt) Sandra Samir	(Belgium) Hélène Scholsen (Egypt) Sandra Samir	(Slovakia) Chantal Škamlová (Japan) Ayaka Okuno (Oman) Fatma Al-Nabhani (Serbia) Bojana Marinković
January 16	Petit-Bourg, Guadeloupe, France; Hard $15,000; Singles and doubles draws	(Japan) Mayo Hibi; 6–3, 6–0	(Mexico) Giuliana Olmos	(Japan) Mari Osaka (Czech Republic) Monika Kilnarová	(France) Estelle Cascino (Canada) Carol Zhao (Moldova) Anastasia Dețiuc (Hong Kong) Zhang Ling
January 16	Petit-Bourg, Guadeloupe, France; Hard $15,000; Singles and doubles draws	(Japan) Mayo Hibi (Canada) Carol Zhao; 2–6, 7–6^{(8–6)}, [11–9]	(Denmark) Emilie Francati (Canada) Charlotte Robillard-Millette	(Japan) Mari Osaka (Czech Republic) Monika Kilnarová	(France) Estelle Cascino (Canada) Carol Zhao (Moldova) Anastasia Dețiuc (Hong Kong) Zhang Ling
January 16	Stuttgart, Germany; Hard (indoor) $15,000; Singles and doubles draws	(Czech Republic) Markéta Vondroušová; 3–6, 6–2, 6–1	(Germany) Anna Zaja	(Belgium) Greet Minnen (France) Lou Brouleau	(Germany) Katharina Hobgarski (United States) Ronit Yurovsky (Russia) Ekaterina Kazionova (Ukraine) Anastasiya Shoshyna
January 16	Stuttgart, Germany; Hard (indoor) $15,000; Singles and doubles draws	(Czech Republic) Miriam Kolodziejová (Czech Republic) Markéta Vondroušová; 7–6^{(7–3)}, 7–5	(Bosnia and Herzegovina) Anita Husarić (Belgium) Kimberley Zimmermann	(Belgium) Greet Minnen (France) Lou Brouleau	(Germany) Katharina Hobgarski (United States) Ronit Yurovsky (Russia) Ekaterina Kazionova (Ukraine) Anastasiya Shoshyna
January 16	Hammamet, Tunisia; Clay $15,000; Singles and doubles draws	(Spain) María Teresa Torró Flor; 6–3, ret.	(Romania) Alexandra Dulgheru	(Venezuela) Andrea Gámiz (Brazil) Laura Pigossi	(Romania) Cristina Dinu (France) Marine Partaud (France) Joséphine Boualem (Austria) Julia Grabher
January 16	Hammamet, Tunisia; Clay $15,000; Singles and doubles draws	(Brazil) Laura Pigossi (Spain) María Teresa Torró Flor; 6–2, 6–4	(Romania) Cristina Dinu (Russia) Yana Sizikova	(Venezuela) Andrea Gámiz (Brazil) Laura Pigossi	(Romania) Cristina Dinu (France) Marine Partaud (France) Joséphine Boualem (Austria) Julia Grabher
January 16	Antalya, Turkey; Clay $15,000; Singles and doubles draws	(Russia) Aleksandra Pospelova; 6–4, 1–6, 6–4	(Ukraine) Anastasiya Vasylyeva	(Ukraine) Alona Fomina (Germany) Tayisiya Morderger	(Russia) Olesya Pervushina (Serbia) Dejana Radanović (Colombia) María Fernanda Herazo (Ukraine) Sofiya Kovalets
January 16	Antalya, Turkey; Clay $15,000; Singles and doubles draws	(Colombia) María Fernanda Herazo (Ukraine) Kateryna Sliusar; 7–6^{(7–1)}, 6–0	(Russia) Olesya Pervushina (Russia) Aleksandra Pospelova	(Ukraine) Alona Fomina (Germany) Tayisiya Morderger	(Russia) Olesya Pervushina (Serbia) Dejana Radanović (Colombia) María Fernanda Herazo (Ukraine) Sofiya Kovalets
January 23	Engie Open Andrézieux-Bouthéon 42; Andrézieux-Bouthéon, France; Hard (indoor) $60,000; Singles – Doubles	(Estonia) Anett Kontaveit; 6–4, 7–6^{(7–5)}	(Serbia) Ivana Jorović	(Switzerland) Amra Sadiković (Czech Republic) Tereza Smitková	(United Kingdom) Laura Robson (Germany) Tamara Korpatsch (France) Lou Brouleau (Czech Republic) Tereza Martincová
January 23	Engie Open Andrézieux-Bouthéon 42; Andrézieux-Bouthéon, France; Hard (indoor) $60,000; Singles – Doubles	(Germany) Nicola Geuer (Germany) Anna Zaja; 6–3, 2–2 ret.	(Romania) Ana Bogdan (Romania) Ioana Loredana Roșca	(Switzerland) Amra Sadiković (Czech Republic) Tereza Smitková	(United Kingdom) Laura Robson (Germany) Tamara Korpatsch (France) Lou Brouleau (Czech Republic) Tereza Martincová
January 23	Wesley Chapel, United States; Clay $25,000; Singles and doubles draws	(Ukraine) Anhelina Kalinina; 6–4, 6–4	(Ukraine) Elizaveta Ianchuk	(United States) Brianna Morgan (United States) Sofia Kenin	(United States) Lauren Embree (Czech Republic) Jesika Malečková (Poland) Paula Kania (United States) Robin Anderson
January 23	Wesley Chapel, United States; Clay $25,000; Singles and doubles draws	(South Africa) Chanel Simmonds (Mexico) Renata Zarazúa; 6–2, 7–6^{(7–5)}	(United States) Elizabeth Halbauer (United States) Sofia Kenin	(United States) Brianna Morgan (United States) Sofia Kenin	(United States) Lauren Embree (Czech Republic) Jesika Malečková (Poland) Paula Kania (United States) Robin Anderson
January 23	Cairo, Egypt; Clay $15,000; Singles and doubles draws	(Belgium) Hélène Scholsen; 6–2, 7–5	(Oman) Fatma Al-Nabhani	(Slovakia) Chantal Škamlová (Romania) Cristina Ene	(Romania) Oana Georgeta Simion (Bulgaria) Petia Arshinkova (Russia) Anastasia Sukhotina (Egypt) Sandra Samir
January 23	Cairo, Egypt; Clay $15,000; Singles and doubles draws	(Japan) Ayaka Okuno (Slovakia) Chantal Škamlová; 6–3, 6–1	(Oman) Fatma Al-Nabhani (Egypt) Sandra Samir	(Slovakia) Chantal Škamlová (Romania) Cristina Ene	(Romania) Oana Georgeta Simion (Bulgaria) Petia Arshinkova (Russia) Anastasia Sukhotina (Egypt) Sandra Samir
January 23	Saint Martin, Guadeloupe, France; Hard $15,000; Singles and doubles draws	(France) Priscilla Heise; 6–2, 6–2	(France) Estelle Cascino	(Mexico) Giuliana Olmos (United States) Ashley Kratzer	(Chinese Taipei) Hsu Chieh-yu (France) Amandine Cazeaux (France) Sara Cakarevic (United States) Amy Zhu
January 23	Saint Martin, Guadeloupe, France; Hard $15,000; Singles and doubles draws	(United States) Desirae Krawczyk (Mexico) Giuliana Olmos; 6–1, 6–1	(Netherlands) Chayenne Ewijk (Netherlands) Rosalie van der Hoek	(Mexico) Giuliana Olmos (United States) Ashley Kratzer	(Chinese Taipei) Hsu Chieh-yu (France) Amandine Cazeaux (France) Sara Cakarevic (United States) Amy Zhu
January 23	Almaty, Kazakhstan; Hard (indoor) $15,000; Singles and doubles draws	(Russia) Polina Monova; 6–3, 6–3	(Russia) Ekaterina Kazionova	(Japan) Akari Inoue (Russia) Anastasia Pribylova	(Belarus) Eva Alexandrova (Kazakhstan) Gozal Ainitdinova (Philippines) Katharina Lehnert (Kazakhstan) Kamila Kerimbayeva
January 23	Almaty, Kazakhstan; Hard (indoor) $15,000; Singles and doubles draws	(Russia) Alina Silich (Netherlands) Erika Vogelsang; 6–3, 4–6, [10–6]	(Japan) Akari Inoue (Japan) Mai Minokoshi	(Japan) Akari Inoue (Russia) Anastasia Pribylova	(Belarus) Eva Alexandrova (Kazakhstan) Gozal Ainitdinova (Philippines) Katharina Lehnert (Kazakhstan) Kamila Kerimbayeva
January 23	Hammamet, Tunisia; Clay $15,000; Singles and doubles draws	(Romania) Cristina Dinu; 6–2, 6–1	(Germany) Katharina Gerlach	(Bosnia and Herzegovina) Jelena Simić (Romania) Georgia Andreea Crăciun	(France) Emmanuelle Girard (Russia) Yana Sizikova (France) Victoria Muntean (Spain) Paula Badosa Gibert
January 23	Hammamet, Tunisia; Clay $15,000; Singles and doubles draws	(Greece) Despina Papamichail (Brazil) Laura Pigossi; 6–3, 4–6, [10–5]	(France) Victoria Muntean (China) Sun Xuliu	(Bosnia and Herzegovina) Jelena Simić (Romania) Georgia Andreea Crăciun	(France) Emmanuelle Girard (Russia) Yana Sizikova (France) Victoria Muntean (Spain) Paula Badosa Gibert
January 23	Antalya, Turkey; Clay $15,000; Singles and doubles draws	(Romania) Raluca Georgiana Șerban; 6–2, 6–3	(Ukraine) Alona Fomina	(Germany) Yana Morderger (Serbia) Dejana Radanović	(Bulgaria) Julia Stamatova (Chinese Taipei) Lee Pei-chi (Germany) Tayisiya Morderger (Bulgaria) Dia Evtimova
January 23	Antalya, Turkey; Clay $15,000; Singles and doubles draws	(Bulgaria) Dia Evtimova (Bosnia and Herzegovina) Jasmina Tinjić; 6–4, 6–7^{(4–7)}, [10–5]	(Germany) Tayisiya Morderger (Germany) Yana Morderger	(Germany) Yana Morderger (Serbia) Dejana Radanović	(Bulgaria) Julia Stamatova (Chinese Taipei) Lee Pei-chi (Germany) Tayisiya Morderger (Bulgaria) Dia Evtimova
January 30	Dow Tennis Classic; Midland, United States; Hard (indoor) $100,000; Singles – Doubles	(Germany) Tatjana Maria; 6–4, 6–7^{(6–8)}, 6–4	(United Kingdom) Naomi Broady	(United States) Julia Boserup (Canada) Katherine Sebov	(United States) Kayla Day (Slovakia) Anna Karolína Schmiedlová (Bulgaria) Sesil Karatantcheva (United States) Varvara Lepchenko
January 30	Dow Tennis Classic; Midland, United States; Hard (indoor) $100,000; Singles – Doubles	(United States) Ashley Weinhold (United States) Caitlin Whoriskey; 7–6^{(7–1)}, 6–3	(United States) Kayla Day (United States) Caroline Dolehide	(United States) Julia Boserup (Canada) Katherine Sebov	(United States) Kayla Day (Slovakia) Anna Karolína Schmiedlová (Bulgaria) Sesil Karatantcheva (United States) Varvara Lepchenko
January 30	Burnie International; Burnie, Australia; Hard $60,000; Singles – Doubles	(United States) Asia Muhammad; 6–2, 6–1	(Australia) Arina Rodionova	(Czech Republic) Marie Bouzková (United States) Taylor Townsend	(Canada) Aleksandra Wozniak (Slovenia) Tamara Zidanšek (Russia) Elizaveta Kulichkova (Australia) Olivia Rogowska
January 30	Burnie International; Burnie, Australia; Hard $60,000; Singles – Doubles	(Japan) Riko Sawayanagi (Czech Republic) Barbora Štefková; 7–6^{(8–6)}, 4–6, [10–7]	(Australia) Alison Bai (Thailand) Varatchaya Wongteanchai	(Czech Republic) Marie Bouzková (United States) Taylor Townsend	(Canada) Aleksandra Wozniak (Slovenia) Tamara Zidanšek (Russia) Elizaveta Kulichkova (Australia) Olivia Rogowska
January 30	Grenoble, France; Hard (indoor) $25,000; Singles and doubles draws	(Czech Republic) Markéta Vondroušová; 7–5, 6–4	(Russia) Anna Blinkova	(Russia) Valeriya Solovyeva (Czech Republic) Tereza Smitková	(Liechtenstein) Kathinka von Deichmann (France) Virginie Razzano (Switzerland) Amra Sadiković (Netherlands) Quirine Lemoine
January 30	Grenoble, France; Hard (indoor) $25,000; Singles and doubles draws	(Belarus) Ilona Kremen (Czech Republic) Tereza Smitková; 6–1, 7–5	(Romania) Alexandra Cadanțu (Sweden) Cornelia Lister	(Russia) Valeriya Solovyeva (Czech Republic) Tereza Smitková	(Liechtenstein) Kathinka von Deichmann (France) Virginie Razzano (Switzerland) Amra Sadiković (Netherlands) Quirine Lemoine
January 30	Cairo, Egypt; Clay $15,000; Singles and doubles draws	(Slovakia) Chantal Škamlová; 3–6, 7–6^{(7–1)}, 6–1	(Switzerland) Jil Teichmann	(Japan) Ayaka Okuno (Egypt) Sandra Samir	(Switzerland) Karin Kennel (Germany) Dana Kremer (United States) Shelby Talcott (Belgium) Hélène Scholsen
January 30	Cairo, Egypt; Clay $15,000; Singles and doubles draws	(India) Natasha Palha (India) Rishika Sunkara; 6–2, 6–1	(Egypt) Sandra Samir (United States) Shelby Talcott	(Japan) Ayaka Okuno (Egypt) Sandra Samir	(Switzerland) Karin Kennel (Germany) Dana Kremer (United States) Shelby Talcott (Belgium) Hélène Scholsen
January 30	Almaty, Kazakhstan; Hard (indoor) $15,000; Singles and doubles draws	(Russia) Olga Doroshina; 4–1 ret.	(Russia) Polina Monova	(Russia) Alina Silich (Russia) Anna Morgina	(Russia) Daria Kruzhkova (France) Caroline Roméo (Russia) Valeriya Urzhumova (Russia) Ekaterina Kazionova
January 30	Almaty, Kazakhstan; Hard (indoor) $15,000; Singles and doubles draws	(Russia) Olga Doroshina (Russia) Polina Monova; 6–1, 6–2	(Austria) Pia König (Philippines) Katharina Lehnert	(Russia) Alina Silich (Russia) Anna Morgina	(Russia) Daria Kruzhkova (France) Caroline Roméo (Russia) Valeriya Urzhumova (Russia) Ekaterina Kazionova
January 30	Hammamet, Tunisia; Clay $15,000; Singles and doubles draws	(Bosnia and Herzegovina) Jelena Simić; 6–7^{(5–7)}, 6–4, 7–6^{(7–2)}	(Russia) Yana Sizikova	(France) Audrey Albié (Switzerland) Leonie Küng	(Spain) Paula Badosa Gibert (Italy) Giorgia Marchetti (Italy) Angelica Moratelli (Italy) Beatrice Lombardo
January 30	Hammamet, Tunisia; Clay $15,000; Singles and doubles draws	(Italy) Giorgia Marchetti (Italy) Angelica Moratelli; 6–4, 6–3	(Chinese Taipei) Hsu Chieh-yu (Russia) Yana Sizikova	(France) Audrey Albié (Switzerland) Leonie Küng	(Spain) Paula Badosa Gibert (Italy) Giorgia Marchetti (Italy) Angelica Moratelli (Italy) Beatrice Lombardo
January 30	Antalya, Turkey; Clay $15,000; Singles and doubles draws	(Germany) Yana Morderger; 6–4, 6–3	(Germany) Tayisiya Morderger	(Bulgaria) Julia Stamatova (Slovenia) Nastja Kolar	(Romania) Raluca Georgiana Șerban (Bulgaria) Dia Evtimova (Germany) Sabrina Rittberger (Ukraine) Alona Fomina
January 30	Antalya, Turkey; Clay $15,000; Singles and doubles draws	(Bulgaria) Dia Evtimova (Bosnia and Herzegovina) Jasmina Tinjić; 2–6, 6–3, [10–8]	(Germany) Tayisiya Morderger (Germany) Yana Morderger	(Bulgaria) Julia Stamatova (Slovenia) Nastja Kolar	(Romania) Raluca Georgiana Șerban (Bulgaria) Dia Evtimova (Germany) Sabrina Rittberger (Ukraine) Alona Fomina
January 30	Aegon GB Pro-Series Glasgow; Glasgow, United Kingdom; Hard (indoor) $15,000; Singles and doubles draws	(Czech Republic) Petra Krejsová; 2–6, 7–5, 6–4	(Netherlands) Bibiane Schoofs	(Belgium) Kimberley Zimmermann (Germany) Julia Wachaczyk	(Switzerland) Tess Sugnaux (United States) Ronit Yurovsky (France) Mallaurie Noël (United States) Emina Bektas
January 30	Aegon GB Pro-Series Glasgow; Glasgow, United Kingdom; Hard (indoor) $15,000; Singles and doubles draws	(United Kingdom) Jocelyn Rae (United Kingdom) Anna Smith; 6–3, 6–2	(Romania) Laura-Ioana Andrei (Czech Republic) Petra Krejsová	(Belgium) Kimberley Zimmermann (Germany) Julia Wachaczyk	(Switzerland) Tess Sugnaux (United States) Ronit Yurovsky (France) Mallaurie Noël (United States) Emina Bektas

=== February ===
Week of	Tournament	Winner	Runners-up	Semifinalists	Quarterfinalists
February 6	Launceston International; Launceston, Australia; Hard $60,000; Singles – Doubles	(United States) Jamie Loeb; 7–6^{(7–4)}, 6–3	(Slovenia) Tamara Zidanšek	(United States) Asia Muhammad (Czech Republic) Barbora Krejčíková	(China) Han Xinyun (United States) Kristie Ahn (United Kingdom) Katy Dunne (Australia) Jaimee Fourlis
February 6	Launceston International; Launceston, Australia; Hard $60,000; Singles – Doubles	(Australia) Monique Adamczak (United States) Nicole Melichar; 6–1, 6–2	(Italy) Georgia Brescia (Slovenia) Tamara Zidanšek	(United States) Asia Muhammad (Czech Republic) Barbora Krejčíková	(China) Han Xinyun (United States) Kristie Ahn (United Kingdom) Katy Dunne (Australia) Jaimee Fourlis
February 6	Sharm El Sheikh, Egypt; Hard $15,000; Singles and doubles draws	(Romania) Ioana Diana Pietroiu; 7–6^{(7–2)}, 6–7^{(2–7)}, 6–1	(Russia) Anastasia Pribylova	(Russia) Anna Morgina (Germany) Sarah-Rebecca Sekulic	(Germany) Julyette Steur (Sweden) Linnéa Malmqvist (Italy) Alice Matteucci (Sweden) Brenda Njuki
February 6	Sharm El Sheikh, Egypt; Hard $15,000; Singles and doubles draws	(Belgium) Magali Kempen (United States) Shelby Talcott; 7–6^{(7–5)}, 6–2	(Sweden) Brenda Njuki (Austria) Marlies Szupper	(Russia) Anna Morgina (Germany) Sarah-Rebecca Sekulic	(Germany) Julyette Steur (Sweden) Linnéa Malmqvist (Italy) Alice Matteucci (Sweden) Brenda Njuki
February 6	Trnava, Slovakia; Hard (indoor) $15,000; Singles and doubles draws	(Czech Republic) Pernilla Mendesová; 6–2, 6–7^{(2–7)}, 7–6^{(7–4)}	(Slovakia) Michaela Hončová	(Czech Republic) Vendula Žovincová (Slovakia) Lenka Juríková	(Slovakia) Chantal Škamlová (Slovakia) Vivien Juhászová (Italy) Alberta Brianti (Czech Republic) Tereza Procházková
February 6	Trnava, Slovakia; Hard (indoor) $15,000; Singles and doubles draws	(Germany) Vivian Heisen (Russia) Margarita Lazareva; 4–6, 6–4, [10–7]	(Slovakia) Sandra Jamrichová (Slovakia) Vivien Juhászová	(Czech Republic) Vendula Žovincová (Slovakia) Lenka Juríková	(Slovakia) Chantal Škamlová (Slovakia) Vivien Juhászová (Italy) Alberta Brianti (Czech Republic) Tereza Procházková
February 6	Manacor, Spain; Clay $15,000; Singles and doubles draws	(Australia) Isabelle Wallace; 6–3, 7–6^{(7–5)}	(Spain) María Teresa Torró Flor	(Belgium) Elyne Boeykens (Ukraine) Anastasia Zarytska	(Spain) Júlia Payola (Ukraine) Sofiya Kovalets (Spain) Guiomar Maristany (Cambodia) Andrea Ka
February 6	Manacor, Spain; Clay $15,000; Singles and doubles draws	(United States) Lauren Embree (Chile) Alexa Guarachi; 6–1, 7–5	(United States) Jaeda Daniel (United States) Quinn Gleason	(Belgium) Elyne Boeykens (Ukraine) Anastasia Zarytska	(Spain) Júlia Payola (Ukraine) Sofiya Kovalets (Spain) Guiomar Maristany (Cambodia) Andrea Ka
February 6	Hammamet, Tunisia; Clay $15,000; Singles and doubles draws	(Spain) Georgina García Pérez; 7–5, 6–2	(Switzerland) Jil Teichmann	(France) Margot Yerolymos (Russia) Vasilisa Aponasenko	(Egypt) Sandra Samir (Russia) Yana Sizikova (Belarus) Sviatlana Pirazhenka (United States) Anastasia Nefedova
February 6	Hammamet, Tunisia; Clay $15,000; Singles and doubles draws	(Italy) Giorgia Marchetti (Italy) Angelica Moratelli; 2–6, 6–3, [10–8]	(Chinese Taipei) Hsu Chieh-yu (France) Victoria Muntean	(France) Margot Yerolymos (Russia) Vasilisa Aponasenko	(Egypt) Sandra Samir (Russia) Yana Sizikova (Belarus) Sviatlana Pirazhenka (United States) Anastasia Nefedova
February 6	Antalya, Turkey; Clay $15,000; Singles and doubles draws	(Bulgaria) Dia Evtimova; Walkover	(Russia) Valentyna Ivakhnenko	(Romania) Cristina Ene (Turkey) Başak Eraydın	(Switzerland) Karin Kennel (Czech Republic) Magdaléna Pantůčková (Slovenia) Nastja Kolar (Belgium) Eliessa Vanlangendonck
February 6	Antalya, Turkey; Clay $15,000; Singles and doubles draws	(Turkey) Başak Eraydın (Russia) Valentyna Ivakhnenko; 7–6^{(8–6)}, 6–2	(Switzerland) Karin Kennel (Slovenia) Nastja Kolar	(Romania) Cristina Ene (Turkey) Başak Eraydın	(Switzerland) Karin Kennel (Czech Republic) Magdaléna Pantůčková (Slovenia) Nastja Kolar (Belgium) Eliessa Vanlangendonck
February 6	Edgbaston, United Kingdom; Hard (indoor) $15,000; Singles and doubles draws	(France) Manon Arcangioli; 7–6^{(7–4)}, 6–1	(Hungary) Panna Udvardy	(Belgium) Marie Benoît (United States) Ronit Yurovsky	(Belgium) Klaartje Liebens (Italy) Claudia Giovine (France) Harmony Tan (Switzerland) Tess Sugnaux
February 6	Edgbaston, United Kingdom; Hard (indoor) $15,000; Singles and doubles draws	(United Kingdom) Sarah Beth Grey (United Kingdom) Olivia Nicholls; 6–3, 5–7, [10–7]	(Norway) Melanie Stokke (Germany) Julia Wachaczyk	(Belgium) Marie Benoît (United States) Ronit Yurovsky	(Belgium) Klaartje Liebens (Italy) Claudia Giovine (France) Harmony Tan (Switzerland) Tess Sugnaux
February 13	Perth, Australia; Hard $25,000; Singles and doubles draws	(Czech Republic) Marie Bouzková; 1–6, 6–3, 6–2	(Czech Republic) Markéta Vondroušová	(Slovakia) Viktória Kužmová (Slovenia) Tamara Zidanšek	(Czech Republic) Barbora Krejčíková (Ukraine) Katarina Zavatska (Australia) Priscilla Hon (South Korea) Han Na-lae
February 13	Perth, Australia; Hard $25,000; Singles and doubles draws	(Japan) Junri Namigata (Japan) Riko Sawayanagi; 7–6^{(7–5)}, 4–6, [11–9]	(Romania) Irina Bara (India) Prarthana Thombare	(Slovakia) Viktória Kužmová (Slovenia) Tamara Zidanšek	(Czech Republic) Barbora Krejčíková (Ukraine) Katarina Zavatska (Australia) Priscilla Hon (South Korea) Han Na-lae
February 13	Altenkirchen, Germany; Carpet (indoor) $25,000; Singles and doubles draws	(Netherlands) Bibiane Schoofs; 7–5, 7–5	(Netherlands) Quirine Lemoine	(Slovakia) Magdaléna Rybáriková (Russia) Anna Kalinskaya	(Slovenia) Dalila Jakupović (Czech Republic) Jesika Malečková (Germany) Vivian Heisen (United Kingdom) Tara Moore
February 13	Altenkirchen, Germany; Carpet (indoor) $25,000; Singles and doubles draws	(Romania) Alexandra Cadanțu (Sweden) Cornelia Lister; 6–2, 3–6, [11–9]	(United Kingdom) Tara Moore (Switzerland) Conny Perrin	(Slovakia) Magdaléna Rybáriková (Russia) Anna Kalinskaya	(Slovenia) Dalila Jakupović (Czech Republic) Jesika Malečková (Germany) Vivian Heisen (United Kingdom) Tara Moore
February 13	Surprise, United States; Hard $25,000; Singles and doubles draws	(United States) Caroline Dolehide; 6–3, 6–1	(United States) Danielle Lao	(Bulgaria) Sesil Karatantcheva (Colombia) Mariana Duque	(Romania) Jaqueline Cristian (Liechtenstein) Kathinka von Deichmann (Japan) Mayo Hibi (Canada) Bianca Andreescu
February 13	Surprise, United States; Hard $25,000; Singles and doubles draws	(Colombia) Mariana Duque (Argentina) Nadia Podoroska; 4–6, 6–0, [10–5]	(United States) Usue Maitane Arconada (United States) Sofia Kenin	(Bulgaria) Sesil Karatantcheva (Colombia) Mariana Duque	(Romania) Jaqueline Cristian (Liechtenstein) Kathinka von Deichmann (Japan) Mayo Hibi (Canada) Bianca Andreescu
February 13	Nanjing, China; Hard $15,000; Singles and doubles draws	(China) Xun Fangying; 6–4, 6–4	(Japan) Ayaka Okuno	(China) Guo Hanyu (China) Kang Jiaqi	(China) Liu Chang (China) Tang Haochen (Italy) Cristiana Ferrando (China) Sun Ziyue
February 13	Nanjing, China; Hard $15,000; Singles and doubles draws	(China) Guo Shanshan (China) Jiang Xinyu; 7–5, 7–5	(Thailand) Nudnida Luangnam (China) Ye Qiuyu	(China) Guo Hanyu (China) Kang Jiaqi	(China) Liu Chang (China) Tang Haochen (Italy) Cristiana Ferrando (China) Sun Ziyue
February 13	Sharm El Sheikh, Egypt; Hard $15,000; Singles and doubles draws	(Germany) Sarah-Rebecca Sekulic; 6–2, 6–4	(United Kingdom) Emily Webley-Smith	(Spain) Nuria Párrizas Díaz (United States) Shelby Talcott	(Romania) Ioana Diana Pietroiu (Belgium) Magali Kempen (Italy) Alice Matteucci (Belgium) Britt Geukens
February 13	Sharm El Sheikh, Egypt; Hard $15,000; Singles and doubles draws	(Belgium) Britt Geukens (Belgium) Magali Kempen; 6–3, 2–6, [10–7]	(Romania) Elena Bogdan (Romania) Miriam Bianca Bulgaru	(Spain) Nuria Párrizas Díaz (United States) Shelby Talcott	(Romania) Ioana Diana Pietroiu (Belgium) Magali Kempen (Italy) Alice Matteucci (Belgium) Britt Geukens
February 13	Bergamo, Italy; Clay (indoor) $15,000; Singles and doubles draws	(Poland) Iga Świątek; 6–4, 3–6, 6–3	(Italy) Martina Di Giuseppe	(Italy) Tatiana Pieri (Romania) Oana Georgeta Simion	(Switzerland) Chiara Grimm (Slovakia) Chantal Škamlová (Italy) Giulia Gatto-Monticone (Belgium) Hélène Scholsen
February 13	Bergamo, Italy; Clay (indoor) $15,000; Singles and doubles draws	(Italy) Tatiana Pieri (Italy) Lucrezia Stefanini; 3–6, 6–3, [10–6]	(Italy) Martina Colmegna (Switzerland) Ylena In-Albon	(Italy) Tatiana Pieri (Romania) Oana Georgeta Simion	(Switzerland) Chiara Grimm (Slovakia) Chantal Škamlová (Italy) Giulia Gatto-Monticone (Belgium) Hélène Scholsen
February 13	Manacor, Spain; Clay $15,000; Singles and doubles draws	(Spain) María Teresa Torró Flor; 6–4, 6–2	(Ukraine) Anastasia Zarytska	(France) Margot Yerolymos (Spain) Yvonne Cavallé Reimers	(Romania) Daiana Negreanu (Spain) Guiomar Maristany (Australia) Isabelle Wallace (Spain) Noelia Bouzó Zanotti
February 13	Manacor, Spain; Clay $15,000; Singles and doubles draws	(Spain) Olga Sáez Larra (Spain) María Teresa Torró Flor; 6–3, 6–2	(Spain) Yvonne Cavallé Reimers (Ecuador) Charlotte Römer	(France) Margot Yerolymos (Spain) Yvonne Cavallé Reimers	(Romania) Daiana Negreanu (Spain) Guiomar Maristany (Australia) Isabelle Wallace (Spain) Noelia Bouzó Zanotti
February 13	Hammamet, Tunisia; Clay $15,000; Singles and doubles draws	(Austria) Julia Grabher; 6–7^{(5–7)}, 6–2, 6–2	(Brazil) Laura Pigossi	(Egypt) Sandra Samir (Kazakhstan) Kamila Kerimbayeva	(Spain) Georgina García Pérez (United States) Jessica Ho (Belarus) Sviatlana Pirazhenka (Italy) Angelica Moratelli
February 13	Hammamet, Tunisia; Clay $15,000; Singles and doubles draws	(Slovakia) Vivien Juhászová (Kazakhstan) Kamila Kerimbayeva; 3–6, 6–4, [10–8]	(Greece) Eleni Kordolaimi (Belarus) Sviatlana Pirazhenka	(Egypt) Sandra Samir (Kazakhstan) Kamila Kerimbayeva	(Spain) Georgina García Pérez (United States) Jessica Ho (Belarus) Sviatlana Pirazhenka (Italy) Angelica Moratelli
February 13	Antalya, Turkey; Clay $15,000; Singles and doubles draws	(Serbia) Dejana Radanović; 6–4, 7–6^{(7–1)}	(Turkey) Başak Eraydın	(Romania) Cristina Dinu (Turkey) Ayla Aksu	(Ukraine) Anastasiya Vasylyeva (Romania) Cristina Ene (Bulgaria) Ani Vangelova (Czech Republic) Magdaléna Pantůčková
February 13	Antalya, Turkey; Clay $15,000; Singles and doubles draws	(Turkey) Başak Eraydın (Switzerland) Karin Kennel; 6–3, 2–6, [10–5]	(Romania) Cristina Dinu (Romania) Cristina Ene	(Romania) Cristina Dinu (Turkey) Ayla Aksu	(Ukraine) Anastasiya Vasylyeva (Romania) Cristina Ene (Bulgaria) Ani Vangelova (Czech Republic) Magdaléna Pantůčková
February 13	Wirral, United Kingdom; Hard (indoor) $15,000; Singles and doubles draws	(United Kingdom) Maia Lumsden; 6–4, 6–1	(Poland) Maja Chwalińska	(France) Harmony Tan (Germany) Julia Wachaczyk	(United States) Emina Bektas (Switzerland) Nina Stadler (Slovakia) Kristína Schmiedlová (Denmark) Karen Barritza
February 13	Wirral, United Kingdom; Hard (indoor) $15,000; Singles and doubles draws	(Poland) Maja Chwalińska (Japan) Miyabi Inoue; 6–4, 6–4	(United States) Emina Bektas (United States) Ronit Yurovsky	(France) Harmony Tan (Germany) Julia Wachaczyk	(United States) Emina Bektas (Switzerland) Nina Stadler (Slovakia) Kristína Schmiedlová (Denmark) Karen Barritza
February 20	Perth, Australia; Hard $25,000; Singles and doubles draws	(Australia) Destanee Aiava; 6–1, 6–1	(Slovakia) Viktória Kužmová	(Croatia) Tereza Mrdeža (Australia) Priscilla Hon	(Thailand) Varatchaya Wongteanchai (France) Tessah Andrianjafitrimo (Papua New Guinea) Abigail Tere-Apisah (Czech Republic) Markéta Vondroušová
February 20	Perth, Australia; Hard $25,000; Singles and doubles draws	(Japan) Junri Namigata (Japan) Riko Sawayanagi; 4–6, 7–5, [10–6]	(Australia) Tammi Patterson (Australia) Olivia Rogowska	(Croatia) Tereza Mrdeža (Australia) Priscilla Hon	(Thailand) Varatchaya Wongteanchai (France) Tessah Andrianjafitrimo (Papua New Guinea) Abigail Tere-Apisah (Czech Republic) Markéta Vondroušová
February 20	Moscow, Russia; Hard (indoor) $25,000; Singles and doubles draws	(Russia) Polina Monova; 6–1, 6–1	(Russia) Alina Silich	(Belgium) An-Sophie Mestach (Slovakia) Anna Karolína Schmiedlová	(Russia) Elena Rybakina (Russia) Vitalia Diatchenko (Russia) Daria Kruzhkova (Ukraine) Dayana Yastremska
February 20	Moscow, Russia; Hard (indoor) $25,000; Singles and doubles draws	(Belarus) Vera Lapko (Ukraine) Dayana Yastremska; 7–5, 6–3	(Netherlands) Bibiane Schoofs (Russia) Ekaterina Yashina	(Belgium) An-Sophie Mestach (Slovakia) Anna Karolína Schmiedlová	(Russia) Elena Rybakina (Russia) Vitalia Diatchenko (Russia) Daria Kruzhkova (Ukraine) Dayana Yastremska
February 20	Rancho Santa Fe, United States; Hard $25,000; Singles and doubles draws	(Canada) Bianca Andreescu; 6–4, 6–1	(United States) Kayla Day	(Canada) Katherine Sebov (United States) Sofia Kenin	(Japan) Mayo Hibi (United States) Maria Sanchez (United States) Caroline Dolehide (Portugal) Michelle Larcher de Brito
February 20	Rancho Santa Fe, United States; Hard $25,000; Singles and doubles draws	(United States) Kayla Day (United States) Caroline Dolehide; 6–3, 1–6, [10–7]	(Ukraine) Anhelina Kalinina (United States) Chiara Scholl	(Canada) Katherine Sebov (United States) Sofia Kenin	(Japan) Mayo Hibi (United States) Maria Sanchez (United States) Caroline Dolehide (Portugal) Michelle Larcher de Brito
February 20	Nanjing, China; Hard $15,000; Singles and doubles draws	(Italy) Cristiana Ferrando; 6–0, 6–2	(China) Guo Hanyu	(China) Guo Shanshan (China) Tang Haochen	(China) Zhang Ying (China) Xun Fangying (China) Chen Jiahui (China) Kang Jiaqi
February 20	Nanjing, China; Hard $15,000; Singles and doubles draws	(China) Li Yihong (China) Zhang Ying; 5–7, 6–3, [10–3]	(China) Guo Hanyu (China) Tang Haochen	(China) Guo Shanshan (China) Tang Haochen	(China) Zhang Ying (China) Xun Fangying (China) Chen Jiahui (China) Kang Jiaqi
February 20	Sharm El Sheikh, Egypt; Hard $15,000; Singles and doubles draws	(United Kingdom) Emily Webley-Smith; 6–3, 6–4	(Bulgaria) Julia Terziyska	(Croatia) Ana Vrljić (Belarus) Yuliya Hatouka	(Spain) Nuria Párrizas Díaz (United States) Shelby Talcott (Belgium) Britt Geukens (Turkey) Pemra Özgen
February 20	Sharm El Sheikh, Egypt; Hard $15,000; Singles and doubles draws	(Ukraine) Veronika Kapshay (Bulgaria) Julia Terziyska; 6–3, 2–6, [10–7]	(Turkey) Pemra Özgen (Croatia) Ana Vrljić	(Croatia) Ana Vrljić (Belarus) Yuliya Hatouka	(Spain) Nuria Párrizas Díaz (United States) Shelby Talcott (Belgium) Britt Geukens (Turkey) Pemra Özgen
February 20	Palma Nova, Spain; Clay $15,000; Singles and doubles draws	(Spain) Olga Sáez Larra; 6–4, 6–7^{(3–7)}, 6–2	(Spain) Irene Burillo Escorihuela	(Germany) Katharina Gerlach (Italy) Giulia Gatto-Monticone	(United States) Lauren Embree (Italy) Martina Colmegna (Spain) Eva Guerrero Álvarez (Poland) Magdalena Fręch
February 20	Palma Nova, Spain; Clay $15,000; Singles and doubles draws	(Germany) Katharina Gerlach (Germany) Katharina Hobgarski; 6–4, 6–4	(Spain) Yvonne Cavallé Reimers (Spain) Olga Sáez Larra	(Germany) Katharina Gerlach (Italy) Giulia Gatto-Monticone	(United States) Lauren Embree (Italy) Martina Colmegna (Spain) Eva Guerrero Álvarez (Poland) Magdalena Fręch
February 20	Hammamet, Tunisia; Clay $15,000; Singles and doubles draws	(Chinese Taipei) Hsu Chieh-yu; 6–2, 2–6, 6–1	(Egypt) Sandra Samir	(Italy) Nastassja Burnett (Austria) Julia Grabher	(Italy) Lucrezia Stefanini (Kazakhstan) Kamila Kerimbayeva (Sweden) Mirjam Björklund (Italy) Giorgia Marchetti
February 20	Hammamet, Tunisia; Clay $15,000; Singles and doubles draws	(Chinese Taipei) Hsu Chieh-yu (Egypt) Sandra Samir; 6–2, 7–5	(Sweden) Ida Jarlskog (Sweden) Julia Rosenqvist	(Italy) Nastassja Burnett (Austria) Julia Grabher	(Italy) Lucrezia Stefanini (Kazakhstan) Kamila Kerimbayeva (Sweden) Mirjam Björklund (Italy) Giorgia Marchetti
February 20	Antalya, Turkey; Clay $15,000; Singles and doubles draws	(Romania) Cristina Dinu; 6–3, 6–3	(Serbia) Dejana Radanović	(Turkey) Başak Eraydın (Turkey) Ayla Aksu	(Ukraine) Anastasiya Vasylyeva (Austria) Pia König (Georgia (country)) Ekaterine Gorgodze (Russia) Victoria Kan
February 20	Antalya, Turkey; Clay $15,000; Singles and doubles draws	(Turkey) Ayla Aksu (Georgia (country)) Ekaterine Gorgodze; 6–3, 6–1	(Turkey) Başak Eraydın (Switzerland) Karin Kennel	(Turkey) Başak Eraydın (Turkey) Ayla Aksu	(Ukraine) Anastasiya Vasylyeva (Austria) Pia König (Georgia (country)) Ekaterine Gorgodze (Russia) Victoria Kan
February 27	Clare, Australia; Hard $25,000; Singles and doubles draws	(Brazil) Beatriz Haddad Maia; 6–2, 6–2	(Czech Republic) Markéta Vondroušová	(Australia) Destanee Aiava (France) Tessah Andrianjafitrimo	(United States) Catherine Harrison (Slovakia) Viktória Kužmová (United Kingdom) Katie Boulter (France) Shérazad Reix
February 27	Clare, Australia; Hard $25,000; Singles and doubles draws	(Brazil) Beatriz Haddad Maia (Australia) Genevieve Lorbergs; 6–4, 6–3	(Australia) Alison Bai (Japan) Erika Sema	(Australia) Destanee Aiava (France) Tessah Andrianjafitrimo	(United States) Catherine Harrison (Slovakia) Viktória Kužmová (United Kingdom) Katie Boulter (France) Shérazad Reix
February 27	Curitiba, Brazil; Clay $25,000; Singles and doubles draws	(Russia) Anastasia Potapova; 6–7^{(7–9)}, 7–5, 6–2	(United States) Amanda Anisimova	(Russia) Irina Khromacheva (Switzerland) Jil Teichmann	(Spain) María Teresa Torró Flor (Chile) Daniela Seguel (Switzerland) Conny Perrin (Turkey) Berfu Cengiz
February 27	Curitiba, Brazil; Clay $25,000; Singles and doubles draws	(Brazil) Gabriela Cé (Venezuela) Andrea Gámiz; 4–6, 6–2, [10–2]	(Brazil) Laura Pigossi (Switzerland) Jil Teichmann	(Russia) Irina Khromacheva (Switzerland) Jil Teichmann	(Spain) María Teresa Torró Flor (Chile) Daniela Seguel (Switzerland) Conny Perrin (Turkey) Berfu Cengiz
February 27	Nanjing, China; Hard $15,000; Singles and doubles draws	(China) Gao Xinyu; 6–4, 6–3	(China) Tang Haochen	(China) Tian Ran (China) Xun Fangying	(China) Ren Jiaqi (China) Chen Jiahui (China) Guo Hanyu (China) Kang Jiaqi
February 27	Nanjing, China; Hard $15,000; Singles and doubles draws	(China) Sun Xuliu (China) Sun Ziyue; 6–3, 6–1	(Russia) Angelina Gabueva (Russia) Olga Puchkova	(China) Tian Ran (China) Xun Fangying	(China) Ren Jiaqi (China) Chen Jiahui (China) Guo Hanyu (China) Kang Jiaqi
February 27	Sharm El Sheikh, Egypt; Hard $15,000; Singles and doubles draws	(United Kingdom) Katie Swan; 6–3, 6–1	(Turkey) Pemra Özgen	(Germany) Julia Wachaczyk (Bulgaria) Julia Terziyska	(Croatia) Ana Vrljić (Ukraine) Veronika Kapshay (Belarus) Yuliya Hatouka (Belgium) Hélène Scholsen
February 27	Sharm El Sheikh, Egypt; Hard $15,000; Singles and doubles draws	(Ukraine) Veronika Kapshay (Germany) Julia Wachaczyk; 6–4, 2–6, [10–5]	(Turkey) Pemra Özgen (Croatia) Ana Vrljić	(Germany) Julia Wachaczyk (Bulgaria) Julia Terziyska	(Croatia) Ana Vrljić (Ukraine) Veronika Kapshay (Belarus) Yuliya Hatouka (Belgium) Hélène Scholsen
February 27	Mâcon, France; Hard (indoor) $15,000; Singles and doubles draws	(France) Mallaurie Noël; 7–5, 6–2	(Italy) Ludmilla Samsonova	(France) Elixane Lechemia (France) Gaëlle Desperrier	(Latvia) Diāna Marcinkēviča (Russia) Ekaterina Kazionova (Italy) Alice Matteucci (Italy) Camilla Rosatello
February 27	Mâcon, France; Hard (indoor) $15,000; Singles and doubles draws	(Belarus) Ilona Kremen (Latvia) Diāna Marcinkēviča; 6–7^{(5–7)}, 7–6^{(7–1)}, [10–4]	(Italy) Alice Matteucci (Italy) Camilla Rosatello	(France) Elixane Lechemia (France) Gaëlle Desperrier	(Latvia) Diāna Marcinkēviča (Russia) Ekaterina Kazionova (Italy) Alice Matteucci (Italy) Camilla Rosatello
February 27	Gwalior, India; Hard $15,000; Singles and doubles draws	(India) Zeel Desai; 6–3, 7–5	(India) Mahak Jain	(Oman) Fatma Al-Nabhani (Switzerland) Lulu Radovcic	(India) Sai Samhitha Chamarthi (India) Bhuvana Kalva (India) Natasha Palha (India) Riya Bhatia
February 27	Gwalior, India; Hard $15,000; Singles and doubles draws	(India) Natasha Palha (India) Rishika Sunkara; 6–4, 6–2	(India) Riya Bhatia (India) Shweta Chandra Rana	(Oman) Fatma Al-Nabhani (Switzerland) Lulu Radovcic	(India) Sai Samhitha Chamarthi (India) Bhuvana Kalva (India) Natasha Palha (India) Riya Bhatia
February 27	Palma Nova, Spain; Clay $15,000; Singles and doubles draws	(Australia) Isabelle Wallace; 7–6^{(7–4)}, 6–0	(Germany) Katharina Hobgarski	(Spain) Olga Sáez Larra (United States) Yuki Kristina Chiang	(Spain) Yvonne Cavallé Reimers (Spain) Irene Burillo Escorihuela (Belgium) Kimberley Zimmermann (India) Snehadevi Reddy
February 27	Palma Nova, Spain; Clay $15,000; Singles and doubles draws	(Spain) Irene Burillo Escorihuela (Russia) Ksenija Sharifova; 7–5, 6–3	(Portugal) Inês Murta (Australia) Isabelle Wallace	(Spain) Olga Sáez Larra (United States) Yuki Kristina Chiang	(Spain) Yvonne Cavallé Reimers (Spain) Irene Burillo Escorihuela (Belgium) Kimberley Zimmermann (India) Snehadevi Reddy
February 27	Hammamet, Tunisia; Clay $15,000; Singles and doubles draws	(Italy) Camilla Scala; 2–6, 7–5, 6–2	(Slovenia) Kaja Juvan	(Italy) Federica Arcidiacono (Slovakia) Lenka Juríková	(Italy) Gaia Sanesi (Italy) Nastassja Burnett (Greece) Eleni Kordolaimi (Sweden) Julia Rosenqvist
February 27	Hammamet, Tunisia; Clay $15,000; Singles and doubles draws	(Italy) Natasha Piludu (Italy) Gaia Sanesi; 6–3, 6–2	(Netherlands) Dominique Karregat (Poland) Sandra Zaniewska	(Italy) Federica Arcidiacono (Slovakia) Lenka Juríková	(Italy) Gaia Sanesi (Italy) Nastassja Burnett (Greece) Eleni Kordolaimi (Sweden) Julia Rosenqvist
February 27	Antalya, Turkey; Clay $15,000; Singles and doubles draws	(Romania) Georgia Andreea Crăciun; 6–3, 6–2	(Austria) Pia König	(Ukraine) Alona Fomina (Russia) Anastasia Frolova	(Ukraine) Alona Bondarenko (Luxembourg) Eléonora Molinaro (China) Du Zhima (Colombia) María Fernanda Herazo
February 27	Antalya, Turkey; Clay $15,000; Singles and doubles draws	(Romania) Georgia Andreea Crăciun (Romania) Ilona Georgiana Ghioroaie; 6–1, 6–4	(Russia) Anastasia Frolova (Russia) Alena Tarasova	(Ukraine) Alona Fomina (Russia) Anastasia Frolova	(Ukraine) Alona Bondarenko (Luxembourg) Eléonora Molinaro (China) Du Zhima (Colombia) María Fernanda Herazo

=== March ===
Week of	Tournament	Winner	Runners-up	Semifinalists	Quarterfinalists
March 6	Zhuhai Open; Zhuhai, China; Hard $60,000; Singles – Doubles	(Czech Republic) Denisa Allertová; 6–3, 2–6, 6–4	(China) Zheng Saisai	(Belgium) Maryna Zanevska (Tunisia) Ons Jabeur	(Chinese Taipei) Hsieh Su-wei (Netherlands) Arantxa Rus (China) Gao Xinyu (Chinese Taipei) Chang Kai-chen
March 6	Zhuhai Open; Zhuhai, China; Hard $60,000; Singles – Doubles	(Netherlands) Lesley Kerkhove (Belarus) Lidziya Marozava; 6–4, 6–2	(Ukraine) Lyudmyla Kichenok (Ukraine) Nadiia Kichenok	(Belgium) Maryna Zanevska (Tunisia) Ons Jabeur	(Chinese Taipei) Hsieh Su-wei (Netherlands) Arantxa Rus (China) Gao Xinyu (Chinese Taipei) Chang Kai-chen
March 6	Mildura, Australia; Grass $25,000; Singles and doubles draws	(Slovakia) Viktória Kužmová; 6–2, 6–4	(United Kingdom) Katie Boulter	(Thailand) Noppawan Lertcheewakarn (United States) Kristie Ahn	(United Kingdom) Gabriella Taylor (Japan) Ayano Shimizu (Papua New Guinea) Abigail Tere-Apisah (France) Shérazad Reix
March 6	Mildura, Australia; Grass $25,000; Singles and doubles draws	(Thailand) Noppawan Lertcheewakarn (China) Lu Jiajing; 6–4, 1–6, [10–8]	(France) Tessah Andrianjafitrimo (France) Shérazad Reix	(Thailand) Noppawan Lertcheewakarn (United States) Kristie Ahn	(United Kingdom) Gabriella Taylor (Japan) Ayano Shimizu (Papua New Guinea) Abigail Tere-Apisah (France) Shérazad Reix
March 6	São Paulo, Brazil; Clay $25,000; Singles and doubles draws	(Russia) Irina Khromacheva; 6–2, 6–1	(Brazil) Laura Pigossi	(Spain) María Teresa Torró Flor (United Kingdom) Amanda Carreras	(Brazil) Gabriela Cé (Spain) Paula Badosa Gibert (Switzerland) Conny Perrin (Hungary) Vanda Lukács
March 6	São Paulo, Brazil; Clay $25,000; Singles and doubles draws	(Argentina) Catalina Pella (Chile) Daniela Seguel; 7–5, 3–6, [10–5]	(Brazil) Gabriela Cé (Venezuela) Andrea Gámiz	(Spain) María Teresa Torró Flor (United Kingdom) Amanda Carreras	(Brazil) Gabriela Cé (Spain) Paula Badosa Gibert (Switzerland) Conny Perrin (Hungary) Vanda Lukács
March 6	Keio Challenger; Yokohama, Japan; Hard $25,000; Singles and doubles draws	(Japan) Akiko Omae; 7–5, 6–2	(Japan) Mayo Hibi	(Japan) Miyu Kato (Japan) Junri Namigata	(Japan) Erika Sema (Japan) Megumi Nishimoto (Kazakhstan) Galina Voskoboeva (Chinese Taipei) Lee Ya-hsuan
March 6	Keio Challenger; Yokohama, Japan; Hard $25,000; Singles and doubles draws	(Japan) Ayaka Okuno (Japan) Erika Sema; 6–4, 6–4	(Japan) Kanako Morisaki (Japan) Minori Yonehara	(Japan) Miyu Kato (Japan) Junri Namigata	(Japan) Erika Sema (Japan) Megumi Nishimoto (Kazakhstan) Galina Voskoboeva (Chinese Taipei) Lee Ya-hsuan
March 6	Sharm El Sheikh, Egypt; Hard $15,000; Singles and doubles draws	(United Kingdom) Katie Swan; 6–4, 7–5	(Germany) Julia Wachaczyk	(Russia) Polina Monova (Belgium) Marie Benoît	(Netherlands) Nina Kruijer (India) Sai Samhitha Chamarthi (Ukraine) Valeriya Strakhova (Moldova) Anastasia Vdovenco
March 6	Sharm El Sheikh, Egypt; Hard $15,000; Singles and doubles draws	(Russia) Olga Doroshina (Russia) Polina Monova; Walkover	(Slovakia) Tereza Mihalíková (Bulgaria) Julia Terziyska	(Russia) Polina Monova (Belgium) Marie Benoît	(Netherlands) Nina Kruijer (India) Sai Samhitha Chamarthi (Ukraine) Valeriya Strakhova (Moldova) Anastasia Vdovenco
March 6	Amiens, France; Clay (indoor) $15,000; Singles and doubles draws	(France) Audrey Albié; 6–3, 6–4	(Italy) Camilla Rosatello	(France) Léa Tholey (Latvia) Diāna Marcinkēviča	(France) Clothilde de Bernardi (Germany) Tayisiya Morderger (Belgium) Déborah Kerfs (France) Giulia Morlet
March 6	Amiens, France; Clay (indoor) $15,000; Singles and doubles draws	(Italy) Camilla Rosatello (Norway) Melanie Stokke; 6–3, 6–0	(Belarus) Ilona Kremen (Latvia) Diāna Marcinkēviča	(France) Léa Tholey (Latvia) Diāna Marcinkēviča	(France) Clothilde de Bernardi (Germany) Tayisiya Morderger (Belgium) Déborah Kerfs (France) Giulia Morlet
March 6	Heraklion, Greece; Clay $15,000; Singles and doubles draws	(Serbia) Dejana Radanović; 7–5, 6–3	(Italy) Giulia Gatto-Monticone	(Italy) Lucrezia Stefanini (Slovakia) Michaela Hončová	(Romania) Raluca Georgiana Șerban (Romania) Oana Georgeta Simion (Romania) Cristina Ene (Moldova) Alexandra Perper
March 6	Heraklion, Greece; Clay $15,000; Singles and doubles draws	(Slovakia) Michaela Hončová (Italy) Francesca Palmigiano; 6–4, 6–3	(Romania) Oana Georgeta Simion (Romania) Raluca Georgiana Șerban	(Italy) Lucrezia Stefanini (Slovakia) Michaela Hončová	(Romania) Raluca Georgiana Șerban (Romania) Oana Georgeta Simion (Romania) Cristina Ene (Moldova) Alexandra Perper
March 6	Solarino, Italy; Carpet $15,000; Singles and doubles draws	(Czech Republic) Petra Krejsová; 6–2, 5–7, 6–0	(Slovakia) Natália Vajdová	(Spain) Georgina García Pérez (Russia) Marta Paigina	(Italy) Dalila Spiteri (Italy) Tatiana Pieri (Italy) Anna Remondina (Italy) Stefania Rubini
March 6	Solarino, Italy; Carpet $15,000; Singles and doubles draws	(Romania) Laura-Ioana Andrei (Czech Republic) Petra Krejsová; 6−0, 6−3	(Switzerland) Ylena In-Albon (Italy) Tatiana Pieri	(Spain) Georgina García Pérez (Russia) Marta Paigina	(Italy) Dalila Spiteri (Italy) Tatiana Pieri (Italy) Anna Remondina (Italy) Stefania Rubini
March 6	Hammamet, Tunisia; Clay $15,000; Singles and doubles draws	(Italy) Camilla Scala; 1–6, 6–3, 6–3	(Poland) Sandra Zaniewska	(Bulgaria) Isabella Shinikova (Italy) Federica Arcidiacono	(Germany) Katharina Gerlach (France) Jade Suvrijn (Croatia) Ani Mijačika (Italy) Natasha Piludu
March 6	Hammamet, Tunisia; Clay $15,000; Singles and doubles draws	(Slovakia) Sandra Jamrichová (Russia) Yulia Kulikova; 7–5, 7–6^{(7–5)}	(Russia) Margarita Lazareva (Bulgaria) Isabella Shinikova	(Bulgaria) Isabella Shinikova (Italy) Federica Arcidiacono	(Germany) Katharina Gerlach (France) Jade Suvrijn (Croatia) Ani Mijačika (Italy) Natasha Piludu
March 6	Antalya, Turkey; Clay $15,000; Singles and doubles draws	(Romania) Andreea Mitu; 6–2, 6–3	(Turkey) Ayla Aksu	(Turkey) Başak Eraydın (Romania) Georgia Andreea Crăciun	(Ukraine) Maryna Chernyshova (Austria) Pia König (Turkey) Melis Sezer (Czech Republic) Karolína Muchová
March 6	Antalya, Turkey; Clay $15,000; Singles and doubles draws	(Russia) Anastasia Frolova (Russia) Alena Tarasova; 7–5, 6–1	(Czech Republic) Barbora Miklová (Czech Republic) Karolína Muchová	(Turkey) Başak Eraydın (Romania) Georgia Andreea Crăciun	(Ukraine) Maryna Chernyshova (Austria) Pia König (Turkey) Melis Sezer (Czech Republic) Karolína Muchová
March 6	Orlando, United States; Clay $15,000; Singles and doubles draws	(Czech Republic) Marie Bouzková; 7–5, 5–7, 6–0	(Mexico) Victoria Rodríguez	(Ukraine) Elizaveta Ianchuk (Colombia) Emiliana Arango	(Chinese Taipei) Hsu Chieh-yu (United States) Sanaz Marand (United States) Quinn Gleason (United States) Chiara Scholl
March 6	Orlando, United States; Clay $15,000; Singles and doubles draws	(United States) Emina Bektas (United States) Sanaz Marand; 6−1, 6−3	(United States) Chiara Scholl (Mexico) Marcela Zacarías	(Ukraine) Elizaveta Ianchuk (Colombia) Emiliana Arango	(Chinese Taipei) Hsu Chieh-yu (United States) Sanaz Marand (United States) Quinn Gleason (United States) Chiara Scholl
March 13	Pingshan Open; Shenzhen, China; Hard $60,000; Singles – Doubles	(Russia) Ekaterina Alexandrova; 6–2, 7–5	(Belarus) Aryna Sabalenka	(Russia) Anna Kalinskaya (China) Lu Jingjing	(Chinese Taipei) Hsieh Su-wei (Tunisia) Ons Jabeur (Czech Republic) Denisa Allertová (Belarus) Vera Lapko
March 13	Pingshan Open; Shenzhen, China; Hard $60,000; Singles – Doubles	(Ukraine) Lyudmyla Kichenok (Ukraine) Nadiia Kichenok; 6–4, 6–4	(Japan) Eri Hozumi (Russia) Valeria Savinykh	(Russia) Anna Kalinskaya (China) Lu Jingjing	(Chinese Taipei) Hsieh Su-wei (Tunisia) Ons Jabeur (Czech Republic) Denisa Allertová (Belarus) Vera Lapko
March 13	Sharm El Sheikh, Egypt; Hard $15,000; Singles and doubles draws	(Russia) Polina Monova; 2–6, 7–5, 6–4	(France) Elixane Lechemia	(Russia) Margarita Skryabina (Russia) Olga Doroshina	(Germany) Julia Wachaczyk (Russia) Yana Sizikova (Ukraine) Valeriya Strakhova (Belgium) Marie Benoît
March 13	Sharm El Sheikh, Egypt; Hard $15,000; Singles and doubles draws	(Russia) Olga Doroshina (Russia) Polina Monova; 6–1, 6–1	(Russia) Yana Sizikova (Ukraine) Valeriya Strakhova	(Russia) Margarita Skryabina (Russia) Olga Doroshina	(Germany) Julia Wachaczyk (Russia) Yana Sizikova (Ukraine) Valeriya Strakhova (Belgium) Marie Benoît
March 13	Gonesse, France; Clay (indoor) $15,000; Singles and doubles draws	(Germany) Anna Zaja; 6–3, 2–6, 7–6^{(8–6)}	(France) Priscilla Heise	(France) Marine Partaud (Belgium) Kimberley Zimmermann	(Latvia) Diāna Marcinkēviča (Germany) Lena Rüffer (Switzerland) Chiara Grimm (Germany) Tayisiya Morderger
March 13	Gonesse, France; Clay (indoor) $15,000; Singles and doubles draws	(Belarus) Ilona Kremen (Latvia) Diāna Marcinkēviča; 6–1, 6–4	(Ukraine) Ganna Poznikhirenko (Russia) Ekaterina Yashina	(France) Marine Partaud (Belgium) Kimberley Zimmermann	(Latvia) Diāna Marcinkēviča (Germany) Lena Rüffer (Switzerland) Chiara Grimm (Germany) Tayisiya Morderger
March 13	Heraklion, Greece; Clay $15,000; Singles and doubles draws	(Serbia) Dejana Radanović; 6–4, 7–6^{(7–1)}	(Romania) Raluca Georgiana Șerban	(Moldova) Alexandra Perper (Croatia) Tena Lukas	(United States) Usue Maitane Arconada (Belgium) Michaela Boev (Canada) Charlotte Robillard-Millette (Paraguay) Camila Giangreco Campiz
March 13	Heraklion, Greece; Clay $15,000; Singles and doubles draws	(Romania) Raluca Georgiana Șerban (Romania) Oana Georgeta Simion; 3–6, 7–6^{(7–2)}, [10–2]	(Canada) Charlotte Robillard-Millette (Canada) Carol Zhao	(Moldova) Alexandra Perper (Croatia) Tena Lukas	(United States) Usue Maitane Arconada (Belgium) Michaela Boev (Canada) Charlotte Robillard-Millette (Paraguay) Camila Giangreco Campiz
March 13	Solarino, Italy; Carpet $15,000; Singles and doubles draws	(Russia) Marta Paigina; 6–7^{(4–7)}, 6–3, 6–3	(Czech Republic) Petra Krejsová	(Italy) Stefania Rubini (Italy) Georgia Brescia	(Spain) Georgina García Pérez (Russia) Anastasia Pribylova (Italy) Deborah Chiesa (Bosnia and Herzegovina) Dea Herdželaš
March 13	Solarino, Italy; Carpet $15,000; Singles and doubles draws	(Romania) Laura-Ioana Andrei (Czech Republic) Petra Krejsová; 6–3, 6–2	(Italy) Georgia Brescia (Switzerland) Ylena In-Albon	(Italy) Stefania Rubini (Italy) Georgia Brescia	(Spain) Georgina García Pérez (Russia) Anastasia Pribylova (Italy) Deborah Chiesa (Bosnia and Herzegovina) Dea Herdželaš
March 13	Hammamet, Tunisia; Clay $15,000; Singles and doubles draws	(Slovenia) Nina Potočnik; 6–0, 6–0	(Croatia) Ani Mijačika	(Brazil) Carolina Alves (Romania) Alexandra Dulgheru	(Germany) Katharina Gerlach (Switzerland) Lulu Radovcic (Russia) Margarita Lazareva (France) Jade Suvrjin
March 13	Hammamet, Tunisia; Clay $15,000; Singles and doubles draws	(Uzbekistan) Arina Folts (Slovenia) Nina Potočnik; 6–4, 6–3	(France) Valentine Bacher (France) Emma Léné	(Brazil) Carolina Alves (Romania) Alexandra Dulgheru	(Germany) Katharina Gerlach (Switzerland) Lulu Radovcic (Russia) Margarita Lazareva (France) Jade Suvrjin
March 13	Antalya, Turkey; Clay $15,000; Singles and doubles draws	(Georgia (country)) Sofia Shapatava; 2–6, 7–6^{(7–3)}, 7–6^{(7–5)}	(Turkey) Ayla Aksu	(Russia) Alena Tarasova (Bulgaria) Dia Evtimova	(China) Ni Ma Zhuoma (Russia) Anastasia Frolova (China) Mu Shouna (Ukraine) Sofiya Kovalets
March 13	Antalya, Turkey; Clay $15,000; Singles and doubles draws	(Russia) Anastasia Frolova (Russia) Alena Tarasova; 7–5, 6–1	(Bulgaria) Dia Evtimova (Bosnia and Herzegovina) Jasmina Tinjić	(Russia) Alena Tarasova (Bulgaria) Dia Evtimova	(China) Ni Ma Zhuoma (Russia) Anastasia Frolova (China) Mu Shouna (Ukraine) Sofiya Kovalets
March 13	Tampa, United States; Clay $15,000; Singles and doubles draws	(Portugal) Michelle Larcher de Brito; 6–2, 6–0	(Mexico) Victoria Rodríguez	(Japan) Mari Osaka (Chile) Alexa Guarachi	(Chinese Taipei) Hsu Chieh-yu (Mexico) Renata Zarazúa (United States) Nicole Melichar (United States) Maria Mateas
March 13	Tampa, United States; Clay $15,000; Singles and doubles draws	(Chile) Alexa Guarachi (Chinese Taipei) Hsu Chieh-yu; 6–3, 4–6, [10–4]	(United States) Emina Bektas (United States) Sanaz Marand	(Japan) Mari Osaka (Chile) Alexa Guarachi	(Chinese Taipei) Hsu Chieh-yu (Mexico) Renata Zarazúa (United States) Nicole Melichar (United States) Maria Mateas
March 20	Mornington, Australia; Clay $25,000; Singles and doubles draws	(Australia) Destanee Aiava; 6–2, 4–6, 6–2	(Czech Republic) Barbora Krejčíková	(Australia) Lizette Cabrera (United Kingdom) Gabriella Taylor	(France) Tessah Andrianjafitrimo (Thailand) Varatchaya Wongteanchai (Israel) Julia Glushko (Australia) Olivia Tjandramulia
March 20	Mornington, Australia; Clay $25,000; Singles and doubles draws	(Australia) Priscilla Hon (Hungary) Fanny Stollár; 6–1, 7–5	(Australia) Jessica Moore (Thailand) Varatchaya Wongteanchai	(Australia) Lizette Cabrera (United Kingdom) Gabriella Taylor	(France) Tessah Andrianjafitrimo (Thailand) Varatchaya Wongteanchai (Israel) Julia Glushko (Australia) Olivia Tjandramulia
March 20	Pula, Italy; Clay $25,000; Singles and doubles draws	(Ukraine) Katarina Zavatska; 6–1, 6–3	(France) Chloé Paquet	(France) Fiona Ferro (Canada) Bianca Andreescu	(Spain) Olga Sáez Larra (Bosnia and Herzegovina) Dea Herdželaš (Italy) Martina Trevisan (Turkey) Başak Eraydın
March 20	Pula, Italy; Clay $25,000; Singles and doubles draws	(Russia) Olesya Pervushina (Ukraine) Dayana Yastremska; 6–4, 6–4	(United Kingdom) Tara Moore (Switzerland) Conny Perrin	(France) Fiona Ferro (Canada) Bianca Andreescu	(Spain) Olga Sáez Larra (Bosnia and Herzegovina) Dea Herdželaš (Italy) Martina Trevisan (Turkey) Başak Eraydın
March 20	Sharm El Sheikh, Egypt; Hard $15,000; Singles and doubles draws	(Germany) Julia Wachaczyk; 2–6, 6–3, 6–2	(United Kingdom) Jodie Anna Burrage	(United Kingdom) Suzy Larkin (France) Clémence Fayol	(Austria) Melanie Klaffner (United Kingdom) Emily Webley-Smith (Romania) Elena-Teodora Cadar (France) Caroline Roméo
March 20	Sharm El Sheikh, Egypt; Hard $15,000; Singles and doubles draws	(Slovakia) Tereza Mihalíková (Russia) Anna Morgina; 2–6, 6–4, [10–5]	(China) Li Yuenu (China) Meng Ran	(United Kingdom) Suzy Larkin (France) Clémence Fayol	(Austria) Melanie Klaffner (United Kingdom) Emily Webley-Smith (Romania) Elena-Teodora Cadar (France) Caroline Roméo
March 20	Le Havre, France; Clay (indoor) $15,000; Singles and doubles draws	(France) Marine Partaud; 6–1, 7–5	(France) Priscilla Heise	(Belgium) Kimberley Zimmermann (Ukraine) Ganna Poznikhirenko	(France) Théo Gravouil (Belarus) Ilona Kremen (Romania) Daiana Negreanu (Belgium) Catherine Chantraine
March 20	Le Havre, France; Clay (indoor) $15,000; Singles and doubles draws	(Belgium) Elyne Boeykens (Belgium) Kimberley Zimmermann; 7–6^{(7–5)}, 6–3	(Oman) Fatma Al-Nabhani (Romania) Daiana Negreanu	(Belgium) Kimberley Zimmermann (Ukraine) Ganna Poznikhirenko	(France) Théo Gravouil (Belarus) Ilona Kremen (Romania) Daiana Negreanu (Belgium) Catherine Chantraine
March 20	Heraklion, Greece; Clay $15,000; Singles and doubles draws	(Ukraine) Olga Ianchuk; 6–3, 6–2	(Czech Republic) Miriam Kolodziejová	(Italy) Alberta Brianti (Belgium) Michaela Boev	(Paraguay) Camila Giangreco Campiz (Serbia) Bojana Marinković (Canada) Carol Zhao (Czech Republic) Karolína Novotná
March 20	Heraklion, Greece; Clay $15,000; Singles and doubles draws	(Austria) Mira Antonitsch (India) Karman Kaur Thandi; 6–0, 6–3	(Ukraine) Olga Ianchuk (Greece) Despina Papamichail	(Italy) Alberta Brianti (Belgium) Michaela Boev	(Paraguay) Camila Giangreco Campiz (Serbia) Bojana Marinković (Canada) Carol Zhao (Czech Republic) Karolína Novotná
March 20	Nishitama, Japan; Hard $15,000; Singles and doubles draws	(Germany) Sarah-Rebecca Sekulic; 6–4, 7–5	(Japan) Shiho Akita	(Japan) Momoko Kobori (Japan) Kyōka Okamura	(Japan) Erika Sema (South Korea) Lee So-ra (United States) Tori Kinard (Japan) Haruna Arakawa
March 20	Nishitama, Japan; Hard $15,000; Singles and doubles draws	(Japan) Momoko Kobori (Japan) Kotomi Takahata; 6–1, 6–2	(Japan) Shiho Akita (Japan) Erika Sema	(Japan) Momoko Kobori (Japan) Kyōka Okamura	(Japan) Erika Sema (South Korea) Lee So-ra (United States) Tori Kinard (Japan) Haruna Arakawa
March 20	Óbidos, Portugal; Carpet $15,000; Singles and doubles draws	(France) Harmony Tan; 6–3, 6–7^{(5–7)}, 6–3	(Spain) María José Luque Moreno	(Spain) María Gutiérrez Carrasco (Belgium) Hélène Scholsen	(Germany) Anna Klasen (Italy) Dalila Spiteri (Russia) Yana Sizikova (Italy) Corinna Dentoni
March 20	Óbidos, Portugal; Carpet $15,000; Singles and doubles draws	(United Kingdom) Manisha Foster (Belgium) Hélène Scholsen; 7–6^{(8–6)}, 6–1	(Germany) Anna Klasen (Netherlands) Erika Vogelsang	(Spain) María Gutiérrez Carrasco (Belgium) Hélène Scholsen	(Germany) Anna Klasen (Italy) Dalila Spiteri (Russia) Yana Sizikova (Italy) Corinna Dentoni
March 20	Hammamet, Tunisia; Clay $15,000; Singles and doubles draws	(Venezuela) Andrea Gámiz; 6–1, 6–3	(France) Jade Suvrijn	(Italy) Camilla Scala (Australia) Isabelle Wallace	(Bulgaria) Isabella Shinikova (Hungary) Ágnes Bukta (Russia) Margarita Lazareva (Germany) Caroline Werner
March 20	Hammamet, Tunisia; Clay $15,000; Singles and doubles draws	(Bulgaria) Isabella Shinikova (Slovakia) Chantal Škamlová; 7–6^{(7–5)}, 4–6, [10–8]	(Russia) Margarita Lazareva (Russia) Maria Marfutina	(Italy) Camilla Scala (Australia) Isabelle Wallace	(Bulgaria) Isabella Shinikova (Hungary) Ágnes Bukta (Russia) Margarita Lazareva (Germany) Caroline Werner
March 20	Antalya, Turkey; Clay $15,000; Singles and doubles draws	(Serbia) Olga Danilović; 6–3, 6–2	(Austria) Julia Grabher	(Ukraine) Marta Kostyuk (Russia) Valentyna Ivakhnenko	(Bosnia and Herzegovina) Jelena Simić (Belgium) Eliessa Vanlangendonck (Serbia) Kristina Ostojić (Kyrgyzstan) Ksenia Palkina
March 20	Antalya, Turkey; Clay $15,000; Singles and doubles draws	(Kyrgyzstan) Ksenia Palkina (Georgia (country)) Sofia Shapatava; 6–4, 7–5	(Slovakia) Sandra Jamrichová (Bosnia and Herzegovina) Jelena Simić	(Ukraine) Marta Kostyuk (Russia) Valentyna Ivakhnenko	(Bosnia and Herzegovina) Jelena Simić (Belgium) Eliessa Vanlangendonck (Serbia) Kristina Ostojić (Kyrgyzstan) Ksenia Palkina
March 27	Blossom Cup; Quanzhou, China; Hard $60,000; Singles – Doubles	(China) Zheng Saisai; 6–2, 6–3	(China) Liu Fangzhou	(South Korea) Jang Su-jeong (Japan) Hiroko Kuwata	(Kazakhstan) Zarina Diyas (China) Zhang Kailin (China) Lu Jingjing (China) Gao Xinyu
March 27	Blossom Cup; Quanzhou, China; Hard $60,000; Singles – Doubles	(China) Han Xinyun (China) Ye Qiuyu; 6–3, 6–3	(Japan) Hiroko Kuwata (China) Zhu Lin	(South Korea) Jang Su-jeong (Japan) Hiroko Kuwata	(Kazakhstan) Zarina Diyas (China) Zhang Kailin (China) Lu Jingjing (China) Gao Xinyu
March 27	Engie Open de Seine-et-Marne; Croissy-Beaubourg, France; Hard (indoor) $60,000; Singles – Doubles	(Russia) Ekaterina Alexandrova; 6–2, 6–7^{(3–7)}, 6–3	(Netherlands) Richèl Hogenkamp	(Germany) Anna Zaja (Czech Republic) Markéta Vondroušová	(Belgium) An-Sophie Mestach (Switzerland) Belinda Bencic (Ukraine) Kateryna Kozlova (Belgium) Maryna Zanevska
March 27	Engie Open de Seine-et-Marne; Croissy-Beaubourg, France; Hard (indoor) $60,000; Singles – Doubles	(Belarus) Vera Lapko (Russia) Polina Monova; 6–3, 6–4	(France) Manon Arcangioli (Poland) Magdalena Fręch	(Germany) Anna Zaja (Czech Republic) Markéta Vondroušová	(Belgium) An-Sophie Mestach (Switzerland) Belinda Bencic (Ukraine) Kateryna Kozlova (Belgium) Maryna Zanevska
March 27	Mornington, Australia; Clay $25,000; Singles and doubles draws	(France) Shérazad Reix; 7–6^{(7–3)}, 6–4	(Czech Republic) Barbora Krejčíková	(Australia) Zoe Hives (Australia) Jessica Moore	(Netherlands) Arantxa Rus (United Kingdom) Gabriella Taylor (Australia) Destanee Aiava (Australia) Lizette Cabrera
March 27	Mornington, Australia; Clay $25,000; Singles and doubles draws	(Israel) Julia Glushko (Czech Republic) Barbora Krejčíková; 6–4, 2–6, [11–9]	(Australia) Jessica Moore (Thailand) Varatchaya Wongteanchai	(Australia) Zoe Hives (Australia) Jessica Moore	(Netherlands) Arantxa Rus (United Kingdom) Gabriella Taylor (Australia) Destanee Aiava (Australia) Lizette Cabrera
March 27	Pula, Italy; Clay $25,000; Singles and doubles draws	(Canada) Bianca Andreescu; 6–7^{(8–10)}, 6–2, 7–6^{(10–8)}	(United States) Bernarda Pera	(Germany) Katharina Hobgarski (Italy) Jasmine Paolini	(Slovenia) Kaja Juvan (Turkey) Başak Eraydın (Italy) Georgia Brescia (Spain) Olga Sáez Larra
March 27	Pula, Italy; Clay $25,000; Singles and doubles draws	(North Macedonia) Lina Gjorcheska (United States) Bernarda Pera; 6–2, 6–3	(India) Prarthana Thombare (Netherlands) Eva Wacanno	(Germany) Katharina Hobgarski (Italy) Jasmine Paolini	(Slovenia) Kaja Juvan (Turkey) Başak Eraydın (Italy) Georgia Brescia (Spain) Olga Sáez Larra
March 27	Kōfu International Open; Kōfu, Japan; Hard $25,000; Singles and doubles draws	(Japan) Mayo Hibi; 5–7, 6–3, 6–2	(South Korea) Han Na-lae	(Japan) Erika Sema (South Korea) Kim Na-ri	(Japan) Haruka Kaji (Japan) Riko Sawayanagi (Thailand) Peangtarn Plipuech (Japan) Eri Hozumi
March 27	Kōfu International Open; Kōfu, Japan; Hard $25,000; Singles and doubles draws	(South Korea) Han Na-lae (Thailand) Luksika Kumkhum; 6–3, 6–0	(Japan) Erina Hayashi (Japan) Robu Kajitani	(Japan) Erika Sema (South Korea) Kim Na-ri	(Japan) Haruka Kaji (Japan) Riko Sawayanagi (Thailand) Peangtarn Plipuech (Japan) Eri Hozumi
March 27	Campinas, Brazil; Clay $15,000; Singles and doubles draws	(Brazil) Paula Cristina Gonçalves; 6–4, 6–4	(Argentina) Stephanie Mariel Petit	(Argentina) María Lourdes Carlé (Germany) Dana Kremer	(Brazil) Nathaly Kurata (Brazil) Gabriela Cé (Argentina) Julieta Lara Estable (Chile) Bárbara Gatica
March 27	Campinas, Brazil; Clay $15,000; Singles and doubles draws	(Brazil) Gabriela Cé (Brazil) Thaísa Grana Pedretti; 6–1, 6–3	(Brazil) Nathaly Kurata (Brazil) Giovanna Tomita	(Argentina) María Lourdes Carlé (Germany) Dana Kremer	(Brazil) Nathaly Kurata (Brazil) Gabriela Cé (Argentina) Julieta Lara Estable (Chile) Bárbara Gatica
March 27	Sharm El Sheikh, Egypt; Hard $15,000; Singles and doubles draws	(Romania) Laura-Ioana Andrei; 6–1, 6–1	(Moldova) Anastasia Vdovenco	(Denmark) Emilie Francati (United Kingdom) Emily Webley-Smith	(Slovakia) Tereza Mihalíková (India) Natasha Palha (Indonesia) Lavinia Tananta (Poland) Paulina Czarnik
March 27	Sharm El Sheikh, Egypt; Hard $15,000; Singles and doubles draws	(Romania) Laura-Ioana Andrei (Austria) Melanie Klaffner; 6–4, 7–5	(Denmark) Emilie Francati (Sweden) Kajsa Rinaldo Persson	(Denmark) Emilie Francati (United Kingdom) Emily Webley-Smith	(Slovakia) Tereza Mihalíková (India) Natasha Palha (Indonesia) Lavinia Tananta (Poland) Paulina Czarnik
March 27	Heraklion, Greece; Clay $15,000; Singles and doubles draws	(United States) Sabrina Santamaria; 6–2, 6–0	(Austria) Mira Antonitsch	(Paraguay) Camila Giangreco Campiz (Czech Republic) Miriam Kolodziejová	(Romania) Nicoleta Dascălu (Canada) Carol Zhao (Belgium) Michaela Boev (Germany) Laura Heinrichs
March 27	Heraklion, Greece; Clay $15,000; Singles and doubles draws	(Canada) Charlotte Robillard-Millette (Canada) Carol Zhao; 7–6^{(7–2)}, 4–6, [10–5]	(Russia) Angelina Gabueva (Russia) Olga Puchkova	(Paraguay) Camila Giangreco Campiz (Czech Republic) Miriam Kolodziejová	(Romania) Nicoleta Dascălu (Canada) Carol Zhao (Belgium) Michaela Boev (Germany) Laura Heinrichs
March 27	Óbidos, Portugal; Carpet $15,000; Singles and doubles draws	(Spain) Nuria Párrizas Díaz; 6–4, 6–3	(United Kingdom) Eden Silva	(United Kingdom) Laura Sainsbury (Spain) María José Luque Moreno	(Italy) Corinna Dentoni (United Kingdom) Manisha Foster (Spain) Lucía Cortez Llorca (Belgium) Hélène Scholsen
March 27	Óbidos, Portugal; Carpet $15,000; Singles and doubles draws	(Germany) Anna Klasen (Netherlands) Erika Vogelsang; 6–4, 6–1	(United Kingdom) Olivia Nicholls (United Kingdom) Laura Sainsbury	(United Kingdom) Laura Sainsbury (Spain) María José Luque Moreno	(Italy) Corinna Dentoni (United Kingdom) Manisha Foster (Spain) Lucía Cortez Llorca (Belgium) Hélène Scholsen
March 27	Hammamet, Tunisia; Clay $15,000; Singles and doubles draws	(Venezuela) Andrea Gámiz; 6–2, 6–1	(Spain) Yvonne Cavallé Reimers	(Romania) Oana Gavrilă (Australia) Isabelle Wallace	(Chile) Fernanda Brito (Greece) Eleni Kordolaimi (Spain) Irene Burillo Escorihuela (Russia) Margarita Lazareva
March 27	Hammamet, Tunisia; Clay $15,000; Singles and doubles draws	(Spain) Irene Burillo Escorihuela (Spain) Yvonne Cavallé Reimers; 6–4, 6–3	(Ecuador) Charlotte Römer (Australia) Isabelle Wallace	(Romania) Oana Gavrilă (Australia) Isabelle Wallace	(Chile) Fernanda Brito (Greece) Eleni Kordolaimi (Spain) Irene Burillo Escorihuela (Russia) Margarita Lazareva
March 27	Istanbul, Turkey; Hard (indoor) $15,000; Singles and doubles draws	(United Kingdom) Katie Boulter; 6–3, 3–6, 6–3	(Turkey) Ayla Aksu	(Israel) Vlada Ekshibarova (Denmark) Karen Barritza	(Russia) Valentyna Ivakhnenko (United Kingdom) Freya Christie (Turkey) İpek Öz (Belgium) Britt Geukens
March 27	Istanbul, Turkey; Hard (indoor) $15,000; Singles and doubles draws	(Russia) Ekaterina Kazionova (Russia) Elena Rybakina; 6–1, 6–3	(Greece) Eleni Daniilidou (Israel) Vlada Ekshibarova	(Israel) Vlada Ekshibarova (Denmark) Karen Barritza	(Russia) Valentyna Ivakhnenko (United Kingdom) Freya Christie (Turkey) İpek Öz (Belgium) Britt Geukens
