= 2017 Torneo Internazionale Femminile Antico Tiro a Volo – Doubles =

Doubles
- 2017 Torneo Internazionale Femminile Antico Tiro a Volo

Final
- Champion: (Russia) Anastasiya Komardina (Argentina) Nadia Podoroska
- Runner-up: (Netherlands) Quirine Lemoine (Netherlands) Eva Wacanno
- Score: 7–6^{(7–3)}, 6–3

Events
| Singles | Doubles |
| ← 2016 · | Torneo Internazionale Femminile Antico Tiro a Volo | · 2018 → |

İpek Soylu and Xu Shilin were the defending champions, but both players chose not to participate.

Anastasiya Komardina and Nadia Podoroska won the title, defeating Quirine Lemoine and Eva Wacanno in the final, 7–6^{(7–3)}, 6–3.

== Seeds ==
1. (Romania) Alexandra Cadanțu / (Latvia) Diāna Marcinkēviča (semifinals)
2. (Colombia) Mariana Duque / (Chile) Daniela Seguel (semifinals)
3. (Netherlands) Quirine Lemoine / (Netherlands) Eva Wacanno (final)
4. (Russia) Anastasiya Komardina / (Argentina) Nadia Podoroska (champions)

== Draw ==
=== Key ===
- Q = Qualifier
- WC = Wild card
- LL = Lucky loser
- Alt = Alternate
- SE = Special exempt
- PR = Protected ranking
- ITF = ITF entry
- JE = Junior exempt
- w/o = Walkover
- r = Retired
- d = Defaulted
- SR = Special ranking

First round
1 | (Romania) A Cadanțu (Latvia) D Marcinkēviča | 3 | 6 | [10]
(Italy) M Caregaro (Italy) M Di Giuseppe | 6 | 4 | [3]
(United States) UM Arconada (Romania) EG Ruse | 3 | 6 | [10]
(Romania) D Negreanu (Romania) OG Simion | 6 | 3 | [8]
4 | (Russia) A Komardina (Argentina) N Podoroska | 6 | 6
(Italy) G Brescia (Croatia) T Mrdeža | 2 | 4
(Greece) E Daniilidou (Switzerland) L Sabino | 6 | 6
WC | (Italy) G Crescenzi (Italy) S Giovanardi | 0 | 1
(Italy) A Matteucci (Italy) C Rosatello | 6 | 6
(France) C Paquet (Poland) K Piter | 4 | 4
WC | (Italy) N Burnett (Italy) G Marchetti | 4 | 6 | [9]
3 | (Netherlands) Q Lemoine (Netherlands) E Wacanno | 6 | 3 | [11]
(Uzbekistan) A Amanmuradova (Italy) A Grymalska | 2 | 3
(Serbia) J Jakšić (Georgia (country)) S Shapatava | 6 | 6
(Austria) P König (Serbia) N Kostić | 2 | 7^{7} | [6]
2 | (Colombia) M Duque (Chile) D Seguel | 6 | 6^{3} | [10]

Quarterfinals
1 | (Romania) A Cadanțu (Latvia) D Marcinkēviča | w/o
(United States) UM Arconada (Romania) EG Ruse
4 | (Russia) A Komardina (Argentina) N Podoroska | 6 | 7^{7}
(Greece) E Daniilidou (Switzerland) L Sabino | 0 | 6^{2}
(Italy) A Matteucci (Italy) C Rosatello
3 | (Netherlands) Q Lemoine (Netherlands) E Wacanno | w/o
(Serbia) J Jakšić (Georgia (country)) S Shapatava | 0 | 4
2 | (Colombia) M Duque (Chile) D Seguel | 6 | 6

Semifinals
1 | (Romania) A Cadanțu (Latvia) D Marcinkēviča | 4 | 5
4 | (Russia) A Komardina (Argentina) N Podoroska | 6 | 7
3 | (Netherlands) Q Lemoine (Netherlands) E Wacanno | 6 | 7^{7}
2 | (Colombia) M Duque (Chile) D Seguel | 4 | 6^{5}

Final
4 | (Russia) A Komardina (Argentina) N Podoroska | 7^{7} | 6
3 | (Netherlands) Q Lemoine (Netherlands) E Wacanno | 6^{3} | 3
