= 2017 Torneo Internazionale Femminile Antico Tiro a Volo – Singles =

Singles
- 2017 Torneo Internazionale Femminile Antico Tiro a Volo

Final
- Champion: (Ukraine) Kateryna Kozlova
- Runner-up: (Colombia) Mariana Duque
- Score: 7–6^{(8–6)}, 6–4

Events
Singles	Doubles
← 2016 ·	Torneo Internazionale Femminile Antico Tiro a Volo	· 2018 →

Sílvia Soler Espinosa was the defending champion, but lost in the quarterfinals to Jessica Pieri.

Kateryna Kozlova won the title, defeating Mariana Duque in the final, 7–6^{(8–6)}, 6–4.

== Seeds ==
1. (Romania) Patricia Maria Țig (withdrew)
2. (Colombia) Mariana Duque (final)
3. (Italy) Jasmine Paolini (withdrew)
4. (Slovenia) Dalila Jakupović (second round)
5. (Netherlands) Quirine Lemoine (first round)
6. (Spain) Sílvia Soler Espinosa (quarterfinals)
7. (Ukraine) Kateryna Kozlova (champion)
8. (Bulgaria) Viktoriya Tomova(semifinals)

== Draw ==
=== Key ===
- Q = Qualifier
- WC = Wild card
- LL = Lucky loser
- Alt = Alternate
- SE = Special exempt
- PR = Protected ranking
- ITF = ITF entry
- JE = Junior exempt
- w/o = Walkover
- r = Retired
- d = Defaulted
- SR = Special ranking

=== Finals ===
Semifinals
WC	(Italy) Jessica Pieri	2	4
7	(Ukraine) Kateryna Kozlova	6	6
8	(Bulgaria) Viktoriya Tomova	3	2
2	(Colombia) Mariana Duque	6	6

Final
7	(Ukraine) Kateryna Kozlova	7^{8}	6
2	(Colombia) Mariana Duque	6^{6}	4

=== Top half ===
First round
LL	(Latvia) D Marcinkēviča	6	2	1
(United States) UM Arconada	4	6	6
(Paraguay) M González	4	0^{r}
WC	(Italy) J Pieri	6	1
Q	(Italy) A Matteucci	6	2	5
(Croatia) T Mrdeža	1	6	7
Q	(Italy) D Chiesa	2	4
6	(Spain) S Soler Espinosa	6	6
LL	(Romania) EG Ruse	6	6
(Poland) K Piter	2	4
(Serbia) J Jakšić	2	7^{7}	0
(Russia) V Kamenskaya	6	6^{4}	6
(Georgia (country)) S Shapatava	2	6	6
WC	(Italy) M Di Giuseppe	6	3	4
(Italy) C Rosatello	3	1
7	(Ukraine) K Kozlova	6	6

Second round
(United States) UM Arconada	7	3	1
WC	(Italy) J Pieri	5	6	6
(Croatia) T Mrdeža	6	1	0
6	(Spain) S Soler Espinosa	2	6	6
LL	(Romania) EG Ruse	5	5^{r}
(Russia) V Kamenskaya	7	5
(Georgia (country)) S Shapatava	0	1
7	(Ukraine) K Kozlova	6	6

Quarterfinals
WC	(Italy) J Pieri	6	6
6	(Spain) S Soler Espinosa	1	1
(Russia) V Kamenskaya	6	3	1
7	(Ukraine) K Kozlova	4	6	6

Semifinals
WC	(Italy) J Pieri	2	4
7	(Ukraine) K Kozlova	6	6

=== Bottom half ===
First round
8	(Bulgaria) V Tomova	2	7^{7}	6
(Romania) A Cadanțu	6	6^{0}	2
Q	(Italy) M Caregaro	1	4
(Chile) D Seguel	6	6
(Czech Republic) M Bouzková	6	2	3
(Italy) M Trevisan	2	6	6
(Argentina) N Podoroska	4	3
4	(Slovenia) D Jakupović	6	6
5	(Netherlands) Q Lemoine	0	1
(Italy) G Brescia	6	6
(France) C Paquet	6	6
WC	(Italy) N Burnett	0	1
Q	(Italy) A Grymalska	6	6
WC	(United States) N Nikprelevic	0	0
(Russia) A Komardina	1	2
2	(Colombia) M Duque	6	6

Second round
8	(Bulgaria) V Tomova	7	6
(Chile) D Seguel	5	3
(Italy) M Trevisan	6	6
4	(Slovenia) D Jakupović	3	4
(Italy) G Brescia	6	6
(France) C Paquet	1	3
Q	(Italy) A Grymalska	3	0
2	(Colombia) M Duque	6	6

Quarterfinals
8	(Bulgaria) V Tomova	6	4	6
(Italy) M Trevisan	4	6	2
(Italy) G Brescia	4	4
2	(Colombia) M Duque	6	6

Semifinals
8	(Bulgaria) V Tomova	3	2
2	(Colombia) M Duque	6	6
