= 2016 Torneo Internazionale Femminile Antico Tiro a Volo – Singles =

Singles
- 2016 Torneo Internazionale Femminile Antico Tiro a Volo

Final
- Champion: (Spain) Sílvia Soler Espinosa
- Runner-up: (Spain) Laura Pous Tió
- Score: 2–6, 6–4, 7–5

Events
Singles	Doubles
← 2015 ·	Torneo Internazionale Femminile Antico Tiro a Volo	· 2017 →

Martina Trevisan was the defending champion, but lost in the first round to Anastasia Grymalska.

Sílvia Soler Espinosa won the title, defeating Laura Pous Tió in an all-Spanish final, 2–6, 6–4, 7–5.

== Seeds ==
1. (Spain) Sílvia Soler Espinosa (champion)
2. (France) Alizé Lim (second round)
3. (Turkey) İpek Soylu (first round)
4. (United States) Jessica Pegula (first round)
5. (France) Myrtille Georges (second round)
6. (Belarus) Aryna Sabalenka (second round)
7. (Slovakia) Rebecca Šramková (second round)
8. (Germany) Anne Schäfer (first round)

== Main draw ==
=== Key ===
- Q = Qualifier
- WC = Wild card
- LL = Lucky loser
- Alt = Alternate
- SE = Special exempt
- PR = Protected ranking
- ITF = ITF entry
- JE = Junior exempt
- w/o = Walkover
- r = Retired
- d = Defaulted
- SR = Special ranking

=== Finals ===
Semifinals
1	(Spain) Sílvia Soler Espinosa	6	6
(Romania) Alexandra Cadanțu	1	3
(Spain) Laura Pous Tió	6	6
(Netherlands) Arantxa Rus	3	3

Final
1	(Spain) Sílvia Soler Espinosa	2	6	7
(Spain) Laura Pous Tió	6	4	5

=== Top half ===
First round
1	(Spain) S Soler Espinosa	6	7^{7}
(Mexico) V Rodríguez	3	6^{3}
(Croatia) T Lukas	3	3
(Georgia (country)) S Shapatava	6	6
(Romania) C Dinu	6	7^{7}
(Romania) N Dascălu	2	6^{3}
Q	(Italy) J Paolini	6	3	4
7	(Slovakia) R Šramková	4	6	6
3	(Turkey) İ Soylu	0	6	4
(Romania) A Cadanțu	6	2	6
Q	(Italy) M Di Giuseppe	5	6	5
WC	(Italy) J Pieri	7	3	7
Q	(Switzerland) L Sabino	1	1
(Poland) K Piter	6	6
WC	(Italy) C Ferrando	2	2
5	(France) M Georges	6	6

Second round
1	(Spain) S Soler Espinosa	6	6
(Georgia (country)) S Shapatava	1	4
(Romania) C Dinu	7	6
7	(Slovakia) R Šramková	5	4
(Romania) A Cadanțu	2	6	6
WC	(Italy) J Pieri	6	2	2
(Poland) K Piter	3	6	6
5	(France) M Georges	6	2	3

Quarterfinals
1	(Spain) S Soler Espinosa	6	6
(Romania) C Dinu	1	0
(Romania) A Cadanțu	6	4
(Poland) K Piter	3	1^{r}

Semifinals
1	(Spain) S Soler Espinosa	6	6
(Romania) A Cadanțu	1	3

=== Bottom half ===
First round
8	(Germany) A Schäfer	2	2
(Liechtenstein) S Vogt	6	6
(Spain) L Pous Tió	6	6
(Paraguay) M González	3	4
LL	(Italy) M Spigarelli	6	5	4
WC	(Italy) N Burnett	4	7	6
(Hungary) R-L Jani	1	6	6
4	(United States) J Pegula	6	2	3
6	(Belarus) A Sabalenka	6	6
Q	(Australia) A Bai	2	3
(Italy) A Grymalska	7^{7}	1	6
WC	(Italy) M Trevisan	6^{4}	6	0
(Venezuela) A Gámiz	4	4
(Netherlands) A Rus	6	6
(China) S Xu	5	6	2
2	(France) A Lim	7	2	6

Second round
(Liechtenstein) S Vogt	4	4
(Spain) L Pous Tió	6	6
WC	(Italy) N Burnett	7	6
(Hungary) R-L Jani	5	2
6	(Belarus) A Sabalenka	3	6	6^{2}
(Italy) A Grymalska	6	4	7^{7}
(Netherlands) A Rus	6	6
2	(France) A Lim	1	2

Quarterfinals
(Spain) L Pous Tió	6	6
WC	(Italy) N Burnett	3	4
(Italy) A Grymalska	3	4
(Netherlands) A Rus	6	6

Semifinals
(Spain) L Pous Tió	6	6
(Netherlands) A Rus	3	3
