= 2017 Launceston Tennis International – Women's singles =

Women's singles
- 2017 Launceston Tennis International

Final
- Champion: (United States) Jamie Loeb
- Runner-up: (Slovenia) Tamara Zidanšek
- Score: 7–6^{(7–4)}, 6–3

Events
Singles	men	women
Doubles	men	women
← 2016 ·	Launceston Tennis International	· 2018 →

Han Xinyun was the defending champion, but lost in the quarterfinals to Jamie Loeb.

Loeb won the title, defeating Tamara Zidanšek in the final, 7–6^{(7–4)}, 6–3.

== Seeds ==
1. (China) Han Xinyun (quarterfinals)
2. (United States) Taylor Townsend (first round)
3. (China) Liu Fangzhou (second round)
4. (Slovenia) Tamara Zidanšek (final)
5. (United States) Asia Muhammad (semifinals)
6. (United States) Jamie Loeb (champion)
7. (Australia) Lizette Cabrera (first round)
8. (Japan) Miyu Kato (first round)

== Main draw ==
=== Key ===
- Q = Qualifier
- WC = Wild card
- LL = Lucky loser
- Alt = Alternate
- SE = Special exempt
- PR = Protected ranking
- ITF = ITF entry
- JE = Junior exempt
- w/o = Walkover
- r = Retired
- d = Defaulted
- SR = Special ranking

=== Finals ===
Semifinals
6	(United States) Jamie Loeb	4	7^{9}	6
5	(United States) Asia Muhammad	6	6^{7}	1
4	(Slovenia) Tamara Zidanšek	6	3	6
(Czech Republic) Barbora Krejčíková	2	6	3

Final
6	(United States) Jamie Loeb	7^{7}	6
4	(Slovenia) Tamara Zidanšek	6^{4}	3

=== Top half ===
First round
1	(China) X Han	7^{7}	3	6
(France) S Reix	6^{5}	6	3
Q	(Italy) G Brescia	6	6
WC	(Australia) M Inglis	4	1
Q	(France) T Andrianjafitrimo	3	1
Q	(China) R Tian	6	6
(United States) J Elie	2	1
6	(United States) J Loeb	6	6
3	(China) F Liu	6	6
(Australia) O Rogowska	4	1
(China) J Lu	3	6^{11}
(United States) K Ahn	6	7^{13}
Q	(China) Y Xu	6^{4}	2
(France) M Georges	7^{7}	6
(Japan) K Okamura	4	3
5	(United States) A Muhammad	6	6

Second round
1	(China) X Han	6	6
Q	(Italy) G Brescia	1	1
Q	(China) R Tian	4	1
6	(United States) J Loeb	6	6
(China) F Liu	0	1
(United States) K Ahn	6	6
(France) M Georges	3	6	1
5	(United States) A Muhammad	6	1	6

Quarterfinals
1	(China) X Han	1	6	1
6	(United States) J Loeb	6	3	6
(United States) K Ahn	3	3
5	(United States) A Muhammad	6	6

Semifinals
6	(United States) J Loeb	4	7^{9}	6
5	(United States) A Muhammad	6	6^{7}	1

=== Bottom half ===
First round
7	(Australia) L Cabrera	5	3
(United Kingdom) K Dunne	7	6
WC	(Australia) S Peers	4	3
(Romania) IM Bara	6	6
(Czech Republic) M Bouzková	6	6
(Japan) R Sawayanagi	2	0
(Bulgaria) A Naydenova	0	3
4	(Slovenia) T Zidanšek	6	6
8	(Japan) M Kato	3	1
WC	(Australia) J Fourlis	6	6
(China) Y Zhang	3	3
(Thailand) V Wongteanchai	6	6
WC	(Australia) K Birrell	6	6
(France) A Lim	3	2
(Czech Republic) B Krejčíková	6^{2}	6	6
2	(United States) T Townsend	7^{7}	2	2

Second round
(United Kingdom) K Dunne	2	6	6
(Romania) IM Bara	6	4	3
(Czech Republic) M Bouzková	6^{5}	3
4	(Slovenia) T Zidanšek	7^{7}	6
WC	(Australia) J Fourlis	6	6
(Thailand) V Wongteanchai	4	3
WC	(Australia) K Birrell	5	2
(Czech Republic) B Krejčíková	7	6

Quarterfinals
(United Kingdom) K Dunne	0	1^{r}
4	(Slovenia) T Zidanšek	6	3
WC	(Australia) J Fourlis	2	4
(Czech Republic) B Krejčíková	6	6

Semifinals
4	(Slovenia) T Zidanšek	6	3	6
(Czech Republic) B Krejčíková	2	6	3
