= 2017 Launceston Tennis International – Men's singles =

Men's singles
- 2017 Launceston Tennis International

Final
- Champion: (United States) Noah Rubin
- Runner-up: (United States) Mitchell Krueger
- Score: 6–0, 6–1

Events
| Singles | men | women |
| Doubles | men | women |
- Launceston Tennis International

Blake Mott was the defending champion but lost in the first round to Brydan Klein.

Noah Rubin won the title after defeating Mitchell Krueger 6–0, 6–1 in the final.

== Seeds ==
1. (Japan) Go Soeda (first round)
2. (Czech Republic) Jan Šátral (first round, retired)
3. (Chinese Taipei) Jason Jung (first round)
4. (Australia) Andrew Whittington (quarterfinals)
5. (Australia) Sam Groth (withdrew)
6. (Egypt) Mohamed Safwat (semifinals)
7. (United States) Noah Rubin (champion)
8. (Japan) Akira Santillan (first round)

== Draw ==
Key

- Q = Qualifier
- WC = Wild card
- LL = Lucky loser
- Alt = Alternate
- ITF = ITF entry
- PR = Protected ranking
- SR = Special ranking
- SE = Special exempt
- JE = Junior exempt
- JR = Junior Accelerator Programme entrant
- CO = College Accelerator Programme entrant
- NG = Next Gen Accelerator Program entrant
- w/o = Walkover
- r = Retired
- d = Defaulted

=== Finals ===
Semifinals
6 | (Egypt) Mohamed Safwat | 5 | 6 | 3
(United States) Mitchell Krueger | 7 | 4 | 6
7 | (United States) Noah Rubin | 6 | 6
(United States) Daniel Nguyen | 3 | 2

Final
(United States) Mitchell Krueger | 0 | 1
7 | (United States) Noah Rubin | 6 | 6

=== Top half ===
First round
1 | (Japan) G Soeda | 6 | 4 | 3
(Australia) A De Minaur | 3 | 6 | 6
Q | (Australia) J Frawley | 4 | 6 | 2
WC | (Australia) A Bolt | 6 | 2 | 6
(Australia) C O'Connell | 7 | 6
(Australia) D Kelly | 5 | 4
WC | (Australia) H Bourchier | 4 | 7^{7} | 3
6 | (Egypt) M Safwat | 6 | 6^{2} | 6
3 | (Chinese Taipei) J Jung | 4 | 6 | 3
WC | (Australia) M Banes | 6 | 4 | 6
WC | (Australia) D Nolan | 2 | 3
Q | (Chinese Taipei) T-h Yang | 6 | 6
(Australia) O Jasika | 6 | 7
(Kazakhstan) D Popko | 3 | 5
(United States) M Krueger | 6 | 7
8 | (Japan) A Santillan | 4 | 5

Second round
(Australia) A De Minaur | 6 | 4 | 5
WC | (Australia) A Bolt | 3 | 6 | 7
(Australia) C O'Connell | 3 | 6 | 3
6 | (Egypt) M Safwat | 6 | 2 | 6
WC | (Australia) M Banes | 6 | 2 | 5
Q | (Chinese Taipei) T-h Yang | 3 | 6 | 7
(Australia) O Jasika | 4 | 0
(United States) M Krueger | 6 | 6

Quarterfinals
WC | (Australia) A Bolt | 6^{3} | 3
6 | (Egypt) M Safwat | 7^{7} | 6
Q | (Chinese Taipei) T-h Yang | 4 | 5
(United States) M Krueger | 6 | 7

Semifinals
6 | (Egypt) M Safwat | 5 | 6 | 3
(United States) M Krueger | 7 | 4 | 6

=== Bottom half ===
First round
7 | (United States) N Rubin | 7^{7} | 7^{8}
(Australia) L Saville | 6^{4} | 6^{6}
Q | (Australia) B Mousley | 7^{7} | 6
LL | (Switzerland) L Margaroli | 6^{4} | 4
(United Kingdom) B Klein | 6 | 6
(Australia) B Mott | 3 | 4
(Slovenia) B Rola | 6 | 6^{1} | 3
4 | (Australia) A Whittington | 1 | 7^{7} | 6
LL | (United States) N Pasha | 6^{3} | 6^{1}
(United States) D Nguyen | 7^{7} | 7^{7}
(Australia) M Polmans | 6^{3} | 6 | 6
(United States) E King | 7^{7} | 4 | 4
Q | (Germany) S Fanselow | 6 | 4 | 6^{5}
(Australia) M Purcell | 4 | 6 | 7^{7}
(Italy) R Bellotti | 6 | 3
2 | (Czech Republic) J Šátral | 2 | 1^{r}

Second round
7 | (United States) N Rubin | 6 | 6
Q | (Australia) B Mousley | 4 | 4
(United Kingdom) B Klein | 4 | 6 | 3
4 | (Australia) A Whittington | 6 | 3 | 6
(United States) D Nguyen | 7^{7} | 6
(Australia) M Polmans | 6^{1} | 4
(Australia) M Purcell | 6 | 3 | 2
(Italy) R Bellotti | 4 | 6 | 6

Quarterfinals
7 | (United States) N Rubin | 5 | 6 | 6
4 | (Australia) A Whittington | 7 | 1 | 3
(United States) D Nguyen | 6 | 4 | 6
(Italy) R Bellotti | 4 | 6 | 0

Semifinals
7 | (United States) N Rubin | 6 | 6
(United States) D Nguyen | 3 | 2
