= 2016 Torneo Internazionale Femminile Antico Tiro a Volo =

- Date: 27 June–3 July
- Edition: 8th
- Category: ITF Women's Circuit
- Prize money: $50,000
- Surface: Clay
- Location: Rome, Italy

Champions

Singles
- (Spain) Sílvia Soler Espinosa

Doubles
- (Turkey) İpek Soylu / (China) Xu Shilin
- Torneo Internazionale Femminile Antico Tiro a Volo

The 2016 Torneo Internazionale Femminile Antico Tiro a Volo was a professional tennis tournament played on outdoor clay courts. It was the eighth edition of the tournament and part of the 2016 ITF Women's Circuit, offering a total of $50,000 in prize money. It took place in Rome, Italy, on 27 June–3 July 2016.

== Singles main draw entrants ==
=== Seeds ===
Country	Player	Rank^{1}	Seed
ESP	Sílvia Soler Espinosa	139	1
FRA	Alizé Lim	157	2
TUR	İpek Soylu	161	3
USA	Jessica Pegula	171	4
FRA	Myrtille Georges	179	5
BLR	Aryna Sabalenka	205	6
SVK	Rebecca Šramková	208	7
GER	Anne Schäfer	222	8

- ^{1} Rankings as of 20 June 2016.

=== Other entrants ===
The following player received a wildcard into the singles main draw:

- (Italy) Nastassja Burnett
- (Italy) Cristiana Ferrando
- (Italy) Jessica Pieri
- (Italy) Martina Trevisan

The following players received entry from the qualifying draw:

- (Australia) Alison Bai
- (Italy) Martina Di Giuseppe
- (Italy) Jasmine Paolini
- (Switzerland) Lisa Sabino

The following player received entry by a lucky loser spot:

- (Italy) Martina Spigarelli

== Champions ==
=== Singles ===
- (Spain) Sílvia Soler Espinosa def. (Spain) Laura Pous Tió, 2–6, 6–4, 7–5

=== Doubles ===
- (Turkey) İpek Soylu / (China) Xu Shilin def. (Hungary) Réka Luca Jani / (Georgia (country)) Sofia Shapatava, 7–5, 6–1
