= 2017 Launceston Tennis International – Women's doubles =

Women's doubles
- 2017 Launceston Tennis International

Final
- Champions: (Australia) Monique Adamczak (United States) Nicole Melichar
- Runners-up: (Italy) Georgia Brescia (Slovenia) Tamara Zidanšek
- Score: 6–1, 6–2

Events
Singles	men	women
Doubles	men	women
← 2016 ·	Launceston Tennis International	· 2018 →

You Xiaodi and Zhu Lin were the defending champions, but chose not to participate.

Monique Adamczak and Nicole Melichar won the title, defeating Georgia Brescia and Tamara Zidanšek in the final, 6–1, 6–2.

== Seeds ==
1. (Australia) Jessica Moore / (China) Xu Yifan (quarterfinals)
2. (China) Han Xinyun / (Czech Republic) Barbora Krejčíková (first round)
3. (China) Lu Jingjing / (Thailand) Varatchaya Wongteanchai (semifinals)
4. (Bulgaria) Aleksandrina Naydenova / (Japan) Riko Sawayanagi (first round)

== Draw ==
=== Key ===
- Q = Qualifier
- WC = Wild card
- LL = Lucky loser
- Alt = Alternate
- SE = Special exempt
- PR = Protected ranking
- ITF = ITF entry
- JE = Junior exempt
- w/o = Walkover
- r = Retired
- d = Defaulted
- SR = Special ranking

First round
1	(Australia) J Moore (China) Y Xu	6	7
WC	(Australia) J Fourlis (Australia) S Peers	3	5
(France) A Lim (France) S Reix	6	4	[10]
WC	(Australia) L Cabrera (Australia) P Hon	4	6	[7]
4	(Bulgaria) A Naydenova (Japan) R Sawayanagi	6^{6}	2
Q	(Italy) G Brescia (Slovenia) T Zidanšek	7^{8}	6
(United States) K Ahn (United States) J Loeb	3	3
(Australia) A Bai (Australia) O Tjandramulia	6	6
(Romania) IM Bara (Japan) K Okamura	6	3	[10]
(China) F Liu (China) R Tian	2	6	[6]
(Australia) A Myers (Japan) Y Tanaka	4	6^{3}
3	(China) J Lu (Thailand) V Wongteanchai	6	7^{7}
Q	(Australia) N Bains (Papua New Guinea) A Tere-Apisah	7	4	[11]
WC	(Australia) M Jovanovic (Australia) A Walters	5	6	[9]
(Australia) M Adamczak (United States) N Melichar	6	6
2	(China) X Han (Czech Republic) B Krejčíková	2	3

Quarterfinals
1	(Australia) J Moore (China) Y Xu	2	5
(France) A Lim (France) S Reix	6	7
Q	(Italy) G Brescia (Slovenia) T Zidanšek	6	6
(Australia) A Bai (Australia) O Tjandramulia	4	2
(Romania) IM Bara (Japan) K Okamura	6	4	[4]
3	(China) J Lu (Thailand) V Wongteanchai	3	6	[10]
Q	(Australia) N Bains (Papua New Guinea) A Tere-Apisah	7^{7}	2	[2]
(Australia) M Adamczak (United States) N Melichar	6^{5}	6	[10]

Semifinals
(France) A Lim (France) S Reix	2	2
Q	(Italy) G Brescia (Slovenia) T Zidanšek	6	6
3	(China) J Lu (Thailand) V Wongteanchai	6^{9}	6	[6]
(Australia) M Adamczak (United States) N Melichar	7^{11}	4	[10]

Final
Q	(Italy) G Brescia (Slovenia) T Zidanšek	1	2
(Australia) M Adamczak (United States) N Melichar	6	6
