= 2016 Torneo Internazionale Femminile Antico Tiro a Volo – Doubles =

Tennis tournament event

Doubles
- 2016 Torneo Internazionale Femminile Antico Tiro a Volo

Final
- Champions: (Turkey) İpek Soylu (China) Xu Shilin
- Runners-up: (Hungary) Réka Luca Jani (Georgia (country)) Sofia Shapatava
- Score: 7–5, 6–1

Events
Singles	Doubles
← 2015 ·	Torneo Internazionale Femminile Antico Tiro a Volo	· 2017 →

Claudia Giovine and Despina Papamichail were the defending champions, but chose not to participate.

İpek Soylu and Xu Shilin won the title, defeating Réka Luca Jani and Sofia Shapatava in the final, 7–5, 6–1.

== Seeds ==
1. (Turkey) İpek Soylu / (China) Xu Shilin (champions)
2. (Hungary) Réka Luca Jani / (Georgia (country)) Sofia Shapatava (final)
3. (Romania) Alexandra Cadanțu / (Poland) Katarzyna Piter (semifinals; withdrew)
4. (France) Alizé Lim / (Netherlands) Arantxa Rus (semifinals)

== Draw ==
=== Key ===
- Q = Qualifier
- WC = Wild card
- LL = Lucky loser
- Alt = Alternate
- SE = Special exempt
- PR = Protected ranking
- ITF = ITF entry
- JE = Junior exempt
- w/o = Walkover
- r = Retired
- d = Defaulted
- SR = Special ranking

First round
1	(Turkey) İ Soylu (China) S Xu	6	6
(Italy) S Giovanardi (Italy) M Natali	4	0
WC	(Italy) B Lombardo (Switzerland) L Sabino	7^{7}	2	[12]
(Ukraine) A Fedoryshyn (Italy) A Grymalska	6^{4}	6	[10]
3	(Romania) A Cadanțu (Poland) K Piter	6	6
(Italy) C Coppola (Spain) S Soler Espinosa	0	3
(Germany) N Geuer (Germany) A Schäfer	6	7
(Romania) N Dascălu (Belarus) A Sabalenka	4	5
(Italy) M Colmegna (Paraguay) M González	6	3	[10]
(Australia) A Bai (Spain) O Parres Azcoitia	2	6	[4]
Alt	(Italy) S Ciccone (Italy) V Ciccone	0	0
4	(France) A Lim (Netherlands) A Rus	6	6
(Italy) C Ferrando (Mexico) V Rodríguez	6	6
(Italy) G Marchetti (Italy) M Masini	4	3
WC	(Italy) M Biagianti (Italy) C Catini	3	0
2	(Hungary) RL Jani (Georgia (country)) S Shapatava	6	6

Quarterfinals
1	(Turkey) İ Soylu (China) S Xu	6	7
WC	(Italy) B Lombardo (Switzerland) L Sabino	4	5
3	(Romania) A Cadanțu (Poland) K Piter	2	6	[10]
(Germany) N Geuer (Germany) A Schäfer	6	3	[3]
(Italy) M Colmegna (Paraguay) M González	2	1
4	(France) A Lim (Netherlands) A Rus	6	6
(Italy) C Ferrando (Mexico) V Rodríguez	7	5	[7]
2	(Hungary) RL Jani (Georgia (country)) S Shapatava	5	7	[10]

Semifinals
1	(Turkey) İ Soylu (China) S Xu	w/o
3	(Romania) A Cadanțu (Poland) K Piter
4	(France) A Lim (Netherlands) A Rus	3	4
2	(Hungary) RL Jani (Georgia (country)) S Shapatava	6	6

Final
1	(Turkey) İ Soylu (China) S Xu	7	6
2	(Hungary) RL Jani (Georgia (country)) S Shapatava	5	1
