= 2017 Torneo Internazionale Femminile Antico Tiro a Volo =

Women's tennis tournament

- Date: 3–9 July
- Edition: 9th
- Category: ITF Women's Circuit
- Prize money: $60,000
- Surface: Clay
- Location: Rome, Italy

Champions

Singles
- (Ukraine) Kateryna Kozlova

Doubles
- (Russia) Anastasiya Komardina / (Argentina) Nadia Podoroska
- Torneo Internazionale Femminile Antico Tiro a Volo

The 2017 Torneo Internazionale Femminile Antico Tiro a Volo was a professional tennis tournament played on outdoor clay courts. It was the ninth edition of the tournament and was part of the 2017 ITF Women's Circuit. It took place in Rome, Italy, on 3–9 July 2017.

== Singles main draw entrants ==
=== Seeds ===
Country	Player	Rank^{1}	Seed
~~ROU~~	~~Patricia Maria Țig~~	~~118~~	~~1~~
COL	Mariana Duque	119	2
~~ITA~~	~~Jasmine Paolini~~	~~132~~	~~3~~
SLO	Dalila Jakupović	136	4
NED	Quirine Lemoine	148	5
ESP	Sílvia Soler Espinosa	153	6
UKR	Kateryna Kozlova	159	7
BUL	Viktoriya Tomova	161	8

- ^{1} Rankings as of 26 June 2017.

=== Other entrants ===
The following player received a wildcard into the singles main draw:

- (Italy) Nastassja Burnett
- (Italy) Martina Di Giuseppe
- (United States) Nina Nikprelevic
- (Italy) Jessica Pieri

The following players received entry from the qualifying draw:

- (Italy) Martina Caregaro
- (Italy) Deborah Chiesa
- (Italy) Anastasia Grymalska
- (Italy) Alice Matteucci

The following players received entry as lucky losers:

- (Latvia) Diāna Marcinkēviča
- (Romania) Elena Gabriela Ruse

== Champions ==
=== Singles ===
- (Ukraine) Kateryna Kozlova def. (Colombia) Mariana Duque, 7–6^{(8–6)}, 6–4

=== Doubles ===
- (Russia) Anastasiya Komardina / (Argentina) Nadia Podoroska def. (Netherlands) Quirine Lemoine / (Netherlands) Eva Wacanno, 7–6^{(7–3)}, 6–3
