= 2017 Launceston Tennis International – Men's doubles =

Men's doubles
- 2017 Launceston Tennis International

Final
- Champions: (Australia) Bradley Mousley (Australia) Luke Saville
- Runners-up: (Australia) Alex Bolt (Australia) Andrew Whittington
- Score: 6–2, 6–1

Events
| Singles | men | women |
| Doubles | men | women |
| ← 2016 · | Launceston Tennis International | · 2018 → |

Luke Saville and Jordan Thompson were the defending champions but only Saville chose to defend his title, partnering Bradley Mousley. Saville successfully defended his title.

Mousley and Saville won the title after defeating Alex Bolt and Andrew Whittington 6–2, 6–1 in the final.

== Seeds ==
1. (Australia) Steven de Waard / (Australia) Marc Polmans (quarterfinals)
2. (Australia) Alex Bolt / (Australia) Andrew Whittington (final)
3. (Australia) Bradley Mousley / (Australia) Luke Saville (champions)
4. (Australia) Jarryd Chaplin / (New Zealand) Ben McLachlan (semifinals)

== Draw ==
=== Key ===
- Q = Qualifier
- WC = Wild card
- LL = Lucky loser
- Alt = Alternate
- SE = Special exempt
- PR = Protected ranking
- ITF = ITF entry
- JE = Junior exempt
- w/o = Walkover
- r = Retired
- d = Defaulted
- SR = Special ranking

First round
(Australia) H Bourchier (Australia) J Frawley | 6^{4} | 1
(United Kingdom) B Klein (Australia) D Propoggia | 7^{7} | 6
3 | (Australia) B Mousley (Australia) L Saville | 4 | 6 | [10]
(Kazakhstan) D Popko (Chinese Taipei) T-h Yang | 6 | 0 | [3]
(Australia) J Beale (Australia) Darren Polkinghorne | 2 | 6 | [10]
(Italy) R Bellotti (Slovenia) B Rola | 6 | 3 | [12]
(Philippines) R Gonzales (Japan) T Matsui | 6 | 4 | [9]
(Germany) S Fanselow (United States) JP Fruttero | 4 | 6 | [11]
(United States) E King (United States) N Pasha | 6^{4} | 4
4 | (Australia) Jarryd Chaplin (New Zealand) B McLachlan | 7^{7} | 6
(Australia) M Banes (Australia) S Puodziunas | 3 | 3
(United States) M Krueger (United States) D Nguyen | 6 | 6
(Switzerland) L Margaroli (Egypt) M Safwat | 3 | 6 | [8]
2 | (Australia) A Bolt (Australia) A Whittington | 6 | 3 | [10]

Quarterfinals
1 | (Australia) S de Waard (Australia) M Polmans | 6^{9} | 3
(United Kingdom) B Klein (Australia) D Propoggia | 7^{11} | 6
3 | (Australia) B Mousley (Australia) L Saville | 6 | 6
(Italy) R Bellotti (Slovenia) B Rola | 4 | 2
(Germany) S Fanselow (United States) JP Fruttero | 3 | 4
4 | (Australia) J Chaplin (New Zealand) B McLachlan | 6 | 6
(United States) M Krueger (United States) D Nguyen | 6 | 3 | [12]
2 | (Australia) A Bolt (Australia) A Whittington | 4 | 6 | [14]

Semifinals
(United Kingdom) B Klein (Australia) D Propoggia | 6 | 4 | [7]
3 | (Australia) B Mousley (Australia) L Saville | 3 | 6 | [10]
4 | (Australia) J Chaplin (New Zealand) B McLachlan | 2 | 6^{7}
2 | (Australia) A Bolt (Australia) A Whittington | 6 | 7^{9}

Final
3 | (Australia) B Mousley (Australia) L Saville | 6 | 6
2 | (Australia) A Bolt (Australia) A Whittington | 2 | 1
