= 2017 Launceston Tennis International =

- Date: 4-12 February
- Edition: 3rd (men); 6th (women)
- Category: ATP Challenger Tour (men); ITF Women's Circuit (women)
- Prize money: $75,000 / $60,000
- Surface: Hard
- Location: Launceston, Tasmania, Australia
- Venue: Launceston Regional Tennis Centre

Champions

Men's singles
- (United States) Noah Rubin

Women's singles
- (United States) Jamie Loeb

Men's doubles
- (Australia) Bradley Mousley / (Australia) Luke Saville

Women's doubles
- (Australia) Monique Adamczak / (United States) Nicole Melichar
| ← 2016 · | Launceston Tennis International | · 2018 → |

The 2017 Launceston Tennis International is a professional tennis tournament played on outdoor hard courts. It is the third edition (for men) and sixth edition (for women) of the tournament which was part of the 2017 ATP Challenger Tour and the 2017 ITF Women's Circuit, offering a total of $75,000 in prize money for men and $60,000 for women. It will take place in Launceston, Tasmania, Australia, on 4-12 February 2017.

== Men's singles entrants ==
=== Seeds ===
| Country | Player | Rank^{1} | Seed |
|---|---|---|---|
| JPN | Go Soeda | 138 | 1 |
| CZE | Jan Šátral | 157 | 2 |
| TPE | Jason Jung | 166 | 3 |
| AUS | Andrew Whittington | 169 | 4 |
| ~~AUS~~ | ~~Sam Groth~~ | ~~182~~ | ~~5~~ |
| EGY | Mohamed Safwat | 200 | 6 |
| USA | Noah Rubin | 202 | 7 |
| JPN | Akira Santillan | 207 | 8 |

- ^{1} Rankings as of January 30, 2017.

=== Other entrants ===
The following players received wildcards into the singles main draw:

- (Australia) Maverick Banes
- (Australia) Alex Bolt
- (Australia) Harry Bourchier
- (Australia) Daniel Nolan

The following players received entry from the qualifying draw:

- (Germany) Sebastian Fanselow
- (Australia) James Frawley
- (Australia) Bradley Mousley
- (Chinese Taipei) Yang Tsung-hua

The following players received entry as lucky losers:

- (Switzerland) Luca Margaroli
- (United States) Nathan Pasha

== Women's singles entrants ==
=== Seeds ===
| Country | Player | Rank^{1} | Seed |
|---|---|---|---|
| CHN | Han Xinyun | 119 | 1 |
| USA | Taylor Townsend | 125 | 2 |
| CHN | Liu Fangzhou | 137 | 3 |
| SLO | Tamara Zidanšek | 163 | 4 |
| USA | Asia Muhammad | 165 | 5 |
| USA | Jamie Loeb | 173 | 6 |
| AUS | Lizette Cabrera | 187 | 7 |
| JPN | Miyu Kato | 188 | 8 |

=== Other entrants ===
The following players received wildcards into the singles main draw:

- (Australia) Kimberly Birrell
- (Australia) Jaimee Fourlis
- (Australia) Maddison Inglis
- (Australia) Sally Peers

The following players received entry from the qualifying draw:

- (France) Tessah Andrianjafitrimo
- (Italy) Georgia Brescia
- (China) Tian Ran
- (China) Xu Yifan

== Champions ==
=== Men's singles ===
- (United States) Noah Rubin def. (United States) Mitchell Krueger 6–0, 6–1.

=== Women's singles ===
- (United States) Jamie Loeb def. (Slovenia) Tamara Zidanšek, 7–6^{(7–4)}, 6–3

=== Men's doubles ===
- (Australia) Bradley Mousley / (Australia) Luke Saville def. (Australia) Alex Bolt / (Australia) Andrew Whittington 6–2, 6–1.

=== Women's doubles ===
- (Australia) Monique Adamczak / (United States) Nicole Melichar def. (Italy) Georgia Brescia / (Slovenia) Tamara Zidanšek, 6–1, 6–2
