= Georgia Brescia =

Italian tennis player

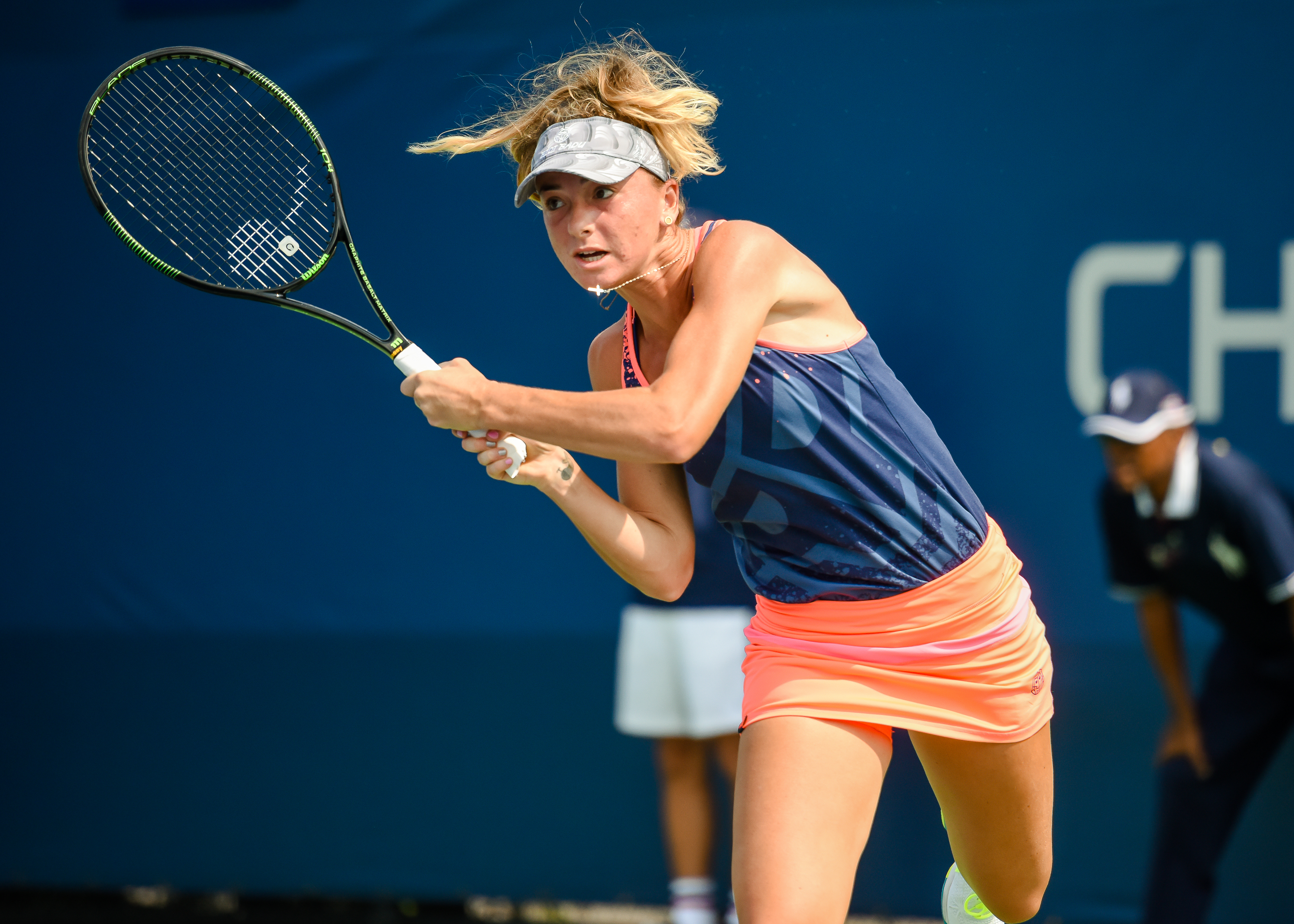
- Brescia in 2017
- Country (sports): Italy
- Born: 8 February 1996 (age 30) Italy
- Prize money: $117,420

Singles
- Career record: 212–136
- Career titles: 9 ITF
- Highest ranking: No. 184 (23 October 2017)

Doubles
- Career record: 85–82
- Career titles: 5 ITF
- Highest ranking: No. 293 (23 October 2017)

Georgia Brescia (born 8 February 1996) is an Italian former tennis player.

== Career ==
Brescia reached position 107 in the Under-18 level. She played primarily on the ITF Women's World Tennis Tour, winning her first ITF title at the age of 19. Between 2014 and 2017, she won nine singles and five doubles titles. She preferred hard courts and has a two-handed forehand. On 23 October 2017, she achieved her best singles ranking of world number 184.

Brescia announced her retirement from tennis in 2020. She is now a wedding planner.

== Tournament wins ==
=== Singles ===
Legend $25,000 tournaments $10,000 tournaments

Result	Date	Tournament	Tier	Surface	Opponent	Score
Win	Sep 2014	ITF Santa Margherita di Pula, Italy	10,000	Clay	(Australia) Alexandra Nancarrow	6–3, 6–3
Win	Apr 2015	ITF Santa Margherita di Pula	10,000	Clay	(Italy) Alice Balducci	6–3, 3–6, 6–4
Win	Aug 2015	ITF Caslano, Switzerland	10,000	Clay	(Netherlands) Eva Wacanno	6–4, 6–1
Win	Sep 2015	ITF Duino-Aurisina, Italy	10,000	Clay	(Hungary) Vanda Lukács	3–6, 7–6^{(4)}, 6–1
Win	Dec 2015	ITF Ortisei, Italy	10,000	Hard (i)	(Liechtenstein) Kathinka von Deichmann	6–4, 4–6, 6–3
Win	Aug 2016	ITF Oldenzaal, Netherlands	10,000	Clay	(United States) Chiara Scholl	6–2, 3–6, 6–4
Win	Aug 2016	ITF Caslano, Switzerland	10,000	Clay	(Italy) Cristiana Ferrando	6–4, 3–1
Win	Apr 2017	ITF Santa Margherita di Pula	25,000	Clay	(United States) Bernarda Pera	6–1, 6–2
Win	Jun 2017	ITF Lenzerheide, Switzerland	25,000	Clay	(Switzerland) Simona Waltert	0–6, 6–4, 7–6^{(1)}

=== Doubles ===
Result	Date	Tournament	Tier	Surface	Partner	Opponents	Score
Win	Sep 2014	ITF Santa Margherita di Pula, Italy	10,000	Clay	(Italy) Alice Balducci	(Belgium) Marie Benoît (Belgium) Kimberley Zimmermann	3–6, 6–0, [10–5]
Win	Nov 2014	ITF Santa Margherita di Pula, Italy	10,000	Clay	(Switzerland) Lisa Sabino	(France) Camille Cheli (Italy) Marcella Cucca	6–4, 6–3
Win	Nov 2014	ITF Santa Margherita di Pula, Italy	10,000	Clay	(Italy) Martina Caregaro	(Switzerland) Lisa Sabino (Germany) Anne Schäfer	3–6, 6–4, [10–6]
Win	Mar 2016	ITF Hammamet, Tunisia	10,000	Clay	(Greece) Despina Papamichail	(Italy) Alice Balducci (Italy) Claudia Giovine	4–6, 6–2, [10–7]
Win	Jul 2016	ITF Savitaipale, Finland	10,000	Clay	(Russia) Kseniia Bekker	(Netherlands) Chayenne Ewijk (Netherlands) Rosalie van der Hoek	4–6, 6–4, [10–5]
