= 2018 Latrobe City Traralgon ATP Challenger – Singles =

Singles
- 2018 Latrobe City Traralgon ATP Challenger

Final
- Champion: (Australia) Jordan Thompson
- Runner-up: (Japan) Yoshihito Nishioka
- Score: 6–3, 6–4

Events
Singles	Doubles
← 2017 ·	Latrobe City Traralgon ATP Challenger	· 2019 →

Jason Kubler was the defending champion but lost in the second round to Brydan Klein.

Jordan Thompson won the title after defeating Yoshihito Nishioka 6–3, 6–4 in the final.

== Seeds ==
1. (Australia) Jason Kubler (second round)
2. (Japan) Yoshihito Nishioka (final)
3. (Australia) Jordan Thompson (champion)
4. (Australia) Alex Bolt (semifinals)
5. (Australia) Marc Polmans (semifinals)
6. (Japan) Hiroki Moriya (second round)
7. (Japan) Yasutaka Uchiyama (quarterfinals)
8. (France) Maxime Janvier (second round)

== Draw ==
=== Key ===
- Q = Qualifier
- WC = Wild card
- LL = Lucky loser
- Alt = Alternate
- SE = Special exempt
- PR = Protected ranking
- ITF = ITF entry
- JE = Junior exempt
- w/o = Walkover
- r = Retired
- d = Defaulted
- SR = Special ranking

=== Finals ===
Semifinals
5	(Australia) Marc Polmans	0	6	0
3	(Australia) Jordan Thompson	6	4	6
4	(Australia) Alex Bolt	5	4
2	(Japan) Yoshihito Nishioka	7	6

Final
3	(Australia) Jordan Thompson	6	6
2	(Japan) Yoshihito Nishioka	3	4

=== Top half ===
First round
1	(Australia) J Kubler	7^{7}	6
(Germany) B Hassan	6^{3}	1
(Australia) J Beale	6^{7}	6^{5}
Q	(United Kingdom) B Klein	7^{9}	7^{7}
(Australia) M Banes	6	6
(Zimbabwe) B Lock	3	4
(Australia) M Purcell	3	6^{5}
5	(Australia) M Polmans	6	7^{7}
3	(Australia) J Thompson	6	6
(Italy) Alessandro Petrone	1	1
LL	(United Kingdom) E Hoyt	7	3	6
(Australia) B Ellis	5	6	4
WC	(Australia) A Vukic	4	7^{8}	6
Q	(Chinese Taipei) T-l Wu	6	6^{6}	4
(Spain) N Kuhn	6	5	4
8	(France) M Janvier	3	7	6

Second round
1	(Australia) J Kubler	4	7^{7}	3
Q	(United Kingdom) B Klein	6	6^{4}	6
(Australia) M Banes	3	7	3
5	(Australia) M Polmans	6	5	6
3	(Australia) J Thompson	6	6
LL	(United Kingdom) E Hoyt	4	4
WC	(Australia) A Vukic	6	3	7^{7}
8	(France) M Janvier	2	6	6^{4}

Quarterfinals
Q	(United Kingdom) B Klein	3	4
5	(Australia) M Polmans	6	6
3	(Australia) J Thompson	6	6
WC	(Australia) A Vukic	2	3

Semifinals
5	(Australia) M Polmans	0	6	0
3	(Australia) J Thompson	6	4	6

=== Bottom half ===
First round
6	(Japan) H Moriya	6^{4}	7^{8}	6
(Australia) L Saville	7^{7}	6^{6}	3
(Germany) S Fanselow	6	6
WC	(Australia) Jacob Grills	3	3
(Belgium) Y Mertens	6	6^{6}	7^{7}
WC	(Australia) H Bourchier	3	7^{8}	6^{2}
(Australia) B Mousley	2	6^{3}
4	(Australia) A Bolt	6	7^{7}
7	(Japan) Y Uchiyama	7^{7}	6
Q	(France) F Reboul	6^{5}	0
(Australia) A Santillan	7^{7}	6
(Australia) J Duckworth	6^{2}	3
(France) S Doumbia	3	6	6
Q	(Japan) Yo Watanuki	6	3	3
WC	(Australia) T Fancutt	3	6^{4}
2	(Japan) Y Nishioka	6	7^{7}

Second round
6	(Japan) H Moriya	6	3	2
(Germany) S Fanselow	1	6	6
(Belgium) Y Mertens	5	1
4	(Australia) A Bolt	7	6
7	(Japan) Y Uchiyama	7^{7}	4	6
(Australia) A Santillan	6^{3}	6	3
(France) S Doumbia	1	4
2	(Japan) Y Nishioka	6	6

Quarterfinals
(Germany) S Fanselow	5	6	4
4	(Australia) A Bolt	7	3	6
7	(Japan) Y Uchiyama	1	6	1
2	(Japan) Y Nishioka	6	4	6

Semifinals
4	(Australia) A Bolt	5	4
2	(Japan) Y Nishioka	7	6
