= 2018 Latrobe City Traralgon ATP Challenger – Doubles =

Doubles
- 2018 Latrobe City Traralgon ATP Challenger

Final
- Champions: (Australia) Jeremy Beale (Australia) Marc Polmans
- Runners-up: (Australia) Max Purcell (Australia) Luke Saville
- Score: 6–2, 6–4

Events
Singles	Doubles
← 2017 ·	Latrobe City Traralgon ATP Challenger	· 2019 →

Alex Bolt and Bradley Mousley were the defending champions but only Mousley chose to defend his title, partnering Akira Santillan. Mousley lost in the first round to Adam and Jason Taylor.

Jeremy Beale and Marc Polmans won the title after defeating Max Purcell and Luke Saville 6–2, 6–4 in the final.

== Seeds ==
1. (Australia) Max Purcell / (Australia) Luke Saville (final)
2. (Zimbabwe) Benjamin Lock / (New Zealand) Rubin Statham (first round)
3. (Australia) Bradley Mousley / (Australia) Akira Santillan (first round)
4. (United Kingdom) Brydan Klein / (Australia) Scott Puodziunas (semifinals)

== Draw ==
=== Key ===
- Q = Qualifier
- WC = Wild card
- LL = Lucky loser
- Alt = Alternate
- SE = Special exempt
- PR = Protected ranking
- ITF = ITF entry
- JE = Junior exempt
- w/o = Walkover
- r = Retired
- d = Defaulted
- SR = Special ranking

First round
1	(Australia) M Purcell (Australia) L Saville	4	6	[10]
(Italy) Alessandro Petrone (Italy) Francesco Vilardo	6	3	[5]
(Japan) Y Nishioka (Japan) Yo Watanuki	6	6
WC	(Australia) Thomas Bosancic (Australia) H Bourchier	1	1
4	(United Kingdom) B Klein (Australia) S Puodziunas	6	6
WC	(Australia) Jayden Court (Australia) Alexander Crnokrak	3	2
(Spain) N Kuhn (Belgium) Y Mertens	6	7
(Germany) S Fanselow (Germany) B Hassan	2	5
(Australia) J Beale (Australia) M Polmans	6	6
(Australia) M Banes (Australia) B Ellis	4	1
(Australia) A Taylor (Australia) J Taylor	3	6	[10]
3	(Australia) B Mousley (Australia) A Santillan	6	3	[8]
WC	(Australia) Jacob Grills (Australia) A Vukic	6	3	[10]
(France) S Doumbia (France) F Reboul	4	6	[3]
(Australia) T Fancutt (France) M Janvier	6	6
2	(Zimbabwe) B Lock (New Zealand) R Statham	3	4

Quarterfinals
1	(Australia) M Purcell (Australia) L Saville	6	3	[10]
(Japan) Y Nishioka (Japan) Yo Watanuki	4	6	[8]
4	(United Kingdom) B Klein (Australia) S Puodziunas	2	6	[10]
(Spain) N Kuhn (Belgium) Y Mertens	6	3	[8]
(Australia) J Beale (Australia) M Polmans	6	6
(Australia) A Taylor (Australia) J Taylor	1	3
WC	(Australia) J Grills (Australia) A Vukic	2	4
(Australia) T Fancutt (France) M Janvier	6	6

Semifinals
1	(Australia) M Purcell (Australia) L Saville	6^{7}	7	[10]
4	(United Kingdom) B Klein (Australia) S Puodziunas	7^{9}	5	[8]
(Australia) J Beale (Australia) M Polmans	7^{7}	6
(Australia) T Fancutt (France) M Janvier	6^{5}	4

Final
1	(Australia) M Purcell (Australia) L Saville	2	4
(Australia) J Beale (Australia) M Polmans	6	6
