= 2015 Latrobe City Traralgon ATP Challenger – Singles =

Tennis tournament results

Singles
- 2015 Latrobe City Traralgon ATP Challenger

Final
- Champion: (Australia) Matthew Ebden
- Runner-up: (Australia) Jordan Thompson
- Score: 7–5, 6–3

Events
Singles	Doubles
- Latrobe City Traralgon ATP Challenger

Matthew Ebden took the title, beating countryman Jordan Thompson 7–5, 6–3

== Seeds ==
1. (Australia) Matthew Ebden (champion)
2. (Australia) Jordan Thompson (final)
3. (United Kingdom) Brydan Klein (semifinals)
4. (Australia) Luke Saville (first round)
5. (United States) Connor Smith (second round)
6. (China) Li Zhe (quarterfinals)
7. (Australia) Alex Bolt (quarterfinals)
8. (Australia) Marinko Matosevic (first round)

== Draw ==
Key

- Q = Qualifier
- WC = Wild card
- LL = Lucky loser
- Alt = Alternate
- ITF = ITF entry
- PR = Protected ranking
- SR = Special ranking
- SE = Special exempt
- JE = Junior exempt
- JR = Junior Accelerator Programme entrant
- CO = College Accelerator Programme entrant
- NG = Next Gen Accelerator Program entrant
- w/o = Walkover
- r = Retired
- d = Defaulted

=== Finals ===
Semifinals
1	(Australia) Matthew Ebden	6	6
(Australia) Matthew Barton	4	4
3	(United Kingdom) Brydan Klein	2	5
2	(Australia) Jordan Thompson	6	7

Final
1	(Australia) Matthew Ebden	7	6
2	(Australia) Jordan Thompson	5	3

=== Top half ===
First round
1	(Australia) M Ebden	6	6
(New Zealand) F Tearney	2	0
WC	(Australia) T Fancutt	1	2
(Australia) M Banes	6	6
(Australia) B Mousley	7^{14}	^{9}
Q	(Germany) S Fanselow	6^{12}	6^{7}
(Australia) A Whittington	6^{5}	4
6	(China) Z Li	7^{7}	6
4	(Australia) L Saville	6^{5}	6^{8}
(Australia) M Barton	7^{7}	7^{10}
(Australia) M Reid	5
(Australia) Gavin van Peperzeel	0^{r}
(New Zealand) J Statham	6	6
(Australia) D Propoggia	1	1
LL	(Australia) O Anderson	4	6	6^{5}
5	(United States) Connor Smith	6	1	7^{7}

Second round
1	(Australia) M Ebden	6	6
(Australia) M Banes	4	2
(Australia) B Mousley	3	4
6	(China) Z Li	6	6
(Australia) M Barton	6	7^{7}
(Australia) M Reid	1	6^{5}
(New Zealand) J Statham	6	6
5	(United States) C Smith	3	4

Quarterfinals
1	(Australia) M Ebden	6	6
6	(China) Z Li	4	4
(Australia) M Barton	6	6
(New Zealand) J Statham	3	2

Semifinals
1	(Australia) M Ebden	6	6
(Australia) M Barton	4	4

=== Bottom half ===
First round
8/Q	(Australia) M Matosevic	3	1
(Australia) B Mitchell	6	6
Q	(Czech Republic) Robin Stanek	6	7^{7}
(United States) N Meister	4	6^{1}
(Australia) D Kelly	6	6
(Australia) C O'Connell	4	4
(Australia) O Jasika	6^{5}	4
3	(United Kingdom) B Klein	7^{7}	6
7	(Australia) A Bolt	7^{7}	7
(United States) M Giron	6^{4}	5
WC	(Australia) B Mott	6	0
(India) J Nedunchezhiyan	0	0^{r}
WC	(Australia) Jacob Grills	7	6
(Australia) H Bourchier	5	3
PR	(Australia) G Jones	6^{13}	1
2	(Australia) J Thompson	7^{15}	6

Second round
(Australia) B Mitchell	3	6	6
Q	(Czech Republic) R Stanek	2	2	2
(Australia) D Kelly	3	6	3
3	(United Kingdom) B Klein	6	3	6
7	(Australia) A Bolt	6	3	6
WC	(Australia) B Mott	4	6	4
(Australia) J Grills	5	4
2	(Australia) J Thompson	7	6

Quarterfinals
(Australia) B Mitchell	1	2
3	(United Kingdom) B Klein	6	6
7	(Australia) A Bolt	7^{7}	2	6^{4}
2	(Australia) J Thompson	6^{3}	6	7^{7}

Semifinals
3	(United Kingdom) B Klein	2	5
2	(Australia) J Thompson	6	7
