= 2017 Latrobe City Traralgon ATP Challenger – Doubles =

Doubles
- 2017 Latrobe City Traralgon ATP Challenger

Final
- Champions: (Australia) Alex Bolt (Australia) Bradley Mousley
- Runners-up: (United States) Evan King (United States) Nathan Pasha
- Score: 6–4, 6–2

Events
Singles	Doubles
- Latrobe City Traralgon ATP Challenger

Matt Reid and John-Patrick Smith were the defending champions but only Reid chose to defend his title, partnering Steven de Waard. Reid lost in the first round to Andrew Harris and Christopher O'Connell.

Alex Bolt and Bradley Mousley won the title after defeating Evan King and Nathan Pasha 6–4, 6–2 in the final.

== Seeds ==
1. (Australia) Steven de Waard / (Australia) Matt Reid (first round)
2. (Australia) Luke Saville / (Australia) Andrew Whittington (semifinals)
3. (Australia) Alex Bolt / (Australia) Bradley Mousley (champions)
4. (Australia) Thanasi Kokkinakis / (Australia) Jordan Thompson (quarterfinals, withdrew)

== Draw ==
Key

- Q = Qualifier
- WC = Wild card
- LL = Lucky loser
- Alt = Alternate
- ITF = ITF entry
- PR = Protected ranking
- SR = Special ranking
- SE = Special exempt
- JE = Junior exempt
- JR = Junior Accelerator Programme entrant
- CO = College Accelerator Programme entrant
- NG = Next Gen Accelerator Program entrant
- w/o = Walkover
- r = Retired
- d = Defaulted

First round
1	(Australia) S de Waard (Australia) M Reid	1	5
PR	(Australia) A Harris (Australia) C O'Connell	6	7
WC	(Australia) Jacob Grills (Australia) B Mitchell	2	1
WC	(Australia) J Kubler (Australia) Daniel Nolan	6	6
3	(Australia) A Bolt (Australia) B Mousley	6	7^{7}
(Australia) M Banes (Australia) Gavin van Peperzeel	3	6^{4}
(Germany) S Fanselow (United States) A Sarkissian	6	5	[5]
WC	(Australia) B Ellis (Australia) C Puttergill	4	7	[10]
(Philippines) F Alcantara (Netherlands) S Verbeek	3	7^{7}	[0]
(United States) E King (United States) N Pasha	6	6^{2}	[10]
(Austria) L Miedler (Australia) S Puodziunas	7	3	[5]
4	(Australia) T Kokkinakis (Australia) J Thompson	5	6	[10]
(United Kingdom) B Klein (Australia) D Propoggia	6^{6}	4
(Australia) H Bourchier (Australia) D Kelly	7^{8}	6
(United States) M Krueger (United States) N Rubin	6^{7}	2
2	(Australia) L Saville (Australia) A Whittington	7^{9}	6

Quarterfinals
PR	(Australia) A Harris (Australia) C O'Connell	6	2	[8]
WC	(Australia) J Kubler (Australia) D Nolan	3	6	[10]
3	(Australia) A Bolt (Australia) B Mousley	6	6
WC	(Australia) B Ellis (Australia) C Puttergill	4	2
(United States) E King (United States) N Pasha	w/o
4	(Australia) T Kokkinakis (Australia) J Thompson
(Australia) H Bourchier (Australia) D Kelly	2	1
2	(Australia) L Saville (Australia) A Whittington	6	6

Semifinals
WC	(Australia) J Kubler (Australia) D Nolan	1	3
3	(Australia) A Bolt (Australia) B Mousley	6	6
(United States) E King (United States) N Pasha	4	6	[10]
2	(Australia) L Saville (Australia) A Whittington	6	2	[3]

Final
3	(Australia) A Bolt (Australia) B Mousley	6	6
(United States) E King (United States) N Pasha	4	2
