= 2015 Latrobe City Traralgon ATP Challenger – Doubles =

Doubles
- 2015 Latrobe City Traralgon ATP Challenger

Final
- Champions: (Australia) Dayne Kelly (Australia) Marinko Matosevic
- Runners-up: (Australia) Omar Jasika (Australia) Bradley Mousley
- Score: 7–5, 6–2

Events
Singles	Doubles
- Latrobe City Traralgon ATP Challenger

Dayne Kelly and Marinko Matosevic won the title, beating Omar Jasika and Bradley Mousley 7–5, 6–2

== Seeds ==
1. (India) Jeevan Nedunchezhiyan / (United States) Matt Seeberger (first round)
2. (China) Li Zhe / (New Zealand) Jose Rubin Statham (quarterfinals)
3. (United Kingdom) Brydan Klein / (Australia) Dane Propoggia (semifinals)
4. (Australia) Luke Saville / (Australia) Andrew Whittington (first round)

== Draw ==
Key

- Q = Qualifier
- WC = Wild card
- LL = Lucky loser
- Alt = Alternate
- ITF = ITF entry
- PR = Protected ranking
- SR = Special ranking
- SE = Special exempt
- JE = Junior exempt
- JR = Junior Accelerator Programme entrant
- CO = College Accelerator Programme entrant
- NG = Next Gen Accelerator Program entrant
- w/o = Walkover
- r = Retired
- d = Defaulted

=== Draw ===
First round
1	(India) J Nedunchezhiyan (United States) M Seeberger	6	3	[8]
WC	(Australia) T Fancutt (Australia) Darren Polkinghorne	3	6	[10]
(Australia) O Jasika (Australia) B Mousley	6	2	[11]
(Australia) S de Waard (Australia) M Polmans	3	6	[9]
3	(United Kingdom) B Klein (Australia) D Propoggia	6	6
(Australia) B Mitchell (Australia) J Thompson	4	3
WC	(Australia) Jake Eames (Australia) C O'Connell	7	2	[10]
(Australia) M Barton (Australia) M Ebden	5	6	[5]
(Australia) H Bourchier (Czech Republic) Robin Stanek	5	1
(Australia) M Reid (United States) Connor Smith	7	6
(United States) M Giron (United States) N Meister	6	6
4	(Australia) L Saville (Australia) A Whittington	2	3
WC	(Australia) D Kelly (Australia) M Matosevic	6	7
(Australia) M Banes (Australia) Gavin van Peperzeel	2	5
Alt	(Germany) S Fanselow (New Zealand) F Tearney	2	2
2	(China) Z Li (New Zealand) J R Statham	6	6

Quarterfinals
(Australia) T Fancutt (Australia) D Polkinghorne	5	6	[8]
(Australia) O Jasika (Australia) B Mousley	7	4	[10]
3	(United Kingdom) B Klein (Australia) D Propoggia	6	6
WC	(Australia) J Eames (Australia) C O'Connell	3	4
(Australia) M Reid (United States) C Smith	4	6	[10]
(United States) M Giron (United States) N Meister	6	2	[7]
WC	(Australia) D Kelly (Australia) M Matosevic	7	7^{7}
2	(China) Z Li (New Zealand) J R Statham	5	6^{5}

Semifinals
(Australia) O Jasika (Australia) B Mousley	7^{7}	6
3	(United Kingdom) B Klein (Australia) D Propoggia	6^{3}	3
(Australia) M Reid (United States) C Smith	6	6^{2}	[5]
WC	(Australia) D Kelly (Australia) M Matosevic	2	7^{7}	[10]

Final
(Australia) O Jasika (Australia) B Mousley	5	2
WC	(Australia) D Kelly (Australia) M Matosevic	7	6
