= 2017 Latrobe City Traralgon ATP Challenger – Singles =

Singles
- 2017 Latrobe City Traralgon ATP Challenger

Final
- Champion: (Australia) Jason Kubler
- Runner-up: (Australia) Alex Bolt
- Score: 2–6, 7–6^{(8–6)}, 7–6^{(7–3)}

Events
| Singles | Doubles |
- Latrobe City Traralgon ATP Challenger

Jordan Thompson was the defending champion but retired in the second round against Maverick Banes.

Jason Kubler won the title after defeating Alex Bolt 2–6, 7–6^{(8–6)}, 7–6^{(7–3)} in the final.

== Seeds ==
1. (Australia) Jordan Thompson (second round, retired)
2. (Australia) Matthew Ebden (semifinals)
3. (Japan) Taro Daniel (first round)
4. (United States) Mitchell Krueger (first round)
5. (United States) Noah Rubin (quarterfinals)
6. (United States) Evan King (quarterfinals)
7. (Australia) Dayne Kelly (first round)
8. (United Kingdom) Brydan Klein (second round)

== Draw ==
Key

- Q = Qualifier
- WC = Wild card
- LL = Lucky loser
- Alt = Alternate
- ITF = ITF entry
- PR = Protected ranking
- SR = Special ranking
- SE = Special exempt
- JE = Junior exempt
- JR = Junior Accelerator Programme entrant
- CO = College Accelerator Programme entrant
- NG = Next Gen Accelerator Program entrant
- w/o = Walkover
- r = Retired
- d = Defaulted

=== Finals ===
Semifinals
(Australia) Maverick Banes | 3 | 3
(Australia) Alex Bolt | 6 | 6
Q | (Australia) Jason Kubler | 6 | 6
2 | (Australia) Matthew Ebden | 2 | 2

Final
(Australia) Alex Bolt | 6 | 6^{6} | 6^{3}
Q | (Australia) Jason Kubler | 2 | 7^{8} | 7^{7}

=== Top half ===
First round
1 | (Australia) J Thompson | 6 | 3
(Poland) M Przysiężny | 1 | 0^{r}
(Australia) M Banes | 6 | 7
(Australia) H Bourchier | 0 | 5
Q | (Austria) L Miedler | 5
(Republic of Ireland) S Barry | 2^{r}
(Australia) L Saville | 1 | 3
6 | (United States) E King | 6 | 6
4 | (United States) M Krueger | 1 | 2
PR | (Australia) A Harris | 6 | 6
(Australia) A Bolt | 5 | 7 | 6
(India) S Mukund | 7 | 5 | 4
(United States) A Sarkissian | 6 | 6
Q | (Australia) Gavin van Peperzeel | 1 | 4
WC | (Australia) B Ellis | 5 | 2
8 | (United Kingdom) B Klein | 7 | 6

Second round
1 | (Australia) J Thompson | 3 | 0^{r}
(Australia) M Banes | 6 | 3
Q | (Austria) L Miedler | 2 | 2
6 | (United States) E King | 6 | 6
PR | (Australia) A Harris | 2 | 2
(Australia) A Bolt | 6 | 6
(United States) A Sarkissian | 6 | 6
8 | (United Kingdom) B Klein | 3 | 4

Quarterfinals
(Australia) M Banes | 6 | 6
6 | (United States) E King | 3 | 4
(Australia) A Bolt | 7 | 4 | 6
(United States) A Sarkissian | 5 | 6 | 4

Semifinals
(Australia) M Banes | 3 | 3
(Australia) A Bolt | 6 | 6

=== Bottom half ===
First round
7 | (Australia) D Kelly | 3 | 6^{8}
(Germany) S Fanselow | 6 | 7^{10}
(Australia) B Mousley | 2 | 7^{7} | 6
(Brazil) A Ghem | 6 | 6^{1} | 2
(Australia) A Whittington | 6 | 6
WC | (Australia) Matthew Dellavedova | 0 | 3
Q | (Australia) J Kubler | 6 | 6
3 | (Japan) T Daniel | 2 | 4
5 | (United States) N Rubin | 7^{7} | 6
WC | (Australia) B Mitchell | 6^{1} | 3
(Thailand) W Trongcharoenchaikul | 6 | 6
WC | (Australia) Jacob Grills | 2 | 4
Q | (Netherlands) S Verbeek | 3 | 6 | 4
Alt | (Australia) C O'Connell | 6 | 4 | 6
PR | (Australia) D Propoggia | 1 | 1
2 | (Australia) M Ebden | 6 | 6

Second round
(Germany) S Fanselow | 6 | 1 | 6^{4}
(Australia) B Mousley | 2 | 6 | 7^{7}
(Australia) A Whittington | 2 | 2
Q | (Australia) J Kubler | 6 | 6
5 | (United States) N Rubin | 7 | 6
(Thailand) W Trongcharoenchaikul | 5 | 4
Alt | (Australia) C O'Connell | 4 | 6 | 2
2 | (Australia) M Ebden | 6 | 4 | 6

Quarterfinals
(Australia) B Mousley | 6^{4} | 6 | 3
Q | (Australia) J Kubler | 7^{7} | 4 | 6
5 | (United States) N Rubin | 6 | 5 | 4
2 | (Australia) M Ebden | 4 | 7 | 6

Semifinals
Q | (Australia) J Kubler | 6 | 6
2 | (Australia) M Ebden | 2 | 2
