= 2014 Latrobe City Traralgon ATP Challenger 2 – Doubles =

Doubles
- 2014 Latrobe City Traralgon ATP Challenger 2

Final
- Champions: (United Kingdom) Brydan Klein (Australia) Dane Propoggia
- Runners-up: (New Zealand) Marcus Daniell (New Zealand) Artem Sitak
- Score: 7–6^{(8–6)}, 3–6, [10–6]

Events
Singles	Doubles
← 2014 ·	Latrobe City Traralgon ATP Challenger	· 2015 →

Ryan Agar and Adam Feeney were the Traralgon Champions from 2013, but he did not defend their title, while Brydan Klein and Dane Propoggia were the defending Traralgon Champion, having won the first of two challengers held in this place in 2014, and successfully defended their title defeating Marcus Daniell and Artem Sitak in the final, 7–6^{(8–6)}, 3–6, [10–6].

== Seeds ==
1. (New Zealand) Marcus Daniell / (New Zealand) Artem Sitak (final)
2. (Australia) Alex Bolt / (Australia) Andrew Whittington (semifinals)
3. (China) Gong Maoxin / (Chinese Taipei) Peng Hsien-yin (quarterfinals)
4. (Chinese Taipei) Chen Ti / (Chinese Taipei) Huang Liang-chi (semifinals)

== Draw ==
=== Key ===
- Q = Qualifier
- WC = Wild card
- LL = Lucky loser
- Alt = Alternate
- SE = Special exempt
- PR = Protected ranking
- ITF = ITF entry
- JE = Junior exempt
- w/o = Walkover
- r = Retired
- d = Defaulted
- SR = Special ranking

First round
1	(New Zealand) M Daniell (New Zealand) A Sitak	w/o
(United States) B Klahn (Australia) M Reid
(Australia) S de Waard (Australia) C Puttergill	1	5
(Australia) A Hubble (New Zealand) J Statham	6	7
4	(Chinese Taipei) T Chen (Chinese Taipei) L-c Huang	6	6
(China) Y Bai (China) C Wang	2	2
WC	(Australia) O Jasika (Australia) J Thompson	7^{9}	6
(Australia) Jake Eames (Australia) C O'Connell	6^{7}	4
(Australia) M Banes (Australia) Gavin van Peperzeel	0	1
(United Kingdom) B Klein (Australia) D Propoggia	6	6
(Australia) Jarryd Chaplin (United States) N Meister	3	4
3	(China) M Gong (Chinese Taipei) H-y Peng	6	6
WC	(Australia) Darren Polkinghorne (Australia) S Puodziunas	6	5	[7]
(China) D Wu (Chinese Taipei) T-h Yang	2	7	[10]
(United States) J Jenkins (United States) M Krueger	6	3	[8]
2	(Australia) A Bolt (Australia) A Whittington	2	6	[10]

Quarterfinals
1	(New Zealand) M Daniell (New Zealand) A Sitak	2	7	[10]
(Australia) A Hubble (New Zealand) J Statham	6	5	[6]
4	(Chinese Taipei) T Chen (Chinese Taipei) L-c Huang	3	7^{7}	[10]
WC	(Australia) O Jasika (Australia) J Thompson	6	6^{2}	[5]
(United Kingdom) B Klein (Australia) D Propoggia	6	6
3	(China) M Gong (Chinese Taipei) H-y Peng	2	4
(China) D Wu (Chinese Taipei) T-h Yang	4	3
2	(Australia) A Bolt (Australia) A Whittington	6	6

Semifinals
1	(New Zealand) M Daniell (New Zealand) A Sitak	6	6
4	(Chinese Taipei) T Chen (Chinese Taipei) L-c Huang	3	2
(United Kingdom) B Klein (Australia) D Propoggia	6	6
2	(Australia) A Bolt (Australia) A Whittington	2	3

Final
1	(New Zealand) M Daniell (New Zealand) A Sitak	6^{6}	6	[6]
(United Kingdom) B Klein (Australia) D Propoggia	7^{8}	3	[10]
