= 2014 Latrobe City Traralgon ATP Challenger 2 – Singles =

Singles
- 2014 Latrobe City Traralgon ATP Challenger 2

Final
- Champion: (Australia) John Millman
- Runner-up: (United Kingdom) James Ward
- Score: 6–4, 6–1

Events
Singles	Doubles
← 2014 ·	Latrobe City Traralgon ATP Challenger	· 2015 →

Yuki Bhambri was the Traralgon Champion from 2013, but he did not compete that year, while Bradley Klahn was current Traralgon Champion, having won the first of two challengers held in this place in 2014, but he lost to Benjamin Mitchell in the first round.
John Millman won the title, defeating James Ward in the final, 6–4, 6–1.

== Seeds ==
1. (Japan) Go Soeda (second round)
2. (United Kingdom) James Ward (final)
3. (United States) Bradley Klahn (first round)
4. (Japan) Hiroki Moriya (first round)
5. (Australia) Thanasi Kokkinakis (quarterfinals)
6. (Australia) Luke Saville (semifinals)
7. (Australia) Alex Bolt (second round)
8. (Chinese Taipei) Ti Chen (first round)

== Draw ==
=== Key ===
- Q = Qualifier
- WC = Wild card
- LL = Lucky loser
- Alt = Alternate
- SE = Special exempt
- PR = Protected ranking
- ITF = ITF entry
- JE = Junior exempt
- w/o = Walkover
- r = Retired
- d = Defaulted
- SR = Special ranking

=== Finals ===
Semifinals
6	(Australia) Luke Saville	1	2
(Australia) John Millman	6	6
(Australia) Benjamin Mitchell	5	2
2	(United Kingdom) James Ward	7	6

Final
(Australia) John Millman	6	6
2	(United Kingdom) James Ward	4	1

=== Top half ===
First round
1	(Japan) G Soeda	7^{7}	6
(Australia) D Propoggia	6^{5}	2
PR	(New Zealand) J Statham	4	7^{7}	6
Q	(New Zealand) M Daniell	6	6^{2}	2
(United States) J Jenkins	3	6	7
(Australia) M Reid	6	2	5
Q	(New Zealand) A Sitak	4	2
6	(Australia) L Saville	6	6
4	(Japan) H Moriya	6^{6}	1
(Australia) J Millman	7^{8}	6
Q	(China) Y Bai	6	7^{7}
(Australia) M Banes	4	6^{2}
WC	(Australia) Gavin van Peperzeel	6	4	1
(United Kingdom) K Edmund	4	6	6
(Chinese Taipei) T-H Yang	6	7^{8}
8	(Chinese Taipei) T Chen	4	6^{6}

Second round
1	(Japan) G Soeda	4	6	2
PR	(New Zealand) J Statham	6	4	6
(United States) J Jenkins	3	3
6	(Australia) L Saville	6	6
(Australia) J Millman	6	3
Q	(China) Y Bai	2	0^{r}
(United Kingdom) K Edmund	6	6
(Chinese Taipei) T-H Yang	2	2

Quarterfinals
PR	(New Zealand) J Statham	4	3
6	(Australia) L Saville	6	6
(Australia) J Millman	6	6
(United Kingdom) K Edmund	4	3

Semifinals
6	(Australia) L Saville	1	2
(Australia) J Millman	6	6

=== Bottom half ===
First round
7	(Australia) A Bolt	4	6	6
Q	(Australia) C O'Connell	6	1	4
(China) D Wu	7^{9}	4	5
(Australia) J-P Smith	6^{7}	6	7
(United States) N Meister	6	6
WC	(Australia) Darren Polkinghorne	2	2
(Australia) B Mitchell	6	2	6
3	(United States) B Klahn	4	6	4
5	(Australia) T Kokkinakis	6	2	6
PR	(Australia) G Jones	4	6	3
WC	(Australia) O Jasika	6	6
WC	(Australia) James Eames	4	1
(Australia) J Thompson	6	7
(Chinese Taipei) L-C Huang	2	5
(United Kingdom) B Klein	2	1
2	(United Kingdom) J Ward	6	6

Second round
7	(Australia) A Bolt	1	3
(Australia) J-P Smith	6	6
(United States) N Meister	3	1
(Australia) B Mitchell	6	6
5	(Australia) T Kokkinakis	6	6
WC	(Australia) O Jasika	1	4
(Australia) J Thompson	1	0^{r}
2	(United Kingdom) J Ward	6	1

Quarterfinals
(Australia) J-P Smith	6	6^{6}	2
(Australia) B Mitchell	4	7^{8}	6
5	(Australia) T Kokkinakis	5	5
2	(United Kingdom) J Ward	7	7

Semifinals
(Australia) B Mitchell	5	2
2	(United Kingdom) J Ward	7	6
