= 2019 Latrobe City Traralgon ATP Challenger – Doubles =

Doubles
- 2019 Latrobe City Traralgon ATP Challenger

Final
- Champions: (Australia) Max Purcell (Australia) Luke Saville
- Runners-up: (United Kingdom) Brydan Klein (Australia) Scott Puodziunas
- Score: 6–7^{(2–7)}, 6–3, [10–4]

Events
Singles	Doubles
← 2018 ·	Latrobe City Traralgon ATP Challenger	· 2022 →

Jeremy Beale and Marc Polmans were the defending champions but only Polmans chose to defend his title, partnering Evan King. Polmans lost in the first round to Marcelo Tomás Barrios Vera and Alejandro Tabilo.

Max Purcell and Luke Saville won the title after defeating Brydan Klein and Scott Puodziunas 6–7^{(2–7)}, 6–3, [10–4] in the final.

== Seeds ==
1. (Australia) Max Purcell / (Australia) Luke Saville (champions)
2. (United States) Evan King / (Australia) Marc Polmans (first round)
3. (Australia) Alex Bolt / (Australia) Matt Reid (quarterfinals)
4. (Thailand) Sanchai Ratiwatana / (Thailand) Sonchat Ratiwatana (quarterfinals)

== Draw ==
=== Key ===
- Q = Qualifier
- WC = Wild card
- LL = Lucky loser
- Alt = Alternate
- SE = Special exempt
- PR = Protected ranking
- ITF = ITF entry
- JE = Junior exempt
- w/o = Walkover
- r = Retired
- d = Defaulted
- SR = Special ranking

First round
1	(Australia) M Purcell (Australia) L Saville	6	6
WC	(Australia) A Taylor (Australia) J Taylor	3	1
(Switzerland) L Castelnuovo (Finland) H Heliövaara	4	4
(Australia) A Harris (Australia) A Santillan	6	6
3	(Australia) A Bolt (Australia) M Reid	6	3	[10]
(Japan) H Moriya (Japan) Yo Watanuki	3	6	[7]
WC	(Australia) C Puttergill (Australia) B Walkin	6	3	[10]
(Philippines) R Gonzales (Australia) A Vukic	4	6	[7]
WC	(Australia) T Schoolkate (Australia) D Sweeny	2	3
(United Kingdom) B Klein (Australia) S Puodziunas	6	6
(United Kingdom) J Clarke (Australia) Jacob Grills	3	6	[7]
4	(Thailand) Sa Ratiwatana (Thailand) So Ratiwatana	6	4	[10]
PR	(Australia) T Fancutt (Australia) B Mousley	3	6	[10]
(Australia) M Banes (Australia) H Bourchier	6	4	[5]
(Chile) MT Barrios Vera (Chile) A Tabilo	7^{7}	3	[10]
2	(United States) E King (Australia) M Polmans	6^{3}	6	[8]

Quarterfinals
1	(Australia) M Purcell (Australia) L Saville	w/o
(Australia) A Harris (Australia) A Santillan
3	(Australia) A Bolt (Australia) M Reid	4	4
WC	(Australia) C Puttergill (Australia) B Walkin	6	6
(United Kingdom) B Klein (Australia) S Puodziunas	1	6	[10]
4	(Thailand) Sa Ratiwatana (Thailand) So Ratiwatana	6	2	[6]
PR	(Australia) T Fancutt (Australia) B Mousley	4	6	[10]
(Chile) MT Barrios Vera (Chile) A Tabilo	6	3	[8]

Semifinals
1	(Australia) M Purcell (Australia) L Saville	6	6
WC	(Australia) C Puttergill (Australia) B Walkin	2	4
(United Kingdom) B Klein (Australia) S Puodziunas	6	6
PR	(Australia) T Fancutt (Australia) B Mousley	4	4

Final
1	(Australia) M Purcell (Australia) L Saville	6^{2}	6	[10]
(United Kingdom) B Klein (Australia) S Puodziunas	7^{7}	3	[4]
