= 2014 Latrobe City Traralgon ATP Challenger 1 – Singles =

Singles
- 2014 Latrobe City Traralgon ATP Challenger 1

Final
- Champion: (United States) Bradley Klahn
- Runner-up: (United States) Jarmere Jenkins
- Score: 7–6^{(7–5)}, 6–1

Events
| Singles | Doubles |
| ← 2013 · | Latrobe City Traralgon ATP Challenger | · 2014 → |

Yuki Bhambri was the defending champion, but he did not participate that year.
Bradley Klahn won the title, defeating Jarmere Jenkins in the final, 7–6^{(7–5)}, 6–1.

== Seeds ==
1. (Japan) Go Soeda (first round)
2. (United States) Bradley Klahn (champion)
3. (Australia) Matthew Ebden (first round)
4. (Japan) Hiroki Moriya (semifinals)
5. (Australia) Thanasi Kokkinakis (quarterfinals)
6. (Australia) Luke Saville (quarterfinals)
7. (Australia) Alex Bolt (second round)
8. (Chinese Taipei) Ti Chen (first round)

== Draw ==
=== Key ===
- Q = Qualifier
- WC = Wild card
- LL = Lucky loser
- Alt = Alternate
- SE = Special exempt
- PR = Protected ranking
- ITF = ITF entry
- JE = Junior exempt
- w/o = Walkover
- r = Retired
- d = Defaulted
- SR = Special ranking

=== Finals ===
Semifinals
(United States) Jarmere Jenkins | 6 | 6
4 | (Japan) Hiroki Moriya | 2 | 1
(Australia) John-Patrick Smith | 6 | 4 | 5
2 | (United States) Bradley Klahn | 2 | 6 | 7

Final
(United States) Jarmere Jenkins | 6^{5} | 1
2 | (United States) Bradley Klahn | 7^{7} | 6

=== Top half ===
First round
1 | (Japan) G Soeda | 6^{4} | 3
(United States) J Jenkins | 7 | 6
WC | (Australia) A Whittington | 1 | 2
(Australia) J Thompson | 6 | 6
Q | (Japan) Keita Koyama | 2 | 0
Q | (Australia) James Eames | 6 | 6
(Australia) M Banes | 2 | 2
5 | (Australia) T Kokkinakis | 6 | 6
4 | (Japan) H Moriya | 6 | 6
PR | (New Zealand) J Statham | 3 | 3
Q | (Australia) Darren Polkinghorne | 1 | 4
(China) D Wu | 6 | 6
WC | (Australia) J Millman | 6 | 6
(United Kingdom) B Klein | 1 | 4
(Australia) B Mitchell | 7^{7} | 7^{7}
8 | (Chinese Taipei) T Chen | 6^{1} | 6^{1}

Second round
(United States) J Jenkins | 6 | 6
(Australia) J Thompson | 4 | 4
Q | (Australia) J Eames | 1 | 1
5 | (Australia) T Kokkinakis | 6 | 6
4 | (Japan) H Moriya | 6 | 6
(China) D Wu | 3 | 1
WC | (Australia) J Millman | 2 | 6 | 6^{6}
(Australia) B Mitchell | 6 | 1 | 7^{8}

Quarterfinals
(United States) J Jenkins | 6^{3} | 6 | 7
5 | (Australia) T Kokkinakis | 7^{7} | 2 | 5
4 | (Japan) H Moriya | 6 | 4 | 7
(Australia) B Mitchell | 2 | 6 | 5

Semifinals
(United States) J Jenkins | 6 | 6
4 | (Japan) H Moriya | 2 | 1

=== Bottom half ===
First round
6 | (Australia) L Saville | 6 | 6
(United States) N Meister | 3 | 3
(Chinese Taipei) T-H Yang | 0 | 5
(Japan) T Niki | 6 | 7
Q | (Australia) G Jones | 4 | 6 | 6
(Australia) M Reid | 6 | 4 | 2
(Australia) J-P Smith | 6 | 6
3 | (Australia) M Ebden | 4 | 4
7 | (Australia) A Bolt | 4 | 6 | 6
(United States) M Krueger | 6 | 3 | 2
WC | (Australia) O Jasika | 6 | 3 | 6
(Chinese Taipei) L-C Huang | 1 | 6 | 3
(Australia) D Propoggia | 6 | 6
WC | (Australia) C O'Connell | 4 | 2
(United Kingdom) K Edmund | 6^{3} | 1
2 | (United States) B Klahn | 7^{7} | 6

Second round
6 | (Australia) L Saville | 6 | 6
(Japan) T Niki | 1 | 3
Q | (Australia) G Jones | 2 | 3
(Australia) J-P Smith | 6 | 6
7 | (Australia) A Bolt | 3 | 1
WC | (Australia) O Jasika | 6 | 6
(Australia) D Propoggia | 2 | 6 | 4
2 | (United States) B Klahn | 6 | 2 | 6

Quarterfinals
6 | (Australia) L Saville | 6 | 2 | 3
(Australia) J-P Smith | 4 | 6 | 6
WC | (Australia) O Jasika | 4 | 4
2 | (United States) B Klahn | 6 | 6

Semifinals
(Australia) J-P Smith | 6 | 4 | 5
2 | (United States) B Klahn | 2 | 6 | 7
