= 2019 Latrobe City Traralgon ATP Challenger – Singles =

Singles
- 2019 Latrobe City Traralgon ATP Challenger

Final
- Champion: (Australia) Marc Polmans
- Runner-up: (Australia) Andrew Harris
- Score: 7–5, 6–3

Events
Singles	Doubles
- Latrobe City Traralgon ATP Challenger

Jordan Thompson was the defending champion but chose not to defend his title.

Marc Polmans won the title after defeating Andrew Harris 7–5, 6–3 in the final.

== Seeds ==
All seeds receive a bye into the second round.

1. (Japan) Yasutaka Uchiyama (quarterfinals, retired)
2. (Japan) Tatsuma Ito (semifinals)
3. (Australia) James Duckworth (quarterfinals)
4. (Australia) Marc Polmans (champion)
5. (Australia) Alex Bolt (second round)
6. (Australia) Andrew Harris (final)
7. (United Kingdom) Jay Clarke (third round)
8. (Chile) Alejandro Tabilo (quarterfinals)
9. (Australia) Max Purcell (quarterfinals)
10. (India) Sasikumar Mukund (third round)
11. (Australia) Akira Santillan (third round)
12. (Japan) Hiroki Moriya (semifinals)
13. (Australia) Aleksandar Vukic (second round)
14. (Japan) Shuichi Sekiguchi (third round)
15. (Japan) Yosuke Watanuki (third round)
16. (Australia) Harry Bourchier (third round)

== Draw ==
Key

- Q = Qualifier
- WC = Wild card
- LL = Lucky loser
- Alt = Alternate
- ITF = ITF entry
- PR = Protected ranking
- SR = Special ranking
- SE = Special exempt
- JE = Junior exempt
- JR = Junior Accelerator Programme entrant
- CO = College Accelerator Programme entrant
- NG = Next Gen Accelerator Program entrant
- w/o = Walkover
- r = Retired
- d = Defaulted

=== Finals ===
Quarterfinals
1	(Japan) Yasutaka Uchiyama	3	0^{r}
12	(Japan) Hiroki Moriya	6	3
4	(Australia) Marc Polmans	6	7
8	(Chile) Alejandro Tabilo	1	5
6	(Australia) Andrew Harris	6	6
3	(Australia) James Duckworth	3	3
9	(Australia) Max Purcell	5	1
2	(Japan) Tatsuma Ito	7	6

Semifinals
12	(Japan) Hiroki Moriya	7	2	6^{4}
4	(Australia) Marc Polmans	5	6	7^{7}
6	(Australia) Andrew Harris	4	7^{7}	7^{9}
2	(Japan) Tatsuma Ito	6	6^{2}	6^{7}

Final
4	(Australia) Marc Polmans	7	6
6	(Australia) Andrew Harris	5	3

=== Top half ===
==== Section 1 ====
First round
(Thailand) W Trongcharoenchaikul	3	6^{5}
(Switzerland) L Castelnuovo	7	7^{7}
(Australia) D Kelly	6	5	7^{9}
(Australia) Jacob Grills	3	7	6^{7}
(Australia) M Banes	6	4	6
(France) A Musialek	3	6	2
WC	(Australia) Jai Corbett	5	6^{5}
WC	(Australia) Cameron Green	7	7^{7}

Second round
1	(Japan) Y Uchiyama	6	6
(Switzerland) L Castelnuovo	4	2
(Australia) D Kelly	4	6	6^{7}
14	(Japan) Shuichi Sekiguchi	6	2	7^{9}
12	(Japan) H Moriya	6	6
(Australia) M Banes	4	2
WC	(Australia) C Green	2	4
7	(United Kingdom) J Clarke	6	6

Third round
1	(Japan) Y Uchiyama	6	3	7
14	(Japan) S Sekiguchi	4	6	5
12	(Japan) H Moriya	6	6
7	(United Kingdom) J Clarke	4	4

Quarterfinals
1	(Japan) Y Uchiyama	3	0^{r}
12	(Japan) H Moriya	6	3

==== Section 2 ====
First round
Q	(Australia) James Ibrahim	4	2
(United States) E King	6	6
(Chile) MT Barrios Vera	6	6
(United States) Gage Brymer	3	3
(United Kingdom) B Klein	4	1
(Germany) S Fanselow	6	6
(Australia) Alexander Crnokrak	2	4
(Australia) L Saville	6	6

Second round
4	(Australia) M Polmans	6	7
(United States) E King	3	5
(Chile) MT Barrios Vera	6	3	6
13	(Australia) A Vukic	1	6	3
10	(India) S Mukund	7^{8}	6
(Germany) S Fanselow	6^{6}	3
(Australia) L Saville	5	7^{7}	5
8	(Chile) A Tabilo	7	6^{2}	7

Third round
4	(Australia) M Polmans	7^{7}	6
(Chile) MT Barrios Vera	6^{4}	2
10	(India) S Mukund	4	3
8	(Chile) A Tabilo	6	6

Quarterfinals
4	(Australia) M Polmans	6	7
8	(Chile) A Tabilo	1	5

=== Bottom half ===
==== Section 3 ====
First round
(Germany) Lucas Gerch	6	0
(Ukraine) V Orlov	2	0^{r}
(Dominican Republic) N Hardt	6	7
WC	(Australia) William Ma	4	5
(Finland) P Niklas-Salminen	6^{2}	7	6^{5}
WC	(Australia) T Schoolkate	7^{7}	5	7^{7}
Alt	(Australia) A Addison	3	0
(Finland) H Heliövaara	6	6

Second round
6	(Australia) A Harris	6	6
(Germany) L Gerch	2	3
(Dominican Republic) N Hardt	1	2
11	(Australia) A Santillan	6	6
15	(Japan) Yo Watanuki	6	6
WC	(Australia) T Schoolkate	4	2
(Finland) H Heliövaara	4	2
3	(Australia) J Duckworth	6	6

Third round
6	(Australia) A Harris	3	7	4
11	(Australia) A Santillan	6	5	1^{r}
15	(Japan) Yo Watanuki	3	3
3	(Australia) J Duckworth	6	6

Quarterfinals
6	(Australia) A Harris	6	6
3	(Australia) J Duckworth	3	3

==== Section 4 ====
First round
Q	(Australia) B Walkin	4	4
(Australia) B Mott	6	6
WC	(Australia) D Sweeny	6	6
(Russia) A Zakharov	3	3
(Germany) M Rosenkranz	5	4
(Australia) T Fancutt	7	6
(Australia) M Romios	2	6^{4}
PR	(Australia) B Mousley	6	7^{7}

Second round
5	(Australia) A Bolt	6^{5}	6^{4}
(Australia) B Mott	7^{7}	7^{7}
WC	(Australia) D Sweeny	5	2
9	(Australia) M Purcell	7	6
16	(Australia) H Bourchier	6	6
(Australia) T Fancutt	3	3
PR	(Australia) B Mousley	4	3
2	(Japan) T Ito	6	6

Third round
(Australia) B Mott	4	6	5
9	(Australia) M Purcell	6	3	7
16	(Australia) H Bourchier	4	6	3
2	(Japan) T Ito	6	4	6

Quarterfinals
9	(Australia) M Purcell	5	1
2	(Japan) T Ito	7	6
