= 2018 Latrobe City Traralgon ATP Challenger =

- Date: 22–28 October 2018
- Edition: 7th
- Surface: Hard
- Location: Traralgon, Australia

Champions

Singles
- (Australia) Jordan Thompson

Doubles
- (Australia) Jeremy Beale / (Australia) Marc Polmans
| ← 2017 · | Latrobe City Traralgon ATP Challenger | · 2019 → |

The 2018 Latrobe City Traralgon ATP Challenger was a professional tennis tournament played on outdoor hard court. It was the seventh edition of the tournament which was part of the 2018 ATP Challenger Tour. It took place in Traralgon, Australia, between 22 and 28 October 2018.

== Singles main draw entrants ==
=== Seeds ===
| Country | Player | Rank^{1} | Seed |
|---|---|---|---|
| AUS | Jason Kubler | 91 | 1 |
| JPN | Yoshihito Nishioka | 96 | 2 |
| AUS | Jordan Thompson | 108 | 3 |
| AUS | Alex Bolt | 139 | 4 |
| AUS | Marc Polmans | 148 | 5 |
| JPN | Hiroki Moriya | 187 | 6 |
| JPN | Yasutaka Uchiyama | 235 | 7 |
| FRA | Maxime Janvier | 244 | 8 |

- Rankings are as of 15 October 2018.

=== Other entrants ===
The following players received wildcards into the singles main draw:

- (Australia) Harry Bourchier
- (Australia) Thomas Fancutt
- (Australia) Jacob Grills
- (Australia) Aleksandar Vukic

The following players received entry from the qualifying draw:

- (United Kingdom) Brydan Klein
- (France) Fabien Reboul
- (Japan) Yosuke Watanuki
- (Chinese Taipei) Wu Tung-lin

The following player received entry as a lucky loser:

- (United Kingdom) Evan Hoyt

== Champions ==
=== Singles ===
- (Australia) Jordan Thompson def. (Japan) Yoshihito Nishioka 6–3, 6–4.

=== Doubles ===
- (Australia) Jeremy Beale / (Australia) Marc Polmans def. (Australia) Max Purcell / (Australia) Luke Saville, 6–2, 6–4.
