= 2019 Latrobe City Traralgon ATP Challenger =

- Date: 21–27 October 2019
- Edition: 8th
- Surface: Hard
- Location: Traralgon, Australia

Champions

Singles
- (Australia) Marc Polmans

Doubles
- (Australia) Max Purcell / (Australia) Luke Saville
← 2018 ·	Latrobe City Traralgon ATP Challenger	· 2022 →

The 2019 Latrobe City Traralgon ATP Challenger was a professional tennis tournament played on outdoor hard court. It was the eighth edition of the tournament which was part of the 2019 ATP Challenger Tour. It took place in Traralgon, Australia between 21–27 October 2019.

== Singles main draw entrants ==
=== Seeds ===
Country	Player	Rank^{1}	Seed
JPN	Yasutaka Uchiyama	108	1
JPN	Tatsuma Ito	137	2
AUS	James Duckworth	138	3
AUS	Marc Polmans	153	4
AUS	Alex Bolt	154	5
AUS	Andrew Harris	186	6
GBR	Jay Clarke	190	7
CHI	Alejandro Tabilo	212	8
AUS	Max Purcell	227	9
IND	Sasikumar Mukund	230	10
AUS	Akira Santillan	246	11
JPN	Hiroki Moriya	249	12
AUS	Aleksandar Vukic	253	13
JPN	Shuichi Sekiguchi	283	14
JPN	Yosuke Watanuki	289	15
AUS	Harry Bourchier	309	16

- Rankings are as of 14 October 2019.

=== Other entrants ===
The following players received wildcards into the singles main draw:

- (Australia) Jai Corbett
- (Australia) Cameron Green
- (Australia) William Ma
- (Australia) Tristan Schoolkate
- (Australia) Dane Sweeny

The following player received entry into the singles main draw using a protected ranking:

- (Australia) Bradley Mousley

The following player received entry into the singles main draw as an alternate:

- (Australia) Aaron Addison

The following players received entry from the qualifying draw:

- (Australia) James Ibrahim
- (Australia) Brandon Walkin

== Champions ==
=== Singles ===
- (Australia) Marc Polmans def. (Australia) Andrew Harris 7–5, 6–3.

=== Doubles ===
- (Australia) Max Purcell / (Australia) Luke Saville def. (United Kingdom) Brydan Klein / (Australia) Scott Puodziunas 6–7^{(2–7)}, 6–3, [10–4].
