= 2014 Latrobe City Traralgon ATP Challenger 1 =

- Date: 27 October - 2 November 2014
- Edition: 2nd (1st of 2014)
- Location: Traralgon, Australia

Champions

Singles
- (United States) Bradley Klahn

Doubles
- (United Kingdom) Brydan Klein / (Australia) Dane Propoggia
← 2013 ·	Latrobe City Traralgon ATP Challenger	· 2014 →

The 2014 Latrobe City Traralgon ATP Challenger 1 was a professional tennis tournament played on outdoor hard court. It was the second edition of the tournament which was part of the 2014 ATP Challenger Tour. It took place in Traralgon, Australia between 27 October – 2 November 2014. It was the first of two Traralgon Challengers in 2014.

== Singles main draw entrants ==
=== Seeds ===
Country	Player	Rank^{1}	Seed
JPN	Go Soeda	112	1
USA	Bradley Klahn	122	2
AUS	Matthew Ebden	123	3
JPN	Hiroki Moriya	154	4
AUS	Thanasi Kokkinakis	158	5
AUS	Luke Saville	173	6
AUS	Alex Bolt	212	7
TPE	Ti Chen	225	8

- Rankings are as of October 20, 2014.

=== Other entrants ===
The following players received wildcards into the singles main draw:

- (Australia) Omar Jasika
- (Australia) John Millman
- (Australia) Christopher O'Connell
- (Australia) Andrew Whittington

The following players received entry via protected ranking into the singles main draw:

- (New Zealand) Jose Statham

The following players received entry from the qualifying draw:

- (Australia) James Eames
- (Australia) Greg Jones
- (Japan) Keita Koyama
- (Australia) Darren Polkinghorne

== Champions ==
=== Singles ===
- (United States) Bradley Klahn def. (United States) Jarmere Jenkins, 7–5, 6–1

=== Doubles ===
- (United Kingdom) Brydan Klein / (Australia) Dane Propoggia def. (United States) Jarmere Jenkins / (United States) Mitchell Krueger, 6–1, 1–6, [10–3]
