= 2014 Latrobe City Traralgon ATP Challenger 2 =

- Date: 3–9 November 2014
- Edition: 3rd (2nd of 2014)
- Location: Traralgon, Australia

Champions

Singles
- (Australia) John Millman

Doubles
- (United Kingdom) Brydan Klein / (Australia) Dane Propoggia
← 2014 ·	Latrobe City Traralgon ATP Challenger	· 2015 →

The 2014 Latrobe City Traralgon ATP Challenger 2 was a professional tennis tournament played on outdoor hard court. It was the third edition of the tournament which was part of the 2014 ATP Challenger Tour. It took place in Traralgon, Australia between 3 – 9 November 2014. It was the second of two Traralgon Challengers in 2014.

== Singles main draw entrants ==
=== Seeds ===
Country	Player	Rank^{1}	Seed
JPN	Go Soeda	114	1
GBR	James Ward	119	2
USA	Bradley Klahn	124	3
JPN	Hiroki Moriya	153	4
AUS	Thanasi Kokkinakis	158	5
AUS	Luke Saville	174	6
AUS	Alex Bolt	211	7
TPE	Ti Chen	222	8

- Rankings are as of October 27, 2014.

=== Other entrants ===
The following players received wildcards into the singles main draw:

- (Australia) Jake Eames
- (Australia) Omar Jasika
- (Australia) Gavin van Peperzeel
- (Australia) Darren Polkinghorne

The following players received protected entry into the singles main draw:

- (Australia) Greg Jones
- (New Zealand) Jose Statham

The following players received entry from the qualifying draw:

- (New Zealand) Marcus Daniell
- (Australia) Christopher O'Connell
- (New Zealand) Artem Sitak
- (China) Bai Yan

== Champions ==
=== Singles ===
- (Australia) John Millman def. (United Kingdom) James Ward, 6–4, 6–1

=== Doubles ===
- (United Kingdom) Brydan Klein / (Australia) Dane Propoggia def. (New Zealand) Marcus Daniell / (New Zealand) Artem Sitak, 7–6^{(8–6)}, 3–6, [10–6]
