= 2013 Traralgon Challenger =

- Date: 28 October - 3 November
- Edition: 1st
- Location: Traralgon, Australia

Champions

Singles
- (India) Yuki Bhambri

Doubles
- (Australia) Ryan Agar / (Australia) Adam Feeney
Traralgon Challenger	· 2014 →

The 2013 Traralgon Challenger was a professional tennis tournament played on outdoor hard court. It was the first edition of the tournament which was part of the 2013 ATP Challenger Tour. It took place in Traralgon, Australia between 28 October - 3 November 2013.

== Singles main draw entrants ==
=== Seeds ===
Country	Player	Rank^{1}	Seed
USA	Bradley Klahn	128	1
AUS	James Duckworth	147	2
GBR	James Ward	180	3
JPN	Tatsuma Ito	191	4
~~AUS~~	~~Greg Jones~~	~~225~~	~~5~~
AUS	Matt Reid	232	6
AUS	Benjamin Mitchell	242	7
IND	Yuki Bhambri	287	8
NZL	Jose Statham	295	9

- Rankings are as of October 21, 2013.

=== Other entrants ===
The following players received wildcards into the singles main draw:

- (Australia) Maverick Banes
- (Australia) Blake Mott
- (Australia) Darren K. Polkinghorne
- (Australia) Gavin van Peperzeel

The following players received entry from the qualifying draw:

- (United States) Sean Berman
- (Australia) Brendon Moore
- (Japan) Bumpei Sato
- (Australia) Richard Yang

The following players received entry as a Lucky loser:

- (Australia) Chanchai Sookton-Eng

== Champions ==
=== Singles ===
- (India) Yuki Bhambri def. (United States) Bradley Klahn 6–7^{(13–15)}, 6–3, 6–4

=== Doubles ===
- (Australia) Ryan Agar / (Australia) Adam Feeney def. (Australia) Dane Propoggia / (New Zealand) Jose Statham 6–3, 6–4
