= 2014 Latrobe City Traralgon ATP Challenger 1 – Doubles =

Doubles
- 2014 Latrobe City Traralgon ATP Challenger 1

Final
- Champion: (United Kingdom) Brydan Klein (Australia) Dane Propoggia
- Runner-up: (United States) Jarmere Jenkins (United States) Mitchell Krueger
- Score: 6–1, 1–6, [10–3]

Events
Singles	Doubles
← 2013 ·	Latrobe City Traralgon ATP Challenger	· 2014 →

Ryan Agar and Adam Feeney were the defending champions, but did not compete this year.

Brydan Klein and Dane Propoggia won the title, defeating Jarmere Jenkins and Mitchell Krueger 6–1, 1–6, [10–3] in the final.

== Seeds ==
1. (New Zealand) Marcus Daniell / (New Zealand) Artem Sitak (first round)
2. (Australia) Alex Bolt / (Australia) Andrew Whittington (quarterfinals)
3. (China) Maoxin Gong / (Chinese Taipei) Hsien-yin Peng (first round)
4. (United States) Bradley Klahn / (Australia) Matt Reid (first round)

== Draw ==
=== Key ===
- Q = Qualifier
- WC = Wild card
- LL = Lucky loser
- Alt = Alternate
- SE = Special exempt
- PR = Protected ranking
- ITF = ITF entry
- JE = Junior exempt
- w/o = Walkover
- r = Retired
- d = Defaulted
- SR = Special ranking

=== Draw ===
First round
1	(New Zealand) M Daniell (New Zealand) A Sitak	3	7	[18]
(Chinese Taipei) C Ti (New Zealand) J Statham	6	5	[20]
(Chinese Taipei) L-C Huang (United States) N Meister	5	3
(Australia) Jake Eames (Australia) C O'Connell	7	6
4	(United States) B Klahn (Australia) M Reid	7^{7}	6^{6}	[8]
(United States) J Jenkins (United States) M Krueger	6^{5}	7^{8}	[10]
WC	(Australia) Mitchell Harper (Australia) C Puttergill	5	4
(Australia) Maverick Harper (Australia) Gavin van Peperzeel	7	6
(China) D Wu (Chinese Taipei) T-H Yang	3	2
(Australia) A Hubble (Australia) J-P Smith	6	6
(United Kingdom) B Klein (Australia) D Propoggia	6	7^{7}
3	(China) M Gong (Chinese Taipei) H-Y Peng	2	6^{5}
WC	(Australia) Daniel Hobart (Australia) T Kokkinakis	6	7^{7}
WC	(Australia) Jarryd Chaplin (Australia) J Thompson	2	6^{5}
(Japan) Bumpei Sato (Japan) G Soeda	6^{5}	5^{5}
2	(Australia) A Bolt (Australia) A Whittington	7^{7}	7^{7}

Quarterfinals
(Chinese Taipei) C Ti (New Zealand) J Statham	3	5
(Australia) Jake Eames (Australia) C O'Connell	6	7
(United States) J Jenkins (United States) M Krueger	6	6
(Australia) Maverick Harper (Australia) Gavin van Peperzeel	1	3
(Australia) A Hubble (Australia) J-P Smith	4	4
(United Kingdom) B Klein (Australia) D Propoggia	6	6
WC	(Australia) Daniel Hobart (Australia) T Kokkinakis	6	7
2	(Australia) A Bolt (Australia) A Whittington	3	5

Semifinals
(Australia) Jake Eames (Australia) C O'Connell	4	3
(United States) J Jenkins (United States) M Krueger	6	6
(United Kingdom) B Klein (Australia) D Propoggia	6	6
WC	(Australia) Daniel Hobart (Australia) T Kokkinakis	3	4

Final
(United States) J Jenkins (United States) M Krueger	1	6	[3]
(United Kingdom) B Klein (Australia) D Propoggia	6	1	[10]
