= 2017 Latrobe City Traralgon ATP Challenger =

- Date: 23–29 October 2017
- Edition: 6th
- Surface: Hard
- Location: Traralgon, Australia

Champions

Singles
- (Australia) Jason Kubler

Doubles
- (Australia) Alex Bolt / (Australia) Bradley Mousley
- Latrobe City Traralgon ATP Challenger

The 2017 Latrobe City Traralgon ATP Challenger was a professional tennis tournament played on outdoor hard court. It was the sixth edition of the tournament which was part of the 2017 ATP Challenger Tour. It took place in Traralgon, Australia between 23–29 October 2017.

== Singles main draw entrants ==
=== Seeds ===
Country	Player	Rank^{1}	Seed
AUS	Jordan Thompson	76	1
AUS	Matthew Ebden	118	2
JPN	Taro Daniel	119	3
USA	Mitchell Krueger	187	4
USA	Noah Rubin	216	5
USA	Evan King	231	6
AUS	Dayne Kelly	280	7
GBR	Brydan Klein	289	8

- Rankings are as of 16 October 2017.

=== Other entrants ===
The following players received wildcards into the singles main draw:

- (Australia) Matthew Dellavedova
- (Australia) Blake Ellis
- (Australia) Jacob Grills
- (Australia) Benjamin Mitchell

The following players received entry into the singles main using with a protected ranking:

- (Australia) Andrew Harris
- (Australia) Dane Propoggia

The following player received entry into the singles main draw as an alternate:

- (Australia) Christopher O'Connell

The following players received entry from the qualifying draw:

- (Australia) Jason Kubler
- (Austria) Lucas Miedler
- (Australia) Gavin van Peperzeel
- (Netherlands) Sem Verbeek

== Champions ==
=== Singles ===
- (Australia) Jason Kubler def. (Australia) Alex Bolt 2–6, 7–6^{(8–6)}, 7–6^{(7–3)}.

=== Doubles ===
- (Australia) Alex Bolt / (Australia) Bradley Mousley def. (United States) Evan King / (United States) Nathan Pasha 6–4, 6–2.
