= 2015 Latrobe City Traralgon ATP Challenger =

- Date: 26 October – 1 November
- Edition: 4th
- Prize money: $50,000
- Surface: Hard
- Location: Traralgon, Australia

Champions

Singles
- (Australia) Matthew Ebden

Doubles
- (Australia) Dayne Kelly / (Australia) Marinko Matosevic
- Latrobe City Traralgon ATP Challenger

The 2015 Latrobe City Traralgon ATP Challenger was a professional tennis tournament played on outdoor hard court. It was the fourth edition of the tournament which was part of the 2015 ATP Challenger Tour. It took place in Traralgon, Australia between 26 October – 1 November 2015.

== Singles main draw entrants ==
=== Seeds ===
| Country | Player | Rank^{1} | Seed |
|---|---|---|---|
| AUS | Matthew Ebden | 128 | 1 |
| AUS | Jordan Thompson | 167 | 2 |
| GBR | Brydan Klein | 187 | 3 |
| AUS | Luke Saville | 192 | 4 |
| USA | Connor Smith | 244 | 5 |
| CHN | Zhe Li | 263 | 6 |
| AUS | Alex Bolt | 275 | 7 |
| AUS | Marinko Matosevic | 284 | 8 |

- Rankings are as of 19 October 2015.

=== Other entrants ===
The following players received wildcards into the singles main draw:

- (Australia) Jacob Grills
- (Australia) Blake Mott
- (Australia) Bradley Mousley
- (Australia) Thomas Fancutt

The following players received entry into the singles main draw with a protected ranking:

- (Australia) Greg Jones

The following players received entry from the qualifying draw:

- (Australia) Marinko Matosevic
- (Germany) Sebastian Fanselow
- (Australia) Dayne Kelly
- (Czech Republic) Robin Stanek

The following players received entry as a lucky loser:

- (Australia) Oliver Anderson

== Champions ==
=== Singles ===
- (Australia) Matthew Ebden def. (Australia) Jordan Thompson 7–5, 6–3

=== Doubles ===
- (Australia) Dayne Kelly / (Australia) Marinko Matosevic def. (Australia) Omar Jasika / (Australia) Bradley Mousley 7–5, 6–2
