= Scott Puodziunas =

Australian tennis player

- Country (sports): Australia
- Born: 9 November 1989 (age 36) Brisbane, Australia
- Height: 1.98 m (6 ft 6 in)
- Plays: Right-handed (two-handed backhand)
- Prize money: $60,425

Singles
- Career record: 0–0 (at ATP Tour level, Grand Slam level, and in Davis Cup)
- Career titles: 0
- Highest ranking: No. 891 (23 October 2017)

Doubles
- Career record: 0–0 (at ATP Tour level, Grand Slam level, and in Davis Cup)
- Career titles: 14 ITF
- Highest ranking: No. 171 (13 January 2020)

Scott Puodziunas (born 9 November 1989) is an Australian tennis player.

Puodziunas has a career high ATP singles ranking of No. 891 achieved on 23 October 2017 and a career high ATP doubles ranking of No. 171 achieved on 13 January 2020.

Puodziunas made his ATP main draw debut at the 2021 Great Ocean Road Open in the doubles draw partnering Calum Puttergill.

== Challenger and Futures Finals ==
=== Doubles 28 (14–14) ===
Legend (singles) ATP Challenger Tour (0–2) ITF Futures Tour/World Tennis Tour (14–12)	Titles by surface Hard (3–7) Clay (10–5) Grass (1–2) Carpet (0–0)

Outcome	W‑L	Date	Tournament	Surface	Partner	Opponents	Score
Loss	0–1	May 2012	Thailand F1, Bangkok	Hard	(Australia) Gavin Van Peperzeel	(Thailand) Weerapat Doakmaiklee (Japan) Hiroki Kondo	0–6, 4–6
Win	1–1	Jul 2014	Turkey F24, Istanbul	Hard	(Australia) Darren Polkinghorne	(South Africa) Nicolaas Scholtz (South Africa) Tucker Vorster	7–6^{(9–7)}, 7–6^{(7–5)}
Win	2–1	May 2016	Bosnia & Herzegovina F3, Kiseljak	Clay	(Australia) Steven de Waard	(Brazil) Wilson Leite (Sweden) Christian Lindell	6–3, 7–5
Win	3–1	Jun 2016	Bulgaria F4, Plovdiv	Clay	(Australia) Steven de Waard	(Slovakia) Martin Beran (Spain) Diego-Jose Manrique-Velazquez	4–6, 7–5, [10–7]
Loss	3–2	Jun 2016	Germany F5, Kamen	Clay	(Australia) Bradley Mousley	(Germany) Johannes Härteis (Germany) Hannes Wagner	6–7^{(6–8)}, 6–2, [6–10]
Loss	3–3	Aug 2016	Slovak Republic F2, Piešťany	Clay	(Slovakia) Martin Beran	(Ukraine) Danylo Kalenichenko (Austria) David Pichler	2–6, 0–6
Loss	3–4	Mar 2017	Australia F3, Canberra	Clay	(Australia) Steven de Waard	(Australia) Bradley Mousley (Australia) Marc Polmans	4–6, 6–7^{(4–7)}
Win	4–4	Jun 2017	Hungary F4, Gyula	Clay	(Serbia) Nikola Ćaćić	(Hungary) Levente Gödry (Hungary) Péter Nagy	7–6^{(7–2)}, 6–2
Loss	4–5	Jul 2017	Germany F7, Trier	Clay	(United States) Hunter Reese	(Romania) Vasile Antonescu (Romania) Patrick Grigoriu	7–5, 4–6, [1–10]
Loss	4–6	Aug 2017	Romania F8, Pitești	Clay	(United States) Hunter Reese	(Romania) Bogdan Ionut Apostol (Sweden) Dragoș Nicolae Mădăraș	6–1, 3–6, [9–11]
Win	5–6	Aug 2017	Serbia F1, Novi Sad	Clay	(Australia) Dane Propoggia	(Hungary) Gábor Borsos (Croatia) Nino Serdarušić	6–3, 7–5
Win	6–6	Aug 2017	Serbia F2, Novi Sad	Clay	(Australia) Dane Propoggia	(Croatia) Ivan Sabanov (Croatia) Matej Sabanov	7–6^{(8–6)}, 5–7, [11–9]
Win	7–6	Sep 2017	Australia F4, Alice Springs	Hard	(Australia) Dane Propoggia	(Australia) Bradley Mousley (Australia) Darren Polkinghorne	6–4, 6–4
Loss	7–7	Dec 2017	Indonesia F8, Jakarta	Hard	(Japan) Sora Fukuda	(Indonesia) Justin Barki (India) Vijay Sundar Prashanth	6–4, 6–7^{(5–7)}, [4–10]
Win	8–7	Jun 2018	Bosnia & Herzegovina F3, Kiseljak	Clay	(Australia) Dane Propoggia	(Slovenia) Tom Kočevar-Dešman (Slovenia) Nik Razboršek	2–6, 7–6^{(7–5)}, [10–4]
Win	9–7	Jun 2018	Hungary F4, Gyula	Clay	(Australia) Dane Propoggia	(Sweden) André Göransson (Sweden) Fred Simonsson	6–4, 6–1
Win	10–7	Jul 2018	Belgium F2, Arlon	Clay	(Australia) Dane Propoggia	(Belgium) Jonas Merckx (Belgium) Jeroen Vanneste	6–1, 6–0
Loss	10–8	Sep 2018	Australia F6, Darwin	Hard	(United Kingdom) Brydan Klein	(Australia) Jeremy Beale (Australia) Thomas Fancutt	6–7^{(4–7)}, 3–6
Loss	10–9	Oct 2018	Australia F7, Brisbane	Hard	(United Kingdom) Brydan Klein	(Australia) Jeremy Beale (Australia) Thomas Fancutt	6–2, 4–6, [6–10]
Loss	10–10	Oct 2018	Australia F8, Toowoomba	Hard	(United Kingdom) Brydan Klein	(Australia) Blake Ellis (Australia) Luke Saville	4–6, 7–6^{(7–2)}, [2–10]
Win	11–10	Mar 2019	M25 Albury, Australia	Grass	(United Kingdom) Brydan Klein	(India) Arjun Kadhe (Australia) Jason Taylor	4–6, 7–5, [11–9]
Loss	11–11	Mar 2019	M25 Mildura, Australia	Grass	(United Kingdom) Brydan Klein	(Australia) Calum Puttergill (Australia) Brandon Walkin	6–7^{(4–7)}, 7–6^{(7–3)}, [16–18]
Win	12–11	Apr 2019	M25 Santa Margherita Di Pula, Italy	Clay	(Italy) Marco Bortolotti	(Croatia) Ivan Sabanov (Croatia) Matej Sabanov	6–2, 6–4
Win	13–11	May 2019	M25 Vercelli, Italy	Clay	(Italy) Marco Bortolotti	(United Kingdom) Toby Martin (Germany) Jakob Sude	6–2, 6–2
Loss	13–12	Sep 2019	Shanghai, China	Hard	(Australia) Marc Polmans	(China) Gao Xin (China) Sun Fajing	6–2, 4–6, [7–10]
Win	14–12	Oct 2019	M25 Toowoomba, Australia	Hard	(United Kingdom) Brydan Klein	(Chinese Taipei) Hsu Yu-hsiou (Ukraine) Vladyslav Orlov	6–3, 6–4
Loss	14–13	Oct 2019	Traralgon, Australia	Hard	(United Kingdom) Brydan Klein	(Australia) Max Purcell (Australia) Luke Saville	7–6^{(7–2)}, 3–6, [4–10]
Loss	14–14	Mar 2020	M25 Mildura, Australia	Grass	(United Kingdom) Brydan Klein	(Australia) Jeremy Beale (Australia) Thomas Fancutt	6–4, 6–7^{(6–8)}, [3–10]
