= Jeremy Beale =

Australian tennis player (born 1994)

- Country (sports): Australia
- Residence: Melbourne, Australia
- Born: 4 October 1994 (age 32) Preston, Melbourne, Australia
- Height: 1.93 m (6 ft 4 in)
- Plays: Left-handed (two-handed backhand)
- Prize money: US $78,298

Singles
- Career record: 0–0
- Career titles: 0 Challenger, 2 Futures
- Highest ranking: No. 459 (8 October 2018)
- Current ranking: No. 1,429 (19 October 2026)

Doubles
- Career record: 0–0
- Career titles: 1 Challenger, 13 Futures
- Highest ranking: No. 224 (22 December 2018)
- Current ranking: No. 1,556 (19 October 2026)
- Last updated on: 19 October 2026.

Jeremy Beale (born 4 October 1994) is an Australian tennis player. Beale has a career high ATP singles ranking of No. 459 achieved on 8 October 2018 and a career high doubles ranking of No. 224 achieved on 22 December 2018.

Beale has won 1 ATP Challenger doubles title in 2018.

On 20 September 2021, Beale improved 100 places to number 684 after claiming his first ITF Futures singles title since 2018.

== ATP Challengers and ITF Futures finals ==
=== Singles: 8 (2–6) ===
Legend
ATP Challengers (0–0)
ITF Futures (2–6)

Result	W–L	Date	Tournament	Tier	Surface	Opponent	Score
Loss	0–1	Jun 2015	Maputo, Mozambique	Futures	Hard	(South Africa) Lloyd Harris	2–6, 1–6
Loss	0–2	Jun 2016	Maputo, Mozambique	Futures	Hard	(Australia) Marc Polmans	1–6, 1–6
Win	1–2	Aug 2018	Jakarta, Indonesia	Futures	Hard	(Japan) Kaito Uesugi	6–2, 6–2
Loss	1–3	Jun 2016	Anning, China	Futures	Clay	(Switzerland) Luca Castelnuovo	1–6, 6–7
Loss	1–4	May 2021	Monastir, Tunisia	Futures	Hard	(South Korea) Yunseong Chung	4–6, 2–6
Win	2–4	Sep 2021	Monastir, Tunisia	Futures	Hard	(United States) Gage Brymer	6–4, 6–4
Loss	2–5	Sep 2021	Johannesburg, South Africa	Futures	Hard	(United Kingdom) Alastair Gray	6–7, 4–6
Loss	2–6	Oct 2023	Cairns, Australia	Futures	Hard	(New Zealand) Ajeet Rai	2–3, ret.

=== Doubles: (17–6) ===
Legend
ATP Challengers (2–1)
ITF Futures (15–5)

Result	W–L	Date	Tournament	Surface	Partner	Opponent	Score
Loss	0–1	Aug 2016	Novi Sad, Serbia	Clay	(Australia) Nicholas Horton	(Croatia) Domagoj Biljesko (Serbia) Dejan Katic	6–2, 3–6, [6–10]
Loss	0–2	Jun 2017	Hua Hin, Thailand	Hard	(Australia) Thomas Fancutt	(France) Yannick Jankovits (France) Clement Larriere	3–6, 6–3, [9–11]
Loss	0–3	Sep 2017	Zlatibor, Serbia	Clay	(Australia) Alexander Babanine	(Croatia) Darko Jandric (Serbia) Ivan Sabanov	4–6, 2–6
Winner	1–3	Mar 2018	Renmark, Australia	Grass	(Australia) Thomas Fancutt	(Australia) Dayne Kelly (Australia) Gavin Van Peperzeel	6–3, 6–7, [10–7]
Winner	2–3	Mar 2018	Mildura, Australia	Grass	(Australia) Thomas Fancutt	(Australia) Edward Bourchier (Australia) Harry Bourchier	6–4, 6–4
Winner	3–3	Jun 2018	Singapore, Singapore	Hard	(Australia) James Frawley	(Chinese Taipei) Hsu Yu-hsiou (Japan) Yuta Shimizu	6–2, 6–3
Loss	3–4	Aug 2018	Anning, China	Clay	(New Zealand) Rhett Purcell	(China) Wang Aoran (China) Hao Wu	6–7, 6–3, [10–12]
Winner	4–4	Aug 2018	Anning, China	Clay	(Switzerland) Luca Castelnuovo	(India) Anirudh Chandrasekar (India) Vignesh Peranamallur	6–3, 3–6, [10–3]
Winner	5–4	Oct 2018	Darwin, Australia	Hard	(Australia) Thomas Fancutt	(United Kingdom) Brydan Klein (Australia) Scott Puodziunas	7–3, 6–3
Winner	6–4	Oct 2018	Brisbane, Australia	Hard	(Australia) Thomas Fancutt	(United Kingdom) Brydan Klein (Australia) Scott Puodziunas	2–6, 6–4, [10–6]
Winner	7–4	Oct 2018	Traralgon, Australia	Hard	(Australia) Marc Polmans	(Australia) Max Purcell (Australia) Luke Saville	6–2, 6–4
Loss	7–5	Nov 2018	Canberra, Australia	Hard	(Australia) Thomas Fancutt	(United Kingdom) Evan Hoyt (Chinese Taipei) Wu Tung-lin	6–7 7–5 8–10
Winner	8–5	Mar 2020	Mildura, Australia	Grass	(Australia) Thomas Fancutt	(United Kingdom) Brydan Klein (Australia) Scott Puodziunas	4–6, 7–6, [10–3]
Winner	9–5	May 2021	Monastir, Monastir	Hard	(Australia) Thomas Fancutt	(Tunisia) Aziz Dougaz (Burundi) Guy Orly Iradukunda	6–4, 3–6, [10–6]
Winner	10–5	May 2021	Monastir, Monastir	Hard	(Australia) Thomas Fancutt	(Argentina) Tomás Farjat (Argentina) Santiago Rodríguez Taverna	6–3, 3–4
Winner	11–5	May 2021	Monastir, Monastir	Hard	(Australia) Thomas Fancutt	(India) Siddhant Banthia (New Zealand) Ajeet Rai	6–4, 6–4
Loss	11–6	Jul 2021	Monastir, Tunisia	Hard	(New Zealand) Ajeet Rai	(France) Arthur Bouquier (Argentina) Santiago Rodríguez Taverna	7–5, 4–6, [7–10]
Winner	12–6	Aug 2021	Monastir, Tunisia	Hard	(Australia) Thomas Fancutt	(Argentina) Mateo Nicolás Martínez (Argentina) Santiago Rodríguez Taverna	3–6, 7–6, [13–11]
Winner	13–6	Aug 2021	Monastir, Tunisia	Hard	(Australia) Thomas Fancutt	(Lebanon) Hady Habib (Argentina) Mateo Nicolás Martínez	6–4, 7–6
Winner	14–6	Aug 2021	Monastir, Tunisia	Hard	(Australia) Li Tu	(Denmark) August Holmgren (Denmark) Johannes Ingildsen	6–4, 6–2
Winner	15–6	Oct 2022	Playford, Australia	Hard	(Australia) Calum Puttergill	(Japan) Rio Noguchi (Japan) Yusuke Takahashi	7–6^{(7–2)}, 6–4
Winner	16–6	Nov 2022	Traralgon, Australia	Hard	(Australia) James Frawley	(Australia) Adam Taylor (United Kingdom) Mark Whitehouse	6–3, 6–4
Winner	17–6	Nov 2022	Traralgon, Australia	Hard	(Australia) James Frawley	(Australia) Matthew Romios (Australia) Calum Puttergill	6–3, 6–2
