= Harry Bourchier =

Australian tennis player

- Country (sports): Australia
- Residence: Melbourne, Australia
- Born: 24 January 1996 (age 30) Hobart, Australia
- Height: 1.85 m (6 ft 1 in)
- Plays: Right-handed (two-handed backhand)
- Coach: Simon Youl
- Prize money: US $161,302

Singles
- Career record: 1–1 (at ATP Tour level, Grand Slam level, and in Davis Cup)
- Career titles: 0
- Highest ranking: No. 279 (13 January 2020)

Grand Slam singles results
- Australian Open: Q1 (2015, 2016, 2017, 2020, 2021)

Doubles
- Career record: 0–2 (at ATP Tour level, Grand Slam level, and in Davis Cup)
- Career titles: 0
- Highest ranking: No. 275 (2 March 2020)

Harry Bourchier (born 24 January 1996) is an Australian tennis player. He has a career high ATP singles ranking of No. 279 achieved on 13 January 2020 and a career high ATP doubles ranking of No. 275 achieved on 2 March 2020.

Bourchier made his ATP main draw debut at the 2021 Murray River Open, where he was a late alternate into the singles main draw. He beat compatriot Marc Polmans in the first round but lost to 13th seed Nick Kyrgios in the second round.

== Personal life ==
Bourchier started playing tennis at the age of six.

== Career ==
=== 2012–2020: Career beginnings ===
Bourchier made his debut on the ITF circuit at the Australia F5 in August 2012.

Bourchier won his first ATP Challenger Tour match at the 2014 West Lakes Challenger in February 2014. In March 2015, Bourchier reached his first ITF final in Mildura.

In February 2015, Bourchier reacher the quarter-final of the Launceston Tennis International. In March 2015, Bourchier reached his first ITF final in Mildura.

In 2019, Bourchier won four ITF singles titles.

=== 2021: ATP debut ===
In January 2021, Bourchier lost in the first round of the 2021 Australian Open – Men's singles qualifying.

In February 2021, Bourchier made his ATP tour main draw debut at the Murray River Open in 2021. He won his first match against Marc Polmans in straight sets before succumbing to 13th seed Nick Kyrgios 2-6, 6-7(7).

== ATP Challengers and ITF Futures finals ==
=== Singles: (4–2) ===
Legend
ATP Challengers (0–0)
ITF Futures (4–2)

| Result | W–L | Date | Tournament | Tier | Surface | Opponent | Score |
|---|---|---|---|---|---|---|---|
| Loss | 0–1 | Mar 2015 | Mildura, Australia | Futures | Grass | (Australia) Matthew Barton | 4–6, 2–6 |
| Loss | 0–2 | Sep 2017 | Alice Springs, Australia | Futures | Hard | (Australia) Maverick Banes | 5–7, 6–7 |
| Win | 1–2 | Mar 2019 | Mornington, Australia | Futures | Clay | (Australia) Christopher O'Connell | 6–4, 6–4 |
| Win | 2–2 | Mar 2019 | Mornington, Australia | Futures | Clay | (Australia) Christopher O'Connell | 6–4, 3–6, 6–3 |
| Win | 3–2 | Mar 2019 | Singapore, Singapore | Futures | Hard | (United States) Maksim Tikhomirov | 6–2, 6–3 |
| Win | 4–2 | June 2019 | Hengyang, China | Futures | Hard | (China) Sun Fajing | 7–6, 6–1 |

=== Doubles: 12 (5–7) ===
Legend
ATP Challengers (0–1)
ITF Futures (5–6)

| Result | W–L | Date | Tournament | Tier | Surface | Partner | Opponents | Score |
|---|---|---|---|---|---|---|---|---|
| Win | 1–0 | Oct 2015 | Manila, Philippines | Futures | Clay | (Spain) Enrique López Pérez | (Japan) Issei Okamura (Japan) Kento Takeuchi | 6–4, 6–3 |
| Win | 2–0 | May 2016 | Wuhan, China | Futures | Hard | (Japan) Akira Santillan | (China) He Yecong (China) Wang Aoxiong | 4–6, 6–2, [10–7] |
| Loss | 2–1 | Oct 2016 | Brisbane, Australia | Futures | Hard | (Australia) James Frawley | (Australia) Dayne Kelly (Australia) Bradley Mousley | 2–6, 3–6 |
| Win | 3–1 | Mar 2017 | Mildura, Australia | Futures | Hard | (Australia) Gavin van Peperzeel | (Australia) Alex Bolt (Australia) Dane Propoggia | 3–6, 7–6, [9–11] |
| Loss | 3–2 | May 2017 | Wuhan, China | Futures | Hard | (Australia) Dayne Kelly | (Japan) Soichiro Moritani (Japan) Masato Shiga | 6–7, 4–6 |
| Win | 4–2 | May 2017 | Luan, China | Futures | Hard | (Japan) Kaichi Uchida | (Chinese Taipei) Lo Chien-hsun (China) Zhou Shenghao | 6–3, 7–5 |
| Loss | 4–3 | Jul 2017 | Setubal, Portugal | Futures | Hard | (Australia) Daniel Nolan | (Portugal) Nuno Borges (Portugal) Francisco Cabral | 6–7, 4–6 |
| Win | 5–3 | Jul 2017 | Dublin, Ireland | Futures | Hard | (Australia) Daniel Nolan | (Australia) Edward Bourchier (Republic of Ireland) Samuel Bothwell | 6–2, 2–6, [10–3] |
| Loss | 5–4 | Aug 2017 | Decatur, U.S.A. | Futures | Hard | (Australia) Edward Bourchier | (Moldova) Alexandru Gozun (United States) Nathaniel Lammons | 2–6, 6–7 |
| Loss | 5–5 | Mar 2018 | Mildura, Australia | Futures | Grass | (Australia) Edward Bourchier | (Australia) Jeremy Beale (Australia) Thomas Fancutt | 4–6, 4–6 |
| Loss | 5–6 | Sep 2019 | Brisbane, Australia | Futures | Hard | (Philippines) Francis Alcantara | (Australia) Jake Delaney (Australia) Luke Saville | 1–6, 6–3, [6–10] |
| Loss | 5–7 | Feb 2020 | Calgary, Canada | Challenger | Hard | (Canada) Filip Peliwo | (United States) Nathan Pasha (United States) Max Schnur | 6–7, 3–6 |
