= Traralgon International =

Defunct tennis tournament
- Event name: Traralgon International
- Location: Traralgon, Australia
- Venue: Traralgon Tennis Centre
- Surface: Hard
- Website: traralgontennis.com.au

Current champions (2022)
- Men's singles: (Czech Republic) Tomáš Macháč
- Women's singles: (China) Yuan Yue
- Men's doubles: (France) Manuel Guinard / (Czech Republic) Zdeněk Kolář
- Women's doubles: (United States) Emina Bektas / (United Kingdom) Tara Moore
ATP Tour
- Category: Challenger 80 (2013-2022), ITF (2024)
- Draw: 32S / 32Q / 16D
- Prize money: $58,320
WTA Tour
- Category: ITF Women's W60 (2022)
- Draw: 32S / 32Q / 16D
- Prize money: $60,000+H

The Traralgon International (formerly Traralgon Challenger) was a professional tennis tournament played on outdoor hardcourts. It was part of the ITF Women's World Tennis Tour until 2024, and part of the ATP Challenger Tour until 2022. It was held annually in Traralgon, Victoria in Australia since 2006.

From 2006 to 2012, the tournament was held as an ITF women's event. From 2013 to 2019 the tournament was held as an ATP Challenger event. The 2014 Traralgon hosted two Challenger events, back to back from October 27 to November 9.

In 2022, the tournament held both women's and men's events. In 2024 W35/M25 ITF events both for women's and for men's were held (in two editions).

== Past finals ==
=== Men's singles ===
Year	Champion	Runner-up	Score
2022	(Czech Republic) Tomáš Macháč	(United States) Bjorn Fratangelo	7–6^{(7–2)}, 6–3
2020–21	Tournament cancelled due to the COVID-19 pandemic		
2019	(Australia) Marc Polmans	(Australia) Andrew Harris	7–5, 6–3
2018	(Australia) Jordan Thompson (2)	(Japan) Yoshihito Nishioka	6–3, 6–4
2017	(Australia) Jason Kubler	(Australia) Alex Bolt	2–6, 7–6^{(8–6)}, 7–6^{(7–3)}
2016	(Australia) Jordan Thompson	(Slovakia) Grega Žemlja	6–1, 6–2
2015	(Australia) Matthew Ebden	(Australia) Jordan Thompson	7–5, 6–3
2014 (2)	(Australia) John Millman	(United Kingdom) James Ward	6–4, 6–1
2014 (1)	(United States) Bradley Klahn	(United States) Jarmere Jenkins	7–5, 6–1
2013	(India) Yuki Bhambri	(United States) Bradley Klahn	6–7^{(13–15)}, 6–3, 6–4

=== Women's singles ===
Year	Champion	Runner-up	Score
2024 (2)	(Thailand) Lanlana Tararudee	(China) Ma Yexin	6–4, 7–5
2024 (1)	(United Kingdom) Amarni Banks	(Japan) Naho Sato	6–3, 6–3
2023	not held		
2022 (3)	(Australia) Destanee Aiava	(Australia) Lizette Cabrera	6–3, 6–7^{(4–7)}, 6–4
2022 (2)	(Indonesia) Priska Madelyn Nugroho	(United Kingdom) Naiktha Bains	6–4, 6–4
2022 (1)	(China) Yuan Yue	(Argentina) Paula Ormaechea	6–3, 6–2
2013–21	not held		
2012	(Australia) Ashleigh Barty	(Russia) Arina Rodionova	6–2, 6–3
2011	(Australia) Casey Dellacqua	(New Zealand) Sacha Jones	7–5, 7–6^{(8–6)}
2010	(Israel) Julia Glushko	(New Zealand) Sacha Jones	2–6, 7–5, 7–6^{(7–4)}
2009	not held		
2008	(Slovakia) Jarmila Gajdošová	(United Kingdom) Melanie South	6–3, 3–6, 6–1
2007	(Australia) Jessica Moore	(Indonesia) Sandy Gumulya	6–4, 6–4
2006	(United States) Raquel Kops-Jones	(Australia) Casey Dellacqua	6–4, 6–2

=== Men's doubles ===
Year	Champions	Runners-up	Score
2022	(France) Manuel Guinard (Czech Republic) Zdeněk Kolář	(Switzerland) Marc-Andrea Hüsler (Switzerland) Dominic Stricker	6–3, 6–4
2020–21	Tournament cancelled due to the COVID-19 pandemic		
2019	(Australia) Max Purcell (Australia) Luke Saville	(United Kingdom) Brydan Klein (Australia) Scott Puodziunas	6–7^{(2–7)}, 6–3, [10–4]
2018	(Australia) Jeremy Beale (Australia) Marc Polmans	(Australia) Max Purcell (Australia) Luke Saville	6–2, 6–4
2017	(Australia) Alex Bolt (Australia) Bradley Mousley	(United States) Evan King (United States) Nathan Pasha	6–4, 6–2
2016	(Australia) Matt Reid (Australia) John-Patrick Smith	(Australia) Matthew Barton (Australia) Matthew Ebden	6–4, 6–4
2015	(Australia) Marinko Matosevic (Australia) Dayne Kelly	(Australia) Omar Jasika (Australia) Bradley Mousley	7–5, 6–2
2014 (2)	(United Kingdom) Brydan Klein (2) (Australia) Dane Propoggia (2)	(New Zealand) Marcus Daniell (New Zealand) Artem Sitak	7–6^{(8–6)}, 3–6, [10–6]
2014 (1)	(United Kingdom) Brydan Klein (Australia) Dane Propoggia	(United States) Jarmere Jenkins (United States) Mitchell Krueger	6–1, 1–6, [10–3]
2013	(Australia) Adam Feeney (Australia) Ryan Agar	(Australia) Dane Propoggia (New Zealand) Jose Statham	6–3, 6–4

=== Women's doubles ===
Year	Champions	Runners-up	Score
2024 (2)	(Japan) Yuki Naito (Japan) Naho Sato	(Australia) Destanee Aiava (Australia) Tenika McGiffin	6–1, 6–3
2024 (1)	(Japan) Mana Kawamura (China) Liu Fangzhou	(Japan) Sayaka Ishii (Thailand) Lanlana Tararudee	6–7^{(4–7)}, 6–3, [13–11]
2023	not held		
2022 (3)	(Australia) Destanee Aiava (New Zealand) Katherine Westbury	(Indonesia) Priska Madelyn Nugroho (India) Ankita Raina	6–1, 4–6, [10–5]
2022 (2)	(United Kingdom) Naiktha Bains (Australia) Alana Parnaby	(Japan) Haruna Arakawa (Japan) Natsuho Arakawa	7–6^{(7–4)}, 6–2
2022 (1)	(United States) Emina Bektas (United Kingdom) Tara Moore	(United States) Catherine Harrison (Indonesia) Aldila Sutjiadi	0–6, 7–6^{(7–1)}, [10–8]
2013–21	not held		
2012	(Zimbabwe) Cara Black (Russia) Arina Rodionova	(Australia) Ashleigh Barty (Australia) Sally Peers	2–6, 7–6^{(7–4)}, [10–8]
2011	(Australia) Stephanie Bengson (Australia) Tyra Calderwood	(Australia) Monique Adamczak (Australia) Bojana Bobusic	6–7^{(2–7)}, 6–1, [10–8]
2010	(Hungary) Tímea Babos (United Kingdom) Melanie South	(Australia) Jarmila Groth (Australia) Jade Hopper	6–3, 6–2
2009	not held		
2008	(South Africa) Natalie Grandin (United States) Robin Stephenson	(Slovakia) Jarmila Gajdošová (Australia) Jessica Moore	6–4, 6–2
2007	(Japan) Erika Sema (Japan) Yurika Sema	(United States) Courtney Nagle (United States) Robin Stephenson	6–2, 6–2
2006	(Australia) Christina Horiatopoulos (United States) Raquel Kops-Jones	(Australia) Casey Dellacqua (United States) Sunitha Rao	6–2, 7–6^{(7–5)}
