= Maverick Banes =

Australian tennis player

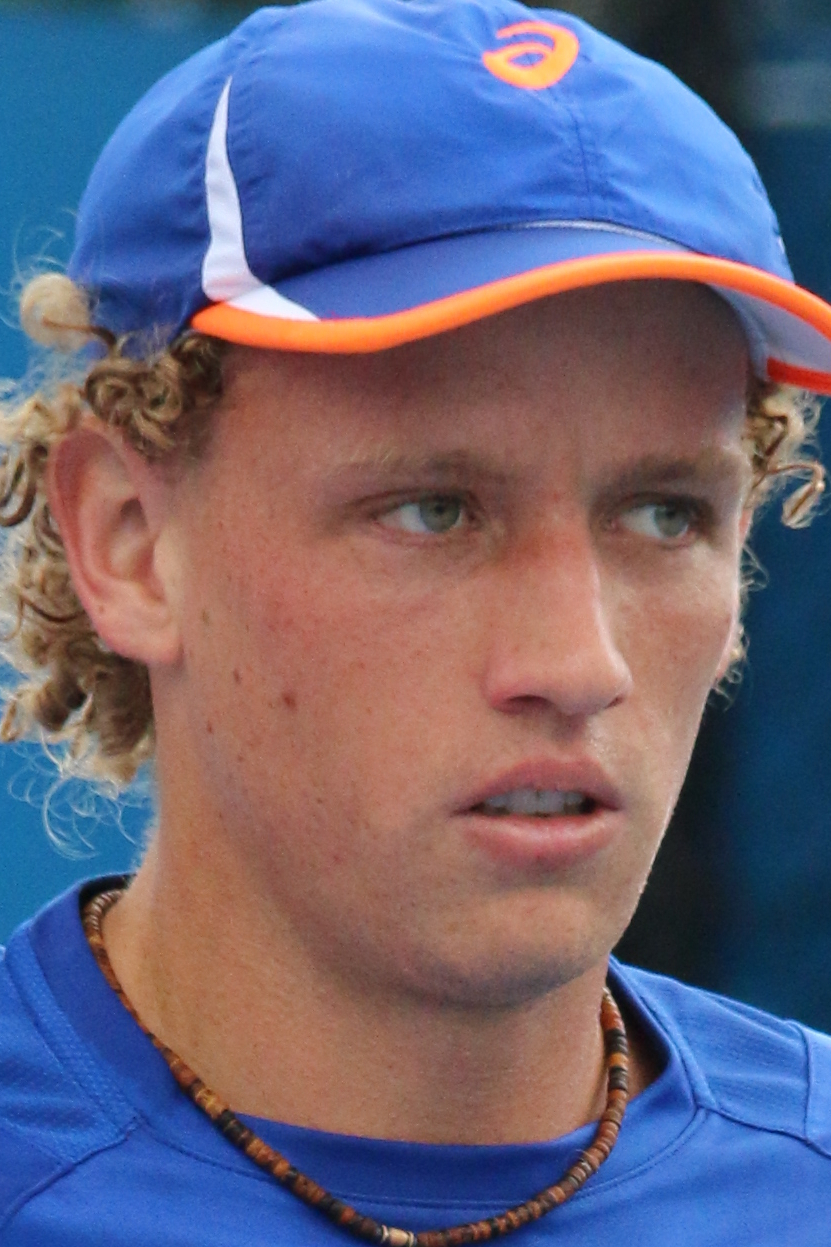
- Country (sports): Australia
- Born: 10 April 1992 (age 33)
- Plays: Right-handed (two-handed backhand)
- Prize money: $215,570

Singles
- Career record: 0–0
- Career titles: 0
- Highest ranking: No. 216 (27 August 2018)

Grand Slam singles results
- Australian Open: Q1 (2011, 2012, 2015, 2017, 2018, 2019)

Doubles
- Career record: 0–0
- Career titles: 0
- Highest ranking: No. 236 (9 May 2016)
- Last updated on: 3 October 2022.

Maverick Banes (born 10 April 1992) is an inactive Australian tennis player.

Banes has a career high ATP singles ranking of 216 achieved on 27 August 2018. He also has a career high doubles ranking of 236 achieved on 9 May 2016.

Banes has won 1 ATP Challenger singles title at the 2018 Gwangju Open.

== Challenger and Futures finals ==
=== Singles: 17 (8–9) ===
Legend (singles) ATP Challenger Tour (1–1) ITF Futures Tour (7–8)	Titles by surface Hard (2–8) Clay (6–1) Grass (0–0) Carpet (0–0)

Result	W–L	Date	Tournament	Tier	Surface	Opponent	Score
Loss	0–1	Nov 2011	USA F30, Pensacola	Futures	Clay	(Monaco) Benjamin Balleret	1–6, 7–6^{(7–2)}, 4–6
Win	1–1	May 2014	Croatia F10, Bol	Futures	Clay	(Australia) Jordan Thompson	7–6^{(8–6)}, 4–6, 6–3
Win	2–1	Jun 2014	Croatia F11, Bol	Futures	Clay	(Australia) Jake Eames	6–1, 6–3
Loss	2–2	Jul 2014	Spain F19, Dénia	Futures	Clay	(Argentina) Pedro Cachin	4–6, 6–3, 4–6
Loss	2–3	Aug 2014	Spain F20, Xàtiva	Futures	Clay	(Spain) Oriol Roca Batalla	2–6, 2–6
Loss	2–4	May 2015	Croatia F11, Bol	Futures	Clay	(Croatia) Duje Kekez	1–6, 2–6
Loss	2–5	Jun 2015	Croatia F12, Bol	Futures	Clay	(Austria) Michael Linzer	2–6, 6–3, 1–6
Loss	2–6	Nov 2015	Australia F11, Wollongong	Futures	Hard	(Australia) Dayne Kelly	6–7^{(1–7)}, 3–6
Loss	2–7	Jul 2016	China F11, Anning	Futures	Clay	(Austria) Bastian Trinker	6–7^{(5–7)}, 6–7^{(4–7)}
Win	3–7	Nov 2016	Australia F9, Wollongong	Futures	Hard	(United States) Jarmere Jenkins	6–7^{(6–8)}, 7–5, 6–2
Loss	3–8	Mar 2017	Australia F3, Canberra	Futures	Clay	(Australia) Marc Polmans	7–6^{(7–5)}, 6–7^{(1–7)}, 4–6
Win	4–8	Sep 2017	Australia F4, Alice Springs	Futures	Hard	(Australia) Harry Bourchier	7–5, 7–6^{(7–5)}
Win	5–8	Jun 2018	Singapore F3, Singapore	Futures	Hard	(United States) Nicholas S. Hu	6–4, 7–5
Win	6–8	Jul 2018	Hong Kong F2, Hong Kong	Futures	Hard	(Japan) Shintaro Imai	7–5, 6–2
Win	7–8	Aug 2018	Gwangju, South Korea	Challenger	Hard	(South Korea) Nam Ji-sung	6–3, 4–6, 6–4
Win	8–8	Oct 2018	Australia F8, Toowoomba	Futures	Hard	(Northern Mariana Islands) Colin Sinclair	6–4, 6–2
Loss	8–9	Jan 2019	Burnie, Australia	Challenger	Hard	(Canada) Steven Diez	5–7, 1–6

=== Doubles: 26 (12–14) ===
Legend (doubles) ATP Challenger Tour (0–2) ITF Futures Tour (12–12)	Titles by surface Hard (4–4) Clay (8–10) Grass (0–0) Carpet (0–0)

Result	W–L	Date	Tournament	Tier	Surface	Partner	Opponents	Score
Win	1–0	May 2012	Turkey F19, Mersin	Futures	Clay	(New Zealand) Sebastian Lavie	(Austria) Maximilian Neuchrist (Croatia) Mate Pavić	6–4, 3–6, [10–7]
Loss	1–1	May 2012	Turkey F20, Mersin	Futures	Clay	(New Zealand) Sebastian Lavie	(United Kingdom) James Feaver (Republic of Ireland) Daniel Glancy	6–7^{(5–7)}, 3–6
Loss	1–2	Jun 2012	Turkey F21, Mersin	Futures	Clay	(Australia) Brydan Klein	(Ukraine) Oleksandr Nedovyesov (Ukraine) Ivan Sergeyev	6–3, 1–6, [7–10]
Win	2–2	Jun 2013	Belgium F2, Havré	Futures	Clay	(Australia) Gavin van Peperzeel	(Belgium) Romain Barbosa (Belgium) Jordan Paquot	6–4, 6–4
Win	3–2	Mar 2014	Australia F2, Port Pirie	Futures	Hard	(Australia) Gavin van Peperzeel	(Australia) Bradley Mousley (Australia) Jordan Thompson	6–3, 6–3
Loss	3–3	May 2014	Great Britain F10, Edinburgh	Futures	Clay	(Australia) Gavin van Peperzeel	(United Kingdom) Jonny O'Mara (United Kingdom) Marcus Willis	6–7^{(3–7)}, 1–6
Loss	3–4	May 2014	Great Britain F11, Newcastle	Futures	Clay	(Australia) Gavin van Peperzeel	(United Kingdom) Jonny O'Mara (United Kingdom) Marcus Willis	6–7^{(8–10)}, 1–6
Loss	3–5	May 2014	Croatia F10, Bol	Futures	Clay	(Australia) Gavin van Peperzeel	(Australia) Matthew Barton (Australia) Jordan Thompson	6–2, 3–6, [3–10]
Loss	3–6	Jun 2014	Belgium F4, Havré	Futures	Clay	(Australia) Jacob Grills	(Belgium) Romain Barbosa (Belgium) Romain Bogaerts	4–6, 4–6
Win	4–6	Jul 2014	Spain F19, Dénia	Futures	Clay	(Australia) Jake Eames	(Spain) Juan-Samuel Arauzo-Martínez (Spain) David Vega Hernández	w/o
Win	5–6	Nov 2014	Australia F10, Wollongong	Futures	Hard	(Australia) Gavin van Peperzeel	(Australia) Luke Immanuel Harvey (Australia) Mitchell Williams Robins	6–2, 6–2
Loss	5–7	May 2015	Croatia F10, Bol	Futures	Clay	(Australia) Gavin van Peperzeel	(Brazil) Eduardo Dischinger (Brazil) Fabrício Neis	4–6, 5–7
Loss	5–8	May 2015	Croatia F11, Bol	Futures	Clay	(Australia) Gavin van Peperzeel	(Brazil) Eduardo Dischinger (Brazil) Fabrício Neis	2–6, 5–7
Win	6–8	Jun 2015	Croatia F12, Bol	Futures	Clay	(Australia) Gavin van Peperzeel	(Sweden) Jonathan Mridha (Sweden) Fred Simonsson	w/o
Win	7–8	Jun 2015	Netherlands F2, Breda	Futures	Clay	(Republic of Ireland) Sam Barry	(Netherlands) Sander Groen (France) Alexandre Sidorenko	6–3, 7–5
Win	8–8	Jul 2015	Netherlands F3, Middelburg	Futures	Clay	(Brazil) Fabrício Neis	(Netherlands) Niels Lootsma (Netherlands) Boy Westerhof	6–4, 6–4
Loss	8–9	Jul 2015	Belgium F6, Knokke	Futures	Clay	(Australia) Jacob Grills	(Australia) Steven de Waard (Australia) Marc Polmans	7–5, 6–7^{(2–7)}, [5–10]
Win	9–9	Aug 2015	Italy F21, Bolzano	Futures	Clay	(Brazil) Bruno Sant'Anna	(Italy) Omar Giacalone (Italy) Pietro Rondoni	6–3, 3–6, [10–7]
Win	10–9	Nov 2015	Australia F10, Wollongong	Futures	Hard	(New Zealand) Finn Tearney	(Australia) Steven de Waard (Australia) Marc Polmans	6–7^{(6–8)}, 7–5, [10–6]
Loss	10–10	Jan 2016	Canberra, Australia	Challenger	Hard	(Australia) Jarryd Chaplin	(Poland) Mariusz Fyrstenberg (Mexico) Santiago González	6–7^{(3–7)}, 3–6
Win	11–10	Jun 2016	Italy F13, Padua	Futures	Clay	(Australia) Gavin van Peperzeel	(Italy) Omar Giacalone (Italy) Matteo Volante	6–3, 6–3
Loss	11–11	Oct 2016	Australia F7, Toowoomba	Futures	Hard	(Australia) Gavin van Peperzeel	(United States) Nathan Pasha (Australia) Darren Polkinghorne	3–6, 4–6
Loss	11–12	Nov 2016	Australia F9, Wollongong	Futures	Hard	(Australia) Gavin van Peperzeel	(Australia) Daniel Nolan (New Zealand) Finn Tearney	4–6, 6–4, [5–10]
Loss	11–13	Mar 2017	Australia F2, Canberra	Futures	Clay	(Australia) Gavin van Peperzeel	(United States) Evan King (United States) Nathan Pasha	6–4, 3–6, [4–10]
Win	12–13	Oct 2017	Australia F5, Brisbane	Futures	Hard	(Australia) Blake Ellis	(United States) Nathan Pasha (Australia) Darren Polkinghorne	4–6, 6–1, [10–4]
Loss	12–14	Jan 2018	Playford, Australia	Challenger	Hard	(Australia) Jason Kubler	(United States) Mackenzie McDonald (United States) Tommy Paul	6–7^{(4–7)}, 4–6
