= Dane Propoggia =

Australian tennis player

- Country (sports): Australia
- Residence: Sydney
- Born: 24 April 1990 (age 35)
- Turned pro: 2008
- Plays: Right-handed
- Prize money: US$151,465

Singles
- Career record: 0–0
- Career titles: 0
- Highest ranking: No. 295 (2 February 2015)

Grand Slam singles results
- Australian Open: Q3 (2015)

Doubles
- Career record: 0–1
- Career titles: 0
- Highest ranking: No. 109 (8 July 2013)

Dane Propoggia (born 24 April 1990) is an Australian professional tennis player and competes mainly on the ATP Challenger Tour and ITF Futures, both in singles and doubles.

Propoggia reached his highest ATP singles ranking of No. 295 on 2 February 2015, and his highest ATP doubles ranking, of No. 109 on 8 July 2013.

== Career finals (12) ==
=== Singles: 7 (3 Titles) ===
Legend
ATP Challengers (0–0)
ITF Futures (3–4)

Outcome	No.	Date	Tournament	Surface	Opponent	Score
Runner-up	1.	3 May 2010	Australia F-4, Australia	Clay	(United Kingdom) Brydan Klein	5–7, 3–6
Runner-up	2.	6 August 2012	Germany F13, Germany	Clay	(Germany) Steven Moneke	2–6, 2–6
Winner	3.	11 May 2012	Thailand F5, Thailand	Hard	(Sweden) Robin Olin	6–3, 6–4
Runner-up	4.	5 August 2013	Turkey F31, Turkey	Hard	(Turkey) Marsel İlhan	2–6, 4–6
Runner-up	5.	3 March 2014	Australia F3. Australia	Grass	(Australia) Luke Saville	5–7, 7–6^{(7–5)}, 0–6
Winner	6.	28 April 2014	Korea F2, Korea	Hard	(South Korea) Min-Hyeok Cho	7–5, 3–6, 6–4
Winner	7.	22 June 2014	Turkey F21, Turkey	Hard	(Turkey) Barış Ergüden	3–6, 6–2, 6–1

=== Doubles (6) (4 Titles) ===
Legend
ATP Challengers (6)

Finals by surface
Hard (2–2)
Clay (2–0)
Grass (0–0)
Carpet (0–0)

Outcome	No.	Date	Tournament	Surface	Partnering	Opponents in the final	Score
Winners	1.	14 July 2012	San Benedetto, Italy	Clay	(Australia) Brydan Klein	(Italy) Stefano Ianni (Italy) Gianluca Naso	3–6, 6–4, [12–10]
Winners	2.	21 July 2012	Recanati, Italy	Hard	(Australia) Brydan Klein	(Croatia) Marin Draganja (Croatia) Dino Marcan	7–5, 2–6, [14–12]
Winners	3.	29 July 2012	Orbetello, Italy	Clay	(Italy) Stefano Ianni	(Italy) Alessio di Mauro (Italy) Simone Vagnozzi	6–3, 6–2
Runners-up	1.	22 September 2012	İzmir, Turkey	Hard	(Australia) Brydan Klein	(United Kingdom) David Rice (United Kingdom) Sean Thornley	6–7^{(8–10)}, 2–6
Runners-up	2.	2 February 2013	Burnie, Australia	Hard	(Australia) Brydan Klein	(South Africa) Ruan Roelofse (Australia) John-Patrick Smith	2–6, 2–6
Winner	4.	2 February 2013	2013 Nature's Way Sydney Tennis International – Men's doubles	Hard	(Australia) Brydan Klein	(Australia) Alex Bolt (Australia) Nick Kyrgios	6–4, 4–6, [11–9]
Runners-up	3.	21 September 2013	2013 Türk Telecom İzmir Cup – Doubles	Hard	(Australia) Brydan Klein	(United States) Austin Krajicek (United States) Tennys Sandgren	6–7^{(4–7)}, 4–6
Winner	5.	1 November 2014	2014 Latrobe City Traralgon ATP Challenger 1 – Doubles	Hard	(Australia) Brydan Klein	(United States) Jarmere Jenkins (United States) Mitchell Krueger	6–1, 1–6, [10–3]
Winner	6.	3 November 2014	Traralgon 2	Hard	(Australia) Brydan Klein	(New Zealand) Marcus Daniell (New Zealand) Artem Sitak	7–6^{(8–6)}, 3–6, [10–6]
Runners-up	4.	7 November 2015	2015 Canberra Tennis International – Men's doubles	Hard	(Australia) Brydan Klein	(Australia) Alex Bolt (Australia) Andrew Whittington	6–7^{(2–7)}, 3–6
Winners	7.	4 February 2017	2017 Burnie International – Men's doubles	Hard	(United Kingdom) Brydan Klein	(Australia) Steven de Waard (Australia) Luke Saville	6–3, 6–4
