= Brydan Klein =

Australian-born British tennis player

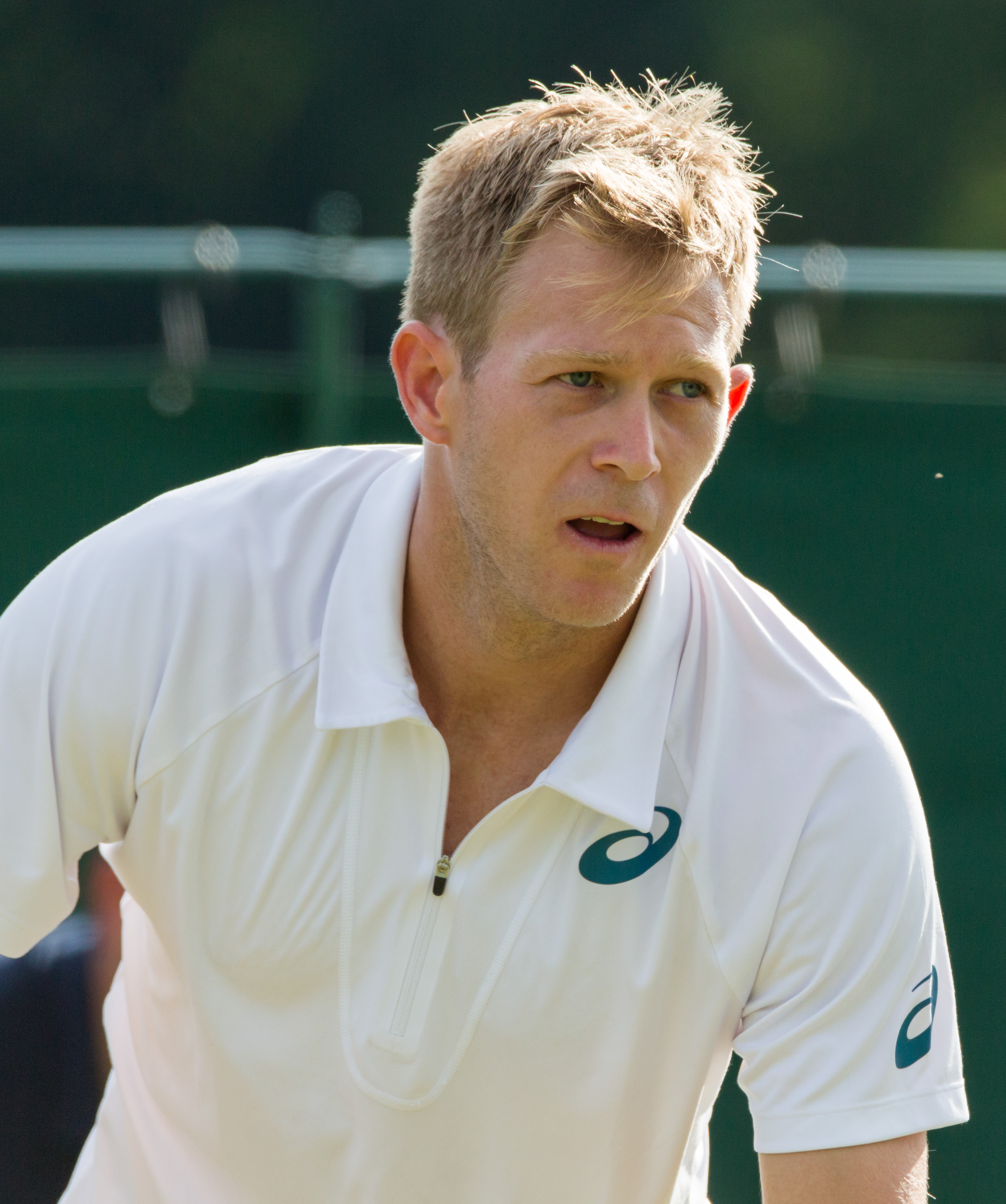
- Country (sports): Australia (2005–2013); Great Britain (2013–)
- Residence: London, United Kingdom
- Born: 31 December 1989 (age 36) Rockingham, Australia
- Height: 1.83 m (6 ft 0 in)
- Turned pro: 2005
- Plays: Right-handed (two-handed backhand)
- Prize money: $707,760

Singles
- Career record: 3–11 (Grand Slam, ATP Tour level, and Davis Cup)
- Career titles: 0
- Highest ranking: No. 169 (28 September 2015)

Grand Slam singles results
- Australian Open: 2R (2009)
- French Open: Q2 (2015)
- Wimbledon: 1R (2015, 2016, 2017)
- US Open: Q3 (2015)

Doubles
- Career record: 1–10
- Career titles: 0
- Highest ranking: No. 118 (18 March 2013)

Grand Slam doubles results
- Australian Open: 1R (2007, 2008, 2009, 2010)
- Wimbledon: 1R (2016, 2017)

Grand Slam mixed doubles results
- Australian Open: 1R (2008)
- Wimbledon: 1R (2017)

Team competitions
- Davis Cup: Asia/Oceania Zone Group I 1R (2009)
- Last updated on: 12 September 2025.

Brydan Klein (born 31 December 1989) is an Australian-born British former professional tennis player. As a junior, Klein won the 2007 Australian Open and reached a career-high top five in the ITF junior rankings. However, Klein has struggled to make the transition onto the men's professional circuit, failing to enter the top 150 or gain entry into any Grand Slam event without being given a Wild card.

Klein competed mainly on the ATP Challenger Tour.

== Junior career ==
Klein began his professional tennis career playing on the ITF Men's Circuit in various events across Australia aged just 15. He featured sporadically on the ITF Circuit throughout 2005 and 2006, winning his first title alongside Matthew Ebden in a doubles event in Traralgon in October 2006. During that year, he also competed at Challenger level for the first time in his career. At the start of 2007, Klein competed in the Australian Open Junior Championships, and won the event after beating Jonathan Eysseric in three sets in the final. This resulted in Klein reaching a career high juniors ranking of no. 4.

== Senior career ==
=== 2007–2008 ===
Throughout 2007, Klein began playing Futures tournaments on a much more regular basis, and secured his first singles title in Sawtell, Australia in October that year, beating Miles Armstrong 6–1, 6–3 in the final. At the start of the following year, he received a wildcard into the main draw of the 2008 Australian Open, although lost 4–6, 5–7, 4–6 to Paul Capdeville in the opening round. Shortly after, he returned to Futures action and earned his second singles title win in Mildura, defeating number one seed Nathan Healey in the final. He went on to win a further two singles titles during the year, both of which coming away from Australia, in New Zealand and Belarus respectively. Klein ended 2008 ranked no. 256, a ranking that was 350 places higher than his year-end 2007 ranking.

=== 2009–2012 ===
Klein received wildcard entries into both the Brisbane International and the 2009 Australian Open. A first-round loser in Brisbane, Klein acquired his first Grand Slam victory at the Australian Open against Björn Phau 6–4, 6–3, 4–6, 6–3, before falling to Stanislas Wawrinka in straight sets in the second round. Following his Australian Open efforts, Klein won the 2009 McDonald's Burnie International, the first challenger title win of his career. He did not lose a set during the tournament, securing the title courtesy of 6–3, 6–3 victory over Grega Žemlja in the final. Klein followed the win up by securing both singles and doubles Futures victories in Mildura the following week, having also won the singles event in 2008. He beat Matthew Ebden in the final of that tournament, before teaming up with him to win the doubles title. Following his impressive start to 2009, Klein was called up to represent Australia at Davis Cup level, and played in Australia's 3–2 win over Thailand in a Second Round match, although lost his match to Danai Udomchoke. He also entered the 2009 French Open, but lost in the opening qualifying round to Kevin Anderson. Klein began to play at Challenger level and on the ATP World Tour throughout 2009 to little success, although did reach a career singles high of no. 174 when he reached the last 16 during his controversial participation at the 2009 Aegon International. He ended 2009 by returning to playing at Futures level in Australia, with a year-end ranking of no. 200.

His 2010 campaign started slowly, with First Round qualifying defeats in Brisbane, Sydney and the 2010 Australian Open, before suffering a First Round loss in the Burnie Challenger, the tournament he had won a year earlier. By February 2010, his ranking had dropped 200 places to outside the top 400 after failing to defend his ranking points. Klein subsequently returned to the Futures Circuit in an attempt regain form, and was able to secure his first singles title in over a year when he defeated compatriot John Millman in three sets in Little Rock, Arkansas in April 2010. Klein returned to Australia, and proceeded to win two further Futures titles, both of which on clay, within the space of a week in early May that year. In the summer of 2010, he headed to North America to prepare for the 2010 US Open, and played in various Challenger tournaments as part of his preparation programme ahead of the tournament – reaching the quarter-final stage of both the Comerica Bank Challenger in Aptos, California, as well as the Challenger Banque Nationale de Granby in Granby, Quebec, Canada. Despite his extensive stay in the continent, Klein suffered a convincing 3–6, 1–6 loss to Kevin Kim in the opening qualifying round of the US Open. During the latter stages of 2010, Klein reached four straight finals in Futures tournaments in Australia and New Zealand, but lost all four. He ended 2010 ranked at no. 214.

Similarly to 2010, Klein's start to 2011 witnessed a number of First Round losses, including another opening round qualification defeat at the Australian Open, this time at the hands of Konstantin Kravchuk. Klein had been banned from competing for a main draw wildcard for the event following "a string of on-court misdemeanours". Todd Woodbridge, Tennis Australia's director of men's tennis, stated the ban was for "numerous accounts of unacceptable behaviour at tournaments both locally and internationally". During the first three months of the year, Klein won just one main draw match from nine tournaments. He struggled for form throughout the year, and competed at Futures level for the remainder of his 2011 campaign, yielding just one singles title in Kalgoorlie, Australia, in October. Klein remained in Europe for most of the year, and won five doubles titles during his time there – and a further three towards the latter stages of the year in Australia, all of which at Futures level. Klein ended the year ranked no. 451 in singles, a drop of over 200 places from his 2010 ranking.

Klein took a three-month break from the Circuit from October 2011 to late January 2012, returning to action in the qualifying draw at the 2012 McDonald's Burnie International, although was beaten by Dane Propoggia in straight sets in the second round of qualifying. The following week, he improved to reach the quarter-finals of the 2012 Caloundra International. Klein then reached the final of the Futures event in Mildura in February 2012, an event that he had previously won twice, but lost to Hiroki Moriya in three sets. He spent the summer months of the year playing in Turkey and Spain Futures events; beating Frenchman Jules Marie to win in Bakio, Spain, as well as securing two titles in Turkey by beating the young Italian Lorenzo Giustino in the final in Tekirdağ and then Mohamed Safwat in Antalya. He also won consecutive Challenger doubles titles alongside compatriot Dane Propoggia; firstly in San Benedetto del Tronto and then in Recanati. Klein's fine form during the summer continued when he reached the semi-finals of the 2012 President's Cup in Astana, Kazakhstan, before losing to the eventual champion, Evgeny Donskoy. His performances throughout the year enabled him to earn a place in qualifying at the 2012 US Open, where he was defeated by Karol Beck in the second round of qualification. During the year, he won three singles titles, as well as twelve doubles titles, ending 2012 ranked at no. 241 in singles and no. 134 in doubles.

=== 2013– ===
Klein began the year by competing at the 2013 Australian Open, but lost in straight sets in the first round of qualifying to Riccardo Ghedin. Klein and doubles partner Propoggia reached another Challenger doubles final, but lost to the pairing of John-Patrick Smith and Ruan Roelofse at the 2013 McDonald's Burnie International. The pair would go one better in early March 2013, securing their third Challenger title by beating Alex Bolt and Nick Kyrgios in the final of the 2013 Nature's Way Sydney Tennis International. The result gave Klein a career high doubles ranking of no. 118.

==== Switch to Great Britain ====
In April 2013, the LTA, the national governing body of tennis in Great Britain, were informed of Klein's desire to switch his nationality from Australian to British through the International Tennis Federation. A month later, it was announced that Klein had completed his switch to playing under a British licence. Despite being born in Rockingham, Australia, his mother was from Manchester, England, and therefore Klein was able to switch allegiance. The move followed Tennis Australia's decision to withdraw their support for Klein following a "fractured relationship" with Klein having "a very chequered history of on-court behaviours". Klein stated it was a move he had been thinking about for four years — "It was a very difficult decision and I've had it in the back of my mind for four years, but haven't wanted to go forward with it. Finally, I thought, 'Look, I'm 23, I need a new environment, I need to do something to give myself a chance to improve my game'." The move also allowed Klein to "ease the financial burden" that has meant he had to fund the previous three years of touring himself, only gaining access to a coach when he was competing in Turkey. He hoped the move would help realise his dream of making a "living out of the sport I love, which would be making top 100 singles and top 50 doubles". Klein also spoke of further aspirations of competing for the Great Britain Davis Cup team — "In the years to come, there's Davis Cup if they want me and my ranking is high enough and, of course, they have a grand slam the same as us, so there's opportunities there. No.3 is within shooting range of playing Davis Cup, but obviously I'm not going to go in expecting to play Davis Cup for a few years."

Shortly after the switch, Klein entered the qualifying for the 2013 French Open, but lost in straight sets in the first round of qualification to French wildcard, Mathias Bourgue.

== Six-month ban ==
In July 2009, Klein accepted a six-month ban from the ATP after racially abusing an opponent at a tournament in England. He used the racist term "kaffir" to describe South African player Raven Klaasen at the grasscourt event in Eastbourne. He was suspended by the Australian Institute of Sport, meaning he received no funding, coaching or fitness support during the length of his ban. He agreed to complete a racial sensitivity course, and issued a public apology for his actions, stating — ""During the second set, after losing a point, I audibly used a racial slur. It was not my intention to racially vilify my opponent or cause offence to anybody else and I am deeply embarrassed that I behaved in this manner. I deeply regret my serious error in judgment in using this word and I am very sorry for the offence this has caused. After the match I called my opponent Raven and apologised for what had happened and also apologised for any offence caused to his support team". He was fined $14,000 by the ATP, the maximum possible amount by the organisation, and later fined a further $10,000 following a full investigation into the incident.

Talking about the incident in December 2010, Klein's father said — "It is sad to see him continually punished for what was, in truth, one single word muttered inaudibly over 18 months ago. It was reported inaccurately then and continues to be. The way he was disciplined, you would think it was a constant, repeated offence. What pains me most is the way that, more than a year later, Brydan's indiscretion is still being dragged up again and again. He didn't actually know what the meaning of the word 'kaffir' was. He actually heard the South African players say it. He thought it was a swear word, so when he said it, he obviously had no idea what he was saying. He was only 18 years old and the other person didn't even hear it and it didn't really affect the match. I was there, sitting close to where Brydan was as humanly as possible apart from being on the court, and you couldn't hear anything. If you had been there you wouldn't have heard anything either so it's not like he was ranting or raving at his opponent, calling him names and being racist, because he's anything but. One day he will be able to tell the truth but right now he is stuck from telling the truth."

== Challengers and Futures finals ==
=== Singles: 33 (20–13) ===
Legend (singles) ATP Challenger Tour (1–0) ITF Futures Tour (19–13)	Titles by surface Hard (13–10) Clay (3–0) Grass (4–3)

Result	W–L	Date	Tournament	Tier	Surface	Opponent	Score
Win	1–0	Oct 2007	Australia F6, Sawtell	Futures	Clay	(Australia) Miles Armstrong	6–1, 6–3
Win	2–0	Feb 2008	Australia F1, Mildura	Futures	Grass	(Australia) Nathan Healey	6–1 ret.
Win	3–0	Mar 2008	New Zealand F2, Hamilton	Futures	Hard	(South Korea) Young-Jun Kim	6–4, 7–5
Win	4–0	Jun 2008	Belarus F2, Minsk	Futures	Hard	(Belarus) Sergey Betov	7–6^{(7–5)}, 6–1
Loss	4–1	Jul 2008	Great Britain F9, Felixstowe	Futures	Grass	(Netherlands) Michel Koning	6–7^{(6–8)}, 6–7^{(4–7)}
Win	5–1	Feb 2009	Burnie, Australia	Challenger	Hard	(Slovenia) Grega Žemlja	6–3, 6–3
Win	6–1	Feb 2009	Australia F1, Mildura	Futures	Grass	(Australia) Matthew Ebden	6–0, 6–4
Win	7–1	Apr 2010	USA F9, Little Rock	Futures	Hard	(Australia) John Millman	6–3, 3–6, 6–3
Win	8–1	May 2010	Australia F3, Ipswich	Futures	Clay	(Australia) Jason Kubler	6–3, 6–4
Win	9–1	May 2010	Australia F4, Bundaberg	Futures	Clay	(Australia) Dane Propoggia	7–5, 6–3
Loss	9–2	Oct 2010	Australia F9, Happy Valley	Futures	Hard	(Australia) Nick Lindahl	6–7^{(5–7)}, 3–6
Loss	9–3	Nov 2010	Australia F10, Kalgoorlie	Futures	Hard	(Canada) Érik Chvojka	6–3, 3–6, 6–7^{(4–7)}
Loss	9–4	Nov 2010	Australia F11, Esperance	Futures	Hard	(Germany) Sebastian Rieschick	3–6, 4–6
Loss	9–5	Nov 2010	New Zealand F1, Wellington	Futures	Hard	(Germany) Sebastian Rieschick	5–7, 3–6
Win	10–5	Oct 2011	Australia F9, Kalgoorlie	Futures	Hard	(Australia) Benjamin Mitchell	7–5, 6–3
Loss	10–6	Feb 2012	Australia F2, Mildura	Futures	Grass	(Japan) Hiroki Moriya	4–6, 6–4, 2–6
Loss	10–7	May 2012	Turkey F17, Antalya	Futures	Hard	(Spain) Arnau Brugués Davi	2–6, 4–6
Win	11–7	Jun 2012	Turkey F23, Tekirdağ	Futures	Hard	(Italy) Lorenzo Giustino	6–3, 6–1
Win	12–7	Jul 2012	Spain F19, Bakio	Futures	Hard	(France) Jules Marie	6–2, 6–2
Win	13–7	Sep 2012	Turkey F34, Antalya	Futures	Hard	(Egypt) Mohamed Safwat	2–6, 7–6^{(9–7)}, 6–1
Loss	13–8	Oct 2012	Turkey F38, Antalya	Futures	Hard	(Switzerland) Stéphane Bohli	6–7^{(3–7)}, 6–7^{(4–7)}
Loss	13–9	Dec 2012	Indonesia F4, Jakarta	Futures	Hard	(Croatia) Mate Pavić	4–6, 7–6^{(7–2)}, 6–7^{(5–7)}
Win	14–9	Aug 2014	Spain F21, Béjar	Futures	Hard	(Portugal) Frederico Ferreira Silva	6–3, 6–3
Loss	14–10	Aug 2014	Spain F24, Pozoblanco	Futures	Hard	(United Kingdom) Edward Corrie	4–6, 6–7^{(4–7)}
Win	15–10	Oct 2014	Australia F6, Alice Springs	Futures	Hard	(Australia) Dayne Kelly	6–1, 6–4
Win	16–10	Nov 2014	Australia F9, Wollongong	Futures	Hard	(Australia) Andrew Whittington	6–3, 6–3
Win	17–10	Jan 2015	Australia F1, Adelaide	Futures	Hard	(Australia) Omar Jasika	6–4, 6–7^{(3–7)}, 6–2
Win	18–10	Apr 2017	Indonesia F4, Jakarta	Futures	Hard	(Indonesia) Christopher Rungkat	4–6, 6–2, 7–6^{(7–5)}
Loss	18–11	Apr 2017	Indonesia F5, Jakarta	Futures	Hard	(Chinese Taipei) Chen Ti	6–3, 6–7^{(2–7)}, 3–6
Loss	18–12	Sep 2018	Australia F5, Cairns	Futures	Hard	(Australia) Jacob Grills	1–6, 7–6^{(7–2)}, 5–7
Win	19–12	Mar 2019	M25 Albury	Futures	Grass	(Australia) Matthew Romios	6–1, 6–2
Loss	19–13	Mar 2019	M25 Mildura	Futures	Grass	(Australia) Dayne Kelly	1–6, 6–4, 4–6
Win	20–13	Mar 2020	M25 Mildura	Futures	Grass	(Japan) Rio Noguchi	7–5, 6–3

=== Doubles: 81 (48–33) ===
Legend (doubles) ATP Challenger Tour (10–11) ITF Futures Tour (38–22)	Titles by surface Hard (36–23) Clay (7–3) Grass (4–7) Carpet (1–0)

Result	W–L	Date	Tournament	Tier	Surface	Partner	Opponents	Score
Win	1–0	Oct 2006	Australia F10, Traralgon	Futures	Hard	(Australia) Matthew Ebden	(United States) James Cerretani (United States) Philip Stolt	6–3, 6–3
Win	2–0	Aug 2007	Great Britain F13, Ilkley	Futures	Grass	(United Kingdom) Ian Flanagan	(New Zealand) Daniel King-Turner (France) Fabrice Martin	6–3, 6–1
Win	3–0	Oct 2007	Australia F8, Traralgon	Futures	Hard	(Australia) Matthew Ebden	(Australia) Andrew Coelho (Australia) Greg Jones	7–6^{(8–6)}, 6–1
Loss	3–1	Feb 2008	Australia F1, Mildura	Futures	Grass	(Australia) Andrew Coelho	(Australia) Sam Groth (Australia) Nathan Healey	3–6, 4–6
Win	4–1	Mar 2008	New Zealand F1, Wellington	Futures	Hard	(Australia) Andrew Coelho	(Australia) Isaac Frost (Australia) Leon Frost	6–1, 6–3
Loss	4–2	Mar 2008	New Zealand F1, Hamilton	Futures	Hard	(Australia) Andrew Coelho	(Australia) Nathan Healey (New Zealand) Mikal Statham	5–7, 6–3, [8–10]
Loss	4–3	Apr 2008	China F3, Taizhou	Futures	Hard	(Australia) Matthew Ebden	(India) Karan Rastogi (India) Ashutosh Singh	2–6, 3–6
Win	5–3	Jun 2008	Belarus F1, Minsk	Futures	Hard	(Australia) Matthew Ebden	(Latvia) Deniss Pavlovs (Israel) Dekel Valtzer	6–3, 6–2
Win	6–3	Jul 2008	Great Britain F9, Felixstowe	Futures	Grass	(Australia) Matthew Ebden	(Australia) Sadik Kadir (United States) Shane La Porte	6–4, 7–6^{(7–5)}
Win	7–3	Feb 2009	Australia F1, Mildura	Futures	Grass	(Australia) Matthew Ebden	(Australia) Kaden Hensel (Australia) Adam Hubble	7–5, 7–6^{(9–7)}
Win	8–3	Nov 2009	Australia F10, Kalgoorlie	Futures	Hard	(Australia) Robert Smeets	(Australia) Dane Propoggia (Australia) Matt Reid	6–3, 7–6^{(7–5)}
Win	9–3	Apr 2010	USA F8, Mobile	Futures	Hard	(Australia) John Millman	(Australia) Kaden Hensel (New Zealand) Jose Statham	4–6, 6–4, [10–6]
Loss	9–4	Apr 2010	USA F9, Little Rock	Futures	Hard	(Australia) John Millman	(United States) Lester Cook (United States) Brett Joelson	4–6, 6–3, [7–10]
Win	10–4	May 2010	Australia F3, Ipswich	Futures	Clay	(Australia) Dane Propoggia	(New Zealand) Marcus Daniell (New Zealand) Logan MacKenzie	6–2, 6–3
Win	11–4	May 2010	Australia F4, Bundaberg	Futures	Clay	(Australia) Dane Propoggia	(Australia) Michael Look (New Zealand) Logan MacKenzie	6–1, 6–0
Win	12–4	Nov 2010	Australia F11, Esperance	Futures	Clay	(Australia) Nima Roshan	(Australia) Colin Ebelthite (Australia) Adam Feeney	6–3, 6–4
Win	13–4	Nov 2010	New Zealand F1, Wellington	Futures	Hard	(Australia) Dane Propoggia	(Australia) Nima Roshan (New Zealand) Jose Statham	4–6, 6–1, [10–1]
Loss	13–5	Dec 2010	Australia F13, Bendigo	Futures	Hard	(Australia) Adam Hubble	(Australia) Colin Ebelthite (Australia) Adam Feeney	2–6, 4–6
Win	14–5	Apr 2011	Turkey F14, Antalya	Futures	Hard	(Turkey) Tuna Altuna	(Belarus) Aliaksandr Bury (Ukraine) Vladyslav Klymenko	6–4, 6–3
Win	15–5	May 2011	Turkey F15, Antalya	Futures	Hard	(Turkey) Tuna Altuna	(Moldova) Andrei Ciumac (Russia) Dmitri Sitak	6–4, 6–3
Win	16–5	Jul 2011	Germany F8, Römerberg	Futures	Clay	(Argentina) Juan-Pablo Amado	(Czech Republic) Roman Jebavý (Romania) Andrei Mlendea	6–4, 6–1
Win	17–5	Aug 2011	Turkey F22, İzmir	Futures	Clay	(Australia) Dane Propoggia	(Moldova) Andrei Ciumac (Greece) Paris Gemouchidis	3–6, 6–3, [10–5]
Win	18–5	Aug 2011	Turkey F23, Istanbul	Futures	Clay	(Australia) Dane Propoggia	(Italy) Riccardo Ghedin (India) Vijay Sundar Prashanth	6–3, 7–6^{(7–3)}
Win	19–5	Sep 2011	Australia F5, Alice Springs	Futures	Hard	(Australia) James Lemke	(China) Gao Peng (China) Gao Wan	6–1, 6–1
Win	20–5	Sep 2011	Australia F6, Cairns	Futures	Hard	(Australia) James Lemke	(South Korea) Jae-Sung An (Indonesia) Elbert Sie	Walkover
Win	21–5	Oct 2011	Australia F8, Esperance	Futures	Hard	(New Zealand) Jose Statham	(China) Gao Peng (China) Gao Wan	7–5, 6–3
Loss	21–6	Oct 2011	Australia F9, Kalgoorlie	Futures	Hard	(New Zealand) Jose Statham	(Australia) Michael Look (United States) Nicolas Meister	6–2, 6–7^{(6–8)}, [5–10]
Win	22–6	Feb 2012	Australia F1, Toowoomba	Futures	Hard	(Australia) Dane Propoggia	(Australia) Luke Saville (Australia) Andrew Whittington	7–6^{(7–4)}, 6–2
Loss	22–7	Mar 2012	Australia F3, Ipswich	Futures	Clay	(New Zealand) Jose Statham	(Australia) Adam Feeney (Australia) Adam Hubble	4–6, 4–6
Win	23–7	Apr 2012	Turkey F16, Antalya	Futures	Hard	(Turkey) Tuna Altuna	(Poland) Adam Chadaj (Ukraine) Volodymyr Uzhylovskyi	6–2, 6–4
Win	24–7	May 2012	Turkey F17, Antalya	Futures	Hard	(Turkey) Tuna Altuna	(Ukraine) Vadim Alekseenko (Russia) Sergei Krotiouk	6–1, 6–3
Win	25–7	May 2012	Turkey F18, Antalya	Futures	Hard	(Turkey) Tuna Altuna	(Russia) Ilya Belyaev (Turkey) Barış Ergüden	6–0, 6–3
Loss	25–8	Jun 2012	Turkey F21, Mersin	Futures	Clay	(Australia) Maverick Banes	(Ukraine) Aleksandr Nedovyesov (Ukraine) Ivan Sergeyev	6–3, 1–6, [7–10]
Win	26–8	Jul 2012	Spain F19, Bakio	Futures	Hard	(France) Fabrice Martin	(Spain) Juan-Samuel Arauzo-Martinez (Spain) Inigo Santos-Fernandez	7–5, 6–1
Win	27–8	Jul 2012	San Benedetto, Italy	Challenger	Clay	(Australia) Dane Propoggia	(Italy) Stefano Ianni (Italy) Gianluca Naso	3–6, 6–4, [12–10]
Win	28–8	Jul 2012	Recanati, Italy	Challenger	Hard	(Australia) Dane Propoggia	(Croatia) Marin Draganja (Croatia) Dino Marcan	7–5, 2–6, [14–12]
Loss	28–9	Aug 2012	Qarshi, Uzbekistan	Challenger	Hard	(Japan) Yasutaka Uchiyama	(Chinese Taipei) Lee Hsin-han (Chinese Taipei) Peng Hsien-yin	7–6^{(7–5)}, 4–6, [4–10]
Win	29–9	Sep 2012	Turkey F34, Antalya	Futures	Hard	(Turkey) Tuna Altuna	(Slovakia) Marko Danis (United Kingdom) George Morgan	6–3, 6–4
Loss	29–10	Sep 2012	İzmir, Turkey	Challenger	Hard	(Australia) Dane Propoggia	(United Kingdom) David Rice (United Kingdom) Sean Thornley	6–7^{(8–10)}, 2–6
Win	30–10	Sep 2012	Turkey F37, Antalya	Futures	Hard	(Australia) Dane Propoggia	(Italy) Matteo Donati (Italy) Francesco Picco	6–1, 6–2
Win	31–10	Oct 2012	Turkey F38, Antalya	Futures	Hard	(Moldova) Maxim Dubarenco	(Italy) Edoardo Eremin (New Zealand) Artem Sitak	6–4, 3–6, [11–9]
Win	32–10	Nov 2012	Thailand F5, Phuket	Futures	Hard (i)	(Australia) Dane Propoggia	(France) Antoine Escoffier (United Kingdom) Alexander Ward	6–3, 6–2
Loss	32–11	Dec 2012	Indonesia F3, Jakarta	Futures	Hard	(Australia) Dane Propoggia	(Germany) Tim Pütz (New Zealand) Michael Venus	5–7, 3–6
Win	33–11	Dec 2012	Indonesia F4, Jakarta	Futures	Hard	(Australia) Dane Propoggia	(Indonesia) Nesa Arta (Indonesia) Hendri Susilo Pramono	6–4, 6–2
Loss	33–12	Feb 2013	Burnie, Australia	Challenger	Hard	(Australia) Dane Propoggia	(South Africa) Ruan Roelofse (Australia) John-Patrick Smith	2–6, 2–6
Win	34–12	Feb 2013	Sydney, Australia	Challenger	Hard	(Australia) Dane Propoggia	(Australia) Alex Bolt (Australia) Nick Kyrgios	6–4, 4–6, [11–9]
Loss	34–13	Apr 2013	China F1, Chengdu	Futures	Hard	(Thailand) Danai Udomchoke	(Japan) Yuichi Ito (Japan) Hiroki Kondo	4–6, 4–6
Loss	34–14	Apr 2013	China F3, Yuxi	Futures	Hard	(New Zealand) Jose Statham	(Japan) Hiroki Moriya (Japan) Yasutaka Uchiyama	6–2, 4–6, [6–10]
Loss	34–15	Jul 2013	Great Britain F12, Manchester	Futures	Grass	(Australia) Zach Itzstein	(France) Albano Olivetti (United Kingdom) Neal Skupski	6–7^{(4–7)}, 3–6
Loss	34–16	Jul 2013	Istanbul, Turkey	Challenger	Hard	(South Africa) Ruan Roelofse	(Republic of Ireland) James Cluskey (France) Fabrice Martin	6–3, 3–6, [5–10]
Win	35–16	Jul 2013	Turkey F30, Istanbul	Futures	Hard	(Australia) Dane Propoggia	(Turkey) Tuna Altuna (Turkey) Barış Ergüden	6–1, 6–4
Win	36–16	Jul 2013	Turkey F31, İzmir	Futures	Hard	(Australia) Dane Propoggia	(France) Dorian Descloix (Spain) Jaime Pulgar-Garcia	5–7, 7–5, [10–4]
Loss	36–17	Sep 2013	İzmir, Turkey	Challenger	Hard	(Australia) Dane Propoggia	(United States) Austin Krajicek (United States) Tennys Sandgren	6–7^{(4–7)}, 4–6
Loss	36–18	Apr 2014	Great Britain F9, Bournemouth	Futures	Clay	(Australia) Jake Eames	(United Kingdom) Lewis Burton (United Kingdom) Marcus Willis	1–6, 5–7
Loss	36–19	Jul 2014	Great Britain F13, Ilkley	Futures	Grass	(United Kingdom) Joshua Ward-Hibbert	(United Kingdom) Lewis Burton (United Kingdom) Edward Corrie	2–6, 4–6
Loss	36–20	Aug 2014	Segovia, Spain	Challenger	Hard	(Croatia) Nikola Mektić	(Russia) Victor Baluda (Russia) Alexander Kudryavtsev	2–6, 6–4, [3–10]
Win	37–20	Aug 2014	Spain F21, Béjar	Futures	Hard	(Australia) Dane Propoggia	(Spain) Ivan Arenas-Gualda (Spain) Jaime Pulgar-Garcia	6–1, 7–6^{(7–3)}
Loss	37–21	Oct 2014	Australia F6, Alice Springs	Futures	Hard	(Australia) Dane Propoggia	(United States) Jarmere Jenkins (United States) Mitchell Krueger	4–6, 4–6
Loss	37–22	Oct 2014	Australia F7, Cairns	Futures	Hard	(Australia) Dane Propoggia	(Japan) Yuya Kibi (Japan) Takuto Niki	6–1, 6–7^{(2–7)}, [4–10]
Win	38–22	Nov 2014	Traralgon, Australia	Challenger	Hard	(Australia) Dane Propoggia	(United States) Jarmere Jenkins (United States) Mitchell Krueger	6–1, 1–6, [10–3]
Win	39–22	Nov 2014	Traralgon, Australia (2)	Challenger	Hard	(Australia) Dane Propoggia	(New Zealand) Marcus Daniell (New Zealand) Artem Sitak	7–6^{(8–6)}, 3–6, [10–6]
Win	40–22	Dec 2014	Thailand F11, Bangkok	Futures	Hard	(United Kingdom) David Rice	(Thailand) Pruchya Isaro (Thailand) Nuttanon Kadchapanan	3–6, 7–6^{(7–1)}, [10–8]
Win	41–22	Aug 2015	Lexington, US	Challenger	Hard	(Australia) Carsten Ball	(South Africa) Dean O'Brien (South Africa) Ruan Roelofse	6–4, 7–6^{(7–4)}
Loss	41–23	Nov 2015	Canberra, Australia	Challenger	Hard	(Australia) Dane Propoggia	(Australia) Alex Bolt (Australia) Andrew Whittington	6–7^{(2–7)}, 3–6
Win	42–23	Nov 2015	Toyota, Japan	Challenger	Carpet (i)	(Australia) Matt Reid	(Italy) Riccardo Ghedin (Chinese Taipei) Yi Chu-huan	6–2, 7–6^{(7–3)}
Loss	42–24	Nov 2016	Charlottesville, US	Challenger	Hard (i)	(South Africa) Ruan Roelofse	(United States) Brian Baker (Australia) Sam Groth	3–6, 3–6
Win	43–24	Feb 2017	Burnie, Australia	Challenger	Hard	(Australia) Dane Propoggia	(Australia) Steven de Waard (Australia) Luke Saville	6–3, 6–4
Loss	43–25	Jun 2017	Ilkley, UK	Challenger	Grass	(United Kingdom) Joe Salisbury	(India) Leander Paes (Canada) Adil Shamasdin	2–6, 6–2, [8–10]
Win	44–25	Oct 2017	Stockton, US	Challenger	Hard	(United Kingdom) Joe Salisbury	(United States) Denis Kudla (Latvia) Miķelis Lībietis	6–2, 6–4
Win	45–25	Oct 2017	Las Vegas, US	Challenger	Hard	(United Kingdom) Joe Salisbury	(Mexico) Hans Hach Verdugo (United States) Dennis Novikov	6–3, 4–6, [10–3]
Loss	45–26	Apr 2018	Guadalajara, Mexico	Challenger	Hard	(South Africa) Ruan Roelofse	(El Salvador) Marcelo Arévalo (Mexico) Miguel Ángel Reyes-Varela	6–7^{(3–7)}, 5–7
Loss	45–27	Sep 2018	Australia F6, Darwin	Futures	Hard	(Australia) Scott Puodziunas	(Australia) Jeremy Beale (Australia) Thomas Fancutt	6–7^{(4–7)}, 3–6
Loss	45–28	Oct 2018	Australia F7, Brisbane	Futures	Hard	(Australia) Scott Puodziunas	(Australia) Jeremy Beale (Australia) Thomas Fancutt	6–2, 4–6, [6–10]
Loss	45–29	Oct 2018	Australia F8, Toowoomba	Futures	Hard	(Australia) Scott Puodziunas	(Australia) Blake Ellis (Australia) Luke Saville	4–6, 7–6^{(7–2)}, [2–10]
Win	46–29	Mar 2019	M25 Albury	Futures	Grass	(Australia) Scott Puodziunas	(India) Arjun Kadhe (Australia) Jason Taylor	4–6, 7–5, [11–9]
Loss	46–30	Mar 2019	M25 Mildura	Futures	Grass	(Australia) Scott Puodziunas	(Australia) Calum Puttergill (Australia) Brandon Walkin	6–7^{(4–7)}, 7–6^{(7–3)}, [16–18]
Win	47–30	Sep 2019	M25 Darwin	Futures	Hard	(Australia) Dayne Kelly	(Australia) Thomas Fancutt (Australia) Matthew Romios	7–5, 7–5
Win	48–30	Oct 2019	M25 Toowoomba	Futures	Hard	(Australia) Scott Puodziunas	(Chinese Taipei) Hsu Yu-hsiou (Ukraine) Vladyslav Orlov	6–3, 6–4
Loss	48–31	Oct 2019	Traralgon, Australia	Challenger	Hard	(Australia) Scott Puodziunas	(Australia) Max Purcell (Australia) Luke Saville	7–6^{(7–2)}, 3–6, [4–10]
Loss	48–32	Mar 2020	M25 Mildura	Futures	Grass	(Australia) Scott Puodziunas	(Australia) Jeremy Beale (Australia) Thomas Fancutt	6–4, 6–7^{(6–8)}, [3–10]
Loss	48–33	Mar 2020	M25 Geelong	Futures	Grass	(Australia) Scott Puodziunas	(Australia) Adam Taylor (Australia) Jason Taylor	w/o
