= 2012 McDonald's Burnie International – Men's doubles =

Men's doubles
- 2012 McDonald's Burnie International

Final
- Champions: (Australia) John Peers (Australia) John-Patrick Smith
- Runners-up: (India) Divij Sharan (India) Vishnu Vardhan
- Score: 6–2, 6–4

Events
Singles	men	women
Doubles	men	women
← 2011 ·	Burnie International	· 2013 →

Philip Bester and Peter Polansky were the defending champions but decided not to participate.
John Peers and John-Patrick Smith won the final against Divij Sharan and Vishnu Vardhan, 6–2, 6–4.

== Seeds ==
1. (United States) John Paul Fruttero / (South Africa) Raven Klaasen (quarterfinals)
2. (Australia) Adam Feeney / (Australia) Chris Guccione (first round)
3. (Uzbekistan) Denis Istomin / (Ukraine) Denys Molchanov (first round)
4. (India) Divij Sharan / (India) Vishnu Vardhan (final)

== Draw ==
=== Key ===
- Q = Qualifier
- WC = Wild card
- LL = Lucky loser
- Alt = Alternate
- SE = Special exempt
- PR = Protected ranking
- ITF = ITF entry
- JE = Junior exempt
- w/o = Walkover
- r = Retired
- d = Defaulted
- SR = Special ranking

=== Draw ===
First round
1	(United States) J P Fruttero (South Africa) R Klaasen	w/o
(Chinese Taipei) T Chen (Uzbekistan) F Dustov
(Australia) Nima Roshan (New Zealand) J Statham	6	7^{8}
(Australia) B Mitchell (Australia) M Reid	0	6^{6}
4	(India) D Sharan (India) V Vardhan	6	6
(China) Li Z (China) Zhang Z	2	2
(Australia) C Ebelthite (Australia) M Matosevic	6	7
WC	(Australia) B Klein (Australia) J Millman	4	5
(Germany) S Rieschick (Thailand) D Udomchoke	6	6
(Slovakia) K Čapkovič (Germany) A Satschko	1	4
(Canada) É Chvojka (Australia) A Hubble	7	4	[10]
3	(Uzbekistan) D Istomin (Ukraine) D Molchanov	5	6	[7]
WC	(Australia) J Lemke (Australia) D Propoggia	4	1
WC	(Australia) J Peers (Australia) J-P Smith	6	6
(Australia) S Groth (Australia) G Jones	7^{7}	7
2	(Australia) A Feeney (Australia) C Guccione	6^{4}	5

Quarterfinals
1	(United States) J P Fruttero (South Africa) R Klaasen	6^{7}	6^{5}
(Australia) N Roshan (New Zealand) J Statham	7^{9}	7^{7}
4	(India) D Sharan (India) V Vardhan	6^{4}	6	[10]
(Australia) C Ebelthite (Australia) M Matosevic	7^{7}	3	[8]
(Germany) S Rieschick (Thailand) D Udomchoke	6	5	[13]
(Canada) É Chvojka (Australia) A Hubble	2	7	[11]
WC	(Australia) J Peers (Australia) J-P Smith	7^{8}	4	[10]
(Australia) S Groth (Australia) G Jones	6^{6}	6	[5]

Semifinals
(Australia) N Roshan (New Zealand) J Statham	3	2
4	(India) D Sharan (India) V Vardhan	6	6
(Germany) S Rieschick (Thailand) D Udomchoke	0	3
WC	(Australia) J Peers (Australia) J-P Smith	6	6

Final
4	(India) D Sharan (India) V Vardhan	2	4
WC	(Australia) J Peers (Australia) J-P Smith	6	6
