= 2013 McDonald's Burnie International – Men's singles =

Tennis contest held in Burnie

Men's singles
- 2013 McDonald's Burnie International

Final
- Champion: (Australia) John Millman
- Runner-up: (France) Stéphane Robert
- Score: 6–2, 4–6, 6–0

Events
Singles	men	women
Doubles	men	women
← 2012 ·	Burnie International	· 2014 →

Danai Udomchoke was the defending champion but decided not to participate.
John Millman defeated Stéphane Robert 6–2, 4–6, 6–0 in the final to win the title.

== Seeds ==
1. (Chinese Taipei) Lu Yen-hsun (withdrew, due to a tooth abscess)
2. (Canada) Peter Polansky (quarterfinals)
3. (Australia) John Millman (champion)
4. (Australia) Samuel Groth (second round)
5. (Australia) Brydan Klein (second round)
6. (Australia) James Duckworth (first round)
7. (Italy) Alessandro Giannessi (first round)
8. (Australia) John-Patrick Smith (first round)

== Draw ==
=== Key ===
- Q = Qualifier
- WC = Wild card
- LL = Lucky loser
- Alt = Alternate
- ITF = ITF entry
- PR = Protected ranking
- SR = Special ranking
- SE = Special exempt
- JE = Junior exempt
- JR = Junior Accelerator Programme entrant
- CO = College Accelerator Programme entrant
- NG = Next Gen Accelerator Program entrant
- w/o = Walkover
- r = Retired
- d = Defaulted

=== Finals ===
Semifinals
(New Zealand) Jose Statham	3	2
3	(Australia) John Millman	6	6
(France) Stéphane Robert	7^{7}	7^{7}
(Australia) Matthew Barton	6^{5}	6^{5}

Final
3	(Australia) John Millman	6	4	6
(France) Stéphane Robert	2	6	0

=== Top half ===
First round
LL	(Australia) R Agar	6	2	5
(Canada) É Chvojka	3	6	7
WC	(Australia) J Andrijic	3	4
WC	(Australia) A Whittington	6	6
(Australia) D Propoggia	6	6^{4}	4
(New Zealand) J Statham	4	7^{7}	6
(Australia) G Jones	4	6	6
7	(Italy) A Giannessi	6	3	3
3	(Australia) J Millman	4	6	6
(Australia) B Mitchell	6	2	2
(Russia) Alexander Lobkov	6	3	0
Q	(Australia) J Thompson	3	6	6
Q	(Australia) J Lemke	6	6
(Slovakia) I Klec	1	1
(United Kingdom) J Ward	1	6	6
6	(Australia) J Duckworth	6	3	4

Second round
(Canada) É Chvojka	3	4
WC	(Australia) A Whittington	6	6
(New Zealand) J Statham	6	7^{7}
(Australia) G Jones	4	6^{4}
3	(Australia) J Millman	6	6
Q	(Australia) J Thompson	4	4
Q	(Australia) J Lemke	4	6	6
(United Kingdom) J Ward	6	3	3

Quarterfinals
WC	(Australia) A Whittington	7^{7}	5	1
(New Zealand) J Statham	6^{5}	7	6
3	(Australia) J Millman	7	6
Q	(Australia) J Lemke	5	1

Semifinals
(New Zealand) J Statham	3	2
3	(Australia) J Millman	6	6

=== Bottom half ===
First round
5	(Australia) B Klein	4	7	6
(Italy) L Vanni	6	6	4
(France) S Robert	6	6
Q	(New Zealand) M Venus	3	3
(Australia) A Feeney	6	3	6
WC	(Australia) B Mousley	4	6	2
(France) J Eysseric	3	6^{4}
4	(Australia) S Groth	6	7^{7}
8	(Australia) J-P Smith	2	2
(Australia) M Barton	6	6
(Australia) A Bolt	7^{7}	5	3
(Australia) M Reid	6^{3}	7	6
Q	(Australia) Michael Look	6	6
WC	(Australia) H Bourchier	4	4
(Italy) A Arnaboldi	2	5
2	(Canada) P Polansky	6	7

Second round
5	(Australia) B Klein	2	2
(France) S Robert	6	6
(Australia) A Feeney	6	6
4	(Australia) S Groth	3	1
(Australia) M Barton	5	6	6
(Australia) M Reid	7	3	1
Q	(Australia) M Look	2	6	3
2	(Canada) P Polansky	6	3	6

Quarterfinals
(France) S Robert	3	6	6
(Australia) A Feeney	6	3	2
(Australia) M Barton	2	7^{7}	6
2	(Canada) P Polansky	6	6^{1}	3

Semifinals
(France) S Robert	7^{7}	7^{7}
(Australia) M Barton	6^{5}	6^{5}
