= 2011 McDonald's Burnie International – Men's doubles =

Men's doubles
- 2011 McDonald's Burnie International

Final
- Champions: (Canada) Philip Bester (Canada) Peter Polansky
- Runners-up: (Australia) Marinko Matosevic (New Zealand) Rubin Jose Statham
- Score: 6–4, 3–6, [14–12]

Events
Singles	men	women
Doubles	men	women
← 2010 ·	Burnie International	· 2012 →

Matthew Ebden and Samuel Groth were the defending champions; however, they were defeated 2–6, 6–3, [6–10] by Paolo Lorenzi and Grega Žemlja in the quarterfinals.
Philip Bester and Peter Polansky won the title, defeating Marinko Matosevic and Rubin Jose Statham 6–4, 3–6, [14–12] in the final.

== Seeds ==
1. (Australia) Carsten Ball / (Australia) Chris Guccione (first round)
2. (China) Gong Maoxin / (China) Li Zhe (first round)
3. (Italy) Flavio Cipolla / (Australia) Joseph Sirianni (first round)
4. (Australia) Matthew Ebden / (Australia) Samuel Groth (quarterfinals)

== Draw ==
=== Key ===
- Q = Qualifier
- WC = Wild card
- LL = Lucky loser
- Alt = Alternate
- SE = Special exempt
- PR = Protected ranking
- ITF = ITF entry
- JE = Junior exempt
- w/o = Walkover
- r = Retired
- d = Defaulted
- SR = Special ranking

=== Draw ===
First round
1	(Australia) C Ball (Australia) C Guccione	2	7^{7}	[7]
Alt	(Canada) P Bester (Canada) P Polansky	6	6^{4}	[10]
(Australia) C Ebelthite (Australia) A Feeney	6	4	[5]
(Japan) T Ito (Chinese Taipei) T-h Yang	2	6	[10]
4	(Australia) M Ebden (Australia) S Groth
WC	(Australia) Jared Easton (Australia) Joel Lindner	w/o
(Czech Republic) L Rosol (Thailand) D Udomchoke	4	6^{7}
(Italy) P Lorenzi (Slovenia) G Žemlja	6	7^{9}
WC	(Australia) G Jones (Australia) Nima Roshan	3	6^{6}
(Australia) B Klein (Australia) J Millman	6	7^{8}
WC	(Australia) J Lemke (Australia) D Propoggia	6	7
3	(Italy) F Cipolla (Australia) J Sirianni	2	5
(Australia) S Kadir (Japan) Y Sugita	1	1
(Australia) M Matosevic (New Zealand) J Statham	6	6
(Slovakia) P Červenák (Slovakia) I Klec	5	7^{7}	[12]
2	(China) M Gong (China) Z Li	5	6^{1}	[10]

Quarterfinals
Alt	(Canada) P Bester (Canada) P Polansky	6	6
(Japan) T Ito (Chinese Taipei) T-h Yang	0	4
4	(Australia) M Ebden (Australia) S Groth	2	6	[6]
(Italy) P Lorenzi (Slovenia) G Žemlja	6	3	[10]
(Australia) B Klein (Australia) J Millman	3	2
WC	(Australia) J Lemke (Australia) D Propoggia	6	6
(Australia) M Matosevic (New Zealand) J Statham	6	5	[11]
(Slovakia) P Červenák (Slovakia) I Klec	3	7	[9]

Semifinals
Alt	(Canada) P Bester (Canada) P Polansky	7	6
(Italy) P Lorenzi (Slovenia) G Žemlja	5	4
WC	(Australia) J Lemke (Australia) D Propoggia	1	5
(Australia) M Matosevic (New Zealand) J Statham	6	7

Final
Alt	(Canada) P Bester (Canada) P Polansky	6	3	[14]
(Australia) M Matosevic (New Zealand) J Statham	4	6	[12]
