= 2013 McDonald's Burnie International =

Tennis tournament

- Date: 28 January – 3 February
- Edition: 11th (men); 5th (women)
- Category: ATP Challenger Tour (men); ITF Women's Circuit (women)
- Prize money: $50,000 (men) $25,000 (women)
- Surface: Hard
- Location: Burnie, Australia

Champions

Men's singles
- (Australia) John Millman

Women's singles
- (Australia) Olivia Rogowska

Men's doubles
- (South Africa) Ruan Roelofse / (Australia) John-Patrick Smith

Women's doubles
- (Japan) Shuko Aoyama / (Japan) Erika Sema
← 2012 ·	McDonald's Burnie International	· 2014 →

The 2013 McDonald's Burnie International was a professional tennis tournament played on hard courts. It was the eleventh edition of the tournament which was part of the 2013 ATP Challenger Tour and the 2013 ITF Women's Circuit. It took place in Burnie, Australia, on 28 January – 3 February 2013.

== Men's singles main draw entrants ==
=== Seeds ===
Country	Player	Rank^{1}	Seed
~~TPE~~	~~Lu Yen-hsun~~	~~61~~	~~1~~
CAN	Peter Polansky	183	2
AUS	John Millman	184	3
AUS	Samuel Groth	200	4
AUS	Brydan Klein	217	5
AUS	James Duckworth	223	6
ITA	Alessandro Giannessi	235	7
AUS	John-Patrick Smith	237	8

- ^{1} Rankings as of 14 January 2013

=== Other entrants ===
The following players received wildcards into the singles main draw:

- (Australia) Jay Andrijic
- (Australia) Harry Bourchier
- (Australia) Bradley Mousley
- (Australia) Andrew Whittington

The following players received entry from the qualifying draw:

- (Australia) James Lemke
- (Australia) Michael Look
- (Australia) Jordan Thompson
- (New Zealand) Michael Venus

The following player received entry as a lucky loser:

- (Australia) Ryan Agar

== Men's doubles main draw entrants ==
=== Seeds ===
Country	Player	Country	Player	Rank^{1}	Seed
AUS	Brydan Klein	AUS	Dane Propoggia	246	1
RSA	Ruan Roelofse	AUS	John-Patrick Smith	292	2
AUS	Adam Feeney	NZL	Jose Statham	462	3
CAN	Érik Chvojka	CAN	Peter Polansky	637	4

- ^{1} Rankings as of 14 January 2013

=== Other entrants ===
The following pairs received wildcards into the doubles main draw:

- (Australia) Jay Andrijic / (Australia) Bradley Mousley
- (Australia) Harry Bourchier / (Australia) Omar Jasika
- (Australia) Jacob Grills / (Australia) Andrew Whittington

== Women's singles main draw entrants ==
=== Seeds ===
Country	Player	Rank^{1}	Seed
AUS	Olivia Rogowska	116	1
AUS	Sacha Jones	174	2
RSA	Chanel Simmonds	188	3
JPN	Erika Sema	191	4
AUS	Monique Adamczak	192	5
JPN	Yurika Sema	206	6
LIE	Stephanie Vogt	216	7
CRO	Ana Savić	231	8

- Rankings as of 14 January 2013

=== Other entrants ===
The following players received wildcards into the singles main draw:

- (Italy) Camilla Rosatello
- (Australia) Priscilla Hon
- (Australia) Abbie Myers
- (Australia) Belinda Woolcock

The following players received entry from the qualifying draw:

- (Australia) Azra Hadzic
- (United States) Allie Kiick
- (Estonia) Anett Kontaveit
- (Australia) Jessica Moore
- (Australia) Tammi Patterson
- (Australia) Viktorija Rajicic
- (Japan) Mari Tanaka
- (United Kingdom) Emily Webley-Smith

The following player received entry into the singles main draw as a Lucky Loser:

- (Australia) Stephanie Bengson

== Champions ==
=== Men's singles ===
- (Australia) John Millman def. (France) Stéphane Robert, 6–2, 4–6, 6–0

=== Men's doubles ===
- (South Africa) Ruan Roelofse / (Australia) John-Patrick Smith def. (Australia) Brydan Klein / (Australia) Dane Propoggia 6–2, 6–2

=== Women's singles ===
- (Australia) Olivia Rogowska def. (Australia) Monique Adamczak, 7–6^{(7–5)}, 6–7^{(7–9)}, 6–4

=== Women's doubles ===
- (Japan) Shuko Aoyama / (Japan) Erika Sema def. (Australia) Bojana Bobusic / (Australia) Jessica Moore by walkover
