= 2011 McDonald's Burnie International – Men's singles =

Tennis contest held in Burnie

Men's singles
- 2011 McDonald's Burnie International

Final
- Champion: (Italy) Flavio Cipolla
- Runner-up: (Australia) Chris Guccione
- Score: walkover

Events
Singles	men	women
Doubles	men	women
← 2010 ·	Burnie International	· 2012 →

Bernard Tomic was the defending champion. He reached the semifinals, where he lost 3–6, 7–6^{(7–3)}, 6–7^{(5–7)} to Chris Guccione.
Guccione withdrew before his match against Flavio Cipolla in the final. As a result, Cipolla won the tournament.

== Seeds ==
1. (Australia) Marinko Matosevic (first round)
2. (Italy) Paolo Lorenzi (quarterfinals)
3. (Slovenia) Grega Žemlja (first round)
4. (Australia) Carsten Ball (first round)
5. (Czech Republic) Lukáš Rosol (first round)
6. (Japan) Yuichi Sugita (second round)
7. (Czech Republic) Ivo Minář (first round)
8. (Japan) Tatsuma Ito (semifinals)

== Draw ==
=== Key ===
- Q = Qualifier
- WC = Wild card
- LL = Lucky loser
- Alt = Alternate
- ITF = ITF entry
- PR = Protected ranking
- SR = Special ranking
- SE = Special exempt
- JE = Junior exempt
- JR = Junior Accelerator Programme entrant
- CO = College Accelerator Programme entrant
- NG = Next Gen Accelerator Program entrant
- w/o = Walkover
- r = Retired
- d = Defaulted

=== Finals ===
Semifinals
(Italy) Flavio Cipolla	6	7^{7}
8	(Japan) Tatsuma Ito	4	6^{3}
WC	(Australia) Bernard Tomic	3	7^{7}	6^{5}
WC	(Australia) Chris Guccione	6	6^{3}	7^{7}

Final
(Italy) Flavio Cipolla	w/o
WC	(Australia) Chris Guccione

=== Top half ===
First round
1	(Australia) M Matosevic	2	6	2
(Canada) P Bester	6	4	6
(Australia) J Millman	3	2
(Italy) F Cipolla	6	6
(Germany) Dennis Blömke	6	6^{6}	3
(Slovakia) P Červenák	3	7^{8}	6
Q	(Australia) Joel Lindner	7^{7}	6
7	(Czech Republic) I Minář	6^{2}	4
4	(Australia) C Ball	2	4
(United Kingdom) J Ward	6	6
(Czech Republic) J Hernych	3	6	6
Q	(Australia) J Duckworth	6	4	1
(Canada) P Polansky	6	3	6
(Czech Republic) D Lojda	3	6	4
(Australia) G Jones	4	0
8	(Japan) T Ito	6	6

Second round
(Canada) P Bester	3	4
(Italy) F Cipolla	6	6
(Slovakia) P Červenák	6	3	6
Q	(Australia) J Lindner	2	6	1
(United Kingdom) J Ward	7	4	6
(Czech Republic) J Hernych	5	6	3
(Canada) P Polansky	4	4
8	(Japan) T Ito	6	6

Quarterfinals
(Italy) F Cipolla	6	6
(Slovakia) P Červenák	1	2
(United Kingdom) J Ward	4	4
8	(Japan) T Ito	6	6

Semifinals
(Italy) F Cipolla	6	7^{7}
8	(Japan) T Ito	4	6^{3}

=== Bottom half ===
First round
5	(Czech Republic) L Rosol	4	3
Q	(Canada) É Chvojka	6	6
(Slovakia) I Klec	5	6	3
Q	(Australia) B Mitchell	7	4	6
(Australia) S Groth	4	6^{4}
WC	(Australia) B Tomic	6	7^{7}
(Australia) M Ebden	6	6
3	(Slovenia) G Žemlja	2	3
6	(Japan) Y Sugita	5	6	6
(Thailand) D Udomchoke	7	3	2
WC	(Australia) C Guccione	6	7^{9}
(Australia) B Klein	3	6^{7}
WC	(Australia) J Lemke	7^{7}	4	6
(Chinese Taipei) T-h Yang	6^{4}	6	4
WC	(Australia) L Saville	3	4
2	(Italy) P Lorenzi	6	6

Second round
Q	(Canada) É Chvojka	6	1	4
Q	(Australia) B Mitchell	3	6	6
WC	(Australia) B Tomic	6	7
(Australia) M Ebden	3	5
6	(Japan) Y Sugita	4	3
WC	(Australia) C Guccione	6	6
WC	(Australia) J Lemke	4	2
2	(Italy) P Lorenzi	6	6

Quarterfinals
Q	(Australia) B Mitchell	3	6	4
WC	(Australia) B Tomic	6	3	6
WC	(Australia) C Guccione	6	6
2	(Italy) P Lorenzi	3	3

Semifinals
WC	(Australia) B Tomic	3	7^{7}	6^{5}
WC	(Australia) C Guccione	6	6^{3}	7^{7}
