= 2013 McDonald's Burnie International – Men's doubles =

Men's doubles
- 2013 McDonald's Burnie International

Final
- Champions: (South Africa) Ruan Roelofse (Australia) John-Patrick Smith
- Runners-up: (Australia) Brydan Klein (Australia) Dane Propoggia
- Score: 6–2, 6–2

Events
Singles	men	women
Doubles	men	women
← 2012 ·	Burnie International	· 2014 →

John Peers and John-Patrick Smith were the defending champions but Peers decided not to participate.
Smith played alongside Ruan Roelofse and defended the title by defeating Brydan Klein and Dane Propoggia 6–2, 6–2 in the final.

== Seeds ==
1. (Australia) Brydan Klein / (Australia) Dane Propoggia (final)
2. (South Africa) Ruan Roelofse / (Australia) John-Patrick Smith (champions)
3. (Australia) Adam Feeney / (New Zealand) Jose Statham (semifinals)
4. (Canada) Érik Chvojka / (Canada) Peter Polansky (first round)

== Draw ==
=== Key ===
- Q = Qualifier
- WC = Wild card
- LL = Lucky loser
- Alt = Alternate
- SE = Special exempt
- PR = Protected ranking
- ITF = ITF entry
- JE = Junior exempt
- w/o = Walkover
- r = Retired
- d = Defaulted
- SR = Special ranking

First round
1	(Australia) B Klein (Australia) D Propoggia	6	6
(Australia) M Barton (Australia) J Millman	2	3
(Slovakia) I Klec (Italy) L Vanni	6	6
WC	(Australia) H Bourchier (Australia) O Jasika	3	1
3	(Australia) A Feeney (New Zealand) J Statham	6	6
(Russia) Alexander Lobkov (United Kingdom) J Ward	4	4
(Italy) A Arnaboldi (Italy) A Giannessi	w/o
WC	(Australia) Jacob Grills (Australia) A Whittington
(Australia) J Duckworth (Australia) G Jones	4	4
(Australia) S Groth (Australia) M Reid	6	6
WC	(Australia) J Andrijic (Australia) B Mousley	3	6	[11]
4	(Canada) É Chvojka (Canada) P Polansky	6	3	[9]
(France) J Eysseric (France) S Robert	3	6	[10]
(Australia) A Bolt (Australia) B Mitchell	6	1	[4]
(Australia) Michael Look (New Zealand) M Venus	4	5
2	(South Africa) R Roelofse (Australia) J-P Smith	6	7

Quarterfinals
1	(Australia) B Klein (Australia) D Propoggia	6	6^{4}	[10]
(Slovakia) I Klec (Italy) L Vanni	3	7^{7}	[8]
3	(Australia) A Feeney (New Zealand) J Statham	6	7
(Italy) A Arnaboldi (Italy) A Giannessi	4	5
(Australia) S Groth (Australia) M Reid	6	6
WC	(Australia) J Andrijic (Australia) B Mousley	2	3
(France) J Eysseric (France) S Robert	6^{3}	1
2	(South Africa) R Roelofse (Australia) J-P Smith	7^{7}	6

Semifinals
1	(Australia) B Klein (Australia) D Propoggia	1	7	[10]
3	(Australia) A Feeney (New Zealand) J Statham	6	5	[7]
(Australia) S Groth (Australia) M Reid	4	7^{7}	[6]
2	(South Africa) R Roelofse (Australia) J-P Smith	6	6^{5}	[10]

Final
1	(Australia) B Klein (Australia) D Propoggia	2	2
2	(South Africa) R Roelofse (Australia) J-P Smith	6	6
