= 2011 McDonald's Burnie International =

Tennis tournament

- Date: 31 January – 6 February
- Edition: 9th
- Location: Burnie, Tasmania, Australia

Champions

Men's singles
- (Italy) Flavio Cipolla

Women's singles
- (Canada) Eugenie Bouchard

Men's doubles
- (Canada) Philip Bester / (Canada) Peter Polansky

Women's doubles
- (Japan) Natsumi Hamamura / (Japan) Erika Takao
← 2010 ·	McDonald's Burnie International	· 2012 →

The 2011 McDonald's Burnie International was a professional tennis tournament played on hard courts. It was the ninth edition of the tournament which was part of the 2011 ATP Challenger Tour and ITF Women's Circuit. It took place in Burnie, Tasmania, Australia, between 31 January – 6 February 2011.

== ATP singles main-draw entrants ==
=== Seeds ===
Country	Player	Rank^{1}	Seed
AUS	Marinko Matosevic	138	1
ITA	Paolo Lorenzi	140	2
SVN	Grega Žemlja	142	3
AUS	Carsten Ball	158	4
CZE	Lukáš Rosol	163	5
JPN	Yūichi Sugita	166	6
CZE	Ivo Minář	169	7
JPN	Tatsuma Ito	182	8

- Rankings are as of January 17, 2011.

=== Other entrants ===
The following players received wildcards into the singles main draw:

- (Australia) Chris Guccione
- (Australia) James Lemke
- (Australia) Luke Saville
- (Australia) Bernard Tomic

The following players received entry from the qualifying draw:

- (Canada) Érik Chvojka
- (Australia) James Duckworth
- (Australia) Joel Lindner
- (Australia) Benjamin Mitchell

== WTA singles main-draw entrants ==
=== Seeds ===
Country	Player	Rank^{1}	Seed
AUS	Sally Peers	151	1
RUS	Arina Rodionova	185	2
TUR	Çağla Büyükakçay	190	3
AUS	Jessica Moore	249	4
AUS	Olivia Rogowska	259	5
FRA	Caroline Garcia	275	6
JPN	Chiaki Okadaue	288	7
AUS	Tammi Patterson	300	8

- Rankings are as of January 17, 2011.

=== Other entrants ===
The following players received wildcards into the singles main draw:

- (Australia) Daniella Dominikovic
- (Australia) Azra Hadzic
- (Australia) Alyssa Hibberd
- (Australia) Stefani Stojic

The following players received entry from the qualifying draw:

- (Australia) Bojana Bobusic
- (Canada) Eugenie Bouchard
- (Slovenia) Nastja Kolar
- (Russia) Yulia Putintseva
- (China) Zheng Saisai
- (Australia) Daniela Scivetti
- (Australia) Emelyn Starr
- (Australia) Belinda Woolcock

== Champions ==
=== Men's singles ===
(Italy) Flavio Cipolla def. (Australia) Chris Guccione, walkover

=== Men's doubles ===
(Canada) Philip Bester / (Canada) Peter Polansky def. (Australia) Marinko Matosevic / (New Zealand) Rubin Jose Statham, 6–3, 4–6, [14–12]

=== Women's singles ===
(Canada) Eugenie Bouchard def. (China) Zheng Saisai, 6–4, 6–3

=== Women's doubles ===
(Japan) Natsumi Hamamura / (Japan) Erika Takao def. (Australia) Sally Peers / (Australia) Olivia Rogowska, 6–2, 3–6, 10–7
