= 2012 McDonald's Burnie International – Men's singles =

Men's singles
- 2012 McDonald's Burnie International

Final
- Champion: (Thailand) Danai Udomchoke
- Runner-up: (Australia) Samuel Groth
- Score: 7–6^{(7–5)}, 6–3

Events
Singles	men	women
Doubles	men	women
← 2011 ·	Burnie International	· 2013 →

Flavio Cipolla was the defending champion but chose to compete in PBZ Zagreb Indoors instead.
Danai Udomchoke won the tournament after defeating Samuel Groth 7–6^{(7–5)}, 6–3 in the final.

== Seeds ==
1. (Uzbekistan) Denis Istomin (second round, withdrew with wrist injury)
2. (Chinese Taipei) Lu Yen-hsun (quarterfinals)
3. (Japan) Tatsuma Ito (withdrew)
4. (Chinese Taipei) Yang Tsung-Hua (second round)
5. (Australia) Greg Jones (first round)
6. (Thailand) Danai Udomchoke (champion)
7. (Australia) Marinko Matosevic (first round)
8. (Japan) Yuichi Sugita (semifinals)

== Draw ==
=== Key ===
- Q = Qualifier
- WC = Wild card
- LL = Lucky loser
- Alt = Alternate
- SE = Special exempt
- PR = Protected ranking
- ITF = ITF entry
- JE = Junior exempt
- w/o = Walkover
- r = Retired
- d = Defaulted
- SR = Special ranking

=== Finals ===
Semifinals
WC	(Australia) Samuel Groth	7^{7}	6
8	(Japan) Yuichi Sugita	6^{5}	4
(Chinese Taipei) Jimmy Wang	4	4
6	(Thailand) Danai Udomchoke	6	6

Final
WC	(Australia) Samuel Groth	6^{5}	3
6	(Thailand) Danai Udomchoke	7^{7}	6

=== Top half ===
First round
1	(Uzbekistan) D Istomin	6	6
LL	(New Zealand) J Statham	4	3
WC	(Australia) S Groth	6	6
(Australia) J Lemke	4	3
(South Africa) R Klaasen	0	2
Q	(Australia) A Feeney	6	6
WC	(Australia) J Millman	6	6
5	(Australia) G Jones	4	2
Q	(Australia) C Ebelthite	7	2	5
(Slovakia) K Čapkovič	5	6	7
(Chinese Taipei) T Chen	7	6
(Canada) É Chvojka	5	4
(China) Z Zhang	6	6
(India) V Vardhan	2	4
(Australia) J-P Smith	3	3
8	(Japan) Y Sugita	6	6

Second round
1	(Uzbekistan) D Istomin
WC	(Australia) S Groth	w/o
Q	(Australia) A Feeney	7^{7}	3	2
WC	(Australia) J Millman	6^{2}	6	6
(Slovakia) K Čapkovič	3	5
(Chinese Taipei) T Chen	6	7
(China) Z Zhang	1	6	3
8	(Japan) Y Sugita	6	2	6

Quarterfinals
WC	(Australia) S Groth	7	6
WC	(Australia) J Millman	5	4
(Chinese Taipei) T Chen	6	1	3
8	(Japan) Y Sugita	3	6	6

Semifinals
WC	(Australia) S Groth	7^{7}	6
8	(Japan) Y Sugita	6^{5}	4

=== Bottom half ===
First round
7	(Australia) M Matosevic	4	6	4
(Australia) Michael Look	6	3	6
(Chinese Taipei) J Wang	6	0	6
(Uzbekistan) F Dustov	3	6	4
(Australia) B Mitchell	4	6	6
(Australia) J Duckworth	6	3	4
WC	(Australia) Michael Banes	3	1
4	(Chinese Taipei) T-h Yang	6	6
6	(Thailand) D Udomchoke	7	6
(Ukraine) D Molchanov	6^{6}	1
(Germany) S Rieschick	6	7
(Australia) C Guccione	4	5
Q	(United Kingdom) J Milton	4	5
(Australia) M Reid	6	7
Q	(Australia) Isaac Frost	6^{5}	2
2	(Chinese Taipei) Y-h Lu	7	6

Second round
(Australia) M Look	1	2
(Chinese Taipei) J Wang	6	6
(Australia) B Mitchell	6	6
4	(Chinese Taipei) T-h Yang	4	3
6	(Thailand) D Udomchoke	6	5	6
(Germany) S Rieschick	3	7	1
(Australia) M Reid	2	1
2	(Chinese Taipei) Y-h Lu	6	6

Quarterfinals
(Chinese Taipei) J Wang	6	6
(Australia) B Mitchell	3	0
6	(Thailand) D Udomchoke	7^{7}	7^{7}
2	(Chinese Taipei) Y-h Lu	6^{2}	6^{5}

Semifinals
(Chinese Taipei) J Wang	4	4
6	(Thailand) D Udomchoke	6	6
