= 2012 McDonald's Burnie International =

- Date: 30 January – 5 February 2012
- Edition: 10th (men); 4th (women)
- Category: ATP Challenger Tour (men); ITF Women's Circuit (women)
- Prize money: $50,000 (men) $25,000 (women)
- Location: Burnie, Tasmania, Australia

Champions

Men's singles
- (Thailand) Danai Udomchoke

Women's singles
- (Australia) Olivia Rogowska

Men's doubles
- (Australia) John Peers / (Australia) John-Patrick Smith

Women's doubles
- (Russia) Arina Rodionova / (United Kingdom) Melanie South
← 2011 ·	McDonald's Burnie International	· 2013 →

The 2012 McDonald's Burnie International was a professional tennis tournament played on hard courts. It was the tenth edition of the tournament which is part of the 2012 ATP Challenger Tour and ITF Women's Circuit. It took place in Burnie, Tasmania, Australia between 30 January and 5 February 2012.

== ATP singles main-draw entrants ==
=== Seeds ===
Country	Player	Rank^{1}	Seed
UZB	Denis Istomin	60	1
TPE	Lu Yen-hsun	79	2
~~JPN~~	~~Tatsuma Ito~~	~~117~~	~~3~~
TPE	Yang Tsung-Hua	178	4
AUS	Greg Jones	198	5
THA	Danai Udomchoke	201	6
AUS	Marinko Matosevic	203	7
JPN	Yūichi Sugita	209	8

- Rankings are as of January 16, 2012.

=== Other entrants ===
The following players received wildcards into the singles main draw:

- (Australia) Maverick Banes
- (Australia) Samuel Groth
- (Australia) John Millman
- (Australia) John-Patrick Smith

The following players received entry from the qualifying draw:

- (Australia) Colin Ebelthite
- (Australia) Adam Feeney
- (Australia) Isaac Frost
- (United Kingdom) Joshua Milton

The following players received entry as a Lucky loser:

- (New Zealand) Jose Statham

== Champions ==
=== Men's singles ===
(Thailand) Danai Udomchoke def. (Australia) Samuel Groth, 7–6^{(7–5)}, 6–3

=== Men's doubles ===
(Australia) John Peers / (Australia) John-Patrick Smith def. (India) Divij Sharan / (India) Vishnu Vardhan, 6–2, 6–4

=== Women's singles ===
(Australia) Olivia Rogowska def. (Russia) Irina Khromacheva, 6–3, 6–3

=== Women's doubles ===
(Russia) Arina Rodionova / (United Kingdom) Melanie South def. (Australia) Stephanie Bengson / (Australia) Tyra Calderwood, 6–2, 6–2
