= 2016 Morelos Open =

- Date: 15–21 February
- Edition: 3rd (men); 2nd (women)
- Draw: 32S / 32Q / 16D
- Prize money: $50,000+H (men) $25,000 (women)
- Surface: Hard
- Location: Cuernavaca, Mexico

Champions

Men's singles
- (Austria) Gerald Melzer

Women's singles
- (Czech Republic) Marie Bouzková

Men's doubles
- (Canada) Philip Bester / (Canada) Peter Polansky

Women's doubles
- (Bulgaria) Aleksandrina Naydenova / (Hungary) Fanny Stollár
- Morelos Open

The 2016 Morelos Open was a professional tennis tournament played on outdoor hard courts. It was the third (ATP) and second (ITF) editions of the tournament, which was part of the 2016 ATP Challenger Tour and the 2016 ITF Women's Circuit, offering prize money of $50,000 (ATP) and $25,000 (ITF) on 15–21 February 2016.

== ATP singles main draw entrants ==
=== Seeds ===
Country	Player	Rank^{1}	Seed
DOM	Víctor Estrella Burgos	56	1
ARG	Horacio Zeballos	119	2
AUT	Gerald Melzer	134	3
COL	Alejandro González	156	4
ESP	Adrián Menéndez-Maceiras	160	5
USA	Alexander Sarkissian	182	6
AUT	Dennis Novak	205	7
ESP	Jordi Samper-Montaña	213	8

- ^{1} Rankings as of 8 February 2016.

=== Other entrants ===
The following players received wildcards into the singles main draw:

- (Mexico) Mauricio Astorga
- (Mexico) Lucas Gómez
- (Mexico) Tigre Hank
- (Mexico) Luis Patiño

The following players gained entry into the singles main draw as an alternate:

- (United States) Sekou Bangoura
- (Argentina) Juan Ignacio Londero

The following player gained entry into the singles main draw as a lucky loser:

- (Spain) Gerard Granollers

The following players received entry from the qualifying draw:

- (Colombia) Nicolás Barrientos
- (Ecuador) Gonzalo Escobar
- (Australia) Marinko Matosevic
- (Canada) Peter Polansky

== ITF singles main draw entrants ==
=== Seeds ===
Country	Player	Rank^{1}	Seed
BEL	An-Sophie Mestach	151	1
MEX	Victoria Rodríguez	245	2
VEN	Andrea Gámiz	256	3
NED	Indy de Vroome	259	4
UKR	Elizaveta Ianchuk	274	5
JPN	Ayaka Okuno	288	6
CHN	Xu Shilin	307	7
BUL	Aleksandrina Naydenova	322	8

- ^{1} Rankings as of 8 February 2016.

=== Other entrants ===
The following players received wildcards into the singles main draw:

- (Mexico) Alexia Coutiño Castillo
- (Mexico) Beatriz Magdalena Flores
- (Mexico) Daniela Morales Beckmann
- (Mexico) María José Portillo Ramírez

The following players received entry from the qualifying draw:

- (United States) Nicole Coopersmith
- (Romania) Jaqueline Cristian
- (Ukraine) Elizaveta Ianchuk
- (United States) Madeleine Kobelt
- (Russia) Nika Kukharchuk
- (Russia) Evgeniya Levashova
- (Guatemala) Melissa Morales
- (United States) Zoë Gwen Scandalis

The following player received entry by a lucky loser spot:

- (United States) Shelby Talcott

== Champions ==
=== Men's singles ===
- (Austria) Gerald Melzer def. (Colombia) Alejandro González, 7–6^{(7–4)}, 6–3

=== Women's singles ===
- (Czech Republic) Marie Bouzková def. (United States) Lauren Albanese, 0–6, 6–0, 6–1

=== Men's doubles ===
- (Canada) Philip Bester / (Canada) Peter Polansky def. (El Salvador) Marcelo Arévalo / (Peru) Sergio Galdós, 6–4, 3–6, [10–6]

=== Women's doubles ===
- (Bulgaria) Aleksandrina Naydenova / (Hungary) Fanny Stollár def. (Ukraine) Elizaveta Ianchuk / (Czech Republic) Kateřina Kramperová, 6–3, 6–2
