= Burnie International =

- 2024 Burnie International

Tournament information
- Event name: Burnie International
- Founded: 2002; 24 years ago
- Location: Burnie, Australia
- Venue: Burnie Tennis Club
- Surface: Hard
- Website: Official website
ATP Tour
- Category: ATP Challenger Tour
- Draw: 32S/17Q/16D
- Prize money: $75,000
WTA Tour
- Category: ITF Women's Circuit
- Draw: 32S/32Q/16D
- Prize money: $60,000

The Burnie International is a professional tennis tournament played on outdoor hardcourts. It is currently part of the ATP Challenger Tour and the ITF Women's Circuit. It is a $75k level tournament for the Challenger Tour and a $60,000 level tournament for the Women's Circuit, although it was previously a $25k level tournament before it was upgraded in 2014. It was held annually in Burnie between 2003 and 2015, but didn't take place in 2016 due to a need for court upgrades.

Prior to 2016, the event was also known as the McDonald's Burnie International. From 2017 to 2019 it was known as the Caterpillar Burnie International. While the tournament was planned to be hosted in 2021 and 2022, neither event happened due to the COVID-19 pandemic.

== Past finals ==
=== Men's singles ===
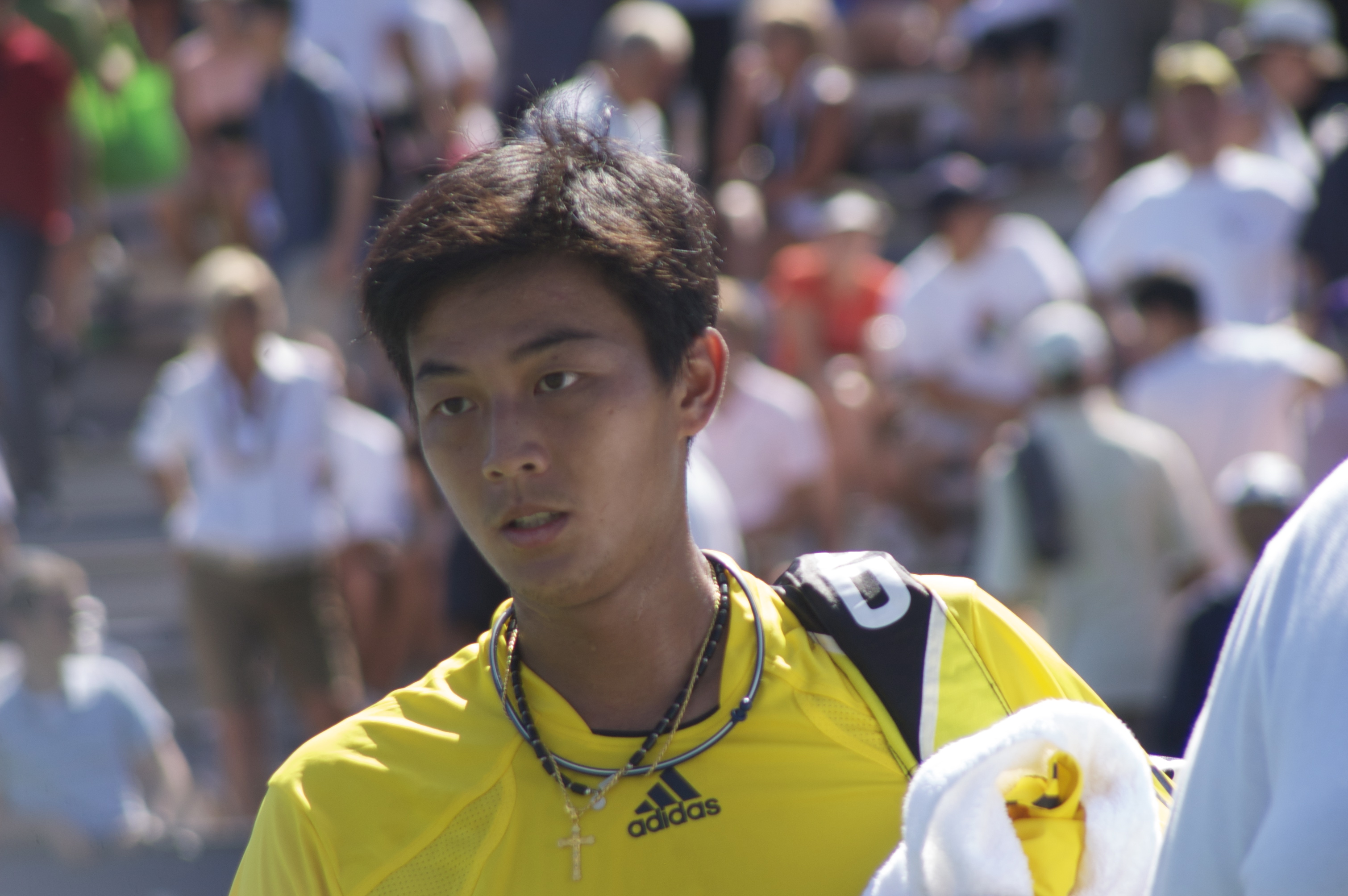
Lu Yen-hsun, competing for Chinese Taipei, won the singles once in 2004, and the doubles twice in 2004 and 2006

Year	Champion	Runner-up	Score
2025	(Australia) Jason Kubler	(Australia) Omar Jasika	6–3, 6–2
2024 (2)	(Australia) Adam Walton	(Australia) Dane Sweeny	6–2, 7–6^{(7–4)}
2024 (1)	(Australia) Omar Jasika	(Australia) Alex Bolt	6–2, 6–7^{(2–7)}, 6–3
2023	(Australia) Rinky Hijikata	(Australia) James Duckworth	6–3, 6–3
2021–2022	Not held		
2020	(Japan) Taro Daniel	(Germany) Yannick Hanfmann	6–2, 6–2
2019	(Canada) Steven Diez	(Australia) Maverick Banes	7–5, 6–1
2018	(France) Stéphane Robert	(Germany) Daniel Altmaier	6–1, 6–2
2017	(Australia) Omar Jasika	(Australia) Blake Mott	6–2, 6–2
2016	Not held		
2015	(South Korea) Chung Hyeon	(Australia) Alex Bolt	6–2, 7–5
2014	(Australia) Matt Reid	(Japan) Hiroki Moriya	6–3, 6-2
2013	(Australia) John Millman	(France) Stéphane Robert	6–2, 4–6, 6–0
2012	(Thailand) Danai Udomchoke	(Australia) Samuel Groth	7–6^{(7–5)}, 6–3
2011	(Italy) Flavio Cipolla	(Australia) Chris Guccione	w/o
2010	(Australia) Bernard Tomic	(Australia) Greg Jones	6–4, 6–2
2009	(Australia) Brydan Klein	(Slovenia) Grega Žemlja	6–3, 6–3
2008	Not held		
2007 (2)	(Australia) Alun Jones	(Australia) Rameez Junaid	6–0, 6–1
2007 (1)	(Australia) Nathan Healey	(Australia) Greg Jones	7–5, 6–4
2006	(Greece) Konstantinos Economidis	(Australia) Alun Jones	6–4, 6–2
2005	(Australia) Chris Guccione	(Japan) Gouichi Motomura	6–3, 7–5
2004 (2)	(Chinese Taipei) Lu Yen-hsun	(Sweden) Robert Lindstedt	6–3, 6–0
2004 (1)	(Greece) Vasilis Mazarakis	(Australia) Andrew Derer	6–3, 6–2
2003 (2)	(Israel) Dudi Sela	(Australia) Paul Baccanello	4–3 ret.
2003 (1)	(Japan) Satoshi Iwabuchi	(Australia) Paul Baccanello	6–2, 6–3
2002	(Australia) Jaymon Crabb	(South Africa) Rik De Voest	6–4, 1–6, 6–3

=== Men's doubles ===
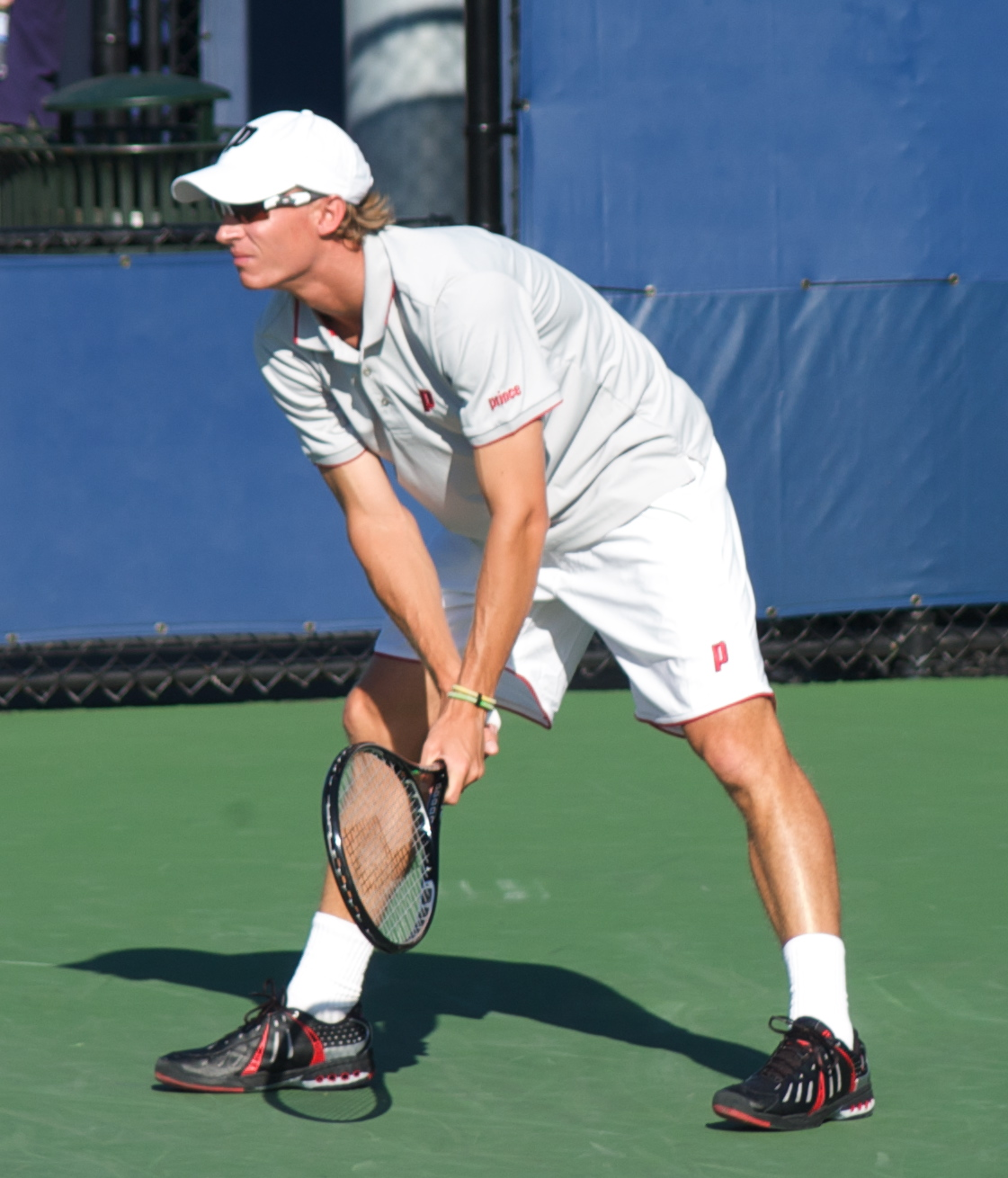
South African Rik de Voest was Lu's partner to the title in doubles in 2004

Year	Champions	Runners-up	Score
2025	(Australia) Matt Hulme (New Zealand) James Watt	(Chinese Taipei) Hsu Yu-hsiou (Chinese Taipei) Huang Tsung-hao	6–2, 6–4
2024 (2)	(Zimbabwe) Benjamin Lock (Japan) Yuta Shimizu	(Australia) Blake Bayldon (Australia) Kody Pearson	6–4, 7–6^{(7–4)}
2024 (1)	(Australia) Alex Bolt (Australia) Luke Saville	(Australia) Tristan Schoolkate (Australia) Adam Walton	5–7, 6–3, [12–10]
2023	(Australia) Marc Polmans (Australia) Max Purcell	(Australia) Luke Saville (Australia) Tristan Schoolkate	7–6^{(7–4)}, 6–4
2021–2022	Not held		
2020	(Finland) Harri Heliövaara (Netherlands) Sem Verbeek	(Switzerland) Luca Margaroli (Italy) Andrea Vavassori	7–6^{(7–5)}, 7–6^{(7–4)}
2019	(South Africa) Lloyd Harris (Israel) Dudi Sela	(Bosnia and Herzegovina) Mirza Bašić (Bosnia and Herzegovina) Tomislav Brkić	6–3, 6–7^{(3–7)}, [10–8]
2018	(Spain) Gerard Granollers (Spain) Marcel Granollers	(United States) Evan King (United States) Max Schnur	7–6^{(10–8)}, 6–2
2017	(United Kingdom) Brydan Klein (Australia) Dane Propoggia	(Australia) Steven de Waard (Australia) Luke Saville	6–3, 6–4
2016	Not held		
2015	(Australia) Carsten Ball (Australia) Matt Reid (2)	(Moldova) Radu Albot (Australia) Matthew Ebden	7–5, 6–4
2014	(Australia) Matt Reid (Australia) John-Patrick Smith (3)	(Japan) Toshihide Matsui (Thailand) Danai Udomchoke	6–4, 6–2
2013	(South Africa) Ruan Roelofse (Australia) John-Patrick Smith (2)	(Australia) Brydan Klein (Australia) Dane Propoggia	6–2, 6–2
2012	(Australia) John Peers (Australia) John-Patrick Smith	(India) Divij Sharan (India) Vishnu Vardhan	6–2, 6–4
2011	(Canada) Philip Bester (Canada) Peter Polansky	(Australia) Marinko Matosevic (New Zealand) Rubin Jose Statham	6–3, 4–6, [14–12]
2010	(Australia) Matthew Ebden (Australia) Samuel Groth (2)	(Australia) James Lemke (Australia) Dane Propoggia	6–7^{(8-10)}, 7–6^{(7-4)}, [10–8]
2009	(Australia) Miles Armstrong (Australia) Sadik Kadir	(Australia) Peter Luczak (Australia) Robert Smeets	6–3, 3–6, [10–7]
2008	Not held		
2007 (2)	(Australia) Samuel Groth (Australia) Joseph Sirianni	(United States) Nima Roshan (New Zealand) Jose Statham	6–3, 1–6, [10–4]
2007 (1)	(Australia) Nathan Healey (Australia) Robert Smeets	(Australia) Rameez Junaid (Australia) Joseph Sirianni	7–6^{(9–7)}, 6–4
2006	(Australia) Luke Bourgeois (2) (Chinese Taipei) Lu Yen-hsun (2)	(Australia) Raphael Durek (Australia) Alun Jones	6–3, 6–2
2005	(Australia) Luke Bourgeois (Australia) Chris Guccione	(Sweden) Alexander Hartman (United States) Scott Lipsky	6–4, 6–3
2004 (2)	(South Africa) Rik de Voest (Chinese Taipei) Lu Yen-hsun	(Italy) Leonardo Azzaro (Austria) Oliver Marach	6–3, 1–6, 7–5
2004 (1)	(Argentina) Juan-Pablo Brzezicki (South Africa) Louis Vosloo	(Australia) Jaymon Crabb (Australia) Peter Luczak	3–6, 6–1, [16–14]
2003 (2)	(Australia) Raphael Durek (Australia) Alun Jones	(Slovenia) Luka Gregorc (Netherlands) Paul Logtens	7–6^{(7–5)}, 6–7^{(4–7)}, [10–7]
2003 (1)	(Argentina) Federico Browne (Netherlands) Rogier Wassen	(Australia) Raphael Durek (Australia) Alun Jones	1–6, 6–3, 6–2
2002	(Australia) Jaymon Crabb (Australia) Joseph Sirianni	(Australia) Paul Baccanello (Australia) Dejan Petrović	2–6, 7–6^{(7–5)}, 6–1

=== Women's singles ===
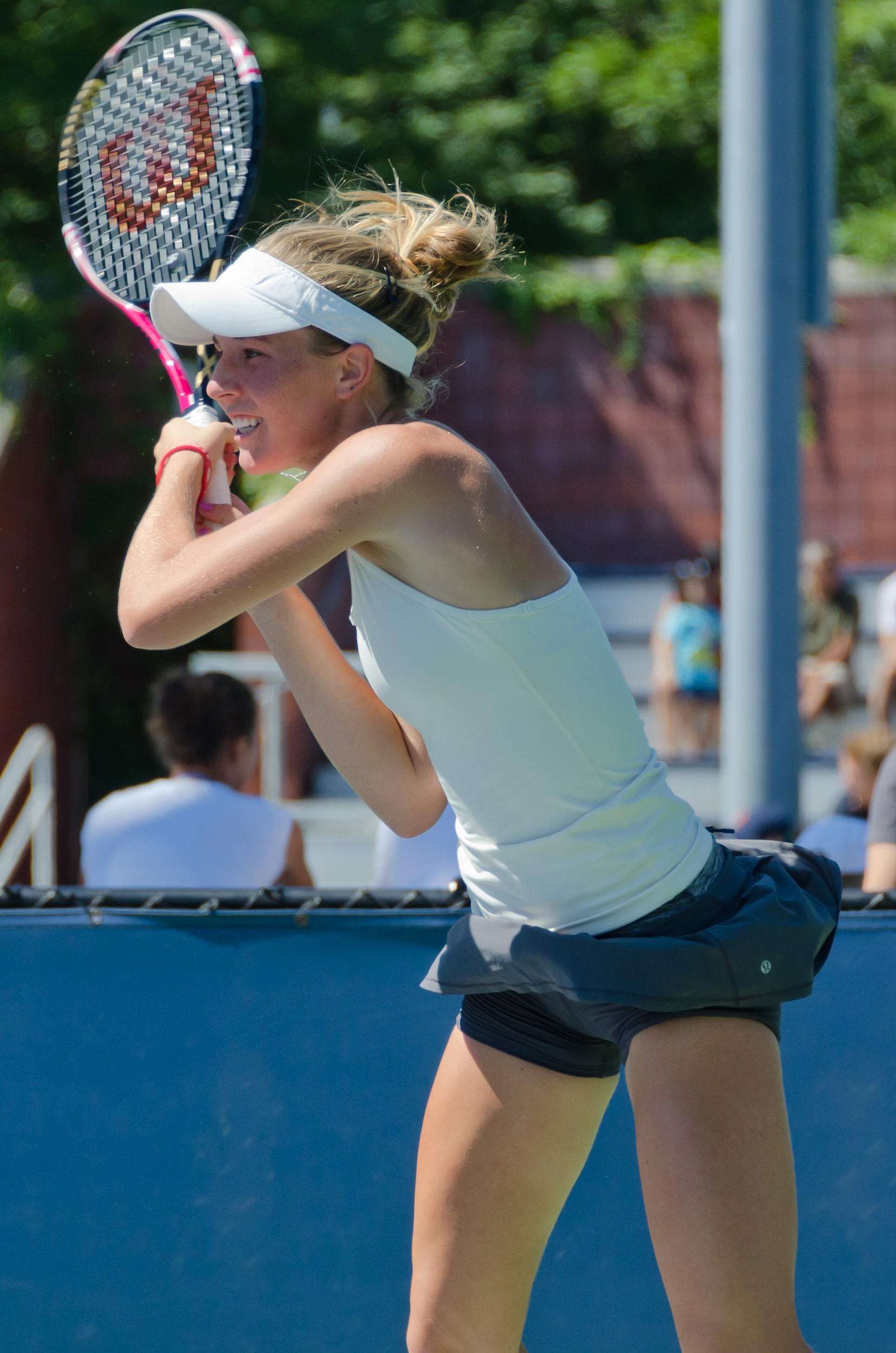
Olivia Rogowska of Australia was the two time singles champion having won the event in 2012 and 2013

Year	Champion	Runner-up	Score
2026	(Australia) Lizette Cabrera	(India) Vaidehi Chaudhari	6–2, 6–3
2025	(France) Tessah Andrianjafitrimo	(China) Guo Hanyu	6–2, 6–3
2024 (2)	(Australia) Maya Joint	(Japan) Aoi Ito	1–6, 6–1, 7–5
2024 (1)	(Australia) Priscilla Hon	(Japan) Sara Saito	6–3, 6–0
2023 (2)	(Australia) Jaimee Fourlis	(Australia) Olivia Gadecki	6–4, 6–3
2023 (1)	(Australia) Storm Hunter	(Australia) Olivia Gadecki	6–4, 6–3
2021–2022	Not held		
2020	(Australia) Maddison Inglis	(United States) Sachia Vickery	2–6, 6–3, 7–5
2019	(Australia) Belinda Woolcock	(Spain) Paula Badosa	7–6^{(7–3)}, 7–6^{(7–4)}
2018	(Ukraine) Marta Kostyuk	(Switzerland) Viktorija Golubic	6–4, 6–3
2017	(United States) Asia Muhammad	(Australia) Arina Rodionova	6–2, 6–1
2016	Not held		
2015	(Russia) Daria Gavrilova	(United States) Irina Falconi	7–5, 7–5
2014	(Japan) Misa Eguchi	(Russia) Elizaveta Kulichkova	4–6, 6–2, 6–3
2013	(Australia) Olivia Rogowska (2)	(Australia) Monique Adamczak	7–6^{(7–5)}, 6–7^{(7–9)}, 6–4
2012	(Australia) Olivia Rogowska	(Russia) Irina Khromacheva	6–3, 6–3
2011	(Canada) Eugenie Bouchard	(China) Zheng Saisai	6–4, 6–3
2010	(Russia) Arina Rodionova	(Australia) Jarmila Groth	6–1, 6–0
2009	(United States) Abigail Spears	(China) Lu Jingjing	6–4, 6–2

=== Women's doubles ===
Year	Champions	Runners-up	Score
2026	(Australia) Gabriella Da Silva-Fick (Australia) Tenika McGiffin	(New Zealand) Monique Barry (Australia) Alexandra Osborne	6–4, 6–3
2025	(New Zealand) Monique Barry (Australia) Elena Micic	(Australia) Gabriella Da Silva-Fick (Australia) Belle Thompson	6–3, 6–4
2024 (2)	(China) Tang Qianhui (China) You Xiaodi	(China) Ma Yexin (Australia) Alana Parnaby	6–4, 7–5
2024 (1)	(New Zealand) Paige Hourigan (New Zealand) Erin Routliffe	(Japan) Kyōka Okamura (Japan) Ayano Shimizu	7–6^{(7–5)}, 6–4
2023 (2)	(Australia) Destanee Aiava (United Kingdom) Naiktha Bains	(Australia) Lily Fairclough (Australia) Olivia Gadecki	6–3, 7–5
2023 (1)	(Japan) Mai Hontama (Japan) Eri Hozumi	(Australia) Arina Rodionova (Japan) Ena Shibahara	4–6, 6–3, [10–6]
2021–2022	Not held		
2020	(Australia) Ellen Perez (Australia) Storm Sanders	(United States) Desirae Krawczyk (United States) Asia Muhammad	6–3, 6–2
2019	(Australia) Ellen Perez (Australia) Arina Rodionova	(Russia) Irina Khromacheva (Belgium) Maryna Zanevska	6–4, 6–3
2018	(United States) Vania King (United Kingdom) Laura Robson	(Japan) Momoko Kobori (Japan) Chihiro Muramatsu	7–6^{(7–3)}, 6–1
2017	(Japan) Riko Sawayanagi (Czech Republic) Barbora Štefková	(Australia) Alison Bai (Thailand) Varatchaya Wongteanchai	7–6^{(8–6)}, 4–6, [10–7]
2016	Not held		
2015	(United States) Irina Falconi (Croatia) Petra Martić	(China) Han Xinyun (Japan) Junri Namigata	6–2, 6–4
2014	(Australia) Jarmila Gajdošová (Australia) Storm Sanders	(Japan) Eri Hozumi (Japan) Miki Miyamura	6–4, 6–4
2013	(Japan) Shuko Aoyama (Japan) Erika Sema	(Australia) Bojana Bobusic (Australia) Jessica Moore	w/o
2012	(Russia) Arina Rodionova (2) (United Kingdom) Melanie South	(Australia) Stephanie Bengson (Australia) Tyra Calderwood	6–2, 6–2
2011	(Japan) Natsumi Hamamura (Japan) Erika Takao	(Australia) Sally Peers (Australia) Olivia Rogowska	6–2, 3–6, [10–7]
2010	(Australia) Jessica Moore (Russia) Arina Rodionova	(Hungary) Tímea Babos (Russia) Anna Arina Marenko	6–2, 6–4
2009	(Australia) Monique Adamczak (United States) Abigail Spears	(China) Xu Yifan (China) Zhou Yimiao	6–2, 6–4
