= 2016 Morelos Open – Men's singles =

Men's singles
- 2016 Morelos Open

Final
- Champion: (Austria) Gerald Melzer
- Runner-up: (Colombia) Alejandro González
- Score: 7–6^{(7–4)} , 6–3

Events
Singles	men	women
Doubles	men	women
- Morelos Open

Víctor Estrella Burgos was the defending champion, but withdrew from the tournament .

Gerald Melzer won the title, defeating Alejandro González in the final 7–6^{(7–4)} , 6–3 .

== Seeds ==
1. (Dominican Republic) Víctor Estrella Burgos (withdrew)
2. (Argentina) Horacio Zeballos (semifinals)
3. (Austria) Gerald Melzer (champion)
4. (Colombia) Alejandro González (final)
5. (Spain) Adrián Menéndez-Maceiras (quarterfinals)
6. (United States) Alexander Sarkissian (quarterfinals)
7. (Austria) Dennis Novak (first round)
8. (Spain) Jordi Samper-Montaña (first round)
9. (Ecuador) Giovanni Lapentti (first round)

== Draw ==
Key

- Q = Qualifier
- WC = Wild card
- LL = Lucky loser
- Alt = Alternate
- ITF = ITF entry
- PR = Protected ranking
- SR = Special ranking
- SE = Special exempt
- JE = Junior exempt
- JR = Junior Accelerator Programme entrant
- CO = College Accelerator Programme entrant
- NG = Next Gen Accelerator Program entrant
- w/o = Walkover
- r = Retired
- d = Defaulted

=== Finals ===
Semifinals
(Italy) Alessandro Giannessi	3	1
4	(Colombia) Alejandro González	6	6
3	(Austria) Gerald Melzer	6^{1}	6	6
2	(Argentina) Horacio Zeballos	7^{7}	3	4

Final
4	(Colombia) Alejandro González	6^{4}	3
3	(Austria) Gerald Melzer	7^{7}	6

=== Top half ===
First round
9	(Ecuador) G Lapentti	7^{10}	5	6^{3}
(Italy) A Giannessi	6^{8}	7	7^{7}
(Barbados) D King	2	3
(Argentina) G Andreozzi	6	6
(Chinese Taipei) J Jung	6	6
Alt	(United States) S Bangoura	3	2
(Spain) R Ramírez Hidalgo	1	6	3
6	(United States) A Sarkissian	6	3	6
4	(Colombia) A González	6	6
WC	(Mexico) L Gómez	2	2
WC	(Mexico) T Hank	3	6^{5}
(Canada) P Bester	6	7^{7}
(Spain) O Roca Batalla	5	6	7
WC	(Mexico) L Patiño	7	3	5
(El Salvador) M Arévalo	4	4
5	(Spain) A Menéndez-Maceiras	6	6

Second round
(Italy) A Giannessi	1	6	7
(Argentina) G Andreozzi	6	4	5
(Chinese Taipei) J Jung	7^{8}	4	5
6	(United States) A Sarkissian	6^{6}	6	7
4	(Colombia) A González	7	7^{7}
(Canada) P Bester	5	6^{2}
(Spain) O Roca Batalla	6^{4}	6	2
5	(Spain) A Menéndez-Maceiras	7^{7}	4	6

Quarterfinals
(Italy) A Giannessi	2	6	6
6	(United States) A Sarkissian	6	1	3
4	(Colombia) A González	6	4	7
5	(Spain) A Menéndez-Maceiras	4	6	5

Semifinals
(Italy) A Giannessi	3	1
4	(Colombia) A González	6	6

=== Bottom half ===
First round
7	(Austria) D Novak	5	0
(Germany) T Kamke	7	6
Q	(Ecuador) G Escobar	7^{7}	6
(United States) Connor Smith	6^{5}	2
(Egypt) M Safwat	3	6	5
(Colombia) E Struvay	6	3	7
LL	(Spain) G Granollers	2	6	1
3	(Austria) G Melzer	6	3	6
8	(Spain) J Samper-Montaña	4	6	3
Q	(Colombia) N Barrientos	6	3	6
(United States) M Krueger	7^{7}	5	6
WC	(Mexico) Mauricio Astorga	6^{0}	7	1
Alt	(Argentina) JI Londero	1	4
Q	(Canada) P Polansky	6	6
Q	(Australia) M Matosevic	4	3
2	(Argentina) H Zeballos	6	6

Second round
(Germany) T Kamke	4	7^{8}	6
Q	(Ecuador) G Escobar	6	6^{6}	0
(Colombia) E Struvay	4	6^{6}
3	(Austria) G Melzer	6	7^{8}
Q	(Colombia) N Barrientos	6	6
(United States) M Krueger	3	4
Q	(Canada) P Polansky	4	6^{4}
2	(Argentina) H Zeballos	6	7^{7}

Quarterfinals
(Germany) T Kamke	6^{5}	3
3	(Austria) G Melzer	7^{7}	6
Q	(Colombia) N Barrientos	3	5
2	(Argentina) H Zeballos	6	7

Semifinals
3	(Austria) G Melzer	6^{1}	6	6
2	(Argentina) H Zeballos	7^{7}	3	4
