= 2016 Morelos Open – Men's doubles =

Men's doubles
- 2016 Morelos Open

Final
- Champions: (Canada) Philip Bester (Canada) Peter Polansky
- Runners-up: (El Salvador) Marcelo Arevalo (Peru) Sergio Galdos
- Score: 6–4 , 3–6 , [10–6]

Events
| Singles | men | women |
| Doubles | men | women |
- Morelos Open

Ruben Gonzales and Darren Walsh are the defending champions, but Gonzales has decided not to participate while Walsh is partnering with Jason Jung . But Walsh and Jung Lost To Marcelo Arevalo and Sergio Galdos in the quarterfinals .

Philip Bester and Peter Polansky won the title, defeating Arevalo and Galdos in the final 6–4, 3–6, [10–6] .

== Seeds ==
1. (Germany) Gero Kretschmer / (Germany) Alexander Satschko (quarterfinals)
2. (India) Purav Raja / (South Africa) Ruan Roelofse (semifinals)
3. (United States) Sekou Bangoura / (South Africa) Dean O'Brien (first round)
4. (El Salvador) Marcelo Arévalo / (Peru) Sergio Galdós (final)

== Draw ==
Key

- Q = Qualifier
- WC = Wild card
- LL = Lucky loser
- Alt = Alternate
- ITF = ITF entry
- PR = Protected ranking
- SR = Special ranking
- SE = Special exempt
- JE = Junior exempt
- JR = Junior Accelerator Programme entrant
- CO = College Accelerator Programme entrant
- NG = Next Gen Accelerator Program entrant
- w/o = Walkover
- r = Retired
- d = Defaulted

First round
1 | (Germany) G Kretschmer (Germany) A Satschko | 6 | 6
(Colombia) A González (Brazil) F Romboli | 4 | 1
WC | (Mexico) L Gómez (Mexico) M Sánchez | 5 | 6^{6}
(Uruguay) A Behar (Mexico) C Ramírez | 7 | 7^{8}
4 | (El Salvador) M Arévalo (Peru) S Galdós | 6 | 6
WC | (Mexico) Mauricio Astorga (Mexico) L Patiño | 3 | 4
WC | (Mexico) D Garza (Mexico) T Hank | 2 | 6 | [12]
(Chinese Taipei) J Jung (United Kingdom) D Walsh | 6 | 4 | [14]
(Canada) P Bester (Canada) P Polansky | 7^{7} | 7
(Austria) G Melzer (Austria) D Novak | 6^{5} | 5
(Venezuela) LD Martínez (Mexico) MÁ Reyes-Varela | 6 | 6
3 | (United States) S Bangoura (South Africa) D O'Brien | 4 | 1
(Mexico) H Hach Verdugo (United States) A Sarkissian | 6 | 6
(Colombia) N Barrientos (Colombia) E Struvay | 3 | 0
(Spain) G Granollers (Spain) A Menéndez-Maceiras | 3 | 5
2 | (India) P Raja (South Africa) R Roelofse | 6 | 7

Quarterfinals
1 | (Germany) G Kretschmer (Germany) A Satschko | 6 | 5 | [3]
(Uruguay) A Behar (Mexico) C Ramírez | 3 | 7 | [10]
4 | (El Salvador) M Arévalo (Peru) S Galdós | 6^{11} | 6 | [10]
(Chinese Taipei) J Jung (United Kingdom) D Walsh | 7^{13} | 4 | [8]
(Canada) P Bester (Canada) P Polansky | 7^{7} | 6
(Venezuela) LD Martínez (Mexico) MÁ Reyes-Varela | 6^{1} | 4
(Mexico) H Hach Verdugo (United States) A Sarkissian | 6^{3} | 4
2 | (India) P Raja (South Africa) R Roelofse | 7^{7} | 6

Semifinals
(Uruguay) A Behar (Mexico) C Ramírez | 5 | 4
4 | (El Salvador) M Arévalo (Peru) S Galdós | 7 | 6
(Canada) P Bester (Canada) P Polansky | 4 | 6 | [10]
2 | (India) P Raja (South Africa) R Roelofse | 6 | 3 | [8]

Final
4 | (El Salvador) M Arévalo (Peru) S Galdós | 4 | 6 | [6]
(Canada) P Bester (Canada) P Polansky | 6 | 3 | [10]
