= Jay Andrijic =

Australian tennis player

- Country (sports): Australia
- Residence: Sydney, Australia
- Born: 3 October 1995 (age 30) Sydney, Australia
- Plays: Right-handed (one–handed backhand)
- Prize money: $700,235

Singles
- Career record: 0–0
- Career titles: 0; 0 [[ATP Challenger Tour}Challenger]], 0 Futures
- Highest ranking: No. 957 (11 November 2013)

Doubles
- Career record: 0–0
- Career titles: 0; 0 [[ATP Challenger Tour}Challenger]], 2 Futures
- Highest ranking: No. 569 (29 July 2013)
- Last updated on: 27 July 2021.

Jay Andrijic (Serbo-Croatian: Andrijić, pronounced [ǎndrijitɕ]; born 3 October 1995) is an Australian tennis player. Andrijic along with Bradley Mousley won the 2013 Australian Open – Boys' doubles title defeating Maximilian Marterer and Lucas Miedler 6–3, 7–6^{(7–3)}.

Andrijic made the ATP top 1000 after reaching the semi-finals of the Australian Futures (F10) in October 2013.

== ATP Challenger and ITF Futures finals ==
=== Doubles: 4 (2–2) ===
Legend ATP Challenger (0–0) ITF Futures (2–2)	Finals by surface Hard (1–1) Clay (1–1) Grass (0–0) Carpet (0–0)

Result	W–L	Date	Tournament	Tier	Surface	Partner	Opponents	Score
Loss	0–1	Sep 2012	Australia F5, Cairns	Futures	Hard	(Australia) Andrew Whittington	(Australia) Adam Feeney (Australia) Nick Lindahl	3–6, 5–7
Win	1–1	Sep 2012	Australia F8, Port Pirie	Futures	Hard	(Australia) Adam Feeney	(Australia) Jack Schipanski (Australia) Alex Bolt	6–2, 6–2
Loss	1–2	May 2013	Spain F13, Lleida	Futures	Clay	(Australia) Bradley Mousley	(Spain) Miguel-Angel Lopez Jaen (Spain) Jordi Marse-Vidri	5–7, 4–6
Win	2–2	May 2013	Spain F14, Valldoreix	Futures	Clay	(Australia) Bradley Mousley	(Spain) Miguel-Angel Lopez Jaen (Spain) Jordi Marse-Vidri	6–3, 6–4

=== Junior Grand Slam finals ===
==== Doubles: 1 (1–0) ====
Result	Year	Championship	Surface	Partner	Opponent	Score
Win	2013	Australian Open	Hard	(Australia) Bradley Mousley	(Germany) Maximilian Marterer (Austria) Lucas Miedler	6–3, 7–6^{(7–3)}
