= 2011 ITF Women's Circuit =

Professional tennis competition

Details
- Duration: 3 January – 30 December

Achievements (singles)

The 2011 ITF Women's Circuit was the 2011 edition of the second-tier tour for women's professional tennis. It was organized by the International Tennis Federation, which was a tier below the WTA Tour. The ITF Women's Circuit at that time included tournaments with prize money ranging from $10,000 up to $100,000.

== Retired players ==
Player	Born	Highest ranking		ITF titles	
Player	Born	Singles	Doubles	Singles	Doubles
(Argentina) Jorgelina Cravero	23 January 1982	106	114	15	34
(Serbia) Ana Jovanović	28 December 1984	216	285	9	1
(Portugal) Magali de Lattre	14 June 1987	334	523	9	4
(Sweden) Hanna Nooni	9 March 1984	152	146	5	3
(Poland) Joanna Sakowicz-Kostecka	1 May 1984	138	312	3	1
(Belgium) Daphne van de Zande	21 July 1974	161	210	4	2

== Statistical information ==
To avoid confusion and double counting, these tables should be updated only after the end of the week.

=== Key ===
$100,000 tournaments
$75,000 tournaments
$50,000 tournaments
$25,000 tournaments
$10,000 tournaments
All titles

=== Titles won by player ===
As of July 11.

Total	Player	$100K		$75K		$50K		$25K		$10K		Total	
Total	Player	S	D	S	D	S	D	S	D	S	D	S	D
13	Casey Dellacqua (AUS)							7	6			1	4
8	Andrea Benítez (ARG)									5	3	5	3
8	Verónica Cepede Royg (PAR)								2	2	4	2	6
7	Varatchaya Wongteanchai (THA)							1	3	2	1	3	4
7	Liang Chen (CHN)								2	1	4	1	6
6	Rika Fujiwara (JPN)					1	2		3			1	5
6	Shuko Aoyama (JPN)						2		4			0	6
5	Iryna Brémond (FRA)					1		2	2			3	2
5	Kristina Mladenovic (FRA)							3	2			3	2
5	Sharon Fichman (CAN)					1	2	1	1			2	3
5	Ani Mijačika (CRO)							1	2	1	1	2	3
5	Adriana Pérez (VEN)								1	2	2	2	3
5	Ekaterina Yashina (RUS)								1	2	2	2	3
5	Rocío de la Torre Sánchez (ESP)									2	3	2	3
5	Simona Dobrá (CZE)									1	4	1	4
5	Daniëlle Harmsen (NED)								2		3	0	5
5	Li Ting (CHN)								2		3	0	5
5	Martina Borecká (CZE)										5	0	5
4	Yulia Putintseva (RUS)					2		2				4	0
4	Aleksandrina Naydenova (BUL)									4		4	0
4	Bibiane Schoofs (NED)							2		1	1	3	1
4	Victoria Larrière (FRA)									3	1	3	1
4	Tímea Babos (HUN)							2	2			2	2
4	Karin Knapp (ITA)							2	1		1	2	2
4	Mihaela Buzărnescu (ROU)							2			2	2	2
4	Scarlett Werner (GER)									2	2	2	2
4	Alexandra Mueller (USA)						3			1		1	3
4	Paula Ormaechea (ARG)								2	1	1	1	3
4	Tamara Čurović (SRB)									1	3	1	3
4	Martina Kubičíková (CZE)									1	3	1	3
4	Marie-Ève Pelletier (CAN)						2		2			0	4
4	Olivia Rogowska (AUS)								4			0	4
4	Karen Castiblanco (COL)								2		2	0	4
4	Laura-Ioana Andrei (ROU)										4	0	4
4	Natalia Kołat (POL)										4	0	4
4	Luciana Sarmenti (ARG)										4	0	4
3	Marina Erakovic (NZL)							3				3	0
3	Marta Sirotkina (RUS)							1		2		3	0
3	Luksika Kumkhum (THA)									3		3	0
3	Alison Van Uytvanck (BEL)									3		3	0
3	Marta Domachowska (POL)							2	1			2	1
3	Réka-Luca Jani (HUN)							1	1	1		2	1
3	Teliana Pereira (BRA)							1	1	1		2	1
3	Ayu-Fani Damayanti (INA)							1		1	1	2	1
3	Cristina Dinu (ROU)									2	1	2	1
3	Ekaterine Gorgodze (GEO)									2	1	2	1
3	Irina Khromacheva (RUS)									2	1	2	1
3	Irina-Camelia Begu (ROU)	1	2									1	2
3	Valeria Savinykh (RUS)	1					1		1			1	2
3	Petra Cetkovská (CZE)		2			1						1	2
3	Nina Bratchikova (RUS)		1				1	1				1	2
3	Anna-Lena Grönefeld (GER)		1					1	1			1	2
3	Sally Peers (AUS)						2	1				1	2
3	Lyudmyla Kichenok (UKR)							1	2			1	2
3	Erika Sema (JPN)							1	2			1	2
3	Kanae Hisami (JPN)								1	1	1	1	2
3	Kateřina Kramperová (CZE)								1	1	1	1	2
3	Maria Fernanda Alves (BRA)									1	2	1	2
3	Anna Fitzpatrick (GBR)									1	2	1	2
3	Anastasia Grymalska (ITA)									1	2	1	2
3	Sofia Kvatsabaia (GEO)									1	2	1	2
3	Jessy Rompies (INA)									1	2	1	2
3	Lisa Sabino (SUI)									1	2	1	2
3	Chan Hao-ching (TPE)						1		2			0	3
3	Diana Enache (ROU)								2		1	0	3
3	Albina Khabibulina (UZB)								1		2	0	3
3	Eugeniya Pashkova (RUS)								1		2	0	3
3	Amra Sadiković (SUI)								1		2	0	3
3	Barbara Sobaszkiewicz (POL)								1		2	0	3
3	Zhao Yijing (CHN)								1		2	0	3
3	Olga Brózda (POL)										3	0	3
3	Benedetta Davato (ITA)										3	0	3
3	Surina De Beer (RSA)										3	0	3
3	Misleydis Díaz González (CUB)										3	0	3
3	Yamile Fors Guerra (CUB)										3	0	3
3	Tereza Hladíková (CZE)										3	0	3
3	Amanda McDowell (USA)										3	0	3
3	Olga Sáez Larra (ESP)										3	0	3
3	Andreea Văideanu (ITA)										3	0	3
3	Eva Wacanno (NED)										3	0	3
2	Pauline Parmentier (FRA)	2										2	0
2	Kimiko Date-Krumm (JPN)	1			1							1	1
2	Lucie Hradecká (CZE)	1				1						2	0
2	Eleni Daniilidou (GRE)			1		1						2	0
2	Melinda Czink (HUN)					2						2	0
2	Petra Rampre (SLO)					2						2	0
2	Lu Jingjing (CHN)					1		1				2	0
2	Patricia Mayr-Achleitner (AUT)					1		1				2	0
2	Monica Puig (PUR)							2				2	0
2	Chanel Simmonds (RSA)							2				2	0
2	Ajla Tomljanović (CRO)							2				2	0
2	Eugenie Bouchard (CAN)							1		1		2	0
2	Jana Čepelová (SVK)							1		1		2	0
2	Misa Eguchi (JPN)							1		1		2	0
2	Dia Evtimova (BUL)							1		1		2	0
2	Akiko Omae (JPN)							1		1		2	0
2	Jasmina Tinjić (BIH)							1		1		2	0
2	Lara Arruabarrena (ESP)									2		2	0
2	Céline Cattaneo (FRA)									2		2	0
2	Yuliana Lizarazo (COL)									2		2	0
2	Garbiñe Muguruza (ESP)									2		2	0
2	Despina Papamichail (GRE)									2		2	0
2	Anna Remondina (ITA)									2		2	0
2	Keren Shlomo (ISR)									2		2	0
2	Anna Tatishvili (GEO)	1	1									1	1
2	Anastasiya Yakimova (BLR)	1							1			1	1
2	Stefanie Vögele (SUI)		1					1				1	1
2	Margalita Chakhnashvili (GEO)						1			1		1	1
2	Irina Buryachok (UKR)							1	1			1	1
2	Florencia Molinero (ARG)							1	1			1	1
2	Chiara Scholl (USA)							1	1			1	1
2	Yurika Sema (JPN)							1	1			1	1
2	Yoo Mi (KOR)							1	1			1	1
2	María Fernanda Álvarez Terán (BOL)								1	1		1	1
2	Quirine Lemoine (NED)								1	1		1	1
2	Alexandra Artamonova (RUS)									1	1	1	1
2	Gioia Barbieri (ITA)									1	1	1	1
2	Tatiana Búa (ARG)									1	1	1	1
2	Lucía Cervera Vázquez (ESP)									1	1	1	1
2	Jorgelina Cravero (ARG)									1	1	1	1
2	Vanesa Furlanetto (ARG)									1	1	1	1
2	Chieh-yu Hsu (USA)									1	1	1	1
2	Yevgeniya Kryvoruchko (UKR)									1	1	1	1
2	Ofri Lankri (ISR)									1	1	1	1
2	Lena Litvak (USA)									1	1	1	1
2	Diāna Marcinkēviča (LAT)									1	1	1	1
2	Evelyn Mayr (ITA)									1	1	1	1
2	Julia Mayr (ITA)									1	1	1	1
2	Valeria Patiuk (ISR)									1	1	1	1
2	Nicole Rottmann (AUT)									1	1	1	1
2	Daniela Seguel (CHI)									1	1	1	1
2	Sandra Zaniewska (POL)									1	1	1	1
2	Sophie Ferguson (AUS)						2					0	2
2	Asia Muhammad (USA)						2					0	2
2	Lenka Wienerová (SVK)						2					0	2
2	Stéphanie Foretz Gacon (FRA)						1		1			0	2
2	Tatjana Malek (GER)						1		1			0	2
2	Valeria Solovyeva (RUS)						1		1			0	2
2	Alyona Sotnikova (UKR)						1		1			0	2
2	Ayumi Oka (JPN)						1				1	0	2
2	Līga Dekmeijere (LAT)								2			0	2
2	Julie Ditty (USA)								2			0	2
2	Natsumi Hamamura (JPN)								2			0	2
2	Han Sung-hee (KOR)								2			0	2
2	María Irigoyen (ARG)								2			0	2
2	Mervana Jugić-Salkić (BIH)								2			0	2
2	Darija Jurak (CRO)								2			0	2
2	Nadiia Kichenok (UKR)								2			0	2
2	Emma Laine (FIN)								2			0	2
2	Karolína Plíšková (CZE)								2			0	2
2	Ahsha Rolle (USA)								2			0	2
2	Remi Tezuka (JPN)								2			0	2
2	Mashona Washington (USA)								2			0	2
2	Maryna Zanevska (UKR)								2			0	2
2	Nigina Abduraimova (UZB)								1		1	0	2
2	Pemra Özgen (TUR)								1		1	0	2
2	Maria Abramović (CRO)										2	0	2
2	Gabriela Cé (BRA)										2	0	2
2	Chan Chin-wei (TPE)										2	0	2
2	Nicole Clerico (ITA)										2	0	2
2	Malou Ejdesgaard (DEN)										2	0	2
2	Eva Fernández Brugués (ESP)										2	0	2
2	Carla Forte (BRA)										2	0	2
2	Giulia Gatto-Monticone (ITA)										2	0	2
2	Irina Glimakova (RUS)										2	0	2
2	Kim Grajdek (GER)										2	0	2
2	Macall Harkins (USA)										2	0	2
2	Ximena Hermoso (MEX)										2	0	2
2	Petra Krejsová (CZE)										2	0	2
2	Kao Shao-yuan (TPE)										2	0	2
2	Kim Hae-sung (KOR)										2	0	2
2	Kim Ju-eun (KOR)										2	0	2
2	Marcella Koek (NED)										2	0	2
2	Tatiana Kotelnikova (RUS)										2	0	2
2	Zuzana Linhová (CZE)										2	0	2
2	Ivette López (MEX)										2	0	2
2	Yuliya Lysa (UKR)										2	0	2
2	Polina Monova (RUS)										2	0	2
2	Nina Munch-Søgaard (NOR)										2	0	2
2	Samantha Murray (GBR)										2	0	2
2	Anja Prislan (SLO)										2	0	2
2	Kyra Shroff (IND)										2	0	2
2	Nicola Slater (GBR)										2	0	2
2	Valentina Sulpizio (ITA)										2	0	2
2	Zsófia Susányi (HUN)										2	0	2
2	Polona Reberšak (SLO)										2	0	2
2	Francesca Stephenson (GBR)										2	0	2
2	Tian Ran (CHN)										2	0	2
2	Jade Windley (GBR)										2	0	2
2	Karolina Wlodarczak (AUS)										2	0	2
2	Grace Sari Ysidora (INA)										2	0	2
1	Elena Baltacha (GBR)	1										1	0
1	Sorana Cîrstea (ROU)	1										1	0
1	Magdaléna Rybáriková (SVK)	1										1	0
1	Stéphanie Dubois (CAN)					1						1	0
1	Edina Gallovits-Hall (ROU)					1						1	0
1	Camila Giorgi (ITA)					1						1	0
1	Sachie Ishizu (JPN)					1						1	0
1	Christina McHale (USA)					1						1	0
1	Anastasia Pivovarova (RUS)					1						1	0
1	Sloane Stephens (USA)					1						1	0
1	Tamarine Tanasugarn (THA)					1						1	0
1	Mona Barthel (GER)							1				1	0
1	Séverine Beltrame (FRA)							1				1	0
1	Madison Brengle (USA)							1				1	0
1	Claire de Gubernatis (FRA)							1				1	0
1	Nikola Hofmanova (AUT)							1				1	0
1	Isabella Holland (AUS)							1				1	0
1	Hsieh Su-wei (TPE)							1				1	0
1	Kim So-jung (KOR)							1				1	0
1	Nastja Kolar (SLO)							1				1	0
1	Michelle Larcher de Brito (POR)							1				1	0
1	Tadeja Majerič (SLO)							1				1	0
1	Nathalie Piquion (FRA)							1				1	0
1	Olga Puchkova (RUS)							1				1	0
1	Ana Sofía Sánchez (MEX)							1				1	0
1	Laura Siegemund (GER)							1				1	0
1	Lina Stančiūtė (LTU)							1				1	0
1	María Teresa Torró Flor (ESP)							1				1	0
1	Roxane Vaisemberg (BRA)							1				1	0
1	Galina Voskoboeva (KAZ)							1				1	0
1	Ashley Weinhold (USA)							1				1	0
1	Zhang Ling (HKG)							1				1	0
1	Indire Akiki (CRO)									1		1	0
1	Robin Anderson (USA)									1		1	0
1	Sharmada Balu (IND)									1		1	0
1	Karen Barbat (DEN)									1		1	0
1	Prena Bhambri (IND)									1		1	0
1	Gail Brodsky (USA)									1		1	0
1	Yana Buchina (RUS)									1		1	0
1	Ema Burgić (BIH)									1		1	0
1	Nastassya Burnett (ITA)									1		1	0
1	Estrella Cabeza Candela (ESP)									1		1	0
1	Myriam Casanova (SUI)									1		1	0
1	Elora Dabija (ROU)									1		1	0
1	Lauren Davis (USA)									1		1	0
1	Magali de Lattre (POR)									1		1	0
1	Eleanor Dean (GBR)									1		1	0
1	Vlada Ekshibarova (UZB)									1		1	0
1	Daria Gavrilova (RUS)									1		1	0
1	Viktorija Golubic (SUI)									1		1	0
1	Nadezda Gorbachkova (RUS)									1		1	0
1	Sarah Gronert (GER)									1		1	0
1	Sandy Gumulya (INA)									1		1	0
1	Michaela Hončová (SVK)									1		1	0
1	Elizaveta Ianchuk (UKR)									1		1	0
1	Miharu Imanishi (JPN)									1		1	0
1	Jovana Jakšić (SRB)									1		1	0
1	Ana Jovanović (SRB)									1		1	0
1	Juan Ting-fei (TPE)									1		1	0
1	Lesley Kerkhove (NED)									1		1	0
1	Iris Khanna (AUT)									1		1	0
1	Alexis King (USA)									1		1	0
1	Anett Kontaveit (EST)									1		1	0
1	Natalija Kostić (SRB)									1		1	0
1	Anna Korzeniak (POL)									1		1	0
1	Danka Kovinić (MNE)									1		1	0
1	Makiho Kozawa (JPN)									1		1	0
1	Kyle McPhilipps (USA)									1		1	0
1	Catalina Pella (ARG)									1		1	0
1	Carolina Pillot (ITA)									1		1	0
1	Daria Salnikova (RUS)									1		1	0
1	Olivia Sanchez (FRA)									1		1	0
1	Anne Schäfer (GER)									1		1	0
1	Noel Scott (USA)									1		1	0
1	Melis Sezer (TUR)									1		1	0
1	Christina Shakovets (GER)									1		1	0
1	Sandra Soler-Sola (ESP)									1		1	0
1	Jasmin Steinherr (GER)									1		1	0
1	Romana Tabak (SVK)									1		1	0
1	Mari Tanaka (JPN)									1		1	0
1	Polina Vinogradova (RUS)									1		1	0
1	Carina Witthöft (GER)									1		1	0
1	Yang Zhaoxuan (CHN)									1		1	0
1	Nina Zander (GER)									1		1	0
1	Zuzana Zlochová (SVK)									1		1	0
1	Zhu Lin (CHN)									1		1	0
1	Agnese Zucchini (ITA)									1		1	0
1	Eva Birnerová (CZE)		1									0	1
1	Elena Bogdan (ROU)		1									0	1
1	Natalie Grandin (RSA)		1									0	1
1	Jamie Hampton (USA)		1									0	1
1	Michaëlla Krajicek (NED)		1									0	1
1	Petra Martić (CRO)		1									0	1
1	Mandy Minella (LUX)		1									0	1
1	Alexandra Panova (RUS)		1									0	1
1	Urszula Radwańska (POL)		1									0	1
1	Vladimíra Uhlířová (CZE)		1									0	1
1	Zhang Shuai (CHN)				1							0	1
1	Yuliya Beygelzimer (UKR)						1					0	1
1	Elena Bovina (RUS)						1					0	1
1	Chan Yung-jan (TPE)						1					0	1
1	Caroline Garcia (FRA)						1					0	1
1	Darya Kustova (BLR)						1					0	1
1	Irena Pavlovic (FRA)						1					0	1
1	Liu Wanting (CHN)						1					0	1
1	Tetiana Luzhanska (UKR)						1					0	1
1	Arina Rodionova (RUS)						1					0	1
1	Sun Shengnan (CHN)						1					0	1
1	Aurélie Védy (FRA)						1					0	1
1	Akiko Yonemura (JPN)						1					0	1
1	Monique Albuquerque (BRA)								1			0	1
1	Tetyana Arefyeva (UKR)								1			0	1
1	Mailen Auroux (ARG)								1			0	1
1	Naomi Broady (GBR)								1			0	1
1	Alexandra Cadanţu (ROU)								1			0	1
1	Rushmi Chakravarthi (IND)								1			0	1
1	Stéphanie Cohen-Aloro (FRA)								1			0	1
1	Kimberly Couts (USA)								1			0	1
1	Christina Fusano (USA)								1			0	1
1	Alexa Glatch (USA)								1			0	1
1	Paula Cristina Gonçalves (BRA)								1			0	1
1	Nadejda Guskova (RUS)								1			0	1
1	Fernanda Hermenegildo (BRA)								1			0	1
1	Hong Hyun-hui (KOR)								1			0	1
1	Eva Hrdinová (CZE)								1			0	1
1	Valentyna Ivakhnenko (UKR)								1			0	1
1	Ekaterina Ivanova (RUS)								1			0	1
1	Veronika Kapshay (UKR)								1			0	1
1	Kim Ji-young (KOR)								1			0	1
1	Sandra Klemenschits (AUT)								1			0	1
1	Johanna Konta (AUS)								1			0	1
1	Elitsa Kostova (BUL)								1			0	1
1	Kateryna Kozlova (UKR)								1			0	1
1	Anne Kremer (LUX)								1			0	1
1	Anaïs Laurendon (FRA)								1			0	1
1	Yvonne Meusburger (AUT)								1			0	1
1	Teodora Mirčić (SRB)								1			0	1
1	Katarzyna Piter (POL)								1			0	1
1	Kristýna Plíšková (CZE)								1			0	1
1	Arantxa Rus (NED)								1			0	1
1	Aranza Salut (ARG)								1			0	1
1	Selima Sfar (TUN)								1			0	1
1	Melanie South (GBR)								1			0	1
1	Erika Takao (JPN)								1			0	1
1	Poojashree Venkatesha (IND)								1			0	1
1	Lisa Whybourn (GBR)								1			0	1
1	Kathrin Wörle (GER)								1			0	1
1	Zheng Saisai (CHN)								1			0	1
1	Aishwarya Agrawal (IND)										1	0	1
1	Jennifer Allan (GBR)										1	0	1
1	Ani Amiraghyan (ARM)										1	0	1
1	Shiori Araki (JPN)										1	0	1
1	Aselya Arginbayeva (KAZ)										1	0	1
1	Brooke Austin (USA)										1	0	1
1	Carolina Betancourt (MEX)										1	0	1
1	Bojana Bobusic (AUS)										1	0	1
1	Brooke Bolender (USA)										1	0	1
1	Amy Bowtell (IRL)										1	0	1
1	Lucy Brown (GBR)										1	0	1
1	Yera Campos Molina (ESP)										1	0	1
1	Amanda Carreras (GBR)										1	0	1
1	Catalina Castaño (COL)										1	0	1
1	Yasmin Clarke (GBR)										1	0	1
1	Cecilia Costa Melgar (CHI)										1	0	1
1	Leticia Costas (ESP)										1	0	1
1	Ana Paula de la Peña (MEX)										1	0	1
1	Florencia di Biasi (ARG)										1	0	1
1	Weronika Domagała (POL)										1	0	1
1	Ulrikke Eikeri (NOR)										1	0	1
1	Arabela Fernández Rabener (ESP)										1	0	1
1	Inés Ferrer Suárez (ESP)										1	0	1
1	Nikola Fraňková (CZE)										1	0	1
1	Andrea Gámiz (VEN)										1	0	1
1	Martina Gledacheva (BUL)										1	0	1
1	Flávia Guimarães Bueno (BRA)										1	0	1
1	Han Na-lae (KOR)										1	0	1
1	Risa Hasegawa (JPN)										1	0	1
1	Vanessa Henke (GER)										1	0	1
1	Yuka Higuchi (JPN)										1	0	1
1	Alexandra Hirsch (USA)										1	0	1
1	Dianne Hollands (NZL)										1	0	1
1	Camelia Hristea (ROU)										1	0	1
1	Alenka Hubacek (AUS)										1	0	1
1	Mari Inoue (JPN)										1	0	1
1	Dalila Jakupović (SLO)										1	0	1
1	Betina Jozami (ARG)										1	0	1
1	Vivien Juhászová (SVK)										1	0	1
1	Paula Kania (POL)										1	0	1
1	Moe Kawatoko (JPN)										1	0	1
1	Kim Kilsdonk (NED)										1	0	1
1	Xenia Knoll (SUI)										1	0	1
1	Mateja Kraljevic (SUI)										1	0	1
1	Ilona Kremen (BLR)										1	0	1
1	Margarita Lazareva (RUS)										1	0	1
1	Lee So-ra (KOR)										1	0	1
1	Zuzana Luknárová (SVK)										1	0	1
1	Elizabeth Lumpkin (USA)										1	0	1
1	Marina Melnikova (RUS)										1	0	1
1	Danielle Mills (USA)										1	0	1
1	Miki Miyamura (JPN)										1	0	1
1	Dessislava Mladenova (BUL)										1	0	1
1	Maria Mokh (RUS)										1	0	1
1	Anastasia Mukhametova (RUS)										1	0	1
1	Emi Mutaguchi (JPN)										1	0	1
1	Viky Núñez Fuentes (COL)										1	0	1
1	Eduarda Piai (BRA)										1	0	1
1	Raquel Piltcher (BRA)										1	0	1
1	Anastasiya Prenko (TKM)										1	0	1
1	Federica Quercia (ITA)										1	0	1
1	Alice-Andrada Radu (ROU)										1	0	1
1	Ingrid Radu (ROU)										1	0	1
1	Ankita Raina (IND)										1	0	1
1	Kayla Rizzolo (USA)										1	0	1
1	Jessica Roland-Rosario (PUR)										1	0	1
1	Nathália Rossi (BRA)										1	0	1
1	Salome Llaguno (ARG)										1	0	1
1	Alejandra Sala Juste (ESP)										1	0	1
1	Tanja Samodelok (RUS)										1	0	1
1	Lynn Schönhage (NED)										1	0	1
1	Demi Schuurs (NED)										1	0	1
1	Isabella Shinikova (BUL)										1	0	1
1	Karina Souza (BRA)										1	0	1
1	Kotomi Takahata (JPN)										1	0	1
1	Lavinia Tananta (INA)										1	0	1
1	Romana Tedjakusuma (INA)										1	0	1
1	Monika Tůmová (CZE)										1	0	1
1	Shikha Uberoi (IND)										1	0	1
1	Ghislaine van Baal (NED)										1	0	1
1	Nicolette van Uitert (NED)										1	0	1
1	Ingrid Várgas Calvo (PER)										1	0	1
1	Hirono Watanabe (JPN)										1	0	1
1	Varunya Wongteanchai (THA)										1	0	1
1	Ai Yamamoto (JPN)										1	0	1
1	Sylwia Zagórska (POL)										1	0	1
1	Anna Zaja (GER)										1	0	1
1	Zhang Kailin (CHN)										1	0	1
1	Zheng Junyi (CHN)										1	0	1

=== Titles won by nation ===
Total	Nation	$100K		$75K		$50K		$25K		$10K		Total	
Total	Nation	S	D	S	D	S	D	S	D	S	D	S	D
40	Russia (RUS)	1	2			1	4	4	5	12	11	18	22
34	United States (USA)		1			2	3	3	7	9	9	14	20
34	Japan (JPN)	1			1	2	3	4	10	6	7	13	21
27	France (FRA)	2				1	3	7	6	6	2	16	11
27	Argentina (ARG)							1	6	10	10	11	16
26	Italy (ITA)					1		2	1	9	13	12	14
23	Czech Republic (CZE)	1	3			2			2	3	12	6	17
21	Romania (ROU)	2	2			1		2	2	4	8	9	12'
19	Germany (GER)		1				1	3	2	7	5	10	9
19	China (CHN)				1	1	1	1	5	3	7	5	14
19	Ukraine (UKR)						3	2	9	2	3	4	15
18	Spain (ESP)							1		9	8	10	8
18	Netherlands (NED)							2	4	3	9	5	13
16	Brazil (BRA)							2	4	2	8	4	12
15	Croatia (CRO)		1					3	4	4	3	7	8
15	Poland (POL)		1					2	3	2	7	4	11
15	Great Britain (GBR)	1							2	2	10	3	12
14	Australia (AUS)						2	3	5		4	3	11
11	Hungary (HUN)					2		3	3	1	2	6	5
11	Thailand (THA)					1		1	3	5	1	7	4
11	Switzerland (SUI)		1					1	1	3	5	4	7
10	Slovakia (SVK)	1					2	1		4	2	6	4
10	Bulgaria (BUL)							1	1	5	3	6	4
10	Georgia (GEO)	1	1				1			4	3	5	5
9	Canada (CAN)					2	2	2	2	1		5	4
9	Slovenia (SLO)					2		2			5	4	5
8	Austria (AUT)					1		2	2	2	1	5	3
8	Indonesia (INA)							1		3	4	4	4
8	Serbia (SRB)								1	4	3	4	4
8	South Korea (KOR)							2	3		3	2	6
8	Paraguay (PAR)								2	2	4	2	6
7	Chinese Taipei (TPE)						1	2	1	1	2	2	5
7	India (IND)								1	2	4	2	5
7	Colombia (COL)								2	2	3	2	5
6	Belarus (BLR)	1					1	1	2		1	2	4
6	South Africa (RSA)		1					2			3	2	4
6	Venezuela (VEN)								1	2	3	2	4
5	Israel (ISR)									4	1	4	1
5	Mexico (MEX)									1	4	1	4
4	Greece (GRE)			1		1				2		4	0
4	New Zealand (NZL)							3			1	3	1
4	Uzbekistan (UZB)							1	1		2	1	3
4	Latvia (LAT)								2	1	1	1	3
4	Turkey (TUR)								1	1	2	1	3
3	Belgium (BEL)									3		3	0
3	Puerto Rico (PUR)							2			1	2	1
3	Bosnia and Herzegovina (BIH)								2	1		1	2
3	Chile (CHI)									1	2	1	2
3	Denmark (DEN)									1	2	1	2
3	Cuba (CUB)										3	0	3
3	Norway (NOR)										3	0	3
2	Portugal (POR)							1		1		2	0
2	Kazakhstan (KAZ)							1			1	1	1
2	Bolivia (BOL)								1	1		1	1
2	Luxembourg (LUX)		1						1			0	2
2	Finland (FIN)								2			0	2
1	Hong Kong (HKG)							1				1	0
1	Lithuania (LTU)							1				1	0
1	Estonia (EST)									1		1	0
1	Montenegro (MNE)									1		1	0
1	Tunisia (TUN)								1			0	1
1	Armenia (ARM)										1	0	1
1	Ireland (IRL)										1	0	1
1	Peru (PER)										1	0	1
1	Turkmenistan (TKM)										1	0	1

- Iryna Brémond (née Kuryanovich) started representing France in March, but won two titles while representing Belarus.
- Jasmina Tinjić started representing Bosnia & Herzegovina in April, but won two titles while representing Croatia.

== Ranking distribution ==
Description	W	F	SF	QF	R16	R32	QLFR	Q3	Q2	Q1
ITF $100,000 + H(S)	150	110	80	40	20	1	6	4	1	–
ITF $100,000 + H(D)	150	110	80	40	1	–	–	–	–	–
ITF $100,000 (S)	140	100	70	36	18	1	6	4	1	–
ITF $100,000 (D)	140	100	70	36	1	–	–	–	–	–
ITF $75,000 + H(S)	130	90	58	32	16	1	6	4	1	–
ITF $75,000 + H(D)	130	90	58	32	1	–	–	–	–	–
ITF $75,000 (S)	110	78	50	30	14	1	6	4	1	–
ITF $75,000 (D)	110	78	50	30	1	–	–	–	–	–
ITF $50,000 + H(S)	90	64	40	24	12	1	6	4	1	–
ITF $50,000 + H(D)	90	64	40	24	1	–	–	–	–	–
ITF $50,000 (S)	70	50	32	18	10	1	6	4	1	–
ITF $50,000 (D)	70	50	32	18	1	–	–	–	–	–
ITF $25,000 (S)	50	34	24	14	8	1	1	–	–	–
ITF $25,000 (D)	50	34	24	14	1	–	–	–	–	–
ITF $15,000 (S)	20	15	11	8	1	–	–	–	–	–
ITF $15,000 (D)	20	15	11	1	0	–	–	–	–	–
ITF $10,000 (S)	12	8	6	4	1	–	–	–	–	–
ITF $10,000 (D)	12	8	6	1	0	–	–	–	–	–

"+H" indicates that Hospitality is provided.
