= Philip Bester =

Canadian tennis player (born 1988)

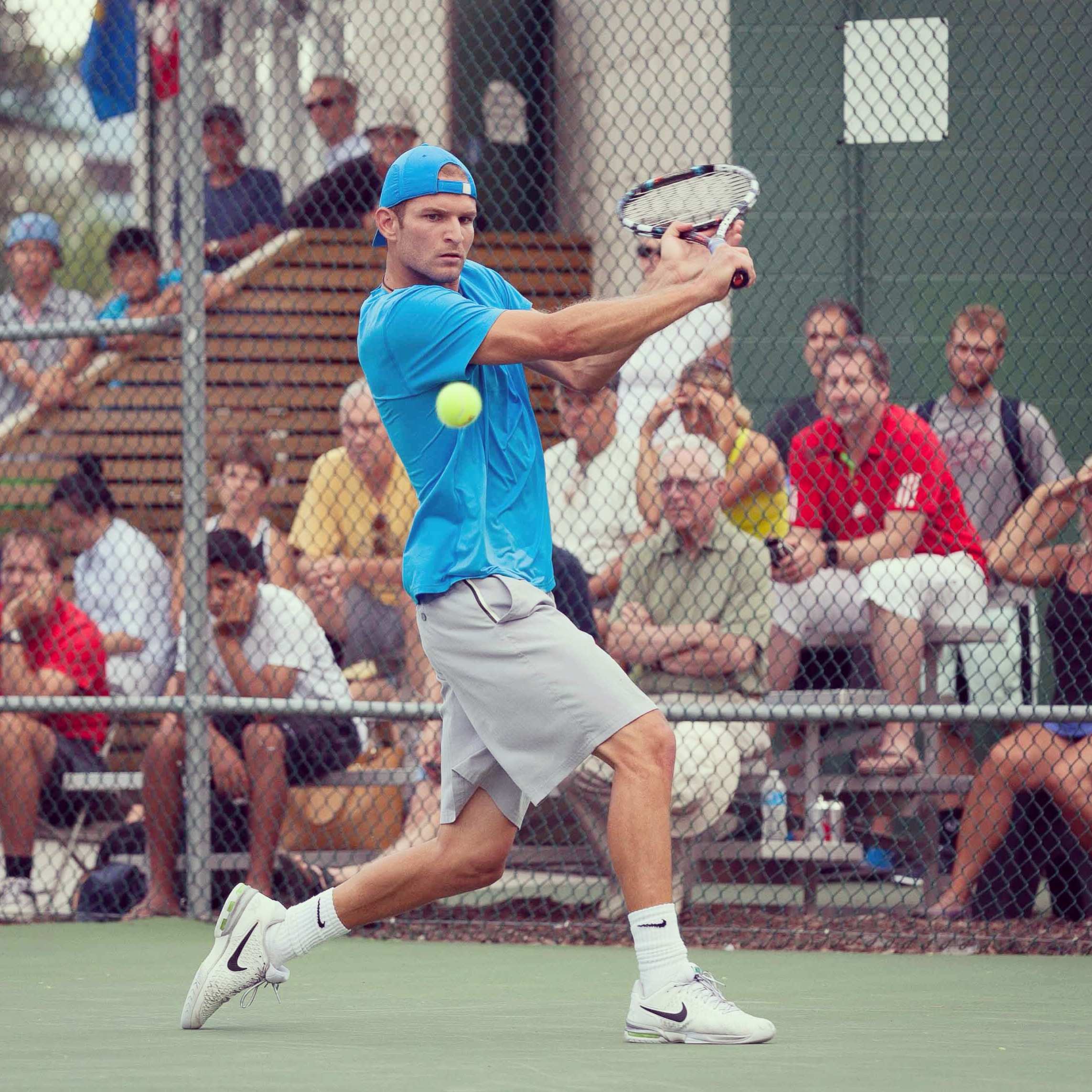
- Country (sports): Canada
- Residence: North Vancouver, British Columbia, Canada
- Born: October 6, 1988 (age 37) Sonthofen, West Germany
- Height: 1.88 m (6.2 ft)
- Turned pro: 2006
- Retired: August 2017
- Plays: Right-handed (one-handed backhand)
- Prize money: US$272,057

Singles
- Career record: 2–8
- Career titles: 0
- Highest ranking: No. 225 (July 27, 2015)

Grand Slam singles results
- Australian Open: Q1 (2011)
- US Open: Q1 (2015)

Doubles
- Career record: 1–8
- Career titles: 0
- Highest ranking: No. 140 (October 3, 2016)

Team competitions
- Davis Cup: 1R (2016)
Medal record
Representing Canada
Men's tennis
Pan American Games
Silver medal – second place	2015 Toronto	Mixed Doubles

Philip Bester (born October 6, 1988) is a Canadian former professional tennis player and current coach from North Vancouver, British Columbia, Canada. Bester was a finalist at the 2006 junior French Open. In doing so he became the first Canadian male to reach a Grand Slam final in singles.

== As a junior ==
Bester was coached by his dad Alek Bester from age 5 when he started. Alek, a long time P.E. teacher at York House School in Vancouver, was the core of Philip's physical and tennis development till around the age of 16. Rufus Nel a high performance coach from South Africa was also a big part of Philip's early development, contributing his tennis knowledge and expertise on the game of tennis. At age 13, still coached by his dad, Philip moved down to Florida to attend the Nick Bollettieri Tennis Academy. There he spent 4 years, before teaming up with Jon Sorbo for the 2006 year. He was a member of the 2005 Canadian Davis Cup team as a 17-year-old. He was also voted British Columbia's junior male athlete of the year for 2005 and reached a career-high No. 8 on the International Tennis Federation Junior Boys rankings on January 2, 2006.

Bester's best junior result was in the Boys' singles section of the 2006 French Open. He had a remarkable run for a natural serve-and-volleyer in becoming the first Canadian male junior to play in a Grand Slam final. (Later that year at the U.S. Open, Peter Polansky duplicated the feat.) Bester lost his final to Martin Kližan, 3–6, 1–6.

== On the professional tour ==
=== 2004, 2005 ===
While still a junior, Bester competed in Canada F1 and F2 Futures tournaments in 2004, losing handily in the first round of each. In 2005, he won he first tour match 6–2, 6–4, over compatriot Rob Steckley, in the Granby Challenger. He lost convincingly in the first round of the Vancouver Challenger and Canada Masters tournaments during the same summer before reaching the semi-finals of Canada F1 in Toronto in October.

=== 2006 ===
In 2006, Bester competed in Canada's tie versus Mexico, losing a singles dead rubber in straight sets to Bruno Echagaray. He followed this up with a semi-finals result at U.S.A. F9 in Vero Beach. In July he won his first Davis Cup match, in a live rubber over Jhonnatan Medina-Álvarez of Venezuela, as Canada prevailed to remain in the America Group 1 pool. Competing in a total of 7 Futures and 3 Challenger events for the year, Bester reached a high rank of World No. 670, in November.

=== 2007 ===
Bester began the year going 1 win and 1 loss at both Panama F1 and Costa Rica F1. He lost in the first round of his next two Futures events before again going 1 and 1 at this next two, Canada F2 and F3. Bester next reached the semi-finals of U.S.A. F7, and the quarter-finals of U.S.A. F8. He reached a new career high ranking in singles in May 2007 at World No. 589.

Bester went 1 and 1 in each of his next two events, but again failed at the challenger and ATP level, losing in the first round as a wildcard at Granby, Vancouver, and the Rogers Cup. He went 5 and 4 in his next four Futures events, including a semi-finals result at U.S.A. F24. He again, however, failed to win in a Challenger, losing in the first round in Rimouski and Louisville. He finished the year going 2 and 2 in two Futures events in Mexico.

=== 2008 ===
Bester began the year going 1 win and 1 loss at both New Zealand F1 and F2, in February–March. He then lost in the first round of his next six events, Canada F2, U.S.A. F9, F10, F12, F13, and the Granby Challenger. He finally reached the second round of a challenger event, Moncton, defeating Satoshi Iwabuchi before falling to Nicholas Monroe. He lost in the first round at the next three Challengers that he contested before reaching the second round at U.S.A. F26 and the semi-finals of U.S.A. F27. Bester finished the year losing in the first round of the Rimouski Challenger. For 2008, in singles, he went 1 and 7 in Challenger events and 6 and 9 in Futures.

=== 2009 ===
For 2009, as of May 17, Bester had 12 wins and 8 losses in singles after eight tournaments - Mexico F1, F2, U.S.A. F4, Canada F1 and F2, and U.S.A. F7, F8, F9, F10, and F11. His best result was winning U.S.A. F11 at Harbour Island, Florida without dropping a set, where he beat unseeded Barbadian Haydn Lewis in the final, 6–2, 7–6. This result, securing him 17 ATP points, saw his ranking soar by exactly 100 places.

In doubles, Bester and compatriot Vasek Pospisil reached the quarter-finals of U.S.A. F5. The following week he and another Canadian, Kamil Pajkowski, also reached the quarters, this time of Canada F1. The week after, Bester again reached the quarter-finals, of Canada F2, partnering Portuguese player Gastão Elias. His contract with coach Ellis Ferreira expired in March.

In early April, Bester and partner, compatriot Milos Raonic, won U.S.A. F7, defeating Lester Cook and Treat Conrad Huey in the final. After losing in the final qualifying round at both U.S.A. F12 and F13 in singles, Bester reached the quarter-finals of U.S.A. F14, picking up 3 ATP ranking points in the process. This result helped him jump a further 22 places in the singles rankings, to World No. 611. The following week his doubles ranking took a dive from World No. 393 to No. 687.

In doubles, Bester partnered American Greg Ouellette for U.S.A. F10, F12, F13, and F14, with the tandem reaching the finals of the first these tourneys, the semi-finals of the next, followed by ad quarter-finals appearance, and then a second finals.

Bester, in mid-July, has lost in the second round of singles qualifying for the Fifth Third Bank Tennis Championships, as the No. 5 seed, to unheralded William Ward of New Zealand, 5–7, 4–6. The following week, he lost in the qualifying round of the Granby Challenger as the No. 8 seed, 7–6, 2–6, 6–7 to No. 2 seed Tobias Kamke. In doubles, he and partner Kamil Pajkowski lost in the first round as wild card entrants.

As a wild card entrant, Bester reached the quarter-finals of his hometown Odlum Brown Vancouver Open. He beat qualifier Kaes Van't Hof in the first round, 6–4, 4–6, 6–2, and No 5 seed Ryan Sweeting 1–6, 6–3, 6–4 in the second. In the quarters, Bester led for much of the third set, on serve, before succumbing to No. 3 seed Marcos Baghdatis 3–6, 7–5, 5–7. His results in Vancouver has seen his ranking rise to a new career high, World No. 544. In doubles he and partner Pajkowski lost in the opening round of qualifying. Bester did not receive a wild card for the 2009 Rogers Cup in Montreal.

The week before the U.S. Open, Bester reached the qualifying round of the 2009 Pilot Pen Tennis tournament, an ATP 250 series event, defeating No. 4 seed Victor Crivoi 6–2, 6–1, and Ivan Dodig before falling to Frederik Nielsen 4–6, 6–7^{(4)}. The week after the Open, Bester reached the second round of the USTA Challenger of Oklahoma, defeating in-form compatriot Milos Raonic 7–6^{(11)}, 5–7, 7–6^{(2)} before falling to No. 6 seed Ryan Sweeting 3–6, 3–6. In doubles he and compatriot Kamil Pajkowski lost in the first round. Bester lost in the quarter-finals of U.S.A. F23, having defeated No. 8 seed Nikita Kryvonos in the second round in straight sets before falling to former World No. 14 Jan-Michael Gambill 3–6, 6–7^{(5)}. This result helped him reach yet another new career high singles ranking of World No. 503.

Bester lost in the first round of qualifying at the Natomas Men's Professional Tennis Tournament, to Tigran Martirosyan 7–6, 3–6, 5–7. The following week he lost in the second round of qualifying for the inaugural Royal Bank of Scotland Challenger, played in Tiburon, California, to No. 7 seed Artem Sitak 2–6, 3–6. He reached a new career high singles ranking on October 19, World No. 495. Four weeks ago Bester upset No. 2 seed Michael McClune in straight sets and young French talent Jonathan Eysseric 6–2, 6–2 before succumbing to No. 7 seed and eventual champion Arnau Bruges-Davi in the quarter-finals of U.S.A. F26. In doubles he and Eysseric, unseeded, won the tournament. Bester did not compete in any more tournaments for the year. He finished 2009 ranked World No. 510 in singles and No. 572 in doubles.

=== 2010 ===
Bester launched his 2010 campaign at Canada F1 ITF event in Gatineau where, as the number 5 seed, he easily defeated Canadian veteran and qualifier Jean-François Berard 6–2, 6–2 before falling to another qualifier, American Robbye Poole, 6–7, 3–6. In doubles, he and partner Kamil Pajkowski, unseeded, lost in the second round. Bester did not compete in Canada F2 the following week.

In March Bester reached the second round of Canada F3 (in Sherbrooke) in singles as well as in doubles, again partnering Pajkowski. The following week he lost in the first round both in singles and doubles (again partnering Pajkowski) at the Challenger Banque Nationale in Rimouski. The week after Bester lost in the second round of the U.S.A. F9 tournament in Little Rock, to No. 1 seed Lester Cook. In doubles, he and partner Phillip Simmonds, the No. 4 seeds, lost in the quarter-finals.

In April Bester qualified for the main singles draw of the 2010 Baton Rouge Pro Tennis Classic, where he lost in the first round to Joshua Goodall 6–2, 4–6, 5–7. Two weeks later he lost in the first round of U.S.A. F10 (Vero Beach). The following week, the first of May, Bester reached the semi-finals of U.S.A. F11 (Orange Park, Florida). The points won there allowed him to reach a new career-high ranking of World No. 492. The next week Bester competed just in doubles at the 2010 Sarasota Open. He and partner Michael Venus lost in the opening round as a wild card entrant. The following week Bester failed to qualify for the 2010 LA Tennis Open USTA Men's Challenger, losing in the first round as the No. 8 seed to eventual qualifier Eric Nunez.

In May–June Bester put together a nice little winning streak. At the 2010 Weil Tennis Academy Challenger, he won all three of his qualifying matches in three sets, twice coming back from a set down. In the main draw Bester opened by knocking off No. 6 Robert Kendrick, who was runner-up at the LA Tennis Open the week before, 2–6, 6–3, 7–6^{(2)}. He next lost soundly, however, to Tim Smyczek, 3–6, 1–6. Bester did not play doubles. After a couple of weeks off, Bester then continued his good play in reaching the final of France F9, as the tournament's No. 8 seed. He fell to No. 5 seed Augustin Gensse 1–6, 4–6. And Bester and up-and-coming French player Jonathan Eysseric won the doubles event. The resulting rankings points earned saw Bester reach a new career high in singles, as he became World No. 470. The following week at France F10, again as the No. 8 seed, reached the quarter-finals in singles while repeating as doubles champions playing with Eysseric, this time the No. 1 seeds. The week after in singles Bester fell however in the first round of France F11. Unseeded, he lost to No. 7 seed Romain Jouan in straight sets, a player he defeated in straight sets in fact, two weeks earlier. Again playing doubles with Eysseric, the pair, the No. 2 seeds this time, failed to win a third straight title in losing their first match. His singles ranking rose to another new career best, World No. 456.

The following week Bester won his second career ITF title, France F12, as the No. 7 seed. En route he beat No. 3 seed and World No. 286 Laurent Rochette 7–6, 2–6, 6–2 in the quarters, unseeded, former junior U.S. Open doubles champion, Jérôme Inzerillo, 2–6, 7–5, 6–4 in semis, and No. 4 seed Augustin Gensse in the final, 6–2, 2–6, 6–2. In doubles, Philip and Rochette lost the finals, as the No. 2 seeded pair, to the top seeds, Jouan and Inzerillo. The very next week Bester was home to compete in a Tennis British Columbia event, the Stanley Park Open, and won it, defeating BC Tennis No. 3 ranked Henry Choi in the final, 6–4, 6–4. Bester was right back in action the next week at the 2010 Challenger Banque Nationale de Granby. The new World No. 380, a wild-card entrant, lost to compatriot and eventual finalist Milos Raonic in the first round, 4–6, 5–7. He did not play doubles. The following week too Bester had a wild card in a Challenger, his hometown Odlum Brown Vancouver Open. He again lost in the first round, however, to Nick Lindahl, 6–4, 6–7^{(5)}, 4–6. In doubles, he and partner Kamil Pajkowski lost in the final qualifying round.

The following week Bester defeated No. 6 seed Florent Serra in straight sets in the first round of qualifying for the 2010 Rogers Cup. He lost in the qualifying round to Michael Russell however, 2–6, 2–6, and he did not play doubles. After a week off, Bester qualified for the 2010 Pilot Pen Tennis in singles, having defeated, in order, No. 6 seed Björn Phau in two tie-breakers, Sergei Bubka 7–5 in the third, and Andrew Anderson in three sets to do so. It is the first time that Bester has qualified in singles for an ATP Tour event. After a first round bye - he received the spot in the draw reserved for No. 4 seed Mardy Fish who withdrew - Philip lost to Illya Marchenko 3–6, 3–6.

After a week off, Bester began a stint in Europe by reaching the semi-finals in singles at ITF Spain F32, in Oviedo on hard courts, as the No. 1 seed. In doubles, he and frequent partner Kamil Pajkowski reached the finals unseeded. The following week Bester, as the No. 2 seed at Spain F33 in Móstoles, reached the final round, where he lost to No. 1 seed Roberto Bautista-Agut, 7–6^{(4)}, 4–6, 2–6. This result has seen ranking rise to a new career-high World No. 341. In doubles, he and Pajkowski, again unseeded, captured the title. The week after Bester, as the No. 5 seed at France F15 in Plaisir, reached the semi-finals. In doubles, he and Pajkowski lost in the second round. Then the following week Bester was right back in action as the No. 3 seed in singles at Canada F5 in Markham, Ontario. He lost in the quarter-finals to No. 5 seed Nicholas Monroe 4–6, 2–6. He and Pajkowski, the No. 4 seeds in doubles, lost in the first round. The following week, when the Canada F5 results were included in the rankings, Bester found himself yet again at a new career-best World No. 333.

After two weeks off from tour action, Bester again lost in Monroe in singles, this time in the qualifying round of the 2010 Calabasas Pro Tennis Championships and in three sets. In doubles he and partner Ashwin Kumar reached the second round. This result saw his doubles ranking reach a new career-high, at World No. 368. During the last week of October at U.S.A. F28, in Birmingham, Alabama (on clay), Bester, as the No. 2 seed, defeated No. 1 seed James Lemke 0–6, 6–2, 6–0 to capture the singles finals. In doubles he and Pajkowski, the No. 2 seeds, took the title. After a week off from tour events Bester tour event Bester, as the No. 2 seed in singles at U.S.A. F30 in Pensacola, Florida, lost in the second round, to eventual finalist Phillip Simmonds, 4–6, 3–6. In doubles he and partner Pajkowski, the No. 1 seeds, also lost in the second round (semi-finals), again to Simmonds, and his partner Mark Oljaca.

The following week Bester was the top seed at U.S.A. F31, again in Florida (Amelia Island) and on clay. He defeated World No. 765 Devin Britton in straight sets, the player he lost to last week, Phillip Simmonds, 6–3, 6–3, Bulgarian Davis Cupper Dimitar Kutrovsky, 4–6, 6–2, 6–2, Haitian Davis Cupper Olivier Sajous 6–2, 7–5, and Hungarian Davis Cupper Ádám Kellner in the final Sunday, 7–6^{(2)}, 6–4 to capture his third Futures title of the year. He and Pajkowski, the No. 1 seeds in doubles, lost in the semi-finals. This result saw he achieve yet another career high singles ranking, World No. 275.

Bester finished 2010 ranked World No. 278 in singles and No. 369 in doubles.

=== 2011 ===
Bester began the year by reaching the second round of singles qualifying for the 2011 Heineken Open. After defeating World No. 272 Charles-Antoine Brezac in a third-set tie-break, he lost to World No. 87 Brian Dabul, 4–6, 6–7^{(1)}. The following week Bester for the first time in his career competed in qualifying for a grand slam event. He lost, however, in the first round of singles qualifying for the 2011 Australian Open to World No. 210 Nicolás Massú, 4–6, 4–6.

The following week Bester reached the second round of the 2011 Honolulu Challenger, defeating No. 5 seed Grega Žemlja 7–5, 6–1 before losing to Alex Kuznetsov 6–4, 4–6, 4–6. In doubles, he and partner Kamil Pajkowski reached the semi-finals. A week later, Bester won his second career Challenger title in doubles, partnering Peter Polansky to victory at the 2011 McDonald's Burnie International. The tandem only gained entry into the tournament as last-day alternates. In singles, Bester upset No. 1 seed Marinko Matosevic in the first round but lost to World No. 207, and eventual champion, Flavio Cipolla in the second round 3–6, 4–6. His ranking improved to World No. 268 in singles and No. 242 in doubles, both new career highs. Continuing play on the Australian Pro Tour, Bester came back from a set down to defeat British No. 2 and World No. 209 James Ward in the first round of the 2011 Caloundra International. He next lost however a rematch of two weeks earlier against Grega Žemlja, 6–7, 6–7. Žemlja went on to win the tournament. In doubles, Bester and Polansky lost in the first round.

In late February – early March, Bester began a three-week stint in the Quebec by reaching the semi-finals of Canada F1 on indoor hardcourts in Montreal, as the No. 2 seed. A week later he reached the same round at Canada F2 in Sherbrooke – in both tournaments he lost to Frenchman Charles-Antoine Brézac. In doubles, despite being seeded in both events, Bester and regular partner Pajkowski lost in the first round. In week three, the Rimouski Challenger, as the seven seed, Bester reached the second round in singles, defeating New Zealand No. 2 Artem Sitak in straight sets before falling to American Greg Ouellette 7–6^{(4)}, 6–7^{(8)}, 4–6. In doubles Bester and Pajkowski fared better, reaching the second round, where they lost to the No. 2 seeds, Frederik Nielsen and Travis Parrott.

April and early May saw Bester in the Southern states, on clay for all but one tournament. In Houston, at the ATP 250 2011 U.S. Men's Clay Court Championships, unseeded, he lost in the second round of qualifying to Tim Smyczek, despite winning the first set. The following week in Tallahassee, on hard courts, unseeded, Bester took out James Ward before succumbing easily to an in-form Wayne Odesnik 2–6, 1–6. In doubles, he and partner Frank Dancevic eliminated Carsten Ball and Chris Guccione, the top seeds, before losing in round two. Two weeks later at the 2011 Sarasota Open, Bester qualified for the main draw as the No. 1 seed where he reached the second round, losing there to No. 7 seed Eric Prodon. In doubles, he and Pajkowski lost in the first round. A week later in Savannah, Bester retired from his first round match versus Guccione with an injured hand. He and Pajkowski also withdrew from their second round doubles match due to the injury.

After a month off tour play, Bester returned to action by taking a wild card for U.S.A. F13 Futures event, held in Sacramento, and reached the quarter-finals as the top seed. In doubles, he and partner Pajkowski, the top seeds, were soundly beat however in the opening round. The pair reached the second round the following week. In singles however, Bester showed he is on his way to having recovered from injury in capturing his first title of 2011, U.S.A. F14, in Chico, California. He needed to come back from a set down in both his quarter-final and semi-final matches against opponents ranked 1187 and 769 respectively. He played a sound final however, defeating World No. 537 Blake Strode, 6–4, 6–2. Bester continued his climb up the singles rankings by reaching the second round of the 2011 Nielsen Pro Tennis Championships, the fifth time he has done so in six Challenger events played this year. His singles ranking reached a career best World No. 229.

Missing singles No. 1 Milos Raonic and No. 2 Frank Dancevic, seeing his first Davis Cup action since 2006, Bester capped off a love-two match deficit to see Canada advance to the World Group play-off round. It was his last match action of the year however, due to a fracture of his left hand.

== ATP Challenger Tour and ITF Futures finals ==
=== Singles: 19 (9 titles, 10 runners-up) ===
Legend
ATP Challenger Tour (0–1)
ITF Futures (9–9)

Result	W–L	Date	Tournament	Tier	Surface	Opponent	Score
Win	1–0	May 2009	USA F11, Tampa	Futures	Clay	(Barbados) Haydn Lewis	6–2, 7–6^{(9–7)}
Loss	1–1	Jun 2010	France F9, Toulon	Futures	Clay	(France) Augustin Gensse	1–6, 4–6
Win	2–1	Jul 2010	France F12, Saint-Gervais	Futures	Clay	(France) Augustin Gensse	6–2, 2–6, 6–2
Loss	2–2	Sep 2010	Spain F33, Móstoles	Futures	Clay	(Spain) Roberto Bautista-Agut	7–6^{(7–4)}, 4–6, 2–6
Win	3–2	Oct 2010	USA F28, Birmingham	Futures	Clay	(Australia) James Lemke	0–6, 6–2, 6–0
Win	4–2	Nov 2010	USA F31, Amelia Island	Futures	Clay	(Hungary) Ádám Kellner	7–6^{(7–2)}, 6–4
Win	5–2	Jun 2011	USA F14, Chico	Futures	Hard	(United States) Blake Strode	6–4, 6–2
Win	6–2	Jul 2013	Canada F3, Kelowna	Futures	Hard	(Canada) Brayden Schnur	6–7^{(9–11)}, 7–6^{(8–6)}, 6–3
Loss	6–3	Aug 2013	Canada F5, Calgary	Futures	Hard	(Canada) Brayden Schnur	6–7^{(5–7)}, 6–3, 6–7^{(4–7)}
Loss	6–4	Sep 2013	Canada F9, Markham	Futures	Hard (i)	(Canada) Filip Peliwo	Walkover
Loss	6–5	Sep 2014	Canada F11, Markham	Futures	Hard (i)	(United Kingdom) Farris Fathi Gosea	6–7^{(8–10)}, 6–3, 4–6
Loss	6–6	Dec 2014	Mexico F15, Mérida	Futures	Hard	(United States) Dennis Novikov	4–6, 4–6
Win	7–6	Mar 2015	Italy F2, Trento	Futures	Carpet (i)	(France) Quentin Halys	3–6, 7–5, 6–3
Loss	7–7	Mar 2015	Canada F1, Gatineau	Futures	Hard (i)	(United States) Tennys Sandgren	3–6, 6–7^{(7–9)}
Win	8–7	Jun 2015	Canada F3, Richmond	Futures	Hard	(Canada) Brayden Schnur	3–6, 6–4, 7–6^{(7–4)}
Loss	8–8	Jul 2015	Granby, Canada	Challenger	Hard	(France) Vincent Millot	4–6, 4–6
Loss	8–9	Jan 2016	USA F1, Los Angeles	Futures	Hard	(United States) Stefan Kozlov	6–7^{(7–9)}, 7–6^{(7–3)}, 3–6
Win	9–9	Jul 2016	Canada F5, Saskatoon	Futures	Hard	(Canada) Peter Polansky	6–4, 4–6, 6–4
Loss	9–10	Apr 2017	USA F13, Little Rock	Futures	Hard	(Canada) Brayden Schnur	6–7^{(4–7)}, 1–6

== ATP Challenger Tour and ITF Futures doubles titles (20) ==
Legend
ATP Challenger Tour (7)
ITF Futures (13)

No.	Date	Tournament	Tier	Surface	Partner	Opponents	Score
1.	Nov 2007	Mexico F12, Mazatlán	Futures	Hard	(United States) Glenn Weiner	(Mexico) Fernando Cabrera (Mexico) Carlos Palencia	6–3, 6–2
2.	Jul 2008	Granby, Canada	Challenger	Hard	(Canada) Peter Polansky	(United States) Alberto Francis (United States) Nicholas Monroe	2–6, 6–1, [10–5]
3.	Apr 2009	USA F7, Mobile	Futures	Hard	(Canada) Milos Raonic	(United States) Lester Cook (Philippines) Treat Conrad Huey	6–3, 1–6, [10–5]
4.	Oct 2009	USA F26, Mansfield	Futures	Hard	(France) Jonathan Eysseric	(United States) Brett Joelson (United States) Todd Paul	6–4, 6–7^{(3–7)}, [10–7]
5.	Jun 2010	France F9, Toulon	Futures	Clay	(France) Jonathan Eysseric	(Australia) Ashwin Kumar (India) Rupesh Roy	6–3, 6–4
6.	Jul 2010	France F10, Montauban	Futures	Clay	(France) Jonathan Eysseric	(France) Julien Obry (France) Albano Olivetti	Walkover
7.	Sep 2010	Spain F33, Móstoles	Futures	Hard	(Canada) Kamil Pajkowski	(Spain) Óscar Burrieza (Spain) Javier Martí	7–6^{(7–5)}, 4–6, [13–11]
8.	Oct 2010	USA F28, Birmingham	Futures	Clay	(Canada) Kamil Pajkowski	(Germany) Dennis Blömke (Australia) James Lemke	6–7^{(4–7)}, 6–4, [10–5]
9.	Feb 2011	Burnie, Australia	Challenger	Hard	(Canada) Peter Polansky	(Australia) Marinko Matosevic (New Zealand) Rubin Jose Statham	6–4, 3–6, [14–12]
10.	May 2012	USA F13, Tampa	Futures	Clay	(Canada) Kamil Pajkowski	(Barbados) Haydn Lewis (Haiti) Olivier Sajous	7–6^{(8–6)}, 6–1
11.	Jul 2012	Granby, Canada	Challenger	Hard	(Canada) Vasek Pospisil	(Japan) Yuichi Ito (Japan) Takuto Niki	6–1, 6–2
12.	Nov 2014	Italy F39, Santa Margherita di Pula	Futures	Clay	(Italy) Matteo Volante	(Argentina) Gastón-Arturo Grimolizzi (Italy) Giorgio Portaluri	6–2, 6–4
13.	Dec 2014	Mexico F15, Mérida	Futures	Hard	(United States) Eric Quigley	(South Africa) Dean O'Brien (Colombia) Juan Carlos Spir	4–6, 7–6^{(7–5)}, [12–10]
14.	Mar 2015	Drummondville, Canada	Challenger	Hard (i)	(Australia) Chris Guccione	(Canada) Frank Dancevic (Germany) Frank Moser	6–4, 7–6^{(8–6)}
15.	Jul 2015	Canada F4, Kelowna	Futures	Hard	(United States) Matt Seeberger	(United States) Hunter Nicholas (United States) Raymond Sarmiento	7–6^{(8–6)}, 6–4
16.	Jul 2015	Granby, Canada	Challenger	Hard	(Canada) Peter Polansky	(France) Enzo Couacaud (Australia) Luke Saville	6–7^{(5–7)}, 7–6^{(7–2)}, [10–7]
17.	Feb 2016	Cuernavaca, Mexico	Challenger	Hard	(Canada) Peter Polansky	(El Salvador) Marcelo Arévalo (Peru) Sergio Galdós	6–4, 3–6, [10–6]
18.	Jun 2016	Canada F3, Richmond	Futures	Hard	(Canada) Peter Polansky	(United Kingdom) Farris Fathi Gosea (United States) Tim Kopinski	7–6^{(7–2)}, 6–2
19.	Jul 2016	Canada F5, Saskatoon	Futures	Hard	(Canada) Peter Polansky	(Canada) Christian Lakoseljac (Canada) David Volfson	6–3, 6–2
20.	Sep 2016	Cary, United States	Challenger	Hard	(Canada) Peter Polansky	(United States) Stefan Kozlov (United States) Austin Krajicek	6–2, 6–2

== Junior Grand Slam finals ==
=== Boys' singles: 1 (1 runner–up) ===
Result	Year	Tournament	Surface	Opponent	Score
Loss	2006	French Open	Clay	(Slovakia) Martin Klizan	3–6, 1–6

== Sources ==
- ATP.com Bester 'Playing Activity' page for tour career in singles
- ATP.com Bester 'Playing Activity' page for tour career in doubles
