= James Lemke (tennis) =

Australian tennis player

- Country (sports): Australia
- Residence: Melbourne, Australia
- Born: 25 January 1988 (age 38) Melbourne, Australia
- Turned pro: 2006
- Plays: Right-handed (two-handed backhand)
- Prize money: US$97,047

Singles
- Career record: 0–1
- Career titles: 0; 0 Challenger, 6 Futures
- Highest ranking: No. 224 (6 June 2011)

Grand Slam singles results
- Australian Open: Q1 (2010, 2011, 2012)
- French Open: Q1 (2011)
- Wimbledon: Q1 (2011)
- US Open: Q1 (2011)

Doubles
- Career record: 0–1
- Career titles: 0; 0 Challenger, 6 Futures
- Highest ranking: No. 293 (10 October 2011)

Grand Slam doubles results
- Australian Open: 1R (2011)
- Last updated on: 9 August 2021.

James Lemke (born 25 January 1988) is an Australian former professional tennis player. He competed mainly on the ATP Challenger Tour and ITF Futures, both in singles and doubles. He reached his highest ATP singles ranking, No. 224 on 6 June 2011, and his highest ATP doubles ranking, No. 293, on 10 October 2011.

== ATP Challenger and ITF Futures finals ==
=== Singles: 13 (6–7) ===
Legend ATP Challenger (0–0) ITF Futures (6–7)	Finals by surface Hard (1–1) Clay (4–5) Grass (1–1) Carpet (0–0)

Result	W–L	Date	Tournament	Tier	Surface	Opponent	Score
Win	1–0	Nov 2009	USA F27, Birmingham	Futures	Clay	(Republic of Ireland) Conor Niland	4–6, 6–2, 7–5
Loss	1–1	Nov 2009	USA F28, Niceville	Futures	Clay	(Republic of Ireland) Conor Niland	6–3, 4–6, 0–6
Loss	1–2	Dec 2009	Australia F11, Bendigo	Futures	Hard	(Australia) Matthew Ebden	1–6, 1–6
Win	2–2	Jun 2010	Germany F6, Wolfsburg	Futures	Clay	(Czech Republic) Roman Jebavy	6–4, 6–2
Loss	2–3	Jul 2010	France F11, Bourg-en-Bresse	Futures	Clay	(France) Romain Jouan	2–6, 7–6^{(7–5)}, 1–6
Loss	2–4	Oct 2010	USA F28, Birmingham	Futures	Clay	(Canada) Philip Bester	6–0, 2–6, 0–6
Loss	2–5	Nov 2010	USA F29, Niceville	Futures	Clay	(Hungary) Adam Kellner	3–6, 6–7^{(3–7)}
Win	3–5	Feb 2011	Australia F1, Mildura	Futures	Grass	(Australia) Isaac Frost	6–4, 6–2
Win	4–5	Apr 2011	Australia F3, Ipswich	Futures	Clay	(Canada) Erik Chvojka	6–2, 6–0
Win	5–5	Apr 2011	Australia F4, Bundaberg	Futures	Clay	(Canada) Erik Chvojka	6–2, 6–4
Loss	5–6	May 2011	Italy F9, Naples	Futures	Clay	(Netherlands) Antal Van Der Duim	2–6, 4–6
Win	6–6	Sep 2011	Australia F6, Cairns	Futures	Hard	(Australia) Benjamin Mitchell	6–1, 4–6, 6–3
Loss	6–7	Feb 2013	Australia F2, Mildura	Futures	Grass	(Australia) Sam Groth	1–6, 4–6

=== Doubles: 11 (6–5) ===
Legend ATP Challenger (0–2) ITF Futures (6–3)	Finals by surface Hard (2–1) Clay (4–2) Grass (0–1) Carpet (0–1)

Result	W–L	Date	Tournament	Tier	Surface	Partner	Opponents	Score
Loss	0–1	Sep 2009	Germany F17, Kempten	Futures	Clay	(Germany) Richard Waite	(Moldova) Radu Albot (Czech Republic) Jiri Skoloudik	1–6, 2–6
Loss	0–2	Feb 2010	Burnie, Australia	Challenger	Hard	(Australia) Dane Propoggia	(Australia) Sam Groth (Australia) Matthew Ebden	7–6^{(10–8)}, 6–7^{(4–7)}, [8–10]
Win	1–2	Aug 2010	Austria F4, St. Pölten	Futures	Clay	(Australia) Colin Ebelthite	(Austria) Pascal Brunner (Georgia (country)) Lado Chikhladze	7–5, 6–3
Loss	1–3	Oct 2010	USA F28, Birmingham	Futures	Clay	(Germany) Dennis Bloemke	(Canada) Philip Bester (Canada) Kamil Pajkowski	7–6^{(7–4)}, 4–6, [5–10]
Loss	1–4	Mar 2011	Kyoto, Japan	Challenger	Carpet	(Germany) Andre Begemann	(Germany) Dominik Meffert (Germany) Simon Stadler	5–7, 6–2, [7–10]
Win	2–4	Apr 2011	Australia F3, Ipswich	Futures	Clay	(Australia) Dane Propoggia	(South Korea) Soong-Jae Cho (South Korea) Jisung Nam	6–7^{(4–7)}, 6–2, [10–5]
Win	3–4	Sep 2011	Australia F5, Alice Springs	Futures	Hard	(Australia) Brydan Klein	(China) Peng Gao (China) Wan Gao	6–1, 6–1
Win	4–4	Sep 2011	Australia F6, Cairns	Futures	Hard	(Australia) Brydan Klein	(South Korea) Jae-Sung An (Indonesia) Elbert Sie	walkover
Loss	4–5	Feb 2012	Australia F2, Mildura	Futures	Grass	(Australia) Dane Propoggia	(Germany) Gero Kretschmer (Germany) Alexander Satschko	4–6, 5–7
Win	5–5	Apr 2012	Australia F4, Bundaberg	Futures	Clay	(Australia) Dane Propoggia	(Australia) Adam Feeney (Australia) Adam Hubble	6–3, 6–2
Win	6–5	Apr 2014	Australia F5, Glen Iris	Futures	Clay	(Australia) Dane Propoggia	(Australia) Daniel Ferretti (Australia) Aaron Leeder-Chard	6–1, 6–3
