= Adam Feeney =

Australian tennis player

- Country (sports): Australia
- Born: 7 March 1985 (age 41) Gosford, Australia
- Height: 1.78 m (5 ft 10 in)
- Turned pro: 2002
- Retired: 2013
- Plays: Right-handed
- Prize money: $246,101

Singles
- Career record: 0–0 (Grand Slam, ATP Tour level, and Davis Cup)
- Career titles: 0
- Highest ranking: No. 248 (10 September 2007)

Grand Slam singles results
- Australian Open: Q2 (2008, 2013)
- Wimbledon: Q1 (2008)
- US Open: Q1 (2008)

Doubles
- Career record: 7–7 (Grand Slam, ATP Tour and Davis Cup)
- Career titles: 0
- Highest ranking: No. 100 (28 April 2008)

Grand Slam doubles results
- Australian Open: 3R (2008, 2011)
- Wimbledon: 2R (2008)

Adam Feeney (born 7 March 1985) is a professional Australian tennis player.

== Tennis career ==
Feeney's highest ATP singles ranking was World No. 248, which he reached on 10 September 2007 and a career high in doubles was World No. 100 which he reached on 28 April 2008.

Adam Feeney was a successful junior, especially at doubles. At the 2003 Wimbledon Championships, Feeney, along with fellow Australian Chris Guccione, made the final of the Boys' Doubles. They lost the final to the Romanian pairing of Horia Tecău and Boys' Singles champion Florin Mergea.

Feeney made his first final in a professional tournament in March 2006 in the Australia F4 tournament in Bairnsdale, Victoria. He lost to Konstantinos Economidis in the final. In August 2006 Feeney won his first pro tournament, the USA F21. He defeated South African Kevin Anderson in the final. In September 2006, Feeney won the Australia F9 tournament, winning the final against Miles Armstrong. In July 2007, Feeney won the Great Britain F13 tournament, defeating Daniel King-Turner in the final.

Feeney has defeated many world class tennis players in his career. For example, Feeney defeated 16-year-old Frenchman Gaël Monfils in the ITF Victorian Junior Championships 2003.

In 2006 he defeated American Sam Querrey, who became World No. 17 in 2011 in a Futures tournament in the United States. In 2008, Feeney defeated Bernard Tomic in an Australian Futures tournament. He has also had victories over Horacio Zeballos, Karol Beck, Grigor Dimitrov, Kristian Pless, Mikhail Kukushkin and Dominik Hrbatý.

== Career finals ==
=== Singles: 2 (6–9) ===
Legend (singles)
Grand Slam (0–0)
ATP World Tour Finals (0–0)
ATP World Tour Masters 1000 (0–0)
ATP World Tour 500 Series (0–0)
ATP World Tour 250 Series (0–0)
ATP Challenger Tour (0–0)
ITF Futures Tour (6–9)

Outcome	No.	Date	Tournament	Surface	Opponent	Score
Runner-up	1.	20 March 2006	Australia F4, Bairnsdale, Australia	Clay	(Greece) Konstantinos Economidis	3–6, 2–6
Winner	2.	7 August 2006	U.S.A. F21, WI, U.S.A	Hard	(South Africa) Kevin Anderson	6–3, 6–7^{(2–7)}, 6–1
Runner-up	3.	4 September 2006	Australia F7, Australia	Hard	(Canada) Rob Steckley	5–7, 3–6
Winner	4.	25 September 2006	Australia F9, Australia	Hard	(Australia) Miles Armstrong	6–3, 6–3
Winner	5.	30 July 2007	Great Britain F13, Great Britain	Grass	(New Zealand) Daniel King-Turner	6–4, 6–4
Runner-up	6.	6 August 2007	Great Britain F14, Great Britain	Hard	(Australia) Robert Smeets	4–6, 6–4, 4–6
Runner-up	7.	10 March 2008	Australia F3, Australia	Hard	(Australia) Colin Ebelthite	4–6, 2–6
Runner-up	8.	1 December 2008	Australia F12, Australia	Hard	(Australia) Marinko Matosevic	3–6, 6–7^{(4–7)}
Runner-up	9.	9 March 2009	New Zealand F1, New Zealand	Hard	(Australia) Rameez Junaid	3–6, 3–6
Runner-up	10.	10 September 2012	Australia F7, Australia	Hard	(Australia) Alex Bolt	7–5, 3–6, 1–6
Runner-up	11.	17 September 2012	Australia F8, Australia	Hard	(Australia) Matt Reid	3–6, 6–3, 3–6
Winner	12.	1 October 2012	Australia F9, Australia	Hard	(Australia) Alex Bolt	3–6, 7–6^{(7–2)}, 6–2
Runner-up	13.	8 October 2012	Australia F10, Australia	Hard	(New Zealand) Michael Venus	3–6, 6–3, 3–6
Winner	14.	3 June 2013	Thailand F3, Thailand	Hard	(Thailand) Pruchya Isaro	6–4, 6–1
Winner	15.	9 September 2013	Australia F6, Australia	Hard	(Australia) Andrew Whittington	7–6^{(8–6)}, 6–4
