= Paula Badosa career statistics =

Career finals
| Discipline | Type | Won | Lost | Total |
|---|---|---|---|---|
| Singles | Grand Slam | – | – | – |
| Singles | WTA Finals | – | – | – |
| Singles | WTA 1000 | 1 | 0 | 1 |
| Singles | WTA Tour | 3 | 1 | 4 |
| Singles | Olympics | – | – | – |
| Singles | Total | 4 | 1 | 5 |
| Doubles | Grand Slam | – | – | – |
| Doubles | WTA Finals | – | – | – |
| Doubles | WTA 1000 | – | – | – |
| Doubles | WTA Tour | – | – | – |
| Doubles | Olympics | – | – | – |
| Doubles | Total | – | – | – |

This is a list of the main career statistics of professional Spanish tennis player Paula Badosa.

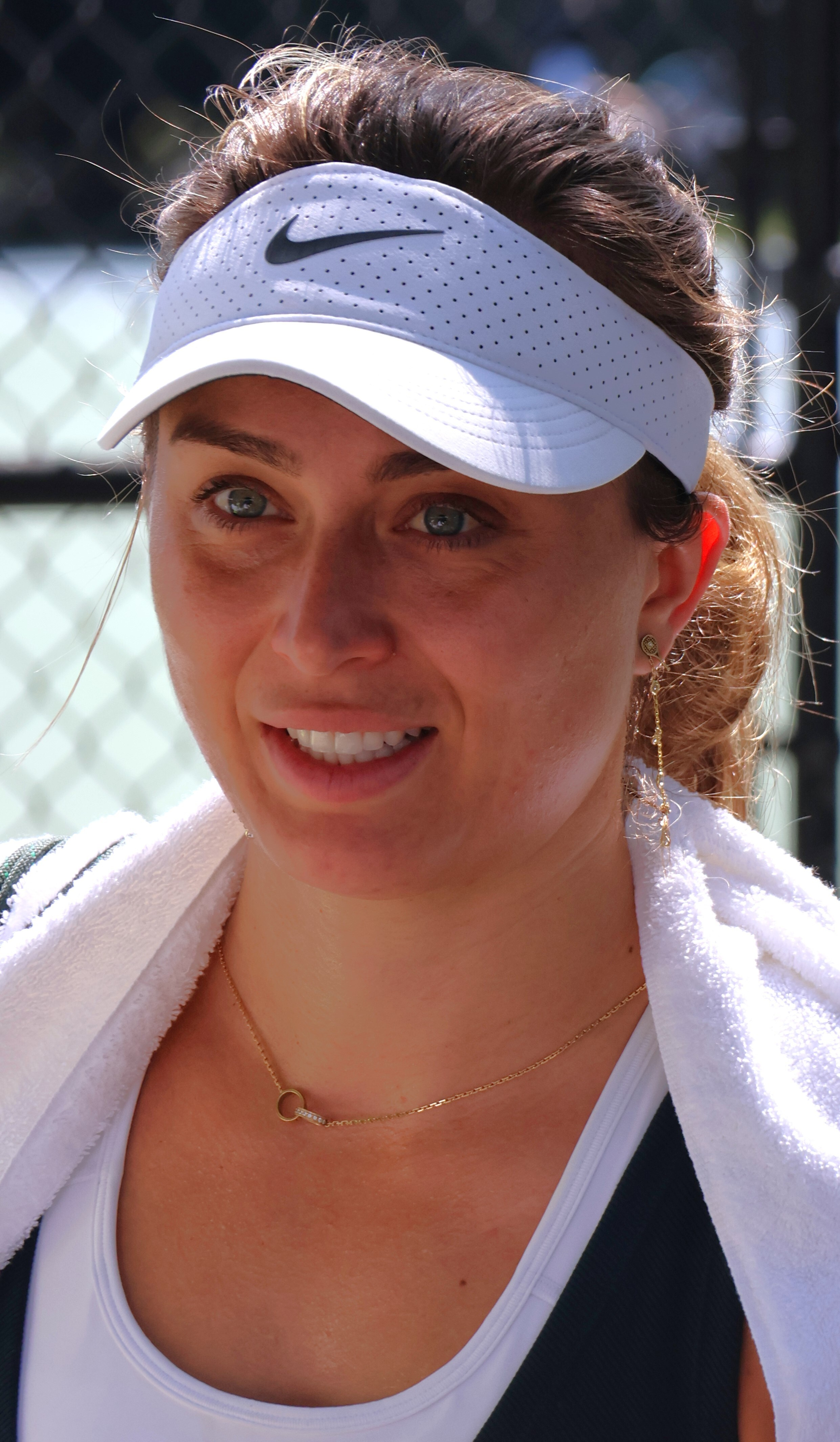
Badosa at the 2024 Washington Open.

== Performance timelines ==
Key
| W | F | SF | QF | #R | RR | Q# | P# | DNQ | A | Z# | PO | G | S | B | NMS | NTI | P | NH |

(W) winner; (F) finalist; (SF) semifinalist; (QF) quarterfinalist; (#R) rounds 4, 3, 2, 1; (RR) round-robin stage; (Q#) qualification round; (P#) preliminary round; (DNQ) did not qualify; (A) absent; (Z#) Davis/Fed Cup Zonal Group (with number indication) or (PO) play-off; (G) gold, (S) silver or (B) bronze Olympic/Paralympic medal; (NMS) not a Masters tournament; (NTI) not a Tier I tournament; (P) postponed; (NH) not held; (SR) strike rate (events won / competed); (W–L) win–loss record.
To avoid confusion and double counting, these charts are updated at the conclusion of a tournament or when the player's participation has ended.

Only main-draw results in WTA Tour, Grand Slam tournaments, Fed Cup/Billie Jean King Cup, Hopman Cup, United Cup and Olympic Games are included in win–loss records.

=== Singles ===
Current through the 2026 Madrid Open.

| Tournament | 2015 | 2016 | 2017 | 2018 | 2019 | 2020 | 2021 | 2022 | 2023 | 2024 | 2025 | 2026 | SR | W–L | Win % |
|---|---|---|---|---|---|---|---|---|---|---|---|---|---|---|---|
Grand Slam tournaments
| Australian Open | A | A | A | A | 1R | 2R | 1R | 4R | A | 3R | SF | 2R | 0 / 7 | 12–7 | 63% |
| French Open | A | A | A | A | Q1 | 4R | QF | 3R | A | 3R | 3R | A | 0 / 5 | 13–5 | 72% |
| Wimbledon | A | A | A | Q1 | 1R | NH | 4R | 4R | 2R | 4R | 1R | 1R | 0 / 7 | 10–7 | 59% |
| US Open | Q2 | A | A | Q2 | 1R | 1R | 2R | 2R | A | QF | A | 2R | 0 / 6 | 7–6 | 54% |
| Win–loss | 0–0 | 0–0 | 0–0 | 0–0 | 0–3 | 4–3 | 8–4 | 9–4 | 1–1 | 11–4 | 7–3 | 1–2 | 0 / 25 | 42–25 | 63% |
Year-end championships
| WTA Finals | DNQ | | | | | NH | SF | DNQ | | | | | 0 / 1 | 2–2 | 50% |
National representation
| Summer Olympics | NH | A | NH | | | | QF | NH | | A | NH | | 0 / 1 | 3–1 | 75% |
| Billie Jean King Cup (Note: Formerly known as Fed Cup until 2020.) | A | A | A | A | A | A (Note: Edition is split into the two years due to COVID-19.) | | RR | RR (Note: Was with the team but did not play any matches.) | 1R | 1R | | 0 / 4 | 1–3 | 25% |
WTA 1000 tournaments
| Qatar Open | NTI | A | NTI | A | NTI | A | NTI | 3R | NTI | 2R | 2R | A | 0 / 3 | 3–3 | 50% |
| Dubai Championships | A | NTI | A | NTI | A | NTI | A | NTI | 1R | 1R | 3R | 2R | 0 / 4 | 3–4 | 43% |
| Indian Wells Open | A | A | A | A | Q1 | NH | W | SF | 3R | A | A | 1R | 1 / 4 | 11–3 | 79% |
| Miami Open | 3R | 1R | 1R | A | Q1 | NH | 2R | QF | 3R | 2R | 4R (Note: Withdrew during the tournament. Not counted as a loss.) | 2R | 0 / 9 | 11–8 | 58% |
| Madrid Open | 1R | 1R | Q1 | Q1 | A | NH | SF | 2R | 4R | 1R | A | 1R | 0 / 7 | 7–7 | 50% |
| Italian Open | A | A | A | A | A | A | A | 3R | QF | 4R | A | A | 0 / 3 | 8–3 | 73% |
| Canadian Open | A | A | A | A | A | NH | 2R | 2R | A | 2R | A | A | 0 / 3 | 2–3 | 40% |
| Cincinnati Open | A | A | A | A | A | Q2 | QF | 2R | A | SF | A | A | 0 / 3 | 7–3 | 70% |
| China Open | A | A | A | A | Q1 | NH | | | A | SF | 3R | 2R | 0 / 3 | 6–3 | 67% |
| Wuhan Open | A | A | A | A | A | NH | | | | A | A | A | 0 / 0 | 0–0 | – |
| Guadalajara Open | NH | | | | | | | 2R | A | NTI | | | 0 / 1 | 0–1 | 0% |
| Win–loss | 2–2 | 0–2 | 0–1 | 0–0 | 0–0 | 0–0 | 15–4 | 10–8 | 8–5 | 14–8 | 6–3 | 2–4 | 1 / 39 | 58–38 | 61% |
Career statistics
| | 2015 | 2016 | 2017 | 2018 | 2019 | 2020 | 2021 | 2022 | 2023 | 2024 | 2025 | 2026 | SR | W–L | Win% |
| Tournaments | 3 | 3 | 1 | 2 | 9 | 4 | 18 | 22 | 10 | 20 | 13 | 20 | Career total: 105 | | |
| Titles | 0 | 0 | 0 | 0 | 0 | 0 | 2 | 1 | 0 | 1 | 0 | 0 | Career total: 4 | | |
| Finals | 0 | 0 | 0 | 0 | 0 | 0 | 2 | 1 | 0 | 1 | 0 | 1 | Career total: 5 | | |
| Hard win–loss | 2–2 | 0–1 | 0–1 | 0–0 | 2–4 | 1–2 | 23–12 | 21–15 | 6–4 | 26–12 | 13–9 | 9–11 | 3 / 74 | 103–73 | 59% |
| Clay win–loss | 0–1 | 0–1 | 0–0 | 2–2 | 3–2 | 6–2 | 17–3 | 8–5 | 11–4 | 6–5 | 3–2 | 8–6 | 1 / 34 | 64–33 | 66% |
| Grass win–loss | 0–0 | 0–1 | 0–0 | 0–0 | 2–3 | NH | 3–2 | 3–2 | 1–1 | 5–2 | 2–2 | 2–3 | 0 / 16 | 18–16 | 53% |
| Overall win–loss | 2–3 | 0–3 | 0–1 | 2–2 | 7–9 | 7–4 | 43–17 | 32–22 | 18–9 | 37–19 | 18–13 | 19–20 | 4 / 124 | 185–122 | 60% |
| Win % | 40% | 0% | 0% | 50% | 44% | 64% | 72% | 59% | 67% | 66% | 58% | 49% | Career total: 61% | | |
| Year–end ranking (Note: 2013: WTA ranking–678, 2014: WTA ranking–366.) | 220 | 314 | 247 | 143 | 97 | 70 | 8 | 13 | 66 | 12 | 25 | | $9,616,071 | | |

=== Doubles ===
Current through the 2024 China Open.

| Tournament | 2016 | ... | 2019 | 2020 | 2021 | 2022 | 2023 | 2024 | SR | W–L | Win % |
|---|---|---|---|---|---|---|---|---|---|---|---|
Grand Slam tournaments
| Australian Open | A | | A | A | 2R | A | A | A | 0 / 1 | 1–1 | 50% |
| French Open | A | | A | 1R | 1R | A | A | A | 0 / 2 | 0–2 | 0% |
| Wimbledon | A | | A | NH | 2R | A | A | A | 0 / 1 | 1–1 | 50% |
| US Open | A | | A | A | A | A | A | A | 0 / 0 | 0–0 | – |
| Win–loss | 0–0 | | 0–0 | 0–1 | 2–3 | 0–0 | 0–0 | 0–0 | 0 / 4 | 2–4 | 33% |
National representation
| Summer Olympics | A | NH | | | 2R | NH | | A | 0 / 1 | 1–1 | 50% |
| Billie Jean King Cup | A | | A | A | | RR | RR | | 0 / 2 | 1–0 | 100% |
WTA 1000 tournaments
| Indian Wells Open | A | | A | NH | A | A | 1R | A | 0 / 1 | 0–1 | 0% |
| Miami Open | A | | A | NH | A | 2R | 1R | A | 0 / 2 | 1–2 | 50% |
| Madrid Open | 1R | | A | NH | 1R | 1R | QF | A | 0 / 4 | 2–4 | 33% |
| Canadian Open | A | | A | NH | 2R | A | A | A | 0 / 1 | 1–1 | 50% |
| Cincinnati Open | A | | A | A | QF | A | A | A | 0 / 1 | 2–1 | 67% |
| China Open | A | | A | NH | | | A | 2R (Note: Withdrew ahead of the second round match due to a Karolína Muchová right wrist injury.) | 0 / 1 | 1–0 | 100% |
Career statistics
| Tournaments | 1 | | 1 | 1 | 7 | 5 | 3 | 4 | Career total: 22 | | |
| Overall win–loss | 0–1 | | 1–1 | 0–1 | 5–7 | 5–2 | 2–3 | 4–0 | 0 / 22 | 17–15 | 53% |
| Year-end ranking | 1119 | | 542 | 637 | 195 | 190 | 354 | | | | |

=== Mixed doubles ===
Current through the 2024 US Open.

| Tournament | 2023 | 2024 | SR | W–L | Win % |
|---|---|---|---|---|---|
Grand Slam tournaments
| Australian Open | A | A | 0 / 0 | 0–0 | – |
| French Open | A | 1R (Note: Withdrew ahead the first round match due to incompatibility with Stefanos Tsitsipas men’s doubles schedule.) | 0 / 1 | 0–0 | – |
| Wimbledon | A (Note: Entered the draw with Stefanos Tsitsipas but withdrew due to injury.) | A | 0 / 0 | 0–0 | – |
| US Open | A | 1R | 0 / 1 | 0–1 | 0% |
| Win–loss | 0–0 | 0–1 | 0 / 2 | 0–1 | 0% |
National representation
| Summer Olympics | NH | A | 0 / 0 | 0–0 | – |
| Hopman Cup | A | NH | 0 / 0 | 0–0 | – |
WTA 1000 tournaments
| Indian Wells Open | NH | A | 0 / 0 | 0–0 | – |
Career statistics
| Tournaments | 1 | 2 | Career total: 3 | | |
| Overall win–loss | 0–0 | 0–1 | 0 / 3 | 0–1 | – |

== WTA 1000 finals ==
=== Singles: 1 (title) ===
| Result | Year | Tournament | Surface | Opponents | Score |
|---|---|---|---|---|---|
| Win | 2021 | Indian Wells Open | Hard | (Belarus) Victoria Azarenka | 7–6^{(7–5)}, 2–6, 7–6^{(7–2)} |

== WTA Tour finals ==
=== Singles: 5 (4 titles, 1 runner-up) ===
| Legend WTA 1000 (1–0) WTA 500 (2–0) WTA 250 (1–1) | Finals by surface Hard (3–0) Clay (1–1) | Finals by setting Outdoor (4–1) |

| Result | W–L | Date | Tournament | Tier | Surface | Opponent | Score |
|---|---|---|---|---|---|---|---|
| Win | 1–0 | May 2021 | Belgrade Open, Serbia | WTA 250 | Clay | (Croatia) Ana Konjuh | 6–2, 2–0 ret. |
| Win | 2–0 | Oct 2021 | Indian Wells Open, United States | WTA 1000 | Hard | (Belarus) Victoria Azarenka | 7–6^{(7–5)}, 2–6, 7–6^{(7–2)} |
| Win | 3–0 | Jan 2022 | Sydney International, Australia | WTA 500 | Hard | (Czech Republic) Barbora Krejčíková | 6–3, 4–6, 7–6^{(7–4)} |
| Win | 4–0 | Aug 2024 | Washington Open, United States | WTA 500 | Hard | (Czech Republic) Marie Bouzková | 6–1, 4–6, 6–4 |
| Loss | 4–1 | Jul 2026 | Iași Open, Romania | WTA 250 | Clay | (Egypt) Mayar Sherif | 4–6, 0–4 ret. |

== WTA 125 finals ==
=== Singles: 1 (title) ===
| Result | Date | Tournament | Surface | Opponent | Score |
|---|---|---|---|---|---|
| Win | Jul 2026 | Bastad Open, Sweden | Clay | (Switzerland) Simona Waltert | 7–5, 7–5 |

== ITF Circuit finals ==
=== Singles: 15 (7 titles, 8 runner-ups) ===
| Legend $100,000 tournaments $60,000 tournaments (1–2) $25,000 tournaments (5–6) $10,000 tournaments (1–0) | Finals by surface Hard (4–3) Clay (2–4) Carpet (1–1) |

| Result | W–L | Date | Tournament | Tier | Surface | Opponent | Score |
|---|---|---|---|---|---|---|---|
| Win | 1–0 | Nov 2013 | ITF Sant Jordi, Spain (Balearic Islands) | 10,000 | Hard | (Spain) Lucía Cervera Vázquez | 7–5, 6–0 |
| Loss | 1–1 | Oct 2014 | Abierto Victoria, Mexico | 25,000 | Hard | (Latvia) Diāna Marcinkēviča | 7–6^{(7–2)}, 3–6, 1–6 |
| Win | 2–1 | Jul 2015 | ITF Denain, France | 25,000 | Clay | (France) Irina Ramialison | 7–5, 6–0 |
| Loss | 2–2 | Apr 2016 | ITF Jackson, United States | 25,000 | Clay | (United States) Grace Min | 6–1, 2–6, 4–6 |
| Loss | 2–3 | May 2017 | ITF Caserta, Italy | 25,000 | Clay | (United States) Claire Liu | 3–6, 3–6 |
| Win | 3–3 | Aug 2017 | ITF El Espinar, Spain | 25,000 | Hard | (Turkey) Ayla Aksu | 6–2, 6–4 |
| Win | 4–3 | Feb 2018 | GB Pro-Series Glasgow, UK | 25,000 | Hard | (United Kingdom) Maia Lumsden | 2–6, 6–1, 6–3 |
| Win | 5–3 | May 2018 | ITF Les Franqueses del Valles, Spain | 25,000 | Hard | (Russia) Margarita Gasparyan | 6–4, 3–6, 6–2 |
| Win | 6–3 | Sep 2018 | Open de Valencia, Spain | 60,000+H | Clay | (Spain) Aliona Bolsova | 6–1, 4–6, 6–2 |
| Loss | 6–4 | Oct 2018 | ITF Oslo, Norway | 25,000 | Clay | (United Kingdom) Harriet Dart | 2–6, 0–1 ret. |
| Loss | 6–5 | Jan 2019 | Burnie International, Australia | 60,000 | Hard | (Australia) Belinda Woolcock | 6–7^{(3–7)}, 6–7^{(4–7)} |
| Loss | 6–6 | May 2019 | ITF Les Franqueses del Vallès, Spain | 60,000 | Hard | (United Kingdom) Katy Dunne | 5–7, 3–6 |
| Loss | 6–7 | Jun 2019 | Bredeney Ladies Open, Germany | 25,000 | Clay | (Czech Republic) Tereza Martincová | 2–6, 6–7^{(4–7)} |
| Win | 7–7 | Oct 2019 | ITF Makinohara, Japan | 25,000 | Carpet | (Japan) Nagi Hanatani | 7–5, 6–1 |
| Loss | 7–8 | Oct 2019 | ITF Hamamatsu, Japan | 25,000 | Carpet | (Japan) Eri Hozumi | 6–7^{(1–7)}, 5–4 ret. |

== Junior finals ==
=== Grand Slam tournaments ===
| Result | Year | Tournament | Surface | Opponent | Score |
|---|---|---|---|---|---|
| Win | 2015 | French Open | Clay | (Russia) Anna Kalinskaya | 6–3, 6–3 |

=== ITF Junior Circuit ===
==== Singles: 6 (3 titles, 3 runner-ups) ====
Legend
Grade A (1–0)
Grade 1/B1 (2–1)
Grade 2 (0–1)
Grade 3 (0–1)

| Result | W–L | Date | Tournament | Tier | Surface | Opponent | Score |
|---|---|---|---|---|---|---|---|
| Loss | 0–1 | Apr 2013 | ITF Benicarló, Spain | Grade 3 | Clay | (Romania) Ioana Loredana Roșca | 2–6, 5–7 |
| Win | 1–1 | Feb 2014 | Méditerranée Avenir, Morocco | Grade 1 | Clay | (Egypt) Sandra Samir | 6–4, 6–4 |
| Loss | 1–2 | Apr 2014 | ITF Benicarló, Spain | Grade 2 | Clay | (Romania) Ioana Loredana Roșca | 6–0, 1–6, 3–6 |
| Win | 2–2 | Apr 2014 | Trofeo Juan Carlos Ferrero, Spain | Grade 1 | Clay | (Romania) Ioana Loredana Roșca | 6–4, 6–4 |
| Loss | 2–3 | Jul 2014 | European Championships, Switzerland | Grade B1 | Clay | (Spain) Sara Sorribes Tormo | 4–6, 1–6 |
| Win | 3–3 | Jun 2015 | French Open, France | Grade A | Clay | (Russia) Anna Kalinskaya | 6–3, 6–3 |

== WTA Tour career earnings ==
Current after the 2024 Ningbo Open

| Year | Grand Slam singles titles | WTA singles titles | Total singles titles | Earnings ($) | Money list rank |
| 2015 | 0 | 0 | 0 | 66,113 | 214 |
| 2016 | 0 | 0 | 0 | 42,879 | 268 |
| 2017 | 0 | 0 | 0 | 35,189 | 315 |
| 2018 | 0 | 0 | 0 | 64,583 | 262 |
| 2019 | 0 | 0 | 0 | 257,299 | 139 |
| 2020 | 0 | 0 | 0 | 391,314 | 53 |
| 2021 | 0 | 2 | 2 | 2,655,962 | 7 |
| 2022 | 0 | 1 | 1 | 1,695,696 | 18 |
| 2023 | 0 | 0 | 0 | 634,235 | 74 |
| 2024 | 0 | 1 | 1 | 2,005,758 | 13 |
| Career | 0 | 4 | 4 | 7,861,209 | 97 |

== Career Grand Slam statistics ==
=== Seedings ===
The tournaments won by Badosa are in boldface, and advanced into finals by Badosa are in italics.

| Year | Australian Open | French Open | Wimbledon | US Open |
|---|---|---|---|---|
| 2015 | did not play | did not play | did not play | did not qualify |
| 2018 | did not play | did not play | did not qualify | did not qualify |
| 2019 | qualifier | did not qualify | qualifier | lucky loser |
| 2020 | not seeded | not seeded | cancelled | not seeded |
| 2021 | not seeded | 33rd | 30th | 24th |
| 2022 | 8th | 3rd | 4th | 4th |
| 2023 | did not play | did not play | not seeded | did not play |
| 2024 | not seeded | not seeded | protected ranking | 26th |
| 2025 | 11th | 10th | 9th | did not play |
| 2026 | 25th | | | |

=== Best Grand Slam results details ===
Grand Slam winners are in boldface, and runner–ups in italics.

**Australian Open**
**2025 Australian Open (11th)**
| Round | Opponent | Rank | Score |
| 1R | (China) Wang Xinyu | 37 | 6–3, 7–6^{(7–5)} |
| 2R | (Australia) Talia Gibson (WC) | 150 | 6–1, 6–0 |
| 3R | (Ukraine) Marta Kostyuk (17) | 18 | 6–4, 4–6, 6–3 |
| 4R | (Serbia) Olga Danilović | 55 | 6–1, 7–6^{(7–2)} |
| QF | (United States) Coco Gauff (3) | 3 | 7–5, 6–4 |
| SF | Aryna Sabalenka (1) | 1 | 4–6, 2–6 |

**Wimbledon Championships**
**2021 Wimbledon Championships (30th)**
| Round | Opponent | Rank | Score |
| 1R | (Spain) Aliona Bolsova | 151 | 6–2, 5–7, 6–2 |
| 2R | (Kazakhstan) Yulia Putintseva | 43 | 6–4, 6–1 |
| 3R | (Poland) Magda Linette | 44 | 5–7, 6–2, 6–4 |
| 4R | (Czech Republic) Karolína Muchová (19) | 22 | 6–7^{(6–8)}, 4–6 |
**2022 Wimbledon Championships (4th)**
| Round | Opponent | Rank | Score |
| 1R | (United States) Louisa Chirico (Q) | 236 | 6–2, 6–1 |
| 2R | (Romania) Irina Bara | 122 | 6–3, 6–2 |
| 3R | (Czech Republic) Petra Kvitová (25) | 26 | 7–5, 7–6^{(7–4)} |
| 4R | (Romania) Simona Halep (16) | 18 | 1–6, 2–6 |
**2024 Wimbledon Championships (PR)**
| Round | Opponent | Rank | Score |
| 1R | (Czech Republic) Karolína Muchová | 34 | 6–3, 6–2 |
| 2R | (Czech Republic) Brenda Fruhvirtová | 88 | 6–4, 6–2 |
| 3R | Daria Kasatkina (12) | 14 | 7–6^{(8–6)}, 4–6, 6–4 |
| 4R | (Croatia) Donna Vekić | 37 | 2–6, 6–1, 4–6 |

**French Open**
**2021 French Open (33rd)**
| Round | Opponent | Rank | Score |
| 1R | (United States) Lauren Davis | 86 | 6–2, 7–6^{(7–3)} |
| 2R | (Montenegro) Danka Kovinić | 62 | 6–2, 6–0 |
| 3R | (Romania) Ana Bogdan | 102 | 2–6, 7–6^{(7–4)}, 6–4 |
| 4R | (Czech Republic) Markéta Vondroušová (20) | 21 | 6–4, 3–6, 6–2 |
| QF | (Slovenia) Tamara Zidanšek | 85 | 5–7, 6–4, 6–8 |

**US Open**
**2024 US Open (26th)**
| Round | Opponent | Rank | Score |
| 1R | (Switzerland) Viktorija Golubic | 73 | 6–0, 6–3 |
| 2R | (United States) Taylor Townsend | 48 | 6–3, 7–5 |
| 3R | (Romania) Elena-Gabriela Ruse (Q) | 122 | 4–6, 6–1, 7–6^{(10–8)} |
| 4R | (China) Wang Yafan | 80 | 6–1, 6–2 |
| QF | (United States) Emma Navarro (13) | 12 | 2–6, 5–7 |

== Wins against top 10 players ==
- Badosa has a 15–20 record against players who were, at the time the match was played, ranked in the top 10.

| Season | 2021 | 2022 | 2023 | 2024 | 2025 | 2026 | Total |
|---|---|---|---|---|---|---|---|
| Wins | 6 | 2 | 3 | 2 | 2 | 1 | 16 |

| No. | Player | Rk | Event | Surface | Rd | Score | Rk | Years | Ref |
|---|---|---|---|---|---|---|---|---|---|
| 1. | (Australia) Ashleigh Barty | 1 | Charleston Open, U.S. | Clay | QF | 6–4, 6–3 | 71 | 2021 | |
| 2. | (Poland) Iga Świątek | 8 | Tokyo Summer Olympics | Hard | 2R | 6–3, 7–6^{(7–4)} | 29 | 2021 | |
| 3. | (Belarus) Aryna Sabalenka | 3 | Cincinnati Open, U.S. | Hard | 2R | 5–7, 6–2, 7–6^{(7–4)} | 29 | 2021 | |
| 4. | (Czech Republic) Barbora Krejčíková | 5 | Indian Wells Open, U.S. | Hard | 4R | 6–1, 7–5 | 27 | 2021 | |
| 5. | (Belarus) Aryna Sabalenka | 2 | WTA Finals, Guadalajara | Hard | RR | 6–4, 6–0 | 10 | 2021 | |
| 6. | (Greece) Maria Sakkari | 6 | WTA Finals, Guadalajara | Hard | RR | 7–6^{(7–4)}, 6–4 | 10 | 2021 | |
| 7. | (Czech Republic) Barbora Krejčíková | 4 | Sydney International, Australia | Hard | F | 6–3, 4–6, 7–6^{(7–4)} | 9 | 2022 | |
| 8. | (Tunisia) Ons Jabeur | 10 | Stuttgart Open, Germany | Clay (i) | QF | 7–6^{(11–9)}, 1–6, 6–3 | 3 | 2022 | |
| 9. | Daria Kasatkina | 8 | Stuttgart Open, Germany | Clay (i) | 1R | 6–1, 6–1 | 31 | 2023 | |
| 10. | (United States) Coco Gauff | 6 | Madrid Open, Spain | Clay | 3R | 6–3, 6–0 | 42 | 2023 | |
| 11. | (Tunisia) Ons Jabeur | 7 | Italian Open, Italy | Clay | 2R | 6–1, 6–4 | 35 | 2023 | |
| 12. | (United States) Jessica Pegula | 3 | China Open, China | Hard | 4R | 6–4, 6–0 | 19 | 2024 | |
| 13. | (Brazil) Beatriz Haddad Maia | 10 | Ningbo Open, China | Hard | QF | 6–3, 6–2 | 15 | 2024 | |
| 14. | (United States) Coco Gauff | 3 | Australian Open, Australia | Hard | QF | 7–5, 6–4 | 12 | 2025 | |
| 15. | (United States) Emma Navarro | 9 | German Open, Germany | Grass | 2R | 7–6^{(7–2)}, 6–3 | 10 | 2025 | |
| 16. | (United States) Coco Gauff | 7 | German Open, Germany | Grass | 2R | 1–6, 6–3, 6–2 | 142 | 2026 | |

- Key: (Rk) first use, opponent rank; (Rd) round; (Rk) 2nd use, player rank; (Ref) reference; (F) final; (SF) semifinal; (QF) quarterfinal; (#R) rounds 4, 3, 2, 1; (RR) round-robin stage; (Q#) qualifying rounds or stages (3), 2, 1.

== Longest winning streaks ==
=== 9–match singles winning streak (2021) ===
| # | Tournament | Category | Start date | Surface | Rd | Opponent | Rank | Score |
|---|---|---|---|---|---|---|---|---|
| – | Madrid Open | WTA 1000 (Mandatory) | 26 April 2021 | Clay | SF | (Australia) Ashleigh Barty (1) | No. 1 | 4–6, 3–6 |
| 1 | Serbia Ladies Open | WTA 250 | 16 May 2021 | Clay | 1R | (Germany) Andrea Petkovic (PR) | No. 106 | 6–2, 6–3 |
| 2 | Serbia Ladies Open | WTA 250 | 16 May 2021 | Clay | 2R | (Romania) Mihaela Buzărnescu (PR) | No. 179 | 6–0, 6–4 |
| 3 | Serbia Ladies Open | WTA 250 | 16 May 2021 | Clay | QF | (Sweden) Rebecca Peterson (7) | No. 60 | 6–2, 6–4 |
| 4 | Serbia Ladies Open | WTA 250 | 16 May 2021 | Clay | SF | (Bulgaria) Viktoriya Tomova (LL) | No. 123 | 6–1, 6–2 |
| 5 | Serbia Ladies Open | WTA 250 | 16 May 2021 | Clay | F | (Croatia) Ana Konjuh (Q) | No. 188 | 6–2, 2–0 ret. |
| 6 | French Open | Grand Slam | 30 May 2021 | Clay | 1R | (United States) Lauren Davis | No. 86 | 6–2, 7–6^{(7–3)} |
| 7 | French Open | Grand Slam | 30 May 2021 | Clay | 2R | (Montenegro) Danka Kovinić | No. 62 | 6–2, 6–0 |
| 8 | French Open | Grand Slam | 30 May 2021 | Clay | 3R | (Romania) Ana Bogdan | No. 102 | 2–6, 7–6^{(7–4)}, 6–4 |
| 9 | French Open | Grand Slam | 30 May 2021 | Clay | 4R | (Czech Republic) Markéta Vondroušová (20) | No. 21 | 6–4, 3–6, 6–2 |
| – | French Open | Grand Slam | 30 May 2021 | Clay | QF | (Slovenia) Tamara Zidanšek | No. 85 | 5–7, 6–4, 6–8 |
