= 2018 Burnie International =

Tennis tournament

- Date: 29 January–4 February
- Edition: 15th (men); 9th (women)
- Category: ATP Challenger Tour (men); ITF Women's Circuit (women)
- Prize money: $75,000 / $60,000
- Surface: Hard
- Location: Burnie, Tasmania, Australia
- Venue: Burnie Tennis Club

Champions

Men's singles
- (France) Stéphane Robert

Women's singles
- (Ukraine) Marta Kostyuk

Men's doubles
- (Spain) Gerard Granollers / (Spain) Marcel Granollers

Women's doubles
- (United States) Vania King / (United Kingdom) Laura Robson
← 2017 ·	Burnie International	· 2019 →

The 2018 Caterpillar Burnie International was a professional tennis tournament played on outdoor hard courts as part of the 2018 ATP Challenger Tour and the 2018 ITF Women's Circuit, offering a total of $75,000 in prize money for men and $60,000 for women. It was the fifteenth (for men) and ninth (for women) edition of the tournament.

== Men's singles entrants ==
=== Seeds ===
Country	Player	Rank^{1}	Seed
ESP	Marcel Granollers	133	1
JPN	Yoshihito Nishioka	168	2
USA	Evan King	202	3
USA	Kevin King	214	4
FRA	Stéphane Robert	215	5
AUS	Andrew Whittington	227	6
AUS	Jason Kubler	243	7
USA	Christian Harrison	252	8

- ^{1} Rankings as of 15 January 2018.

=== Other entrants ===
The following players received wildcards into the singles main draw:

- (Australia) Harry Bourchier
- (Australia) Blake Ellis
- (Australia) Andrew Harris

The following players received entry from the qualifying draw:

- (Italy) Liam Caruana
- (Spain) Gerard Granollers
- (France) Gianni Mina
- (Australia) Luke Saville

The following players received entry as lucky losers:

- (India) Vijay Sundar Prashanth
- (Japan) Kaichi Uchida

== Women's singles entrants ==
=== Seeds ===
Country	Player	Rank^{1}	Seed
SUI	Viktorija Golubic	115	1
CZE	Barbora Krejčíková	128	2
SUI	Patty Schnyder	149	3
AUS	Olivia Rogowska	168	4
RUS	Irina Khromacheva	188	5
ROU	Alexandra Dulgheru	190	6
AUS	Destanee Aiava	193	7
GBR	Katie Boulter	196	8

- ^{1} Rankings as of 15 January 2018

=== Other entrants ===
The following players received wildcards into the singles main draw:

- (Australia) Zoe Hives
- (Australia) Olivia Tjandramulia
- (Australia) Sara Tomic

The following player received entry by a junior exempt:

- (Ukraine) Marta Kostyuk

The following players received entry from the qualifying draw:

- (United States) Jennifer Elie
- (Japan) Chihiro Muramatsu
- (Russia) Anastasia Pivovarova
- (China) Wang Xiyu

== Champions ==
=== Men's singles ===
- (France) Stéphane Robert def. (Germany) Daniel Altmaier 6–1, 6–2

=== Women's singles ===
- (Ukraine) Marta Kostyuk def. (Switzerland) Viktorija Golubic, 6–4, 6–3

=== Men's doubles ===
- (Spain) Gerard Granollers / (Spain) Marcel Granollers def. (United States) Evan King / (United States) Max Schnur 7–6^{(10–8)}, 6–2.

=== Women's doubles ===
- (United States) Vania King / (United Kingdom) Laura Robson def. (Japan) Momoko Kobori / (Japan) Chihiro Muramatsu, 7–6^{(7–3)}, 6–1
