= 2024 Ningbo Open =

- Date: 14–20 October
- Edition: 7th
- Category: WTA 500
- Draw: 28S / 16D
- Surface: Hard / outdoor
- Location: Ningbo, China
- Venue: Ningbo Yinzhou Tennis Center

Champions

Singles
- Daria Kasatkina

Doubles
- (Netherlands) Demi Schuurs / (China) Yuan Yue
- Ningbo Open

The 2024 Ningbo Open was a professional women's tennis tournament played on outdoor hardcourts. It was the 7th women's edition of the Ningbo International Tennis Open. It took place at the Yinzhou Tennis Center in Ningbo, China, from 14 to 20 October 2024. The tournament was originally scheduled to take place from 16 to 22 September as a WTA 250 tournament on the 2024 WTA Tour, but it was upgraded to a WTA 500 tournament and moved to October to fill the vacancy generated by the cancellation of the Zhengzhou Open.

== Champions ==
=== Singles ===
- Daria Kasatkina def. Mirra Andreeva, 6–0, 4–6, 6–4

=== Doubles ===
- (Netherlands) Demi Schuurs / (China) Yuan Yue def. (United States) Nicole Melichar-Martinez / (Australia) Ellen Perez 6–3, 6–3

== Singles main-draw entrants ==
=== Seeds ===
Country	Player	Rank^{1}	Seed
~~ITA~~	~~Jasmine Paolini~~	~~6~~	~~1~~
~~CHN~~	~~Zheng Qinwen~~	~~7~~	~~2~~
~~USA~~	~~Emma Navarro~~	~~8~~	~~3~~
CZE	Barbora Krejčíková	10	4
	Daria Kasatkina	11	5
BRA	Beatriz Haddad Maia	12	6
	Anna Kalinskaya	13	7
ESP	Paula Badosa	15	8

- ^{1} Rankings are as of 7 October 2024

=== Other entrants ===
The following players received wildcards into the singles main draw:

- (China) Wang Xiyu
- ~~(China) Wang Yafan~~

The following player received entry using a protected ranking:

- (Czech Republic) Karolína Muchová

The following players received entry from the qualifying draw:

- (Italy) Sara Errani
- (Australia) Olivia Gadecki
- (United States) Varvara Lepchenko
- Kamilla Rakhimova
- (Australia) Ajla Tomljanović
- (China) You Xiaodi

The following players received entry as lucky losers:

- (Hungary) Anna Bondár
- (Romania) Jaqueline Cristian
- (Australia) Priscilla Hon
- (Germany) Tamara Korpatsch
- (China) Ma Yexin
- (Germany) Ella Seidel
- (Liechtenstein) Kathinka von Deichmann

=== Withdrawals ===
- (United States) Danielle Collins → replaced by Mirra Andreeva
- (Ukraine) Marta Kostyuk → replaced by (United Kingdom) Katie Boulter
- (United States) Emma Navarro → replaced by (Germany) Tamara Korpatsch
- (Latvia) Jeļena Ostapenko → replaced by (Kazakhstan) Yulia Putintseva
- (Italy) Jasmine Paolini → replaced by (Germany) Ella Seidel
- (United States) Jessica Pegula → replaced by (Australia) Priscilla Hon
- (Greece) Maria Sakkari → replaced by (China) Ma Yexin
- Liudmila Samsonova → replaced by (Hungary) Anna Bondár
- (Croatia) Donna Vekić → replaced by (Czech Republic) Kateřina Siniaková
- (China) Wang Yafan → replaced by (Liechtenstein) Kathinka von Deichmann
- (China) Zheng Qinwen → replaced by (Romania) Jaqueline Cristian

== Doubles main-draw entrants ==
=== Seeds ===
Country	Player	Country	Player	Rank^{1}	Seed
USA	Nicole Melichar-Martinez	AUS	Ellen Perez	21	1
TPE	Chan Hao-ching	CZE	Barbora Krejčiková	45	2
KAZ	Anna Danilina		Irina Khromacheva	58	3
MEX	Giuliana Olmos		Alexandra Panova	67	4

- ^{1} Rankings are as of 7 October 2024

=== Other entrants ===
The following pair received entry as wildcards:

- (China) Yang Zhaoxuan / (China) Zhang Shuai
