= 2019 Burnie International – Men's doubles =

Men's doubles
- 2019 Burnie International

Final
- Champions: (South Africa) Lloyd Harris (Israel) Dudi Sela
- Runners-up: (Bosnia and Herzegovina) Mirza Bašić (Bosnia and Herzegovina) Tomislav Brkić
- Score: 6–3, 6–7^{(3–7)}, [10–8]

Events
Singles	men	women
Doubles	men	women
← 2018 ·	Burnie International	· 2020 →

Gerard and Marcel Granollers were the defending champions but chose not to defend their title.

Lloyd Harris and Dudi Sela won the title after defeating Mirza Bašić and Tomislav Brkić 6–3, 6–7^{(3–7)}, [10–8] in the final.

== Seeds ==
1. (Australia) Max Purcell / (Australia) Luke Saville (semifinals)
2. (India) Jeevan Nedunchezhiyan / (Netherlands) Sem Verbeek (quarterfinals)
3. (Uruguay) Ariel Behar / (Spain) Enrique López Pérez (quarterfinals)
4. (Thailand) Sanchai Ratiwatana / (Thailand) Sonchat Ratiwatana (first round)

== Draw ==
=== Key ===
- Q = Qualifier
- WC = Wild card
- LL = Lucky loser
- Alt = Alternate
- SE = Special exempt
- PR = Protected ranking
- ITF = ITF entry
- JE = Junior exempt
- w/o = Walkover
- r = Retired
- d = Defaulted
- SR = Special ranking

First round
1	(Australia) M Purcell (Australia) L Saville	7	6
(Australia) M Polmans (Australia) M Reid	5	4
WC	(Australia) M Banes (Australia) H Bourchier	6	6^{3}	[10]
WC	(Australia) Jacob Grills (Australia) A Vukic	1	7^{7}	[5]
3	(Uruguay) A Behar (Spain) E López Pérez	6	6
ITF	(Canada) S Diez (Russia) A Zhurbin	3	3
(Croatia) T Draganja (Chinese Taipei) T-h Yang	3	5
PR	(South Africa) L Harris (Israel) D Sela	6	7
(China) Z Li (Japan) G Soeda	5	6^{2}
WC	(Australia) A Harris (Australia) A Santillan	7	7^{7}
ITF	(United States) JP Fruttero (Spain) D Pérez Sanz	7	7^{7}
4	(Thailand) Sa Ratiwatana (Thailand) So Ratiwatana	5	6^{3}
(Bosnia and Herzegovina) M Bašić (Bosnia and Herzegovina) T Brkić	2	6	[10]
(Spain) P Martínez (Australia) B Mousley	6	3	[7]
(Japan) H Moriya (Egypt) M Safwat	6	2	[9]
2	(India) J Nedunchezhiyan (Netherlands) S Verbeek	3	6	[11]

Quarterfinals
1	(Australia) M Purcell (Australia) L Saville	6	6
WC	(Australia) M Banes (Australia) H Bourchier	4	3
3	(Uruguay) A Behar (Spain) E López Pérez	3	5
PR	(South Africa) L Harris (Israel) D Sela	6	7
WC	(Australia) A Harris (Australia) A Santillan	5	6	[9]
ITF	(United States) JP Fruttero (Spain) D Pérez Sanz	7	3	[11]
(Bosnia and Herzegovina) M Bašić (Bosnia and Herzegovina) T Brkić	6	6^{4}	[10]
2	(India) J Nedunchezhiyan (Netherlands) S Verbeek	4	7^{7}	[6]

Semifinals
1	(Australia) M Purcell (Australia) L Saville	6^{2}	6^{4}
PR	(South Africa) L Harris (Israel) D Sela	7^{7}	7^{7}
ITF	(United States) JP Fruttero (Spain) D Perez Sanz	5	2
(Bosnia and Herzegovina) M Bašić (Bosnia and Herzegovina) T Brkić	7	6

Final
PR	(South Africa) L Harris (Israel) D Sela	6	6^{3}	[10]
(Bosnia and Herzegovina) M Bašić (Bosnia and Herzegovina) T Brkić	3	7^{7}	[8]
