= 2019 Burnie International – Women's doubles =

Women's doubles
- 2019 Burnie International

Final
- Champions: (Australia) Ellen Perez (Australia) Arina Rodionova
- Runners-up: (Russia) Irina Khromacheva (Belgium) Maryna Zanevska
- Score: 6–4, 6–3

Events
Singles	men	women
Doubles	men	women
← 2018 ·	Burnie International	· 2020 →

Vania King and Laura Robson were the defending champions, but neither player chose to participate.

Ellen Perez and Arina Rodionova won the title, defeating Irina Khromacheva and Maryna Zanevska in the final, 6–4, 6–3.

== Seeds ==
1. (United States) Asia Muhammad / (Hungary) Fanny Stollár (withdrew)
2. (Russia) Irina Khromacheva / (Belgium) Maryna Zanevska (final)
3. (Australia) Ellen Perez / (Australia) Arina Rodionova (champions)
4. (Romania) Irina Bara / (Georgia (country)) Ekaterine Gorgodze (first round)

== Draw ==
=== Key ===
- Q = Qualifier
- WC = Wild card
- LL = Lucky loser
- Alt = Alternate
- SE = Special exempt
- PR = Protected ranking
- ITF = ITF entry
- JE = Junior exempt
- w/o = Walkover
- r = Retired
- d = Defaulted
- SR = Special ranking

=== Draw ===
First round
Alt	(Australia) G Da Silva-Fick (Australia) T Patterson	5	3
(Spain) P Badosa Gibert (Ukraine) M Kostyuk	7	6
(Japan) K Okamura (United Kingdom) G Taylor	6	6
(Australia) A Bozovic (Australia) A Parnaby	4	3
3	(Australia) E Perez (Australia) Ar Rodionova	7^{7}	6
Alt	(Australia) I Bozicevic (Australia) M Jovanovic	6^{5}	0
(Australia) L Cabrera (Australia) J Fourlis	6	6^{5}	[9]
(Spain) G García Pérez (Kazakhstan) E Rybakina	4	7^{7}	[11]
(Chinese Taipei) K-c Chang (Chinese Taipei) C-w Hsu	6	6
(Australia) D Aiava (Australia) N Bains	4	4
(Argentina) N Podoroska (China) Xiy Wang	6^{8}	6	[10]
4	(Romania) I Bara (Georgia (country)) E Gorgodze	7^{10}	3	[1]
(Australia) A Bai (Australia) I Wallace	2	0
(Australia) M Inglis (Australia) K McPhee	6	6
(Australia) A Myers (Australia) B Woolcock	6^{4}	6	[7]
2	(Russia) I Khromacheva (Belgium) M Zanevska	7^{7}	3	[10]

Quarterfinals
(Spain) P Badosa Gibert (Ukraine) M Kostyuk	6	6
(Japan) K Okamura (United Kingdom) G Taylor	2	3
3	(Australia) E Perez (Australia) Ar Rodionova	3	6	[10]
(Spain) G García Pérez (Kazakhstan) E Rybakina	6	3	[5]
(Chinese Taipei) K-c Chang (Chinese Taipei) C-w Hsu	2	2
(Argentina) N Podoroska (China) Xiy Wang	6	6
(Australia) M Inglis (Australia) K McPhee	4	2
2	(Russia) I Khromacheva (Belgium) M Zanevska	6	6

Semifinals
(Spain) P Badosa Gibert (Ukraine) M Kostyuk	6	0	[6]
3	(Australia) E Perez (Australia) Ar Rodionova	3	6	[10]
(Argentina) N Podoroska (China) Xiy Wang	2	4
2	(Russia) I Khromacheva (Belgium) M Zanevska	6	6

Final
3	(Australia) E Perez (Australia) Ar Rodionova	6	6
2	(Russia) I Khromacheva (Belgium) M Zanevska	4	3
