= 2018 Burnie International – Women's singles =

Women's singles
- 2018 Burnie International

Final
- Champion: (Ukraine) Marta Kostyuk
- Runner-up: (Switzerland) Viktorija Golubic
- Score: 6–4, 6–3

Events
Singles	men	women
Doubles	men	women
← 2017 ·	Burnie International	· 2019 →

Asia Muhammad was the defending champion, but lost to Myrtille Georges in the first round.

Marta Kostyuk won the title, defeating Viktorija Golubic in the final, 6–4, 6–3.

== Seeds ==
1. (Switzerland) Viktorija Golubic (final)
2. (Czech Republic) Barbora Krejčíková (first round)
3. (Switzerland) Patty Schnyder (first round)
4. (Australia) Olivia Rogowska (semifinals)
5. (Russia) Irina Khromacheva (first round)
6. (Romania) Alexandra Dulgheru (quarterfinals)
7. (Australia) Destanee Aiava (quarterfinals)
8. (United Kingdom) Katie Boulter (first round)

== Draw ==
=== Key ===
- Q = Qualifier
- WC = Wild card
- LL = Lucky loser
- Alt = Alternate
- SE = Special exempt
- PR = Protected ranking
- ITF = ITF entry
- JE = Junior exempt
- w/o = Walkover
- r = Retired
- d = Defaulted
- SR = Special ranking

=== Finals ===
Semifinals
1	(Switzerland) Viktorija Golubic	6^{3}	6	6
4	(Australia) Olivia Rogowska	7^{7}	0	2
WC	(Australia) Zoe Hives	6	2	2
JE	(Ukraine) Marta Kostyuk	4	6	6

Final
1	(Switzerland) Viktorija Golubic	4	3
JE	(Ukraine) Marta Kostyuk	6	6

=== Top half ===
First round
1	(Switzerland) V Golubic	6	6
Q	(Japan) C Muramatsu	3	2
(Japan) E Sema	6^{3}	5
(France) A Lim	7^{7}	7
Q	(Russia) A Pivovarova	0	2
(Russia) V Savinykh	6	6
WC	(Australia) S Tomic	1	3
6	(Romania) A Dulgheru	6	6
4	(Australia) O Rogowska	6	6
(Croatia) T Mrdeža	2	1
(Australia) E Perez	6	4	6
WC	(Australia) O Tjandramulia	1	6	4
(Australia) J Fourlis	6	6
(Thailand) V Wongteanchai	1	4
(Papua New Guinea) A Tere-Apisah	3	6	4
7	(Australia) D Aiava	6	4	6

Second round
1	(Switzerland) V Golubic	7	6
(France) A Lim	5	0
(Russia) V Savinykh	3	1
6	(Romania) A Dulgheru	6	6
4	(Australia) O Rogowska	7^{7}	6
(Australia) E Perez	6^{1}	3
(Australia) J Fourlis	6^{4}	7^{10}	6^{8}
7	(Australia) D Aiava	7^{7}	6^{8}	7^{10}

Quarterfinals
1	(Switzerland) V Golubic	6	6
6	(Romania) A Dulgheru	3	3
4	(Australia) O Rogowska	6	6
7	(Australia) D Aiava	2	3

Semifinals
1	(Switzerland) V Golubic	6^{3}	6	6
4	(Australia) O Rogowska	7^{7}	0	2

=== Bottom half ===
First round
8	(United Kingdom) K Boulter	6	3	6^{5}
(Romania) J Cristian	2	6	7^{7}
(France) M Georges	6	1	6
(United States) A Muhammad	3	6	1
(Japan) M Inoue	6^{3}	6	6
(United Kingdom) K Dunne	7^{7}	3	1
WC	(Australia) Z Hives	6	6
3	(Switzerland) P Schnyder	1	2
5	(Russia) I Khromacheva	3	5
JE	(Ukraine) M Kostyuk	6	7
Q	(United States) J Elie	7	4	7^{12}
(United Kingdom) L Robson	5	6	6^{10}
(Japan) M Minokoshi	2	6	5
(France) J Ponchet	6	4	7
Q	(China) Xiy Wang	6	3	7
2	(Czech Republic) B Krejčíková	3	6	5

Second round
(Romania) J Cristian	6	6
(France) M Georges	3	4
(Japan) M Inoue	1	4
WC	(Australia) Z Hives	6	6
JE	(Ukraine) M Kostyuk	3	7	7
Q	(United States) J Elie	6	5	5
(France) J Ponchet	3	4
Q	(China) Xiy Wang	6	6

Quarterfinals
(Romania) J Cristian	4	4
WC	(Australia) Z Hives	6	6
JE	(Ukraine) M Kostyuk	6	6
Q	(China) Xiy Wang	1	1

Semifinals
WC	(Australia) Z Hives	6	2	2
JE	(Ukraine) M Kostyuk	4	6	6
