= 2018 Burnie International – Women's doubles =

Women's doubles
- 2018 Burnie International

Final
- Champions: (United States) Vania King (United Kingdom) Laura Robson
- Runners-up: (Japan) Momoko Kobori (Japan) Chihiro Muramatsu
- Score: 7–6^{(7–3)}, 6–1

Events
Singles	men	women
Doubles	men	women
← 2017 ·	Burnie International	· 2019 →

Riko Sawayanagi and Barbora Štefková were the defending champions, but both players chose not to participate.

Vania King and Laura Robson won the title, defeating Momoko Kobori and Chihiro Muramatsu in the final, 7–6^{(7–3)}, 6–1.

== Seeds ==
1. (Czech Republic) Barbora Krejčíková / (Serbia) Nina Stojanović (semifinals)
2. (Russia) Irina Khromacheva / (United States) Asia Muhammad (quarterfinals)
3. (United States) Vania King / (United Kingdom) Laura Robson (champions)
4. (Australia) Jessica Moore / (Australia) Ellen Perez (semifinals)

== Draw ==
=== Key ===
- Q = Qualifier
- WC = Wild card
- LL = Lucky loser
- Alt = Alternate
- SE = Special exempt
- PR = Protected ranking
- ITF = ITF entry
- JE = Junior exempt
- w/o = Walkover
- r = Retired
- d = Defaulted
- SR = Special ranking

=== Draw ===
First round
1	(Czech Republic) B Krejčíková (Serbia) N Stojanović	6	6
(Romania) J Cristian (Russia) V Savinykh	2	2
(Australia) A Bai (Thailand) V Wongteanchai	5	6	[2]
WC	(Australia) D Aiava (Australia) B Woolcock	7	2	[10]
3	(United States) V King (United Kingdom) L Robson	6	6
WC	(Australia) K Birrell (Australia) J Fourlis	3	0
(Croatia) T Mrdeža (Japan) K Takahata	1	2
(Russia) A Pivovarova (France) J Ponchet	6	6
(United Kingdom) K Dunne (Australia) O Rogowska	2	4
(Japan) M Inoue (Japan) E Sema	6	6
WC	(Australia) A Parnaby (Australia) A Smith	2	3
4	(Australia) J Moore (Australia) E Perez	6	6
(Japan) M Kobori (Japan) C Muramatsu	6	6
Q	(Australia) Z Hives (Papua New Guinea) A Tere-Apisah	0	3
Q	(Japan) M Eguchi (Japan) M Minokoshi	2	4
2	(Russia) I Khromacheva (United States) A Muhammad	6	6

Quarterfinals
1	(Czech Republic) B Krejčíková (Serbia) N Stojanović	6	6
WC	(Australia) D Aiava (Australia) B Woolcock	4	4
3	(United States) V King (United Kingdom) L Robson	7	6
(Russia) A Pivovarova (France) J Ponchet	5	0
(Japan) M Inoue (Japan) E Sema	5	6	[8]
4	(Australia) J Moore (Australia) E Perez	7	4	[10]
(Japan) M Kobori (Japan) C Muramatsu	4	6	[10]
2	(Russia) I Khromacheva (United States) A Muhammad	6	2	[8]

Semifinals
1	(Czech Republic) B Krejčíková (Serbia) N Stojanović	3	6	[7]
3	(United States) V King (United Kingdom) L Robson	6	2	[10]
4	(Australia) J Moore (Australia) E Perez	2	6	[5]
(Japan) M Kobori (Japan) C Muramatsu	6	4	[10]

Final
3	(United States) V King (United Kingdom) L Robson	7^{7}	6
(Japan) M Kobori (Japan) C Muramatsu	6^{3}	1
