= 2018 Burnie International – Men's singles =

Tennis contest held in Burnie

Men's singles
- 2018 Burnie International

Final
- Champion: (France) Stéphane Robert
- Runner-up: (Germany) Daniel Altmaier
- Score: 6–1, 6–2

Events
Singles	men	women
Doubles	men	women
- Burnie International

Omar Jasika was the defending champion but withdrew before the tournament began.

Stéphane Robert won the title after defeating Daniel Altmaier 6–1, 6–2 in the final.

== Seeds ==
1. (Spain) Marcel Granollers (quarterfinals)
2. (Japan) Yoshihito Nishioka (semifinals)
3. (United States) Evan King (quarterfinals)
4. (United States) Kevin King (second round)
5. (France) Stéphane Robert (champion)
6. (Australia) Andrew Whittington (quarterfinals)
7. (Australia) Jason Kubler (semifinals)
8. (United States) Christian Harrison (second round)

== Draw ==
Key

- Q = Qualifier
- WC = Wild card
- LL = Lucky loser
- Alt = Alternate
- ITF = ITF entry
- PR = Protected ranking
- SR = Special ranking
- SE = Special exempt
- JE = Junior exempt
- JR = Junior Accelerator Programme entrant
- CO = College Accelerator Programme entrant
- NG = Next Gen Accelerator Program entrant
- w/o = Walkover
- r = Retired
- d = Defaulted

=== Finals ===
Semifinals
7	(Australia) Jason Kubler	3	6	2
(Germany) Daniel Altmaier	6	2	6
5	(France) Stéphane Robert	6	3	6
2	(Japan) Yoshihito Nishioka	3	6	4

Final
(Germany) Daniel Altmaier	1	2
5	(France) Stéphane Robert	6	6

=== Top half ===
First round
1	(Spain) M Granollers	7^{7}	7^{7}
(Australia) D Kelly	6^{5}	6^{0}
Q	(Spain) G Granollers	4	7^{7}	7^{7}
(Serbia) D Petrović	6	6^{3}	6^{3}
(Australia) M Polmans	4	6	6
LL	(Japan) K Uchida	6	1	2
(Belgium) K Coppejans	1	2
7	(Australia) J Kubler	6	6
4	(United States) K King	7^{8}	6
(Chinese Taipei) T-h Yang	6^{6}	4
(United States) A Sarkissian	7	6^{5}	0
(Japan) Y Takahashi	5	7^{7}	6
(Germany) D Altmaier	6	3	7^{7}
(Australia) M Banes	4	6	6^{5}
(Australia) B Mousley	1	5
8	(United States) C Harrison	6	7

Second round
1	(Spain) M Granollers	6	6
Q	(Spain) G Granollers	3	4
(Australia) M Polmans	4	2
7	(Australia) J Kubler	6	6
4	(United States) K King	4	6	2
(Japan) Y Takahashi	6	2	6
(Germany) D Altmaier	6	6
8	(United States) C Harrison	0	4

Quarterfinals
1	(Spain) M Granollers	6	6^{3}	4
7	(Australia) J Kubler	3	7^{7}	6
(Japan) Y Takahashi	6^{5}	3
(Germany) D Altmaier	7^{7}	6

Semifinals
7	(Australia) J Kubler	3	6	2
(Germany) D Altmaier	6	2	6

=== Bottom half ===
First round
5	(France) S Robert	4	7	6
Q	(Italy) L Caruana	6	5	4
WC	(Australia) A Harris	3	6	3
WC	(Australia) H Bourchier	6	3	6
(Canada) S Diez	6	3
Q	(France) G Mina	4	1^{r}
WC	(Australia) B Ellis	6^{3}	3
3	(United States) E King	7^{7}	6
6	(Australia) A Whittington	6^{5}	7^{7}	6
(United Kingdom) B Klein	7^{7}	6^{4}	2
(Australia) M Purcell	2	4
Q	(Australia) L Saville	6	6
(China) Z Li	7	6
(Germany) S Fanselow	5	4
LL	(India) VS Prashanth	1	1
2	(Japan) Y Nishioka	6	6

Second round
5	(France) S Robert	7	7
WC	(Australia) H Bourchier	5	5
(Canada) S Diez	4	4
3	(United States) E King	6	6
6	(Australia) A Whittington	2	7^{9}	6
Q	(Australia) L Saville	6	6^{7}	1
(China) Z Li	7^{7}	1	3
2	(Japan) Y Nishioka	6^{2}	6	6

Quarterfinals
5	(France) S Robert	6	6
3	(United States) E King	1	4
6	(Australia) A Whittington	6	2	3
2	(Japan) Y Nishioka	2	6	6

Semifinals
5	(France) S Robert	6	3	6
2	(Japan) Y Nishioka	3	6	4
