= 2024 Ningbo Open – Doubles =

Doubles
- 2024 Ningbo Open

Final
- Champions: (Netherlands) Demi Schuurs (China) Yuan Yue
- Runners-up: (United States) Nicole Melichar-Martinez (Australia) Ellen Perez
- Score: 6–3, 6–3

Events
Singles	Doubles
- Ningbo Open

Demi Schuurs and Yuan Yue defeated Nicole Melichar-Martinez and Ellen Perez in the final, 6–3, 6–3 to win the doubles tennis title at the 2024 Ningbo Open.

Laura Siegemund and Vera Zvonareva were the reigning champions, but Zvonareva did not participate this year and Siegemund chose to compete in Osaka instead.

== Seeds ==
1. (United States) Nicole Melichar-Martinez / (Australia) Ellen Perez (final)
2. (Chinese Taipei) Chan Hao-ching / (Czech Republic) Barbora Krejčíková (quarterfinals, withdrew)
3. (Kazakhstan) Anna Danilina / Irina Khromacheva (withdrew)
4. (Mexico) Giuliana Olmos / Alexandra Panova (semifinals)

== Draw ==
Key

- Q = Qualifier
- WC = Wild card
- LL = Lucky loser
- Alt = Alternate
- ITF = ITF entry
- PR = Protected ranking
- SR = Special ranking
- SE = Special exempt
- JE = Junior exempt
- JR = Junior Accelerator Programme entrant
- CO = College Accelerator Programme entrant
- NG = Next Gen Accelerator Program entrant
- w/o = Walkover
- r = Retired
- d = Defaulted

=== Draw ===
First round
1	(United States) N Melichar-Martinez (Australia) E Perez	3	7^{7}	[10]
(Slovakia) T Mihalíková (United Kingdom) O Nicholls	6	6^{3}	[7]
(Hungary) A Bondár (Belgium) K Zimmermann	3	2
(Norway) U Eikeri (Chinese Taipei) F-h Wu	6	6
4	(Mexico) G Olmos; A Panova	7^{7}	6
A Potapova; Y Sizikova	6^{1}	2
E Alexandrova (Czech Republic) K Siniaková
(Philippines) A Eala (Chinese Taipei) E-s Liang	w/o
WC	(China) Z Yang (China) S Zhang	7^{7}	2	[10]
(China) H Guo (China) X Jiang	6^{3}	6	[6]
(Indonesia) A Sutjiadi (China) Y Xu	w/o
3	(Kazakhstan) A Danilina; I Khromacheva
(Netherlands) D Schuurs (China) Y Yuan	6	6
(Germany) E Seidel (Liechtenstein) K von Deichmann	1	2
(Australia) O Gadecki; K Rakhimova	4	2
2	(Chinese Taipei) H-c Chan (Czech Republic) B Krejčíková	6	6

Quarterfinals
1	(United States) N Melichar-Martinez (Australia) E Perez	6	6
(Norway) U Eikeri (Chinese Taipei) F-h Wu	0	4
4	(Mexico) G Olmos; A Panova	6	6
(Philippines) A Eala (Chinese Taipei) E-s Liang	1	2
WC	(China) Z Yang (China) S Zhang	4	4
(Indonesia) A Sutjiadi (China) Y Xu	6	6
(Netherlands) D Schuurs (China) Y Yuan	w/o
2	(Chinese Taipei) H-c Chan (Czech Republic) B Krejčíková

Semifinals
1	(United States) N Melichar-Martinez (Australia) E Perez	6	7^{7}
4	(Mexico) G Olmos; A Panova	3	6^{3}
(Indonesia) A Sutjiadi (China) Y Xu	2	0
(Netherlands) D Schuurs (China) Y Yuan	6	6

Final
1	(United States) N Melichar-Martinez (Australia) E Perez	3	3
(Netherlands) D Schuurs (China) Y Yuan	6	6
