= 2019 Burnie International – Men's singles =

Tennis contest held in Burnie

Men's singles
- 2019 Burnie International

Final
- Champion: (Canada) Steven Diez
- Runner-up: (Australia) Maverick Banes
- Score: 7–5, 6–1

Events
Singles	men	women
Doubles	men	women
- Burnie International

Stéphane Robert was the defending champion but lost in the quarterfinals to Maverick Banes.

Steven Diez won the title after defeating Banes 7–5, 6–1 in the final.

== Seeds ==
All seeds receive a bye into the second round.

1. (Bosnia and Herzegovina) Mirza Bašić (third round)
2. (South Africa) Lloyd Harris (second round)
3. (Spain) Pedro Martínez (second round)
4. (Australia) Marc Polmans (third round)
5. (Poland) Kamil Majchrzak (semifinals)
6. (Austria) Sebastian Ofner (second round)
7. (Japan) Hiroki Moriya (second round)
8. (Egypt) Mohamed Safwat (third round)
9. (France) Stéphane Robert (quarterfinals)
10. (Italy) Stefano Napolitano (quarterfinals)
11. (Italy) Federico Gaio (second round)
12. (Japan) Go Soeda (third round)
13. (Italy) Lorenzo Giustino (third round)
14. (Italy) Gian Marco Moroni (second round)
15. (Brazil) Guilherme Clezar (second round)
16. (United Kingdom) Jay Clarke (semifinals)

== Draw ==
Key

- Q = Qualifier
- WC = Wild card
- LL = Lucky loser
- Alt = Alternate
- ITF = ITF entry
- PR = Protected ranking
- SR = Special ranking
- SE = Special exempt
- JE = Junior exempt
- JR = Junior Accelerator Programme entrant
- CO = College Accelerator Programme entrant
- NG = Next Gen Accelerator Program entrant
- w/o = Walkover
- r = Retired
- d = Defaulted

=== Finals ===
Quarterfinals
16	(United Kingdom) Jay Clarke	4	6	6
10	(Italy) Stefano Napolitano	6	4	3
WC	(Australia) Harry Bourchier	2	2
ITF	(Canada) Steven Diez	6	6
5	(Poland) Kamil Majchrzak	6	6
(Germany) Sebastian Fanselow	1	2
9	(France) Stéphane Robert	6	3	4
(Australia) Maverick Banes	4	6	6

Semifinals
16	(United Kingdom) Jay Clarke	4	4
ITF	(Canada) Steven Diez	6	6
5	(Poland) Kamil Majchrzak	7^{8}	6^{3}	3
(Australia) Maverick Banes	6^{6}	7^{7}	6

Final
ITF	(Canada) Steven Diez	7	6
(Australia) Maverick Banes	5	1

=== Top half ===
==== Section 1 ====
First round
Q	(France) S Doumbia	5	2
WC	(Australia) L Saville	7	6
(Bosnia and Herzegovina) T Brkić	3	2
Alt	(Italy) A Bega	6	6
(Australia) A Santillan	4	6^{5}
(Spain) N Kuhn	6	7^{7}
(Australia) M Purcell	6	6
ITF	(Spain) D Pérez Sanz	2	2

Second round
1	(Bosnia and Herzegovina) M Bašić	3	7	6
WC	(Australia) L Saville	6	5	3
Alt	(Italy) A Bega	1	4
16	(United Kingdom) J Clarke	6	6
10	(Italy) S Napolitano	6	6
(Spain) N Kuhn	1	1
(Australia) M Purcell	7^{7}	6
6	(Austria) S Ofner	6^{3}	2

Third round
1	(Bosnia and Herzegovina) M Bašić	1	3
16	(United Kingdom) J Clarke	6	6
10	(Italy) S Napolitano	6	7^{7}
(Australia) M Purcell	4	6^{3}

Quarterfinals
16	(United Kingdom) J Clarke	4	6	6
10	(Italy) S Napolitano	6	4	3

==== Section 2 ====
First round
WC	(Australia) H Bourchier	7^{7}	3
Alt	(Finland) H Heliövaara	6^{5}	2^{r}
ITF	(Spain) J Samper Montaña	5	1
(South Korea) Y-s Chung	7	6
PR	(Germany) D Altmaier	6	3	1
ITF	(Canada) S Diez	1	6	6
WC	(Australia) Jacob Grills	6	6
(Spain) E López Pérez	2	1

Second round
3	(Spain) P Martínez	3	6	5
WC	(Australia) H Bourchier	6	1	7
(South Korea) Y-s Chung	2	3
13	(Italy) L Giustino	6	6
11	(Italy) F Gaio	6	1	4
ITF	(Canada) S Diez	3	6	6
WC	(Australia) J Grills	4	2
8	(Egypt) M Safwat	6	6

Third round
WC	(Australia) H Bourchier	7^{16}	7^{7}
13	(Italy) L Giustino	6^{14}	6^{5}
ITF	(Canada) S Diez	6	6
8	(Egypt) M Safwat	1	3

Quarterfinals
WC	(Australia) H Bourchier	2	2
ITF	(Canada) S Diez	6	6

=== Bottom half ===
==== Section 3 ====
First round
(France) T Lamasine	7^{7}	2	1
(Israel) D Sela	6^{5}	6	6
(China) D Wu	6^{8}	6^{4}
WC	(Australia) C O'Connell	7^{10}	7^{7}
(Germany) S Fanselow	6	6
(Chinese Taipei) T-h Yang	4	3
(Australia) J Duckworth	6	6
WC	(Australia) A Vukic	2	3

Second round
5	(Poland) K Majchrzak	6	4	6
(Israel) D Sela	3	6	1
WC	(Australia) C O'Connell	4	2
12	(Japan) G Soeda	6	6
14	(Italy) GM Moroni	6	4	2
(Germany) S Fanselow	4	6	6
(Australia) J Duckworth	4	6	4
4	(Australia) M Polmans	6	3	6

Third round
5	(Poland) K Majchrzak	7	6
12	(Japan) G Soeda	5	2
(Germany) S Fanselow	3	6	7^{7}
4	(Australia) M Polmans	6	4	6^{2}

Quarterfinals
5	(Poland) K Majchrzak	6	6
(Germany) S Fanselow	1	2

==== Section 4 ====
First round
(China) Z Li	7	6^{4}	6
Alt	(Australia) A Harris	5	7^{7}	3
ITF	(Russia) A Zhurbin	6	6
Alt	(Australia) D Kelly	4	4
Alt	(Australia) B Mousley	6^{11}	1^{r}
Q	(Australia) J Beale	7^{13}	3
(Australia) M Banes	3	6	7^{8}
(Turkey) C İlkel	6	3	6^{6}

Second round
7	(Japan) H Moriya	3	4
(China) Z Li	6	6
ITF	(Russia) A Zhurbin	2	6	3
9	(France) S Robert	6	4	6
15	(Brazil) G Clezar	2	4
Q	(Australia) J Beale	6	6
(Australia) M Banes	6	7
2	(South Africa) L Harris	4	5

Third round
(China) Z Li	6^{8}	3
9	(France) S Robert	7^{10}	6
Q	(Australia) J Beale	6	2	0^{r}
(Australia) M Banes	3	6	2

Quarterfinals
9	(France) S Robert	6	3	4
(Australia) M Banes	4	6	6
