= 2019 Burnie International =

- Date: 21–27 January 2019
- Edition: 16th (men); 10th (women)
- Category: ATP Challenger Tour (Challenger 80); ITF Women's World Tennis Tour (W60)
- Prize money: $54,160 (ATP) $60,000 (ITF)
- Surface: Hard
- Location: Burnie, Australia

Champions

Men's singles
- (Canada) Steven Diez

Women's singles
- (Australia) Belinda Woolcock

Men's doubles
- (South Africa) Lloyd Harris / (Israel) Dudi Sela

Women's doubles
- (Australia) Ellen Perez / (Australia) Arina Rodionova
- Burnie International

The 2019 Burnie International was a professional tennis tournament played on hard courts. It was the sixteenth (men) and tenth (women) editions of the tournament which was part of the 2019 ATP Challenger Tour and the 2019 ITF Women's World Tennis Tour. It took place in Burnie, Australia between 21 and 27 January 2019.

== Men's singles main-draw entrants ==
=== Seeds ===
Country	Player	Rank^{1}	Seed
BIH	Mirza Bašić	99	1
RSA	Lloyd Harris	119	2
ESP	Pedro Martínez	165	3
AUS	Marc Polmans	169	4
POL	Kamil Majchrzak	176	5
AUT	Sebastian Ofner	180	6
JPN	Hiroki Moriya	185	7
EGY	Mohamed Safwat	186	8
FRA	Stéphane Robert	197	9
ITA	Stefano Napolitano	198	10
ITA	Federico Gaio	209	11
JPN	Go Soeda	211	12
ITA	Lorenzo Giustino	222	13
ITA	Gian Marco Moroni	226	14
BRA	Guilherme Clezar	234	15
GBR	Jay Clarke	236	16

- ^{1} Rankings are as of 14 January 2019.

=== Other entrants ===
The following players received wildcards into the singles main draw:

- (Australia) Harry Bourchier
- (Australia) Jacob Grills
- (Australia) Christopher O'Connell
- (Australia) Luke Saville
- (Australia) Aleksandar Vukic

The following player received entry into the singles main draw using a protected ranking:

- (Germany) Daniel Altmaier

The following players received entry into the singles main draw as alternates:

- (Italy) Alessandro Bega
- (Australia) Andrew Harris
- (Finland) Harri Heliövaara
- (Australia) Dayne Kelly
- (Australia) Bradley Mousley

The following players received entry into the singles main draw using their ITF World Tennis Ranking:

- (Canada) Steven Diez
- (Spain) David Pérez Sanz
- (Spain) Jordi Samper Montaña
- (Russia) Alexander Zhurbin

The following players received entry from the qualifying draw:

- (Australia) Jeremy Beale
- (France) Sadio Doumbia

== Women's singles main-draw entrants ==
=== Seeds ===
Country	Player	Rank^{1}	Seed
ESP	Sara Sorribes Tormo	81	1
JPN	Nao Hibino	115	2
UKR	Marta Kostyuk	116	3
HUN	Fanny Stollár	124	4
RUS	Irina Khromacheva	135	5
ESP	Paula Badosa Gibert	141	6
ESP	Georgina García Pérez	143	7
BUL	Viktoriya Tomova	151	8

- ^{1} Rankings are as of 14 January 2019.

=== Other entrants ===
The following players received wildcards into the singles main draw:

- (Australia) Destanee Aiava
- (Australia) Naiktha Bains
- (Australia) Lizette Cabrera
- (Australia) Zoe Hives

The following players received entry from the qualifying draw:

- (Australia) Alison Bai
- (Chinese Taipei) Chang Kai-chen
- (Australia) Gabriella Da Silva-Fick
- (United States) Jennifer Elie
- (Argentina) Nadia Podoroska
- (Australia) Belinda Woolcock

== Champions ==
=== Men's singles ===
- (Canada) Steven Diez def. (Australia) Maverick Banes, 7–5, 6–1

=== Women's singles ===
- (Australia) Belinda Woolcock def. (Spain) Paula Badosa Gibert, 7–6^{(7–3)}, 7–6^{(7–4)}

=== Men's doubles ===
- (South Africa) Lloyd Harris / (Israel) Dudi Sela def. (Bosnia and Herzegovina) Mirza Bašić / (Bosnia and Herzegovina) Tomislav Brkić 6–3, 6–7^{(3–7)}, [10–8].

=== Women's doubles ===
- (Australia) Ellen Perez / (Australia) Arina Rodionova def. (Russia) Irina Khromacheva / (Belgium) Maryna Zanevska, 6–4, 6–3
