= 2018 Burnie International – Men's doubles =

Men's doubles
- 2018 Burnie International

Final
- Champions: (Spain) Gerard Granollers (Spain) Marcel Granollers
- Runners-up: (United States) Evan King (United States) Max Schnur
- Score: 7–6^{(10–8)}, 6–2

Events
Singles	men	women
Doubles	men	women
- Burnie International

Brydan Klein and Dane Propoggia are the defending champions but chose to defend their title with different partners. Klein partnered Bradley Mousley and lost in the semifinals to Gerard and Marcel Granollers. Propoggia partnered Vijay Sundar Prashanth but lost in the first round to Andrew Harris and Luke Saville.

Granollers and Granollers won the title after defeating Evan King and Max Schnur 7–6^{(10–8)}, 6–2 in the final.

== Seeds ==
1. (Australia) Steven de Waard / (Australia) Marc Polmans (quarterfinals)
2. (United Kingdom) Brydan Klein / (Australia) Bradley Mousley (semifinals)
3. (Spain) Gerard Granollers / (Spain) Marcel Granollers (champions)
4. (Australia) Max Purcell / (Australia) Andrew Whittington (semifinals)

== Draw ==
Key

- Q = Qualifier
- WC = Wild card
- LL = Lucky loser
- Alt = Alternate
- ITF = ITF entry
- PR = Protected ranking
- SR = Special ranking
- SE = Special exempt
- JE = Junior exempt
- JR = Junior Accelerator Programme entrant
- CO = College Accelerator Programme entrant
- NG = Next Gen Accelerator Program entrant
- w/o = Walkover
- r = Retired
- d = Defaulted

First round
1	(Australia) S de Waard (Australia) M Polmans	7	5	[10]
(United States) S Bangoura (United States) N Pasha	5	7	[6]
(Australia) M Banes (Australia) J Kubler	1	4
(United States) E King (United States) M Schnur	6	6
4	(Australia) M Purcell (Australia) A Whittington	6	7^{7}
PR	(United States) K King (South Africa) D O'Brien	1	6^{5}
(China) Z Li (France) S Robert	4	6	[10]
Alt	(Australia) Jacob Grills (Australia) B Mitchell	6	1	[4]
(Japan) T Niki (Japan) Y Takahashi	6	4	[10]
WC	(Australia) B Ellis (Australia) Gavin van Peperzeel	3	6	[6]
(United States) N Lammons (United States) A Lawson	4	4
3	(Spain) G Granollers (Spain) M Granollers	6	6
(India) VS Prashanth (Australia) D Propoggia	5	6^{3}
WC	(Australia) A Harris (Australia) L Saville	7	7^{7}
(Serbia) D Petrović (United States) A Sarkissian	3	4
2	(United Kingdom) B Klein (Australia) B Mousley	6	6

Quarterfinals
1	(Australia) S de Waard (Australia) M Polmans	6	6^{4}	[7]
(United States) E King (United States) M Schnur	4	7^{7}	[10]
4	(Australia) M Purcell (Australia) A Whittington	2	6	[10]
(China) Z Li (France) S Robert	6	3	[8]
(Japan) T Niki (Japan) Y Takahashi	1	6	[6]
3	(Spain) G Granollers (Spain) M Granollers	6	0	[10]
WC	(Australia) A Harris (Australia) L Saville	7^{7}	5	[8]
2	(United Kingdom) B Klein (Australia) B Mousley	6^{5}	7	[10]

Semifinals
(United States) E King (United States) M Schnur	6	6
4	(Australia) M Purcell (Australia) A Whittington	4	4
3	(Spain) G Granollers (Spain) M Granollers	6	6
2	(United Kingdom) B Klein (Australia) B Mousley	2	2

Final
(United States) E King (United States) M Schnur	6^{8}	2
3	(Spain) G Granollers (Spain) M Granollers	7^{10}	6
