= 2024 Ningbo Open – Singles =

Women's tennis tournament

Singles
- 2024 Ningbo Open

Final
- Champion: Daria Kasatkina
- Runner-up: Mirra Andreeva
- Score: 6–0, 4–6, 6–4

Details
- Draw: 28
- Seeds: 8

Events
Singles	Doubles
- Ningbo Open

Daria Kasatkina defeated Mirra Andreeva in the final, 6–0, 4–6, 6–4 to win the singles tennis title at the 2024 Ningbo Open. It was her eighth WTA Tour singles title, and she saved two match points en route (in her quarterfinal match against Yulia Putintseva).

Ons Jabeur was the reigning champion, but did not participate due to injury.

== Seeds ==
The top four seeds received a bye into the second round.

1. (Italy) Jasmine Paolini (withdrew)
2. (China) Zheng Qinwen (withdrew)
3. (United States) Emma Navarro (withdrew)
4. (Czech Republic) Barbora Krejčíková (quarterfinals, retired)
5. Daria Kasatkina (champion)
6. (Brazil) Beatriz Haddad Maia (quarterfinals)
7. Anna Kalinskaya (quarterfinals)
8. (Spain) Paula Badosa (semifinals, retired)

== Draw ==
Key

- Q = Qualifier
- WC = Wild card
- LL = Lucky loser
- Alt = Alternate
- ITF = ITF entry
- PR = Protected ranking
- SR = Special ranking
- SE = Special exempt
- JE = Junior exempt
- JR = Junior Accelerator Programme entrant
- CO = College Accelerator Programme entrant
- NG = Next Gen Accelerator Program entrant
- w/o = Walkover
- r = Retired
- d = Defaulted

=== Finals ===
Semifinals
8	(Spain) Paula Badosa	4	0^{r}
5	Daria Kasatkina	6	0
Mirra Andreeva	6	1
PR	(Czech Republic) Karolína Muchová	2	0^{r}

Final
5	Daria Kasatkina	6	4	6
Mirra Andreeva	0	6	4

=== Top half ===
First round
(United Kingdom) K Boulter	6	6
Q	(Italy) S Errani	3	2
WC	(China) Xiy Wang	6	6
Q	K Rakhimova	2	0
D Shnaider	6	3	3
8	(Spain) P Badosa	4	6	6
(Czech Republic) K Siniaková	6	6
(Poland) M Linette	2	4
(United States) C Dolehide	2	0
(Kazakhstan) Y Putintseva	6	6
LL	(Liechtenstein) K von Deichmann	3	1
LL	(Germany) E Seidel	6	6

Second round
6	(Brazil) B Haddad Maia	7^{7}	7
(United Kingdom) K Boulter	6^{2}	5
WC	(China) Xiy Wang	7^{7}	1	2
8	(Spain) P Badosa	6^{4}	6	6
5	D Kasatkina	1	6	6
(Czech Republic) K Siniaková	6	3	2
(Kazakhstan) Y Putintseva	6	6
LL	(Germany) E Seidel	4	4

Quarterfinals
6	(Brazil) B Haddad Maia	3	2
8	(Spain) P Badosa	6	6
5	D Kasatkina	6	1	7^{8}
(Kazakhstan) Y Putintseva	4	6	6^{6}

Semifinals
8	(Spain) P Badosa	4	0^{r}
5	D Kasatkina	6	0

=== Bottom half ===
First round
LL	(Germany) T Korpatsch	6^{4}	7^{8}	6
LL	(Hungary) A Bondár	7^{7}	6^{6}	4
M Andreeva	6	6
Q	(United States) V Lepchenko	2	0
LL	(China) Y Ma	6	6
Q	(China) X You	2	2
7	A Kalinskaya	3	6	6
LL	(Australia) P Hon	6	3	4
(China) Y Yuan	6	6
Q	(Australia) A Tomljanović	4	2
PR	(Czech Republic) K Muchová	6	7
Q	(Australia) O Gadecki	3	5

Second round
LL	(Germany) T Korpatsch	0	4
M Andreeva	6	6
LL	(China) Y Ma	6^{5}	3
4	(Czech Republic) B Krejčíková	7^{7}	6
7	A Kalinskaya	6	6
(China) Y Yuan	3	3
PR	(Czech Republic) K Muchová	6	6
LL	(Romania) J Cristian	2	1

Quarterfinals
M Andreeva	7^{7}	3
4	(Czech Republic) B Krejčíková	6^{5}	2^{r}
7	A Kalinskaya	6	2	3
PR	(Czech Republic) K Muchová	2	6	6

Semifinals
M Andreeva	6	1
PR	(Czech Republic) K Muchová	2	0^{r}

== Qualifying ==
=== Seeds ===
1. Kamilla Rakhimova (qualified)
2. (Romania) Jaqueline Cristian (first round, lucky loser)
3. (Ukraine) Yuliia Starodubtseva (first round)
4. (Australia) Olivia Gadecki (qualified)
5. (Australia) Ajla Tomljanović (qualified)
6. (Italy) Sara Errani (qualified)
7. (Hungary) Anna Bondár (qualifying competition, lucky loser)
8. (Germany) Ella Seidel (qualifying competition, lucky loser)
9. (Germany) Tamara Korpatsch (qualifying competition, lucky loser)
10. (China) Wei Sijia (first round)
11. (Philippines) Alexandra Eala (first round)
12. (United States) Varvara Lepchenko (qualified)

=== Qualifiers ===
1. Kamilla Rakhimova
2. (United States) Varvara Lepchenko
3. (China) You Xiaodi
4. (Australia) Olivia Gadecki
5. (Australia) Ajla Tomljanović
6. (Italy) Sara Errani

=== Lucky losers ===
1. (Hungary) Anna Bondár
2. (Germany) Tamara Korpatsch
3. (Germany) Ella Seidel
4. (Liechtenstein) Kathinka von Deichmann
5. (Australia) Priscilla Hon
6. (China) Ma Yexin
7. (Romania) Jaqueline Cristian

=== Qualifying draw ===
==== First qualifier ====
First round
1	Kamilla Rakhimova	4	7^{7}	6
Tatiana Prozorova	6	6^{1}	0
(Chinese Taipei) Liang En-shuo	4	6	5
9	(Germany) Tamara Korpatsch	6	1	7

Qualifying competition
1	Kamilla Rakhimova	6	6
9	(Germany) Tamara Korpatsch	0	3

==== Second qualifier ====
First round
2	(Romania) Jaqueline Cristian	6	3	4
(Liechtenstein) Kathinka von Deichmann	3	6	6
WC	(China) Lu Jiajing	4	1
12	(United States) Varvara Lepchenko	6	6

Qualifying competition
(Liechtenstein) Kathinka von Deichmann	3	2
12	(United States) Varvara Lepchenko	6	6

==== Third qualifier ====
First round
3	(Ukraine) Yuliia Starodubtseva	6^{6}	6^{5}
WC	(China) You Xiaodi	7^{8}	7^{7}
(Australia) Priscilla Hon	6	6
11	(Philippines) Alexandra Eala	4	3

Qualifying competition
WC	(China) You Xiaodi	6	6
(Australia) Priscilla Hon	0	3

==== Fourth qualifier ====
First round
4	(Australia) Olivia Gadecki	6	6
WC	(China) Zhang Shuai	2	4
WC	(China) Yao Xinxin	7^{7}	3	2
7	(Hungary) Anna Bondár	6^{4}	6	6

Qualifying competition
4	(Australia) Olivia Gadecki	6	6
7	(Hungary) Anna Bondár	2	3

==== Fifth qualifier ====
First round
5	(Australia) Ajla Tomljanović	6	6
(Canada) Carol Zhao	2	0
(China) Shi Han	4	6^{2}
8	(Germany) Ella Seidel	6	7^{7}

Qualifying competition
5	(Australia) Ajla Tomljanović	6	6
8	(Germany) Ella Seidel	1	2

==== Sixth qualifier ====
First round
6	(Italy) Sara Errani	7	6
(China) Gao Xinyu	5	1
(China) Ma Yexin	7	0	6
10	(China) Wei Sijia	5	6	3

Qualifying competition
6	(Italy) Sara Errani	6	4	6
(China) Ma Yexin	0	6	4
