= Demi Schuurs =

Dutch tennis player (born 1993)

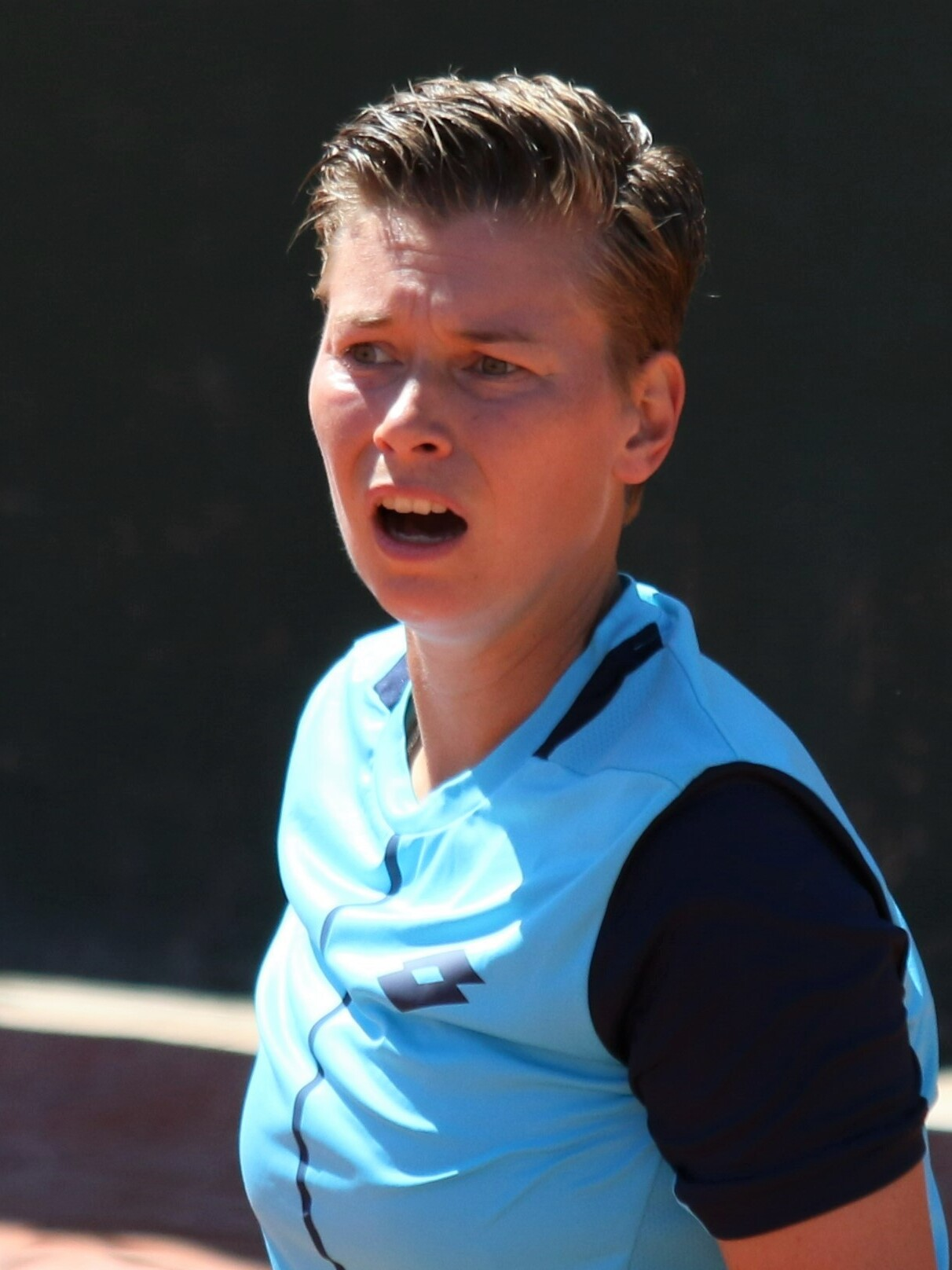
- Schuurs at the 2022 French Open
- Country (sports): Netherlands
- Residence: Maastricht, Netherlands
- Born: 1 August 1993 (age 33) Sittard, Netherlands
- Height: 1.70 m (5 ft 7 in)
- Turned pro: 2009
- Plays: Right (two-handed backhand)
- Prize money: $3,731,400
- Official website: demischuurs.nl

Singles
- Career record: 61–53
- Career titles: 0
- Highest ranking: No. 512 (23 February 2015)

Doubles
- Career record: 442–261
- Career titles: 21
- Highest ranking: No. 7 (22 October 2018)
- Current ranking: No. 23 (29 June 2026)

Grand Slam doubles results
- Australian Open: SF (2021)
- French Open: QF (2026)
- Wimbledon: QF (2019, 2026)
- US Open: QF (2018, 2020, 2022, 2024, 2025)

Other doubles tournaments
- Tour Finals: SF (2019, 2021, 2022)
- Olympic Games: 2R (2021)

Grand Slam mixed doubles results
- Australian Open: 2R (2018, 2019, 2023, 2024, 2025, 2026)
- French Open: SF (2021)
- Wimbledon: QF (2018)
- US Open: QF (2021, 2023)

Other mixed doubles tournaments
- Olympic Games: SF (2024)

Team competitions
- Fed Cup: 11–5
- Last updated on: 3 July 2026.

Demi Schuurs (pronounced [ˈdeːmi sxyrs]; born 1 August 1993) is a Dutch professional tennis player who specializes in doubles. On 22 October 2018, she peaked at No. 7 in the doubles rankings. In February 2015, she reached a career-high singles ranking of world No. 512.

She has won twenty-one doubles titles on the WTA Tour, as well as one singles title and 20 doubles titles on the ITF Circuit.

== Career ==
=== Juniors ===
Schuurs won the junior events of the doubles tournaments at 2011 Australian Open and 2011 US Open.

=== Professional ===
==== 2018–2020: Four WTA 1000 titles, world No. 7, WTA Finals debut & semifinal ====
She qualified for the 2018 WTA Finals doubles event, partnering Elise Mertens where she reached the quarterfinals. (Note: To obtain data from this reference, select the corresponding year on the WTA or ITF website.)

==== 2021–2022: Fourth WTA Finals with fourth different partner and two times semifinalist ====
She qualified for the 2021 WTA Finals with Nicole Melichar and reached the semifinals for a second time.

In 2022, she also qualified for her fourth WTA Finals in a row with a fourth different partner, Desirae Krawczyk. The pair reached the semifinals, making it the third time for Schuurs.

==== 2023: WTA Tour singles debut, fifth WTA Finals ====
Without a singles ranking she qualified at the Guadalajara Open for her first singles main draw at a tour–level on her eighth WTA singles qualifying attempt, getting her first singles ranking in the top 1000 since 2016.

She qualified for the 2023 WTA Finals with Desirae Krawczyk for a fifth year in a row that the tournament was played and for the second time with the same partner.

==== 2024–2025: Partnership with Muhammad, 20th title at Indian Wells ====
Schuurs' first competition of the season was representing the Netherlands in the United Cup, a mixed team competition in Perth, Australia. Although the team's performance was not good, being eliminated in the group stage, Schuurs won both mixed doubles matches she played.

Still on the Australian swing, Schuurs participated in the Adelaide International in partnership with Asia Muhammad. They reached the quarterfinals. Next, she entered the Australian Open with a new partner, the Brazilian Luisa Stefani, and they reached the quarterfinals. Continuing her campaign on hardcourts, now in the Middle East, Schuurs and Stefani competed at the Qatar Ladies Open where they won the title without losing a single set.

In October 2024, Schuurs teamed up with Yuan Yue to win the doubles at the Ningbo Open, defeating top seeds Nicole Melichar-Martinez and Ellen Perez in the final.

Schuurs reached three times the round of 16, at the 2025 Australian Open, in Doha, and in Dubai with partner Muhammad. Again with Muhammad, she reached the final at Indian Wells by defeating top seeds world No. 1, Kateřina Siniaková, and world No. 2, Taylor Townsend. They won the title defeating the Slovak-British duo of Tereza Mihalikova and Olivia Nicholls.

== Personal life ==
Schuurs is a daughter of former Dutch international handball player Lambert Schuurs. Her younger brother Perr is a professional football (soccer) player.

During an interview with the WTA in 2020, Schuurs revealed that she is in a relationship with a woman named Carmen.

== Performance timeline ==
Key
W	F	SF	QF	#R	RR	Q#	P#	DNQ	A	Z#	PO	G	S	B	NMS	NTI	P	NH

(W) winner; (F) finalist; (SF) semifinalist; (QF) quarterfinalist; (#R) rounds 4, 3, 2, 1; (RR) round-robin stage; (Q#) qualification round; (P#) preliminary round; (DNQ) did not qualify; (A) absent; (Z#) Davis/Fed Cup Zonal Group (with number indication) or (PO) play-off; (G) gold, (S) silver or (B) bronze Olympic/Paralympic medal; (NMS) not a Masters tournament; (NTI) not a Tier I tournament; (P) postponed; (NH) not held; (SR) strike rate (events won / competed); (W–L) win–loss record.
To avoid confusion and double counting, these charts are updated at the conclusion of a tournament or when the player's participation has ended.

=== Doubles ===
Tournament	2015	2016	2017	2018	2019	2020	2021	2022	2023	2024	2025	SR	W–L	Win%
Grand Slam tournaments
Australian Open	A	1R	1R	1R	1R	2R	SF	A	QF	QF	3R	0 / 9	13–9	59%
French Open	A	A	1R	1R	2R	3R	3R	2R	3R	A	3R	0 / 8	10–8	56%
Wimbledon	A	1R	3R	3R	QF	NH	1R	2R	2R	1R	2R	0 / 9	10–9	53%
US Open	1R	A	2R	QF	2R	QF	1R	QF	2R	QF	QF	0 / 10	18–10	64%
Win–loss	0–1	0–2	3–4	5–4	5–4	6–3	6–4	5–3	7–3	6–3	8–4	0 / 36	51–36	59%
Year-end championships
WTA Finals	DNQ			QF	SF	NH	SF	SF	RR	DNQ	RR	0 / 6	6–13	32%
National representation
Summer Olympics	NH	A	NH				A	NH		1R	NH	0 / 1	0–1	0%
WTA 1000
Qatar Open	A	A	A	2R	NMS	1R	NMS	1R	NMS	W	2R	1 / 5	7–4	64%
Dubai	A	A	A	NMS	QF	NMS	QF	NMS	SF	1R	2R	0 / 5	6–5	55%
Indian Wells Open	A	A	A	2R	1R	NH	2R	2R	2R	QF	W	0 / 7	11–6	65%
Miami Open	A	A	1R	SF	2R	NH	1R	2R	1R	1R	1R	0 / 8	5–8	38%
Madrid Open	A	A	A	A	QF	NH	F	F	1R	2R	1R	0 / 6	11–6	65%
Italian Open	A	A	A	W	F	2R	2R	SF	SF	1R	QF	1 / 8	15–7	68%
Canadian Open	A	A	A	W	F	NH	2R	QF	F	1R	1R	1 / 7	15–6	71%
Cincinnati Open	A	A	1R	F	F	W	QF	SF	QF	QF	2R	1 / 9	21–8	72%
Guadalajara Open	NH							2R	A	NMS		0 / 1	1–1	50%
Wuhan Open	A	A	1R	W	SF	NH				1R	1R	1 / 5	7–4	64%
China Open	A	A	2R	SF	QF	NH			1R	1R	2R	0 / 6	6–6	50%
Career statistics
Year-end ranking	N/A	71	45	8	14	12	11	17	19	24	21			

== Significant finals ==
=== WTA 1000 tournaments ===
==== Doubles: 13 (6 titles, 7 runner-ups) ====
Result	Year	Tournament	Surface	Partner	Opponents	Score
Win	2018	Italian Open	Clay	(Australia) Ashleigh Barty	(Czech Republic) Andrea Sestini Hlaváčková (Czech Republic) Barbora Strýcová	6–3, 6–4
Win	2018	Canadian Open	Hard	(Australia) Ashleigh Barty	(Chinese Taipei) Latisha Chan (Russia) Ekaterina Makarova	4–6, 6–3, [10–8]
Loss	2018	Cincinnati Open	Hard	(Belgium) Elise Mertens	(Czech Republic) Lucie Hradecká (Russia) Ekaterina Makarova	2–6, 5–7
Win	2018	Wuhan Open	Hard	(Belgium) Elise Mertens	(Czech Republic) Andrea Sestini Hlaváčková (Czech Republic) Barbora Strýcová	6–3, 6–3
Loss	2019	Italian Open	Clay	(Germany) Anna-Lena Grönefeld	(Belarus) Victoria Azarenka (Australia) Ashleigh Barty	6–4, 0–6, [3–10]
Loss	2019	Canadian Open	Hard	(Germany) Anna-Lena Grönefeld	(Czech Republic) Barbora Krejčíková (Czech Republic) Kateřina Siniaková	5–7, 0–6
Loss	2019	Cincinnati Open	Hard	(Germany) Anna-Lena Grönefeld	(Czech Republic) Lucie Hradecká (Slovenia) Andreja Klepač	4–6, 1–6
Win	2020	Cincinnati Open	Hard	(Czech Republic) Květa Peschke	(United States) Nicole Melichar (China) Xu Yifan	6–1, 4–6, [10–4]
Loss	2021	Madrid Open	Clay	(Canada) Gabriela Dabrowski	(Czech Republic) Barbora Krejčíková (Czech Republic) Kateřina Siniaková	4–6, 3–6
Loss	2022	Madrid Open	Clay	(United States) Desirae Krawczyk	(Canada) Gabriela Dabrowski (Mexico) Giuliana Olmos	6–7^{(1–7)}, 7–5, [7–10]
Loss	2023	Canadian Open	Hard	(United States) Desirae Krawczyk	(Japan) Shuko Aoyama (Japan) Ena Shibahara	4–6, 6–4, [11–13]
Win	2024	Qatar Open	Hard	(Brazil) Luisa Stefani	(United States) Caroline Dolehide (United States) Desirae Krawczyk	6–4, 6–2
Win	2025	Indian Wells Open	Hard	(United States) Asia Muhammad	(Slovakia) Tereza Mihalíková (United Kingdom) Olivia Nicholls	6–2, 7–6^{(7–4)}

=== Olympic Games medal matches ===
==== Mixed doubles: 1 (4th place) ====
Result	Year	Tournament	Surface	Partner	Opponents	Score
4th place	2024	Paris Olympics	Clay	(Netherlands) Wesley Koolhof	(Canada) Gabriela Dabrowski (Canada) Félix Auger-Aliassime	3–6, 6–7^{(2–7)}

== WTA Tour finals ==
=== Doubles: 38 (21 titles, 17 runner-ups) ===
Legend WTA 1000 (Premier M / 5) 6–7 WTA 500 (Premier) 8–6 WTA 250 (International) 7–4	Finals by surface Hard (11–7) Clay (7–4) Grass (3–6)	Finals by setting Outdoor (17–17) Indoor (4–0)

Result	W–L	Date	Tournament	Tier	Surface	Partner	Opponents	Score
Win	1–0	Apr 2015	Katowice Open, Poland	International	Hard (i)	(Belgium) Ysaline Bonaventure	(Italy) Gioia Barbieri (Italy) Karin Knapp	7–5, 4–6, [10–6]
Win	2–0	Jul 2015	Bucharest Open, Romania	International	Clay	(Georgia (country)) Oksana Kalashnikova	(Romania) Andreea Mitu (Romania) Patricia Maria Țig	6–2, 6–2
Loss	2–1	Oct 2016	Tashkent Open, Uzbekistan	International	Hard	(Czech Republic) Renata Voráčová	(Romania) Raluca Olaru (Turkey) İpek Soylu	5–7, 3–6
Loss	2–2	Jan 2017	Auckland Open, New Zealand	International	Hard	(Czech Republic) Renata Voráčová	(Netherlands) Kiki Bertens (Sweden) Johanna Larsson	2–6, 2–6
Loss	2–3	Jun 2017	Rosmalen Open, Netherlands	International	Grass	(Netherlands) Kiki Bertens	(Slovakia) Dominika Cibulková (Belgium) Kirsten Flipkens	6–4, 4–6, [6–10]
Loss	2–4	Jul 2017	Bucharest Open, Romania	International	Clay	(Belgium) Elise Mertens	(Romania) Irina Camelia Begu (Romania) Raluca Olaru	3–6, 3–6
Win	3–4	Sep 2017	Guangzhou Open, China	International	Hard	(Belgium) Elise Mertens	(Australia) Monique Adamczak (Australia) Storm Sanders	6–2, 6–3
Win	4–4	Jan 2018	Brisbane International, Australia	Premier	Hard	(Netherlands) Kiki Bertens	(Slovenia) Andreja Klepač (Spain) María José Martínez Sánchez	7–5, 6–2
Win	5–4	Jan 2018	Hobart International, Australia	International	Hard	(Belgium) Elise Mertens	(Ukraine) Lyudmyla Kichenok (Japan) Makoto Ninomiya	6–2, 6–2
Win	6–4	May 2018	Italian Open, Italy	Premier 5	Clay	(Australia) Ashleigh Barty	(Czech Republic) Andrea Sestini Hlaváčková (Czech Republic) Barbora Strýcová	6–3, 6–4
Win	7–4	May 2018	Nuremberg Cup, Germany	International	Clay	(Slovenia) Katarina Srebotnik	(Belgium) Kirsten Flipkens (Sweden) Johanna Larsson	3–6, 6–3, [10–7]
Win	8–4	Jun 2018	Rosmalen Open, Netherlands	International	Grass	(Belgium) Elise Mertens	(Netherlands) Kiki Bertens (Belgium) Kirsten Flipkens	3–3 ret.
Loss	8–5	Jun 2018	Birmingham Classic, UK	Premier	Grass	(Belgium) Elise Mertens	(Hungary) Tímea Babos (France) Kristina Mladenovic	6–4, 3–6, [8–10]
Win	9–5	Aug 2018	Canadian Open, Canada	Premier 5	Hard	(Australia) Ashleigh Barty	(Chinese Taipei) Latisha Chan (Russia) Ekaterina Makarova	4–6, 6–3, [10–8]
Loss	9–6	Aug 2018	Cincinnati Open, US	Premier 5	Hard	(Belgium) Elise Mertens	(Czech Republic) Lucie Hradecká (Russia) Ekaterina Makarova	2–6, 5–7
Win	10–6	Sep 2018	Wuhan Open, China	Premier 5	Hard	(Belgium) Elise Mertens	(Czech Republic) Andrea Sestini Hlaváčková (Czech Republic) Barbora Strýcová	6–3, 6–3
Loss	10–7	Feb 2019	Qatar Ladies Open	Premier	Hard	(Germany) Anna-Lena Grönefeld	(Chinese Taipei) Chan Hao-ching (Chinese Taipei) Latisha Chan	1–6, 6–3, [6–10]
Loss	10–8	May 2019	Italian Open, Italy	Premier 5	Clay	(Germany) Anna-Lena Grönefeld	(Belarus) Victoria Azarenka (Australia) Ashleigh Barty	6–4, 0–6, [3–10]
Loss	10–9	Jun 2019	Birmingham Classic, UK	Premier	Grass	(Germany) Anna-Lena Grönefeld	(Chinese Taipei) Hsieh Su-wei (Czech Republic) Barbora Strýcová	4–6, 7–6^{(4)}, [8–10]
Loss	10–10	Aug 2019	Canadian Open, Canada	Premier 5	Hard	(Germany) Anna-Lena Grönefeld	(Czech Republic) Barbora Krejčíková (Czech Republic) Kateřina Siniaková	5–7, 0–6
Loss	10–11	Aug 2019	Cincinnati Open, US	Premier 5	Hard	(Germany) Anna-Lena Grönefeld	(Czech Republic) Lucie Hradecká (Slovenia) Andreja Klepač	4–6, 1–6
Win	11–11	Aug 2020	Cincinnati Open, US	Premier 5	Hard	(Czech Republic) Květa Peschke	(United States) Nicole Melichar (China) Xu Yifan	6–1, 4–6, [10–4]
Win	12–11	Sep 2020	Internationaux de Strasbourg, France	International	Clay	(United States) Nicole Melichar	(United States) Hayley Carter (Brazil) Luisa Stefani	6–4, 6–3
Win	13–11	Mar 2021	Qatar Ladies Open	WTA 500	Hard	(United States) Nicole Melichar	(Romania) Monica Niculescu (Latvia) Jeļena Ostapenko	6–2, 2–6, [10–8]
Win	14–11	Apr 2021	Charleston Open, US	WTA 500	Clay (green)	(United States) Nicole Melichar	(Czech Republic) Marie Bouzková (Czech Republic) Lucie Hradecká	6–2, 6–4
Loss	14–12	May 2021	Madrid Open, Spain	WTA 1000	Clay	(Canada) Gabriela Dabrowski	(Czech Republic) Barbora Krejčíková (Czech Republic) Kateřina Siniaková	4–6, 3–6
Loss	14–13	Jun 2021	Berlin Open, Germany	WTA 500	Grass	(United States) Nicole Melichar	(Belarus) Victoria Azarenka (Belarus) Aryna Sabalenka	6–4, 5–7, [4–10]
Loss	14–14	Jun 2021	Eastbourne International, UK	WTA 500	Grass	(United States) Nicole Melichar	(Japan) Shuko Aoyama (Japan) Ena Shibahara	1–6, 4–6
Win	15–14	Apr 2022	Stuttgart Open, Germany	WTA 500	Clay (i)	(United States) Desirae Krawczyk	(United States) Coco Gauff (China) Zhang Shuai	6–3, 6–4
Loss	15–15	May 2022	Madrid Open, Spain	WTA 1000	Clay	(United States) Desirae Krawczyk	(Canada) Gabriela Dabrowski (Mexico) Giuliana Olmos	6–7^{(1)}, 7–5, [7–10]
Win	16–15	Apr 2023	Stuttgart Open, Germany (2)	WTA 500	Clay (i)	(United States) Desirae Krawczyk	(United States) Nicole Melichar-Martinez (Mexico) Giuliana Olmos	6–4, 6–1
Win	17–15	Jun 2023	Eastbourne International, UK	WTA 500	Grass	(United States) Desirae Krawczyk	(United States) Nicole Melichar-Martinez (Australia) Ellen Perez	6–2, 6–4
Loss	17–16	Aug 2023	Canadian Open, Canada	WTA 1000	Hard	(United States) Desirae Krawczyk	(Japan) Shuko Aoyama (Japan) Ena Shibahara	4–6, 6–4, [11–13]
Win	18–16	Feb 2024	Qatar Ladies Open (2)	WTA 1000	Hard	(Brazil) Luisa Stefani	(United States) Caroline Dolehide (United States) Desirae Krawczyk	6–4, 6–2
Win	19–16	Oct 2024	Ningbo Open, China	WTA 500	Hard	(China) Yuan Yue	(United States) Nicole Melichar-Martinez (Australia) Ellen Perez	6–3, 6–3
Win	20–16	Mar 2025	Indian Wells Open, US	WTA 1000	Hard	(United States) Asia Muhammad	(Slovakia) Tereza Mihalíková (United Kingdom) Olivia Nicholls	6–2, 7–6^{(4)}
Win	21–16	Jun 2025	Queen's Club Championships, UK	WTA 500	Grass	(United States) Asia Muhammad	(Kazakhstan) Anna Danilina (Russia) Diana Shnaider	7–5, 6–7^{(3)}, [10–4]
Loss	21–17	Jun 2026	Bad Homburg Open, Germany	WTA 500	Grass	(Australia) Ellen Perez	Vera Zvonareva (Indonesia) Aldila Sutjiadi	1–6, 6–4, [5–10]

== ITF Circuit finals ==
=== Singles (1–1) ===
Legend $25,000 tournaments $10,000 tournaments (1–1)	Finals by surface Hard (1–0) Clay (0–1)

Result	W–L	Date	Tournament	Surface	Opponent	Score
Loss	0–1	Oct 2012	ITF Antalya, Turkey	Clay	(Ukraine) Olga Ianchuk	6–2, 2–6, 6–3
Win	1–1	Feb 2014	ITF Sharm El Sheikh, Egypt	Hard	(United Kingdom) Emily Webley-Smith	6–4, 6–2

=== Doubles (20–7) ===
Legend $100,000 tournaments (1–0) $75,000 tournaments (1–0) $50,000 tournaments (1–1) $25,000 tournaments (9–3) $15,000 tournaments (1–1) $10,000 tournaments (7–2)	Finals by surface Hard (5–1) Clay (15–5) Grass (0–1)

Result	No.	Date	Tournament	Surface	Partner	Opponents	Score
Loss	1.	Jul 2009	ITF Bree, Belgium	Clay	(Belgium) An-Sophie Mestach	(Netherlands) Kiki Bertens (Netherlands) Quirine Lemoine	1–6, 0–6
Win	1.	Jul 2010	ITF Bree, Belgium	Clay	(Belgium) Sofie Oyen	(Netherlands) Marcella Koek (Russia) Marina Melnikova	6–0, 6–1
Win	2.	Aug 2010	ITF Westende, Belgium	Hard	(Netherlands) Quirine Lemoine	(Belgium) Alison Van Uytvanck (Russia) Irina Khromacheva	3–6, 6–4, [10–4]
Win	3.	Mar 2011	ITF Antalya, Turkey	Clay	(Belarus) Ilona Kremen	(Bulgaria) Martina Gledacheva (Bulgaria) Isabella Shinikova	3–6, 7–6^{(3)}, [10–8]
Win	4.	Apr 2012	ITF Tessenderlo, Belgium	Clay	(Ukraine) Maryna Zanevska	(Germany) Tatjana Maria (Liechtenstein) Stephanie Vogt	6–4, 6–3
Win	5.	Jul 2013	ITF Aschaffenburg, Germany	Clay	(Netherlands) Eva Wacanno	(Germany) Carolin Daniels (Germany) Laura Schaeder	7–5, 1–6, [14–12]
Win	6.	Jul 2013	ITF Maaseik, Belgium	Clay	(Netherlands) Eva Wacanno	(Netherlands) Bernice van de Velde (Netherlands) Kelly Versteeg	6–2, 4–6, [10–7]
Win	7.	Aug 2013	ITF Rotterdam, Netherlands	Clay	(France) Amandine Hesse	(Belgium) Elke Lemmens (Belarus) Sviatlana Pirazhenka	3–6, 7–5, [10–4]
Loss	2.	Sep 2013	ITF Alphen a/d Rijn, Netherlands	Clay	(Netherlands) Eva Wacanno	(Netherlands) Cindy Burger (Chile) Daniela Seguel	4–6, 1–6
Win	8.	Nov 2013	ITF Bol, Croatia	Clay	(Czech Republic) Barbora Krejčíková	(Slovakia) Vivien Juhászová (Czech Republic) Tereza Malíková	6–2, 6–4
Win	9.	Dec 2013	ITF Madrid, Spain	Hard	(Netherlands) Eva Wacanno	(Bulgaria) Elitsa Kostova (Russia) Evgeniya Rodina	6–1, 6–2
Loss	3.	Feb 2014	ITF Sharm El Sheikh, Egypt	Hard	(Madagascar) Zarah Razafimahatratra	(Montenegro) Ana Veselinović (Russia) Eugeniya Pashkova	2–6, 1–6
Loss	4.	Jun 2014	ITF Breda, Netherlands	Clay	(Netherlands) Eva Wacanno	(Belarus) Sviatlana Pirazhenka (Russia) Natela Dzalamidze	4–6, 1–6
Loss	5.	Aug 2014	ITF Koksijde, Belgium	Clay	(United States) Bernarda Pera	(Belgium) Ysaline Bonaventure (Netherlands) Richèl Hogenkamp	4–6, 4–6
Win	10.	Aug 2014	ITF Fleurus, Belgium	Clay	(Belgium) Elise Mertens	(Argentina) Tatiana Búa (Chile) Daniela Seguel	6–2, 6–3
Win	11.	Aug 2014	ITF Fleurus, Belgium	Clay	(Netherlands) Arantxa Rus	(Sweden) Hilda Melander (Russia) Marina Melnikova	6–4, 6–1
Win	12.	Nov 2014	ITF Sharm El Sheikh, Egypt	Hard	(Belgium) Marie Benoît	(Russia) Valentyna Ivakhnenko (Russia) Polina Monova	6–4, 7–5
Win	13.	Dec 2014	ITF Sousse, Tunisia	Hard	(Netherlands) Kelly Versteeg	(Slovakia) Vivien Juhászová (Slovakia) Tereza Malíková	6–3, 6–0
Win	14.	Feb 2015	Open de l'Isère, France	Hard (i)	(Japan) Hiroko Kuwata	(France) Manon Arcangioli (Netherlands) Cindy Burger	6–1, 6–3
Win	15.	Feb 2015	ITF Beinasco, Italy	Clay (i)	(Chile) Daniela Seguel	(Switzerland) Xenia Knoll (Italy) Alice Matteucci	6–4, 4–6, [11–9]
Loss	6.	Jun 2015	Ilkley Trophy, UK	Grass	(Belgium) An-Sophie Mestach	(Romania) Raluca Olaru (China) Xu Yifan	3–6, 4–6
Win	16.	Aug 2015	ITF Koksijde, Belgium	Clay	(Belgium) Elise Mertens	(Poland) Justyna Jegiołka (France) Sherazad Reix	6–3, 6–2
Loss	7.	Apr 2016	Wiesbaden Open, Germany	Clay	(Belgium) Steffi Distelmans	(Belgium) Marie Benoît (Netherlands) Arantxa Rus	2–6, 2–6
Win	17.	May 2016	Open de Cagnes-sur-Mer, France	Clay	(Romania) Andreea Mitu	(Switzerland) Xenia Knoll (Serbia) Aleksandra Krunić	6–4, 7–5
Win	18.	May 2016	Open Saint-Gaudens, France	Clay	(Czech Republic) Renata Voráčová	(Germany) Nicola Geuer (Switzerland) Viktorija Golubic	6–1, 6–2
Win	19.	Jul 2016	Prague Open, Czech Republic	Clay	(Czech Republic) Renata Voráčová	(Spain) Sílvia Soler Espinosa (Spain) Sara Sorribes Tormo	7–5, 3–6, [10–4]
Win	20.	Aug 2016	ITF Koksijde, Belgium	Clay	(Belgium) Steffi Distelmans	(Turkey) Başak Eraydın (Belarus) Ilona Kremen	6–1, 6–4

=== Junior Grand Slam tournament finals ===
==== Doubles: 4 (2 titles, 2 runner-ups) ====
Result	Year	Tournament	Surface	Partner	Opponents	Score
Win	2011	Australian Open	Hard	(Belgium) An-Sophie Mestach	(Japan) Eri Hozumi (Japan) Miyu Kato	6–2, 6–3
Loss	2011	French Open	Clay	(Russia) Victoria Kan	(Russia) Irina Khromacheva (Ukraine) Maryna Zanevska	4–6, 5–7
Loss	2011	Wimbledon	Grass	(China) Tang Haochen	(Canada) Eugenie Bouchard (United States) Grace Min	5–7, 6–2, 5–7
Win	2011	US Open	Hard	(Russia) Irina Khromacheva	(United States) Gabrielle Andrews (United States) Taylor Townsend	6–4, 5–7, [10–5]
