= 2019 Burnie International – Women's singles =

Women's singles
- 2019 Burnie International

Final
- Champion: (Australia) Belinda Woolcock
- Runner-up: (Spain) Paula Badosa Gibert
- Score: 7–6^{(7–3)}, 7–6^{(7–4)}

Events
Singles	men	women
Doubles	men	women
← 2018 ·	Burnie International	· 2020 →

Marta Kostyuk was the defending champion, but lost to Wang Xiyu in the second round.

Qualifier Belinda Woolcock won the title, defeating Paula Badosa Gibert in the final, 7–6^{(7–3)}, 7–6^{(7–4)}.

== Seeds ==
1. (Spain) Sara Sorribes Tormo (semifinals)
2. (Japan) Nao Hibino (first round)
3. (Ukraine) Marta Kostyuk (second round)
4. (Hungary) Fanny Stollár (first round, retired)
5. (Russia) Irina Khromacheva (first round)
6. (Spain) Paula Badosa Gibert (final)
7. (Spain) Georgina García Pérez (quarterfinals)
8. (Bulgaria) Viktoriya Tomova (second round)

== Draw ==
=== Key ===
- Q = Qualifier
- WC = Wild card
- LL = Lucky loser
- Alt = Alternate
- SE = Special exempt
- PR = Protected ranking
- ITF = ITF entry
- JE = Junior exempt
- w/o = Walkover
- r = Retired
- d = Defaulted
- SR = Special ranking

=== Finals ===
Semifinals
1	(Spain) Sara Sorribes Tormo	4	1
6	(Spain) Paula Badosa Gibert	6	6
Q	(Australia) Belinda Woolcock	6	1	6
(Georgia (country)) Ekaterine Gorgodze	3	6	3

Final
6	(Spain) Paula Badosa Gibert	6^{3}	6^{4}
Q	(Australia) Belinda Woolcock	7^{7}	7^{7}

=== Top half ===
First round
1	(Spain) S Sorribes Tormo	7	6
Q	(Argentina) N Podoroska	5	1
Q	(United States) J Elie	1	1
(United Kingdom) K Swan	6	6
WC	(Australia) Z Hives	7^{7}	6
(Kazakhstan) E Rybakina	6^{1}	4
(Brazil) B Haddad Maia	1	4
7	(Spain) G García Pérez	6	6
3	(Ukraine) M Kostyuk	6	6
Q	(Chinese Taipei) K-c Chang	3	4
(Australia) E Perez	6	3	5
(China) Xiy Wang	4	6	7
(United Kingdom) G Taylor	2	0^{r}
(Romania) I Bara	6	2
Q	(Australia) G Da Silva-Fick	4	2
6	(Spain) P Badosa Gibert	6	6

Second round
1	(Spain) S Sorribes Tormo	2	6	7
(United Kingdom) K Swan	6	3	5
WC	(Australia) Z Hives	7	2	6^{5}
7	(Spain) G García Pérez	5	6	7^{7}
3	(Ukraine) M Kostyuk	4	1
(China) Xiy Wang	6	6
(Romania) I Bara	0	7^{7}	2
6	(Spain) P Badosa Gibert	6	6^{4}	6

Quarterfinals
1	(Spain) S Sorribes Tormo	6	6
7	(Spain) G García Pérez	0	2
(China) Xiy Wang	6	3	2
6	(Spain) P Badosa Gibert	3	6	6

Semifinals
1	(Spain) S Sorribes Tormo	4	1
6	(Spain) P Badosa Gibert	6	6

=== Bottom half ===
First round
8	(Bulgaria) V Tomova	6	7
(Belgium) M Zanevska	4	5
Q	(Australia) B Woolcock	6	7^{7}
WC	(Australia) N Bains	3	6^{3}
Q	(Australia) A Bai	3	3
WC	(Australia) L Cabrera	6	6
WC	(Australia) D Aiava	6
4	(Hungary) F Stollár	5^{r}
5	(Russia) I Khromacheva	4	5
(United States) A Muhammad	6	7
(Georgia (country)) E Gorgodze	6	3	6
(Germany) A Zaja	1	6	3
(Australia) J Fourlis	5	2
(Spain) S Soler Espinosa	7	6
(Australia) Ar Rodionova	6	7
2	(Japan) N Hibino	3	5

Second round
8	(Bulgaria) V Tomova	4	6	4
Q	(Australia) B Woolcock	6	3	6
WC	(Australia) L Cabrera	6	2	7^{7}
WC	(Australia) D Aiava	4	6	6^{5}
(United States) A Muhammad	2	4
(Georgia (country)) E Gorgodze	6	6
(Spain) S Soler Espinosa	7	3	6
(Australia) Ar Rodionova	5	6	2

Quarterfinals
Q	(Australia) B Woolcock	6	6
WC	(Australia) L Cabrera	1	4
(Georgia (country)) E Gorgodze	6	5	6
(Spain) S Soler Espinosa	4	7	1

Semifinals
Q	(Australia) B Woolcock	6	1	6
(Georgia (country)) E Gorgodze	3	6	3
