= Chihiro Muramatsu =

Japanese tennis player (born 1998)

Chihiro Muramatsu 村松千裕
- Country (sports): Japan
- Residence: Kashiwa, Japan
- Born: 22 May 1998 (age 28) Kōfu, Japan
- Height: 1.61 m (5 ft 3 in)
- Plays: Left (two-handed backhand)
- Prize money: $243,490

Singles
- Career record: 288–239
- Career titles: 1 ITF
- Highest ranking: No. 205 (24 February 2020)
- Current ranking: No. 1,288 (28 September 2026)

Grand Slam singles results
- Australian Open: Q2 (2020, 2021)
- French Open: Q1 (2020)
- Wimbledon: Q1 (2021)

Doubles
- Career record: 89–82
- Career titles: 3 ITF
- Highest ranking: No. 303 (2 April 2018)
- Current ranking: No. 1,595 (28 September 2026)
- Last updated on: 2 October 2026.

Chihiro Muramatsu (村松千裕, Muramatsu Chihiro; born 22 May 1998) is a Japanese tennis player. On 24 February 2020, she achieved a career-high singles ranking of world No. 205. On 2 April 2018, she peaked at No. 303 in the WTA doubles rankings.

Muramatsu has won one singles title and three doubles titles on the ITF Circuit. Since January 2026, she has not competed on any tournaments of the pro tour.

== Career ==
She made her WTA Tour main-draw debut at the 2018 Japan Women's Open, after receiving a wildcard for the doubles tournament, partnering with Hiroko Kuwata.

At the 2019 Kunming Open, as a part of the ITF Circuit, Muramatsu recorded one of her biggest victories defeating top 100 player Zhu Lin in the second round.

She qualified for the main draw of the 2020 Thailand Open in Hua Hin but lost to Barbara Haas, in the first round.

== Grand Slam performance timeline ==
Key
W	F	SF	QF	#R	RR	Q#	DNQ	A	NH

(W) winner; (F) finalist; (SF) semifinalist; (QF) quarterfinalist; (#R) rounds 4, 3, 2, 1; (RR) round-robin stage; (Q#) qualification round; (DNQ) did not qualify; (A) absent; (NH) not held; (SR) strike rate (events won / competed); (W–L) win–loss record.
To avoid confusion and double counting, these charts are updated at the conclusion of a tournament or when the player's participation has ended.

== ITF Circuit finals ==
=== Singles: 4 (1 title, 3 runner-ups) ===
Legend
W25/35 tournaments (1–1)
W10/15 tournaments (0–2)

Result	W–L	Date	Tournament	Tier	Surface	Opponent	Score
Loss	0–1	Dec 2015	ITF Victoria Park, Hong Kong	W10	Hard	(Finland) Emma Laine	1–6, 3–6
Loss	0–2	May 2017	ITF Hua Hin, Thailand	W15	Hard	(Australia) Michaela Haet	3–6, 7–6^{(5)}, 4–6
Win	1–2	Nov 2019	ITF Bhopal, India	W25	Hard	(India) Karman Thandi	6–1, 3–1 ret.
Loss	1–3	Mar 2025	ITF Mildura, Australia	W35	Grass	(Australia) Lizette Cabrera	0–6, 5–7

=== Doubles: 11 (3 titles, 8 runner-ups) ===
Legend
W60 tournaments (0–1)
W25 tournaments (2–3)
W10/15 tournaments (1–4)

Result	W–L	Date	Tournament	Tier	Surface	Partner	Opponents	Score
Loss	0–1	Mar 2016	ITF Nishitama, Japan	10,000	Hard	(Japan) Momoko Kobori	(Japan) Robu Kajitani (Japan) Mihoki Miyahara	6–4, 2–6, [6–10]
Loss	0–2	May 2017	ITF Hua Hin, Thailand	15,000	Hard	(Oman) Fatma Al-Nabhani	(China) Chen Jiahui (China) Zhang Ying	4–6, 1–6
Loss	0–3	Aug 2017	ITF Istanbul, Turkey	15,000	Clay	(Turkey) Melis Sezer	(Bulgaria) Dia Evtimova (Bosnia and Herzegovina) Jasmina Tinjić	4–6, 2–6
Win	1–3	Dec 2017	ITF Antalya, Turkey	15,000	Clay	(Turkey) Melis Sezer	(Austria) Pia König (Russia) Alina Silich	6–1, 6–4
Loss	1–4	Feb 2018	Burnie International, Australia	60,000	Hard	(Japan) Momoko Kobori	(United States) Vania King (United Kingdom) Laura Robson	6–7^{(3)}, 1–6
Loss	1–5	Mar 2018	Yokohama Challenger, Japan	25,000	Hard	(Japan) Momoko Kobori	(United Kingdom) Laura Robson (Hungary) Fanny Stollár	7–5, 2–6, [4–10]
Loss	1–6	Jul 2019	ITF Biella, Italy	W25	Clay	(Japan) Yuki Naito	(Romania) Elena Bogdan (Hungary) Réka Luca Jani	1–6, 3–6
Win	2–6	Jul 2019	ITF Torino, Italy	W25	Clay	(Japan) Yuki Naito	(Egypt) Mayar Sherif (Norway) Melanie Stokke	6–0, 6–2
Win	3–6	Nov 2021	ITF Haabneeme, Estonia	W25	Hard (i)	(United States) Jessica Failla	(Poland) Maja Chwalińska (Hungary) Adrienn Nagy	6–3, 6–4
Loss	3–7	Jun 2022	ITF Ra'anana, Israel	W25	Hard	(Hungary) Rebeka Stolmár	(Chinese Taipei) Lee Ya-hsuan (Chinese Taipei) Wu Fang-hsien	3–6, 1–6
Loss	3–8	Aug 2026	ITF Yeongwol, South Korea	W15	Hard	(Japan) Kisa Yoshioka	(South Korea) Jeong Bo-young (South Korea) Kim Na-ri	4–6, 2–6
