= Belinda Woolcock =

Australian tennis player

- Country (sports): Australia
- Born: 24 January 1995 (age 30) Melbourne
- Height: 1.73 m (5 ft 8 in)
- Plays: Right-handed (two-handed backhand)
- College: Florida Gators
- Prize money: US$ 108,680

Singles
- Career record: 87–69
- Career titles: 1 ITF
- Highest ranking: No. 290 (18 November 2019)

Grand Slam singles results
- Australian Open: Q2 (2020)

Doubles
- Career record: 65–45
- Career titles: 6 ITF
- Highest ranking: No. 207 (22 February 2021)

Grand Slam doubles results
- Australian Open: 2R (2021)

Grand Slam mixed doubles results
- Australian Open: 1R (2021)
- Last updated on: 11 April 2023.

Belinda Woolcock (born 24 January 1995) is an Australian inactive tennis player. She has a career-high singles ranking of 290 by the Women's Tennis Association (WTA), achieved on 18 November 2019, and a career-high WTA doubles ranking of 207, reached on 22 February 2021.

Woolcock made her major debut at the 2016 Australian Open, competing in the main draw of the doubles tournament with Ellen Perez; however, they lost in the first round to Jessica Moore and Storm Sanders. In 2017, Belinda and Astra Sharma won the Australia Open Wildcard Playoff to win a main-draw wildcard for the 2018 Australian Open women's doubles event.

She attended the University of Florida where she graduated in 2017 with a bachelor's degree of Science in Sport Management. In her final year for the Florida Gators, her team won the NCAA National Championship whilst being honoured the Most Valuable Player of the tournament. Due to this great effort in her final year with the Florida Gators, Belinda was recognised for her achievements and named the 2017 Honda Sports Award winner for Women's Tennis, signifying “the best of the best in collegiate athletics”.

== ITF Circuit finals ==
=== Singles: 3 (1 title, 2 runner–ups) ===
Legend
$60,000 tournaments
$25,000 tournaments
$15,000 tournaments

Result	W–L	Date	Tournament	Tier	Surface	Opponent	Score
Loss	0–1	Jul 2017	ITF Târgu Jiu, Romania	15,000	Clay	(Australia) Astra Sharma	6–4, 5–7, 4–6
Win	1–1	Jan 2019	Burnie International, Australia	60,000	Hard	(Spain) Paula Badosa	7–6^{(3)}, 7–6^{(4)}
Loss	1–2	May 2019	ITF Naples, United States	15,000	Clay	(United States) Katerina Stewart	4–6, 3–6

=== Doubles: 10 (6 titles, 4 runner–ups) ===
Legend $60,000 tournaments $25,000 tournaments $15,000 tournaments $10,000 tournaments	Finals by surface Hard (1–2) Clay (5–2) Grass (0–0) Carpet (0–0)

Result	W–L	Date	Tournament	Tier	Surface	Partner	Opponent	Score
Loss	0–1	Jun 2015	ITF Bethany Beach, United States	10,000	Clay	(Australia) Ellen Perez	(United States) Andie Daniell (United States) Sophie Chang	4–6, 1–6
Loss	0–2	Jul 2017	Amstelveen Open, Netherlands	15,000	Clay	(United Kingdom) Emily Arbuthnott	(United States) Dasha Ivanova (Netherlands) Rosalie van der Hoek	4–6, 4–6
Win	1–2	Jul 2017	ITF Targu Jiu, Romania	15,000	Clay	(Australia) Samantha Harris	(Italy) Federica Bilardo (Italy) Michele Alexandra Zmau	0–6, 6–4, [10–4]
Win	2–2	Jul 2017	ITF Targu Jiu, Romania	15,000	Clay	(Australia) Samantha Harris	(India) Riya Bhatia (Romania) Oana Gavrilă	6–3, 6–2
Win	3–2	Aug 2017	ITF Targu Jiu, Romania	15,000	Clay	(Australia) Samantha Harris	(Russia) Margarita Lazareva (Serbia) Milana Spremo	6–1, 7–5
Loss	3–3	Oct 2017	ITF Cairns, Australia	25,000	Hard	(Australia) Astra Sharma	(Australia) Naiktha Bains (Papua New Guinea) Abigail Tere-Apisah	6–4, 2–6, [6–10]
Loss	3–4	Feb 2018	ITF Perth, Australia	25,000	Hard	(Australia) Olivia Tjandramulia	(Australia) Jessica Moore (Australia) Ellen Perez	7–6^{(6)}, 1–6, [9–7] ret.
Win	4–4	Apr 2019	ITF Osprey, United States	25,000	Clay	(United States) Pamela Montez	(Netherlands) Arianne Hartono (Moldova) Alexandra Perper	7–6^{(3)}, 6–3
Win	5–4	May 2019	ITF Naples, United States	15,000	Clay	(United States) Mara Schmidt	(United States) Reese Brantmeier (United States) Kimmi Hance	6–3, 5–7, [10–6]
Win	6–4	Oct 2019	ITF Toowoomba, Australia	25,000	Hard	(Australia) Abbie Myers	(Japan) Haruna Arakawa (Japan) Misaki Matsuda	7–6^{(2)}, 6–3
