= 2009 McDonald's Burnie International – Men's singles =

Tennis contest held in Burnie

Men's singles
- 2009 McDonald's Burnie International

Final
- Champion: (Australia) Brydan Klein
- Runner-up: (Slovenia) Grega Žemlja
- Score: 6–3, 6–3

Events
Singles	men	women
Doubles	men	women
← 2007 ·	Burnie International	· 2010 →

Alun Jones was the defending champion, but he chose not to participate this year.
Brydan Klein won in the final 6–3, 6–3, against Grega Žemlja.

== Seeds ==
1. (Australia) Peter Luczak (semifinals)
2. (Australia) Robert Smeets (first round)
3. (Slovenia) Grega Žemlja (final)
4. (Australia) Brydan Klein (champion)
5. (Australia) Colin Ebelthite (second round)
6. (Australia) Joseph Sirianni (second round)
7. (Slovenia) Blaž Kavčič (second round)
8. (Australia) Marinko Matosevic (second round)

== Draw ==
=== Key ===
- Q = Qualifier
- WC = Wild card
- LL = Lucky loser
- Alt = Alternate
- ITF = ITF entry
- PR = Protected ranking
- SR = Special ranking
- SE = Special exempt
- JE = Junior exempt
- JR = Junior Accelerator Programme entrant
- CO = College Accelerator Programme entrant
- NG = Next Gen Accelerator Program entrant
- w/o = Walkover
- r = Retired
- d = Defaulted

=== Final four ===
Semifinals
1	(Australia) Peter Luczak	4	6^{2}
3	(Slovenia) Grega Žemlja	6	7^{7}
4	(Australia) Brydan Klein	6	6
WC	(Australia) John Millman	4	4

Final
3	(Slovenia) Grega Žemlja	3	3
4	(Australia) Brydan Klein	6	6

=== Top half ===
First round
1	(Australia) P Luczak	6	7
(Slovakia) I Klec	3	5
(Australia) R Junaid	6	6
(Australia) A Coelho	3	2
(Japan) Junn Mitsuhashi	6	6^{6}	3
WC	(Australia) B Tomic	4	7^{8}	6
(Japan) G Motomura	5	2
8	(Australia) M Matosevic	7	6
3	(Slovenia) G Žemlja	7^{7}	7
(Australia) A Feeney	6^{4}	5
(New Zealand) J Statham	5	6	4
(Australia) N Lindahl	7	4	6
Q	(Australia) A Hubble	6	7
(Japan) Y Sugita	3	5
(Japan) T Iwami	6^{4}	6	6
6	(Australia) J Sirianni	7^{7}	1	1

Second round
1	(Australia) P Luczak	4	6	7^{7}
(Australia) R Junaid	6	3	6^{2}
WC	(Australia) B Tomic	6	4	7^{8}
8	(Australia) M Matosevic	0	6	6^{6}
3	(Slovenia) G Žemlja	6	6
(Australia) N Lindahl	1	4
(Australia) A Hubble	6^{4}	3
(Japan) T Iwami	7^{7}	6

Quarterfinals
1	(Australia) P Luczak	6	6
WC	(Australia) B Tomic	3	3
3	(Slovenia) G Žemlja	7^{7}	7^{7}
(Japan) T Iwami	6^{2}	6^{5}

Semifinals
1	(Australia) P Luczak	4	6^{2}
3	(Slovenia) G Žemlja	6	7^{7}

=== Bottom half ===
First round
7	(Slovenia) B Kavčič	6^{6}	6	6
(Australia) M Ebden	7^{8}	1	3
(Japan) T Ito	3	4
(South Korea) KT Im	6	6
WC	(Australia) M Reid	6	6^{4}	6
Q	(Australia) D Propoggia	4	7^{7}	4
(Australia) M Armstrong	4	4
4	(Australia) B Klein	6	6
5	(Australia) C Ebelthite	6	6
WC	(Australia) Brendan McKenzie	3	2
(Australia) G Jones	6	3	6
(Japan) S Iwabuchi	1	6	4
Q	(Australia) K Hensel	5	3
WC	(Australia) J Millman	7	6
Q	(Australia) S Kadir	6	6
2	(Australia) R Smeets	3	2

Second round
7	(Slovenia) B Kavčič	3	6^{5}
(South Korea) KT Im	6	7^{7}
WC	(Australia) M Reid	6^{5}	5
4	(Australia) B Klein	7^{7}	7
5	(Australia) C Ebelthite	3	5
(Australia) G Jones	6	7
WC	(Australia) J Millman	6	6
Q	(Australia) S Kadir	3	2

Quarterfinals
(South Korea) KT Im	3	4
4	(Australia) B Klein	6	6
(Australia) G Jones	3	2
WC	(Australia) J Millman	6	6

Semifinals
4	(Australia) B Klein	6	6
WC	(Australia) J Millman	4	4
