= 2009 McDonald's Burnie International – Men's doubles =

Men's doubles
- 2009 McDonald's Burnie International

Final
- Champions: (Australia) Miles Armstrong (Australia) Sadik Kadir
- Runners-up: (Australia) Peter Luczak (Australia) Robert Smeets
- Score: 6–3, 3–6, [10–7]

Events
Singles	men	women
Doubles	men	women
← 2007 ·	Burnie International	· 2010 →

Samuel Groth and Joseph Sirianni were the defending champions, but Groth chose to not participate this year. Sirianni partnered up with Andrew Coelho, but they lost 6–7^{(6–8)}, 4–6 against Miles Armstrong and Sadik Kadir in the quarterfinals.
Miles Armstrong and Sadik Kadir won in the final 6–3, 3–6, [10–7] against Peter Luczak and Robert Smeets.

== Seeds ==
1. (Australia) Adam Feeney / (Australia) Todd Perry (semifinals)
2. (Australia) Rameez Junaid / (New Zealand) GD Jones (semifinals)
3. (Australia) Peter Luczak / (Australia) Robert Smeets (final)
4. (Australia) Andrew Coelho / (Australia) Joseph Sirianni (quarterfinals)

== Draw ==
=== Key ===
- Q = Qualifier
- WC = Wild card
- LL = Lucky loser
- Alt = Alternate
- SE = Special exempt
- PR = Protected ranking
- ITF = ITF entry
- JE = Junior exempt
- w/o = Walkover
- r = Retired
- d = Defaulted
- SR = Special ranking

=== Draw ===
First round
1	(Australia) A Feeney (Australia) T Perry	7^{7}	6
(Slovenia) B Kavčič (Slovenia) G Žemlga	6^{3}	3
(Japan) S Iwabuchi (Japan) T Iwami	6^{2}	4
(Australia) N Lindahl (Australia) M Matosevic	7^{7}	6
4	(Australia) A Coelho (Australia) J Sirianni	6	6
WC	(Australia) K Hensel (Australia) A Hubble	4	3
(Slovakia) I Klec (Australia) B McKenzie	6^{4}	4
(Australia) M Armstrong (Australia) S Kadir	7^{7}	6
(New Zealand) J Statham (New Zealand) M Statham	3	3
(South Korea) K Im (Japan) G Motomura	6	6
(Japan) J Mitsuhashi (Japan) Y Sugita	2	7^{7}	[1]
3	(Australia) P Luczak (Australia) R Smeets	6	6^{4}	[10]
WC	(Australia) D Propoggia (Australia) M Reid	7	6
(Australia) C Ebelthite (Australia) G Jones	5	3
WC	(Australia) Brydan Klein (Australia) B Tomic	4	4
2	(New Zealand) GD Jones (Australia) R Junaid	6	6

Quarterfinals
1	(Australia) A Feeney (Australia) T Perry	6	6
(Australia) N Lindahl (Australia) M Matosevic	4	2
4	(Australia) A Coelho (Australia) J Sirianni	6^{6}	4
' (Australia) M Armstrong (Australia) S Kadir	7^{8}	6
(South Korea) K Im (Japan) G Motomura	2	7^{7}	[8]
3	(Australia) P Luczak (Australia) R Smeets	6	6^{3}	[10]
WC	(Australia) D Propoggia (Australia) M Reid	4	4
2	(New Zealand) GD Jones (Australia) R Junaid	6	6

Semifinals
1	(Australia) A Feeney (Australia) T Perry	6^{5}	6^{2}
(Australia) M Armstrong (Australia) S Kadir	7^{7}	7^{7}
3	(Australia) P Luczak (Australia) R Smeets	6^{7}	6
2	(New Zealand) GD Jones (Australia) R Junaid	6^{5}	3

Final
3	(Australia) P Luczak (Australia) R Smeets	3	6	[7]
(Australia) M Armstrong (Australia) S Kadir	6	3	[10]
