= 2009 McDonald's Burnie International =

- Date: 2–8 February 2009
- Edition: 7th
- Location: Burnie, Australia

Champions

Men's singles
- (Australia) Brydan Klein

Women's singles
- (United States) Abigail Spears

Men's doubles
- (Australia) Miles Armstrong / (Australia) Sadik Kadir

Women's doubles
- (United States) Abigail Spears / (Australia) Monique Adamczak
← 2007 ·	McDonald's Burnie International	· 2010 →

The 2009 McDonald's Burnie International was a professional tennis tournament played on outdoor hard courts. It was the 7th edition of the tournament, and part of the 2009 ATP Challenger Tour. For the first time the tournament also hosted Women's Singles and Women's Doubles events as part of the 2009 ITF Women's Circuit. It took place in Burnie, Australia, between 2 and 8 February 2009.

== Singles main-draw entrants ==
=== Seeds ===
Country	Player	Rank^{1}	Seed
AUS	Peter Luczak	157	1
AUS	Robert Smeets	196	2
SLO	Grega Žemlja	197	3
AUS	Brydan Klein	248	4
AUS	Colin Ebelthite	253	5
AUS	Joseph Sirianni	257	6
SLO	Blaž Kavčič	286	7
AUS	Marinko Matosevic	295	8

- Rankings are as of 19 January 2009

=== Other entrants ===
The following players received wildcards into the singles main draw:

- (Australia) Brendan McKenzie
- (Australia) John Millman
- (Australia) Matt Reid
- (Australia) Bernard Tomic

The following players received entry from the qualifying draw:

- (Australia) Kaden Hensel
- (Australia) Adam Hubble
- (Australia) Sadik Kadir
- (Australia) Dane Propoggia

== Champions ==
=== Men's singles ===
(Australia) Brydan Klein def. (Slovenia) Grega Žemlja, 6–3, 6–3

=== Men's doubles ===
(Australia) Miles Armstrong / (Australia) Sadik Kadir def. (Australia) Peter Luczak / (Australia) Robert Smeets, 6–3, 3–6, [10–7]

=== Women's singles ===
(United States) Abigail Spears def. (China) Lu Jingjing, 6–4 6–2

=== Women's doubles ===
(United States) Abigail Spears / (Australia) Monique Adamczak def. (China) Xu Yifan / (China) Zhou Yimiao 6–2 6–4
