= 2010 McDonald's Burnie International – Men's doubles =

Men's doubles
- 2010 McDonald's Burnie International

Final
- Champions: (Australia) Matthew Ebden (Australia) Samuel Groth
- Runners-up: (Australia) James Lemke (Australia) Dane Propoggia
- Score: 6–7^{(8–10)}, 7–6^{(7–4)}, [10–8]

Events
Singles	men	women
Doubles	men	women
- Burnie International

Miles Armstrong and Sadik Kadir were the defending champions, but Armstrong chose to not participate this year. Kadir partnered up with Joseph Sirianni, but they lost 7–5, 5–7, [11–13] against Rameez Junaid and Daniel King-Turner in the first round.
Matthew Ebden and Samuel Groth won the title, defeating James Lemke and Dane Propoggia 6–7^{(8–10)}, 7–6^{(7–4)}, [10–8] in the final.

== Seeds ==
1. (Australia) Sadik Kadir / (Australia) Joseph Sirianni (first round)
2. (Australia) Kaden Hensel / (Australia) Adam Hubble (first round)
3. (Canada) Pierre-Ludovic Duclos / (Finland) Henri Kontinen (first round)
4. (Japan) Junn Mitsuhashi / (Chinese Taipei) Yang Tsung-hua (first round)

== Draw ==
Key

- Q = Qualifier
- WC = Wild card
- LL = Lucky loser
- Alt = Alternate
- ITF = ITF entry
- PR = Protected ranking
- SR = Special ranking
- SE = Special exempt
- JE = Junior exempt
- JR = Junior Accelerator Programme entrant
- CO = College Accelerator Programme entrant
- NG = Next Gen Accelerator Program entrant
- w/o = Walkover
- r = Retired
- d = Defaulted

=== Draw ===
First round
1	(Australia) S Kadir (Australia) J Sirianni	7	6^{7}	[11]
(Australia) R Junaid (New Zealand) D King-Turner	5	7^{9}	[13]
(Japan) H Moriya (Thailand) K Wachiramanowong	1	4
(Australia) B Klein (Australia) J Millman	6	6
4	(Japan) J Mitsuhashi (Chinese Taipei) T-h Yang	4	3
(Australia) C Ebelthite (Australia) M Reid	6	6
(Australia) N Lindahl (Australia) M Matosevic	1	3
(Australia) M Ebden (Australia) S Groth	6	6
(Australia) D Kelly (Australia) J Maher	2	6	[10]
(New Zealand) M Daniell (Australia) G Jones	6	4	[3]
(Australia) J Lemke (Australia) D Propoggia	6	6
3	(Canada) P-L Duclos (Finland) H Kontinen	3	4
(Australia) L Saville (Australia) J Swaysland	3	7	[10]
(Japan) T Ito (Japan) Y Sugita	6	5	[12]
(Australia) N Roshan (New Zealand) J Statham	7	6
2	(Australia) K Hensel (Australia) A Hubble	5	3

Quarterfinals
(Australia) R Junaid (New Zealand) D King-Turner	3	6^{3}
(Australia) B Klein (Australia) J Millman	6	7^{7}
(Australia) C Ebelthite (Australia) M Reid	3	4
(Australia) M Ebden (Australia) S Groth	6	6
(Australia) D Kelly (Australia) J Maher	1	4
(Australia) J Lemke (Australia) D Propoggia	6	6
(Japan) T Ito (Japan) Y Sugita	3	6	[4]
(Australia) N Roshan (New Zealand) J Statham	6	2	[10]

Semifinals
(Australia) B Klein (Australia) J Millman	3	3
(Australia) M Ebden (Australia) S Groth	6	6
(Australia) J Lemke (Australia) D Propoggia	7^{7}	6
(Australia) N Roshan (New Zealand) J Statham	6^{4}	3

Final
(Australia) M Ebden (Australia) S Groth	6^{8}	7^{7}	[10]
(Australia) J Lemke (Australia) D Propoggia	7^{10}	6^{4}	[8]
