= 2008 Next Generation Adelaide International – Singles =

Singles
- 2008 Next Generation Adelaide International

Final
- Champion: (France) Michaël Llodra
- Runner-up: (Finland) Jarkko Nieminen
- Score: 6–3, 6–4

Details
- Draw: 32 (4Q / 3WC)
- Seeds: 8

Events
Singles	Doubles
- Next Generation Adelaide International

Novak Djokovic was the defending champion, but chose not to participate that year.

Unseeded Michaël Llodra won in the final 6–3, 6–4, against third-seeded Jarkko Nieminen.

== Seeds ==
1. (Australia) Lleyton Hewitt (quarterfinals)
2. (France) Paul-Henri Mathieu (quarterfinals)
3. (Finland) Jarkko Nieminen (final)
4. (France) Gilles Simon (first round)
5. (Czech Republic) Radek Štěpánek (first round, retired due to a foot injury)
6. (France) Jo-Wilfried Tsonga (semifinals)
7. (Argentina) Juan Martín del Potro (first round)
8. (France) Sébastien Grosjean (first round)

== Draw ==
Key

- Q = Qualifier
- WC = Wild card
- LL = Lucky loser
- Alt = Alternate
- ITF = ITF entry
- PR = Protected ranking
- SR = Special ranking
- SE = Special exempt
- JE = Junior exempt
- JR = Junior Accelerator Programme entrant
- CO = College Accelerator Programme entrant
- NG = Next Gen Accelerator Program entrant
- w/o = Walkover
- r = Retired
- d = Defaulted

=== Finals ===
Semifinals
6	(France) Jo-Wilfried Tsonga	2	4
3	(Finland) Jarkko Nieminen	6	6
(France) Michaël Llodra	6	7^{10}
WC	(Australia) Joseph Sirianni	3	6^{8}

Final
3	(Finland) Jarkko Nieminen	3	4
(France) Michaël Llodra	6	6

=== Top half ===
First round
1	(Australia) L Hewitt	6	6
(Israel) D Sela	2	2
(Colombia) A Falla	3	6^{3}
(Argentina) J Acasuso	6	7^{7}
(Latvia) E Gulbis	6^{9}	6	6
Q	(Russia) A Golubev	7^{11}	4	2
(Romania) V Hănescu	3	6	5
6	(France) J-W Tsonga	6	4	7
3	(Finland) J Nieminen	6	6
Q	(Slovakia) I Klec	2	4
Q	(Canada) F Dancevic	6	7^{7}
(Italy) S Bolelli	2	6^{3}
(Germany) F Mayer	3	3
(Germany) M Zverev	6	6
(United States) V Spadea	4	6	6
8	(France) S Grosjean	6	1	3

Second round
1	(Australia) L Hewitt	6	6
(Argentina) J Acasuso	2	2
(Latvia) E Gulbis	3	2
6	(France) J-W Tsonga	6	6
3	(Finland) J Nieminen	6	6
Q	(Canada) F Dancevic	4	1
(Germany) M Zverev	3	5
(United States) V Spadea	6	7

Quarterfinals
1	(Australia) L Hewitt	4	2
6	(France) J-W Tsonga	6	6
3	(Finland) J Nieminen	7^{7}	6^{7}	7^{7}
(United States) V Spadea	6^{5}	7^{9}	6^{5}

Semifinals
6	(France) J-W Tsonga	2	4
3	(Finland) J Nieminen	6	6

=== Bottom half ===
First round
7	(Argentina) JM del Potro	3	3
(United States) M Russell	6	6
WC	(Australia) R Smeets	6	4	2
(Germany) B Becker	3	6	6
(Kazakhstan) E Korolev	6	7^{9}
LL	(Australia) A Jones	2	6^{7}
(France) M Llodra	7^{7}	6
4	(France) G Simon	6^{3}	3
5	(Czech Republic) R Štěpánek	6^{3}	3^{r}
WC	(Australia) J Sirianni	7^{7}	4
(United States) S Querrey	7	6
(Belgium) S Darcis	5	4
WC	(Australia) C Guccione	7	7^{7}
Q	(United States) W Odesnik	5	6^{5}
(France) J Benneteau	6^{2}	5
2	(France) P-H Mathieu	7^{7}	7

Second round
(United States) M Russell	4	4
(Germany) B Becker	6	6
(Kazakhstan) E Korolev	6^{3}	3
(France) M Llodra	7^{7}	6
WC	(Australia) J Sirianni	6^{5}	6	6
(United States) S Querrey	7^{7}	2	3
WC	(Australia) C Guccione	6	3	4
2	(France) P-H Mathieu	4	6	6

Quarterfinals
(Germany) B Becker	6^{5}	4
(France) M Llodra	7^{7}	6
WC	(Australia) J Sirianni	1	6	7^{8}
2	(France) P-H Mathieu	6	1	6^{6}

Semifinals
(France) M Llodra	6	7^{10}
WC	(Australia) J Sirianni	3	6^{8}
