= 2010 McDonald's Burnie International – Men's singles =

Tennis contest held in Burnie

Men's singles
- 2010 McDonald's Burnie International

Final
- Champion: (Australia) Bernard Tomic
- Runner-up: (Australia) Greg Jones
- Score: 6–4, 6–2

Events
Singles	men	women
Doubles	men	women
- Burnie International

Brydan Klein was the defending champion, but he lost in the first round 2–6, 6–1, 4–6, against Kittipong Wachiramanowong.
Bernard Tomic won in the final 6–4, 6–2 against Greg Jones.

== Seeds ==
1. (Slovenia) Grega Žemlja (quarterfinals)
2. (France) Guillaume Rufin (second round)
3. (Australia) Marinko Matosevic (first round)
4. (Australia) Brydan Klein (first round)
5. (Japan) Tatsuma Ito (second round)
6. (Australia) Nick Lindahl (second round)
7. (Australia) Greg Jones (final)
8. (Australia) Matthew Ebden (first round)

== Draw ==
Key

- Q = Qualifier
- WC = Wild card
- LL = Lucky loser
- Alt = Alternate
- ITF = ITF entry
- PR = Protected ranking
- SR = Special ranking
- SE = Special exempt
- JE = Junior exempt
- JR = Junior Accelerator Programme entrant
- CO = College Accelerator Programme entrant
- NG = Next Gen Accelerator Program entrant
- w/o = Walkover
- r = Retired
- d = Defaulted

=== Finals ===
Semifinals
Q	(Australia) Bernard Tomic	6	6
(Australia) Joseph Sirianni	4	4
7	(Australia) Greg Jones	6	6
(Japan) Yuichi Sugita	3	3

Final
Q	(Australia) Bernard Tomic	6	6
7	(Australia) Greg Jones	4	2

=== Top half ===
First round
1	(Slovenia) G Žemlja	6	7
(Australia) R Junaid	1	6
WC	(Australia) J Lemke	5	6	7^{7}
(Japan) J Mitsuhashi	7	1	6^{5}
(New Zealand) D King-Turner	6^{8}	5
Q	(Australia) B Tomic	7^{10}	7
(Finland) H Kontinen	1	1
6	(Australia) N Lindahl	6	6
3	(Australia) M Matosevic	3	6	6^{5}
(Australia) S Kadir	6	4	7^{7}
(Canada) P-L Duclos	2	6	6
(Australia) K Hensel	6	4	4
(Australia) J Sirianni	6	6
(Australia) C Ebelthite	2	2
(Japan) Y Ito	6	7
8	(Australia) M Ebden	2	5

Second round
1	(Slovenia) G Žemlja	7	4	7
WC	(Australia) J Lemke	5	6	6
Q	(Australia) B Tomic	4	7^{7}	6
6	(Australia) N Lindahl	6	6^{3}	4
(Australia) S Kadir	1	0
(Canada) P-L Duclos	6	6
(Australia) J Sirianni	6	6
(Japan) Y Ito	2	4

Quarterfinals
1	(Slovenia) G Žemlja	7^{9}	3	3
Q	(Australia) B Tomic	6^{7}	6	6
(Canada) P-L Duclos	6	3
(Australia) J Sirianni	7	6

Semifinals
Q	(Australia) B Tomic	6	6
(Australia) J Sirianni	4	4

=== Bottom half ===
First round
7	(Australia) G Jones	6	6
(Australia) S Groth	3	4
(Chinese Taipei) T-h Yang	4	5
WC	(Australia) M Reid	6	7
(Japan) H Moriya	2	4
(Australia) J Millman	6	6
Q	(Thailand) K Wachiramanowong	6	1	6
4	(Australia) B Klein	2	6	4
5	(Japan) T Ito	6	6
Q	(Australia) J Crowe	1	4
(Japan) Y Sugita	6	1	6
Q	(Australia) N Roshan	4	6	3
WC	(Australia) L Saville	6	3	4
WC	(Australia) D Kelly	4	6	6
(New Zealand) J Statham	3	6	0
2	(France) G Rufin	6	4	6

Second round
7	(Australia) G Jones	6	6
WC	(Australia) M Reid	3	4
(Australia) J Millman	6	6^{3}	6
Q	(Thailand) K Wachiramanowong	2	7^{7}	3
5	(Japan) T Ito	5	3
(Japan) Y Sugita	7	6
WC	(Australia) D Kelly	7^{7}	7^{8}
2	(France) G Rufin	6^{3}	6^{6}

Quarterfinals
7	(Australia) G Jones	4	7^{7}	7^{7}
(Australia) J Millman	6	6^{2}	6^{4}
(Japan) Y Sugita	6	4	6
WC	(Australia) D Kelly	1	6	4

Semifinals
7	(Australia) G Jones	6	6
(Japan) Y Sugita	3	3
