= 2007 McDonald's Burnie International =

- Date: 3–9 December 2007
- Edition: 6th
- Location: Burnie, Australia

Champions

Men's singles
- (Australia) Alun Jones

Men's doubles
- (Australia) Sam Groth / (Australia) Joseph Sirianni
- McDonald's Burnie International

The 2007 McDonald's Burnie International was a professional tennis tournament played on outdoor hard courts. It was the 6th edition of the tournament, and part of the 2007 ATP Challenger Series. It took place in Burnie, Australia, between 3 and 9 December 2007.

== Singles main-draw entrants ==
=== Seeds ===
Country	Player	Rank^{1}	Seed
AUS	Alun Jones	150	1
AUS	Robert Smeets	149	2
SVK	Ivo Klec	197	3
JPN	Go Soeda	206	4
AUS	Joseph Sirianni	205	5
AUS	Nathan Healey	257	6
CRO	Vjekoslav Skenderovic	302	7
USA	Todd Widom	282	8

=== Other entrants ===
The following players received wildcards into the singles main draw:

- (Australia) Andrew Roberts
- (Australia) Miles Armstrong
- (Australia) Brydan Klein
- (Australia) Matthew Ebden

The following players received entry from the qualifying draw:

- (Australia) Kaden Hensel
- (Australia) Andrew Thomas
- (New Zealand) Rubin Statham
- (New Zealand) G.D. Jones

== Champions ==
=== Men's singles ===
(Australia) Alun Jones def. (Australia) Rameez Junaid, 3–6, 7–6^{(7–4)}, 7–5

=== Men's doubles ===
(Australia) Sam Groth / (Australia) Joseph Sirianni def. (Australia) Nima Roshan / (New Zealand) Rubin Statham, 6–3, 1–6, [10–4]
