= 2007 Next Generation Adelaide International – Doubles =

Doubles
- 2007 Next Generation Adelaide International

Final
- Champions: (South Africa) Wesley Moodie (Australia) Todd Perry
- Runners-up: (Serbia) Novak Djokovic (Czech Republic) Radek Štěpánek
- Score: 6–4, 3–6, [15–13]

Events
Singles	Doubles
← 2006 ·	Next Generation Adelaide International	· 2008 →

Wesley Moodie and Todd Perry won the title, defeating Novak Djokovic and Radek Štěpánek 6–4, 3–6, [15–13] in the final.

== Seeds ==
1. (Israel) Jonathan Erlich / (Israel) Andy Ram (first round)
2. (Czech Republic) Lukáš Dlouhý / (Czech Republic) Pavel Vízner (quarterfinals)
3. (Sweden) Simon Aspelin / (South Africa) Chris Haggard (first round)
4. (Australia) Ashley Fisher / (United States) Tripp Phillips (quarterfinals)

== Draw ==
=== Key ===
- Q = Qualifier
- WC = Wild card
- LL = Lucky loser
- Alt = Alternate
- SE = Special exempt
- PR = Protected ranking
- ITF = ITF entry
- JE = Junior exempt
- w/o = Walkover
- r = Retired
- d = Defaulted
- SR = Special ranking

=== Draw ===
First round
1	(Israel) J Erlich (Israel) A Ram	4	3
(South Africa) W Moodie (Australia) T Perry	6	6
WC	(Australia) W Arthurs (Australia) C Guccione	6	2	[4]
(Czech Republic) J Hájek (Slovakia) D Hrbatý	2	6	[0^{r}]
4	(Australia) A Fisher (United States) T Phillips	7^{7}	6
(France) PH Mathieu (Serbia) J Tipsarević	6^{3}	0
(Germany) B Becker (Czech Republic) J Hernych	6	6^{5}	[7]
(Switzerland) Y Allegro (Sweden) R Lindstedt	3	7^{7}	[10]
(United States) P Goldstein (United States) J Thomas	6	5	[10]
WC	(Australia) N Healey (Australia) R Smeets	3	7	[8]
(France) A Clément (France) R Gasquet	6	6
3	(Sweden) S Aspelin (South Africa) C Haggard	1	2
(France) F Serra (France) G Simon	4	4
(Serbia) N Djokovic (Czech Republic) R Štěpánek	6	6
(Australia) P Hanley (Australia) L Hewitt	2	4
2	(Czech Republic) L Dlouhý (Czech Republic) P Vízner	6	6

Quarterfinals
(South Africa) W Moodie (Australia) T Perry	6	6
WC	(Australia) W Arthurs (Australia) C Guccione	4	4
4	(Australia) A Fisher (United States) T Phillips	4	6^{3}
(Switzerland) Y Allegro (Sweden) R Lindstedt	6	7^{7}
(United States) P Goldstein (United States) J Thomas	3	3
(France) A Clément (France) R Gasquet	6	6
(Serbia) N Djokovic (Czech Republic) R Štěpánek	6	6
2	(Czech Republic) L Dlouhý (Czech Republic) P Vízner	2	2

Semifinals
(South Africa) W Moodie (Australia) T Perry	6	7
(Switzerland) Y Allegro (Sweden) R Lindstedt	0	5
(France) A Clément (France) R Gasquet	5	6	[9]
(Serbia) N Djokovic (Czech Republic) R Štěpánek	7	3	[11]

Final
(South Africa) W Moodie (Australia) T Perry	6	3	[15]
(Serbia) N Djokovic (Czech Republic) R Štěpánek	4	6	[13]
