= 2008 Next Generation Adelaide International – Doubles =

Doubles
- 2008 Next Generation Adelaide International

Final
- Champions: (Argentina) Martin Garcia (Brazil) Marcelo Melo
- Runners-up: (Australia) Chris Guccione (Australia) Robert Smeets
- Score: 6–3, 3–6, [10–7]

Events
Singles	Doubles
← 2007 ·	Next Generation Adelaide International	· 2009 →

Wesley Moodie and Todd Perry were the defending champions, but Moodie chose not to participate, and only Perry competed that year.
Perry partnered with Jordan Kerr, but lost in the first round to Chris Guccione and Robert Smeets.

Martin Garcia and Marcelo Melo won in the final 6–3, 3–6, [10–7], against Chris Guccione and Robert Smeets.

== Seeds ==
1. (Australia) Paul Hanley / (India) Leander Paes (first round)
2. (Israel) Jonathan Erlich / (Israel) Andy Ram (semifinals)
3. (Australia) Jordan Kerr / (Australia) Todd Perry (first round)
4. (Argentina) Martin Garcia / (Brazil) Marcelo Melo (champions)

== Draw ==
=== Key ===
- Q = Qualifier
- WC = Wild card
- LL = Lucky loser
- Alt = Alternate
- SE = Special exempt
- PR = Protected ranking
- ITF = ITF entry
- JE = Junior exempt
- w/o = Walkover
- r = Retired
- d = Defaulted
- SR = Special ranking

=== Draw ===
First round
1	(Australia) P Hanley (India) L Paes	6^{0}	5
ALT	(Germany) B Becker (Austria) O Marach	7^{7}	7
(South Africa) R de Voest (Australia) A Fisher	6	5	[7]
(France) J Benneteau (France) P-H Mathieu	1	7	[10]
4	(Argentina) M Garcia (Brazil) M Melo	6	6
(France) G Simon (Germany) M Zverev	2	3
(Sweden) R Lindstedt (Finland) J Nieminen	7^{8}	1	[4]
(Italy) S Bolelli (Israel) D Sela	6^{6}	6	[10]
(United States) E Butorac (Canada) F Dancevic	6	5	[10]
WC	(Australia) N Healey (Australia) L Hewitt	3	7	[8]
WC	(Australia) C Guccione (Australia) R Smeets	6	6
3	(Australia) J Kerr (Australia) T Perry	4	1
(France) S Grosjean (France) J-W Tsonga	6	6^{6}	[6]
(South Africa) C Haggard (Germany) F Mayer	2	7^{8}	[10]
ALT	(Russia) E Korolev (United States) S Querrey	2	4
2	(Israel) J Erlich (Israel) A Ram	6	6

Quarterfinals
ALT	(Germany) B Becker (Austria) O Marach	6	4	[10]
(France) J Benneteau (France) P-H Mathieu	4	6	[8]
4	(Argentina) M Garcia (Brazil) M Melo	7	6
(Italy) S Bolelli (Israel) D Sela	5	3
(United States) E Butorac (Canada) F Dancevic	4	3
WC	(Australia) C Guccione (Australia) R Smeets	6	6
(South Africa) C Haggard (Germany) F Mayer	3	1
2	(Israel) J Erlich (Israel) A Ram	6	6

Semifinals
ALT	(Germany) B Becker (Austria) O Marach	6^{2}	1
4	(Argentina) M Garcia (Brazil) M Melo	7^{7}	6
WC	(Australia) C Guccione (Australia) R Smeets	6	6
2	(Israel) J Erlich (Israel) A Ram	4	4

Final
4	(Argentina) M Garcia (Brazil) M Melo	6	3	[10]
WC	(Australia) C Guccione (Australia) R Smeets	3	6	[7]
