= 2007 Next Generation Adelaide International =

- Date: 1–7 January
- Edition: 30th
- Category: ATP International Series
- Draw: 24S (RR) / 16D
- Prize money: US$411,000
- Surface: Hard (Rebound Ace)
- Location: Adelaide, South Australia, Australia

Champions

Singles
- (Serbia) Novak Djokovic

Doubles
- (South Africa) Wesley Moodie / (Australia) Todd Perry
- Next Generation Adelaide International

The 2007 Next Generation Adelaide International was a professional men's tennis event on the 2007 ATP Tour in Adelaide, Australia, held from 1 January to 7 January 2007. Novak Djokovic won the title, an ATP International Series level tournament.

This was the first tournament of the season (alongside Viña del Mar, Delray Beach, Buenos Aires and Las Vegas) that implemented a 24-player round robin tournament for the singles competition, as part of the round-robin trials proposed during this season.

== Singles main-draw entrants ==
=== Seeds ===
| Country | Player | Rank^{1} | Seed |
|---|---|---|---|
| SRB | Novak Djokovic | 16 | 1 |
| FRA | Richard Gasquet | 18 | 2 |
| CZE | Radek Štěpánek | 19 | 3 |
| AUS | Lleyton Hewitt | 20 | 4 |
| SVK | Dominik Hrbatý | 21 | 5 |
| FRA | Arnaud Clément | 42 | 6 |
| FRA | Gilles Simon | 45 | 7 |
| FRA | Paul-Henri Mathieu | 55 | 8 |

- Rankings are as of 25 December 2006.

=== Other entrants ===
The following players received wildcards into the main draw:

- (Australia) Chris Guccione
- (Australia) Alun Jones
- (Australia) Peter Luczak

The following players received entry from the qualifying draw:

- (Australia) Paul Baccanello
- (Australia) Nathan Healey
- (South Africa) Wesley Moodie
- (Japan) Go Soeda

The following player received entry as a lucky loser:

- (Argentina) Martín Vassallo Argüello

=== Withdrawals ===
During the tournament

- (Serbia) Janko Tipsarević → replaced by Martín Vassallo Argüello

=== Retirements ===
- (France) Florent Serra (illness)
- (Serbia) Janko Tipsarević (adductor injury)

== Doubles main-draw entrants ==
=== Seeds ===
| Country | Player | Country | Player | Rank^{1} | Seed |
|---|---|---|---|---|---|
| ISR | Jonathan Erlich | ISR | Andy Ram | 26 | 1 |
| CZE | Lukáš Dlouhý | CZE | Pavel Vízner | 35 | 2 |
| SWE | Simon Aspelin | RSA | Chris Haggard | 50 | 3 |
| AUS | Ashley Fisher | USA | Tripp Phillips | 57 | 4 |

- ^{1} Rankings are as of 25 December 2006.

=== Other entrants ===
The following pairs received wildcards into the main draw:

- (Australia) Wayne Arthurs / (Australia) Chris Guccione
- (Australia) Nathan Healey / (Australia) Robert Smeets

=== Retirements ===
- (Czech Republic) Jan Hájek (dizziness)

== Finals ==
=== Singles ===
(Serbia) Novak Djokovic defeated (Australia) Chris Guccione, 6–3, 6–7^{(6–8)}, 6–4

- It was Djokovic's 1st title of the year and the 3rd of his career.

=== Doubles ===
(South Africa) Wesley Moodie / (Australia) Todd Perry defeated (Serbia) Novak Djokovic / (Czech Republic) Radek Štěpánek, 6–4, 3–6, [15–13]

- It was 1st title of the year and the 2nd of his career for Moodie; 1st title of the year and the 5th of his career for Perry.
- Both players have won their 1st of a total of 2 titles as a team, with the other one being Valencia at the same year.
