= 2007 Next Generation Adelaide International – Singles =

Singles
- 2007 Next Generation Adelaide International

Final
- Champion: (Serbia) Novak Djokovic
- Runner-up: (Australia) Chris Guccione
- Score: 6–3, 6–7^{(6–8)}, 6–4

Details
- Seeds: 8

Events
Singles	Doubles
- Next Generation Adelaide International

Florent Serra was the defending champion, but was eliminated in the round robin competition.

Novak Djokovic won the title, defeating Chris Guccione 6–3, 6–7^{(6–8)}, 6–4 in the final.

== Seeds ==
1. (Serbia) Novak Djokovic (champion)
2. (France) Richard Gasquet (quarterfinals)
3. (Czech Republic) Radek Štěpánek (round robin)
4. (Australia) Lleyton Hewitt (round robin)
5. (Slovakia) Dominik Hrbatý (round robin)
6. (France) Arnaud Clément (round robin)
7. (France) Gilles Simon (round robin)
8. (France) Paul-Henri Mathieu (round robin)

== Draw ==
Key

- Q = Qualifier
- WC = Wild card
- LL = Lucky loser
- Alt = Alternate
- ITF = ITF entry
- PR = Protected ranking
- SR = Special ranking
- SE = Special exempt
- JE = Junior exempt
- JR = Junior Accelerator Programme entrant
- CO = College Accelerator Programme entrant
- NG = Next Gen Accelerator Program entrant
- w/o = Walkover
- r = Retired
- d = Defaulted

=== Finals ===
Quarterfinals
1	(Serbia) Novak Djokovic	6	7
(United States) Paul Goldstein	4	5
(United States) Vincent Spadea	6^{7}	3
(Sweden) Joachim Johansson	7^{9}	6
(Argentina) Juan Martín del Potro	6	6
(Russia) Igor Kunitsyn	2	0
WC	(Australia) Chris Guccione	1	6	7^{7}
2	(France) Richard Gasquet	6	3	6^{4}

Semifinals
1	(Serbia) Novak Djokovic	6	6
(Sweden) Joachim Johansson	3	2
(Argentina) Juan Martín del Potro	7	3	5
WC	(Australia) Chris Guccione	5	6	7

Final
1	(Serbia) Novak Djokovic	6	6^{6}	6
WC	(Australia) Chris Guccione	3	7^{8}	4

=== Round robin ===
	Group 1	(Serbia) Djokovic	(Czech Republic) Hájek	(Australia) Jones	RR W–L	Set W–L	Game W–L	Standings
1	(Serbia) Novak Djokovic		6–0, 6–1	6–1, 6–2	2–0	4–0 (100%)	24–4 (85.7%)	1
	(Czech Republic) Jan Hájek	0–6, 1–6		3–6, 2–6	0–2	0–4 (0.0%)	6–24 (20.0%)	3
WC	(Australia) Alun Jones	1–6, 2–6	6–3, 6–2		1–1	2–2 (50.0%)	15–17 (46.9%)	2

	Group 2	(Slovakia) Hrbatý	(United States) Goldstein	(Australia) Luczak	RR W–L	Set W–L	Game W–L	Standings
5	(Slovakia) Dominik Hrbatý		2–6, 6–7^{(4–7)}	6–7^{(7–9)}, 3–6	0–2	0–4 (0.0%)	17–26 (39.5%)	3
	(United States) Paul Goldstein	6–2, 7–6^{(7–4)}		7–6^{(10–8)}, 6–1	2–0	4–0 (100%)	26–15 (63.4%)	1
WC	(Australia) Peter Luczak	7–6^{(9–7)}, 6–3	6–7^{(8–10)}, 1–6		1–1	2–2 (50.0%)	20–22 (47.6%)	2

	Group 3	(Czech Republic) Štěpánek	(United States) Spadea	(Russia) Korolev	RR W–L	Set W–L	Game W–L	Standings
3	(Czech Republic) Radek Štěpánek		4–6, 4–6	4–6, 6–2, 6–2	1–1	2–3 (40.0%)	24–22 (52.2%)	2
	(United States) Vincent Spadea	6–4, 6–4		6–1, 7–6^{(8–6)}	2–0	4–0 (100%)	25–15 (62.5%)	1
	(Russia) Evgeny Korolev	6–4, 2–6, 2–6	1–6, 6–7^{(6–8)}		0–2	1–4 (20.0%)	17–29 (37.0%)	3

	Group 4	(France) Simon	(France) Serra	(Sweden) Johansson	RR W–L	Set W–L	Game W–L	Standings
7	(France) Gilles Simon		6–2, 5–7, 1–1, ret.	4–6, 5–7	1–1	2–2 (50.0%)	21–23 (47.7%)	2
	(France) Florent Serra	2–6, 7–5, 1–1, ret.		2–6, 6–3, 6–4	1–1	2–3 (40.0%)	24–25 (47.1%)	3
	(Sweden) Joachim Johansson	6–4, 7–5	6–2, 3–6, 4–6		1–1	3–2 (60.0%)	26–23 (53.1%)	1

	Group 5	(France) Mathieu	(Czech Republic) Hernych	(Argentina) del Potro	RR W–L	Set W–L	Game W–L	Standings
8	(France) Paul-Henri Mathieu		4–6, 6–3, 6–3	6–7^{(3–7)}, 6–0, 3–6	1–1	3–3 (50.0%)	31–25 (55.4%)	2
	(Czech Republic) Jan Hernych	6–4, 3–6, 3–6		2–6, 4–6	0–2	1–4 (20.0%)	18–28 (39.1%)	3
	(Argentina) Juan Martín del Potro	7–6^{(7–3)}, 0–6, 6–3	6–2, 6–4		2–0	4–1 (80.0%)	25–21 (54.3%)	1

	Group 6	(Australia) Hewitt	(Serbia) Tipsarević (Argentina) Vassallo Argüello	(Russia) Kunitsyn	RR W–L	Set W–L	Game W–L	Standings
4	(Australia) Lleyton Hewitt		6–1, 4–2, ret. (w/ Tipsarević)	6–4, 6–7^{(4–7)}, 4–6	1–1	3–2 (60.0%)	26–20 (56.5%)	2
LL	(Serbia) Janko Tipsarević (Argentina) Martín Vassallo Argüello	1–6, 2–4, ret. (w/ Tipsarević)		4–6, 2–6 (w/ Vassallo Argüello)	0–1; 0–1	0–2 (0.0%); 0–2 (0.0%)	3–10 (23.1%); 6–12 (33.3%)	X 3
	(Russia) Igor Kunitsyn	4–6, 7–6^{(7–4)}, 6–4	6–4, 6–2 (w/ Vassallo Argüello)		2–0	4–1 (80.0%)	29–22 (56.9%)	1

	Group 7	(France) Clément	(Germany) Becker	(Australia) Guccione	RR W–L	Set W–L	Game W–L	Standings
6	(France) Arnaud Clément		7–5, 6–1	6–7^{(4–7)}, 6–7^{(5–7)}	1–1	2–2 (50.0%)	25–20 (55.5%)	2
	(Germany) Benjamin Becker	5–7, 1–6		5–7, 3–6	0–2	0–4 (0.0%)	14–26 (35.0%)	3
WC	(Australia) Chris Guccione	7–6^{(7–4)}, 7–6^{(7–5)}	7–5, 6–3		2–0	4–0 (100%)	27–20 (57.4%)	1

	Group 8	(France) Gasquet	(Germany) Mayer	(Canada) Dancevic	RR W–L	Set W–L	Game W–L	Standings
2	(France) Richard Gasquet		6–2, 6–1	7–5, 5–7, 6–3	2–0	4–1 (80.0%)	30–18 (62.5%)	1
	(Germany) Florian Mayer	2–6, 1–6		6–4, 6–4	1–1	2–2 (50.0%)	15–20 (42.9%)	2
	(Canada) Frank Dancevic	5–7, 7–5, 3–6	4–6, 4–6		0–2	1–4 (20.0%)	23–30 (43.4%)	3

== Elimination round ==
Prior to the round robin and after the completion of the qualifying draws, the 16 players with the lowest tier in the tournament (4 qualifiers, 3 wild cards and 9 based on ATP rankings) competed in the elimination round in order to get one of the 8 last spots into the round robin competition. Winners in this round entered as main entrants.

Main draw elimination round
Event	Winner	Loser	Score
Main entrant 1	(Australia) Peter Luczak [WC]	(Argentina) Martín Vassallo Argüello ^{RR-LL}	6–3, 6–4
Main entrant 2	(Canada) Frank Dancevic	(Australia) Paul Baccanello [Q]	6–3, 6–3
Main entrant 3	(Argentina) Juan Martín del Potro	(Japan) Go Soeda [Q]	6–3, 6–2
Main entrant 4	(Australia) Chris Guccione [WC]	(United States) Amer Delić	4–6, 6–3, 6–4
Main entrant 5	(Russia) Igor Kunitsyn	(South Africa) Wesley Moodie [Q]	7–6^{(7–3)}, 3–6, 6–1
Main entrant 6	(Sweden) Joachim Johansson	(Czech Republic) Lukáš Dlouhý	6–4, 6–4
Main entrant 7	(Russia) Evgeny Korolev	(Australia) Nathan Healey [Q]	7–5, 7–5
Main entrant 8	(Australia) Alun Jones [WC]	(Luxembourg) Gilles Müller	6–2, 7–5

^{RR-LL}: Vassallo Argüello entered the round robin competition as lucky loser.

== Qualifying ==
=== Seeds ===
1. (South Africa) Wesley Moodie (qualified)
2. (South Africa) Rik de Voest (qualifying competition)
3. (Latvia) Ernests Gulbis (qualifying competition)
4. (Chinese Taipei) Wang Yeu-Tzuoo (first round)
5. (Germany) Mischa Zverev (first round)
6. (Australia) Wayne Arthurs (first round)
7. (Australia) Nathan Healey (qualified)
8. (Japan) Go Soeda (qualified)

=== Qualifiers ===
1. (South Africa) Wesley Moodie
2. (Japan) Go Soeda
3. (Australia) Nathan Healey
4. (Australia) Paul Baccanello

=== Qualifying draw ===
==== First qualifier ====
First round
1	(South Africa) Wesley Moodie	6	6
(Chinese Taipei) Chen Ti	4	2
(Germany) Tobias Summerer	6	6^{6}	6
6	(Australia) Wayne Arthurs	2	7^{8}	2

Qualifying competition
1	(South Africa) Wesley Moodie	6	6
(Germany) Tobias Summerer	4	4

==== Second qualifier ====
First round
2	(South Africa) Rik de Voest	7	6
WC	(Australia) Andrew Coelho	5	4
(Czech Republic) Lukáš Rosol	5	1
8	(Japan) Go Soeda	7	6

Qualifying competition
2	(South Africa) Rik de Voest	1	7^{7}	4
8	(Japan) Go Soeda	6	6^{1}	6

==== Third qualifier ====
First round
3	(Latvia) Ernests Gulbis	6	7^{7}
WC	(Australia) Robert Smeets	4	6^{5}
WC	(Australia) Nick Lindahl	4	2
7	(Australia) Nathan Healey	6	6

Qualifying competition
3	(Latvia) Ernests Gulbis	6^{5}	6	5
7	(Australia) Nathan Healey	7^{7}	2	7

==== Fourth qualifier ====
First round
4	(Chinese Taipei) Wang Yeu-Tzuoo	2	5
(Italy) Andrea Stoppini	6	7
(Australia) Paul Baccanello	6	6
5	(Germany) Mischa Zverev	3	4

Qualifying competition
(Italy) Andrea Stoppini	6^{7}	1
(Australia) Paul Baccanello	7^{9}	6
