= 2010 McDonald's Burnie International =

- Date: 1–7 February 2010
- Edition: 8th
- Location: Burnie, Australia

Champions

Men's singles
- (Australia) Bernard Tomic

Women's singles
- (Russia) Arina Rodionova

Men's doubles
- (Australia) Matthew Ebden / (Australia) Samuel Groth

Women's doubles
- (Australia) Jessica Moore / (Russia) Arina Rodionova
← 2009 ·	McDonald's Burnie International	· 2011 →

The 2010 McDonald's Burnie International was a professional tennis tournament played on outdoor hard courts. It was the 8th edition of the tournament, and part of the 2010 ATP Challenger Tour and 2010 ITF Women's Circuit. It took place in Burnie, Australia, between 1 and 7 February 2010.

== Main draw singles entrants ==
=== Seeds ===
Country	Player	Rank^{1}	Seed
SLO	Grega Žemlja	169	1
FRA	Guillaume Rufin	173	2
AUS	Marinko Matosevic	180	3
AUS	Brydan Klein	204	4
JPN	Tatsuma Ito	210	5
AUS	Nick Lindahl	235	6
AUS	Greg Jones	250	7
AUS	Matthew Ebden	251	8

- Rankings are as of 18 January 2010

=== Other entrants ===
The following players received wildcards into the singles main draw:

- (Australia) Dayne Kelly
- (Australia) James Lemke
- (Australia) Matt Reid
- (Australia) Luke Saville

The following players received entry from the qualifying draw:

- (Australia) Joshua Crowe
- (Australia) Nima Roshan
- (Australia) Bernard Tomic
- (Thailand) Kittipong Wachiramanowong

== Champions ==
=== Singles ===
(Australia) Bernard Tomic def. (Australia) Greg Jones, 6–4, 6–2

=== Doubles ===
(Australia) Matthew Ebden / (Australia) Samuel Groth def. (Australia) James Lemke / (Australia) Dane Propoggia, 6–7^{(8–10)}, 7–6^{(7–4)}, [10–8]

=== Women's singles ===
(Russia) Arina Rodionova def. (Australia) Jarmila Groth 6–1, 6–0

=== Women's doubles ===
(Australia) Jessica Moore / (Russia) Arina Rodionova def. (Hungary) Tímea Babos / (Russia) Anna Arina Marenko 6–2 6–4
