= 2008 Next Generation Adelaide International =

- Date: 31 December – 6 January
- Edition: 31st
- Category: International Series
- Draw: 32S / 16D
- Prize money: $440,000
- Surface: Hard / outdoor
- Location: Adelaide, Australia
- Venue: Memorial Drive Park

Champions

Singles
- (France) Michaël Llodra

Doubles
- (Argentina) Martín García / (Brazil) Marcelo Melo
- Next Generation Adelaide International

The 2008 Next Generation Adelaide International was a men's tennis tournament played on outdoor hard courts. It was the 31st edition of the event known that year as the Next Generation Adelaide International, and was part of the International Series of the 2008 ATP Tour. It took place at the Memorial Drive Park in Adelaide, Australia, from 31 December 2007 through 6 January 2008.

The draw was led by former World No. 1, two-time Adelaide champion and recent Cincinnati semi-finalist Lleyton Hewitt, Moscow runner-up Paul-Henri Mathieu, and Basel finalist Jarkko Nieminen. Also competing were Bucharest winner Gilles Simon, Canada Masters semi-finalist Radek Štěpánek, Jo-Wilfried Tsonga, Juan Martín del Potro and Sébastien Grosjean.

Unseeded Michaël Llodra won the singles today.

== Finals ==
=== Singles ===
(France) Michaël Llodra defeated (Finland) Jarkko Nieminen, 6–3, 6–4

- It was Michaël Llodra's 1st title of the year, and his 2nd overall.

=== Doubles ===
(Argentina) Martín García / (Brazil) Marcelo Melo defeated (Australia) Chris Guccione / (Australia) Robert Smeets, 6–3, 3–6, [10–7]
