= Chris Guccione (tennis) =

Australian tennis player

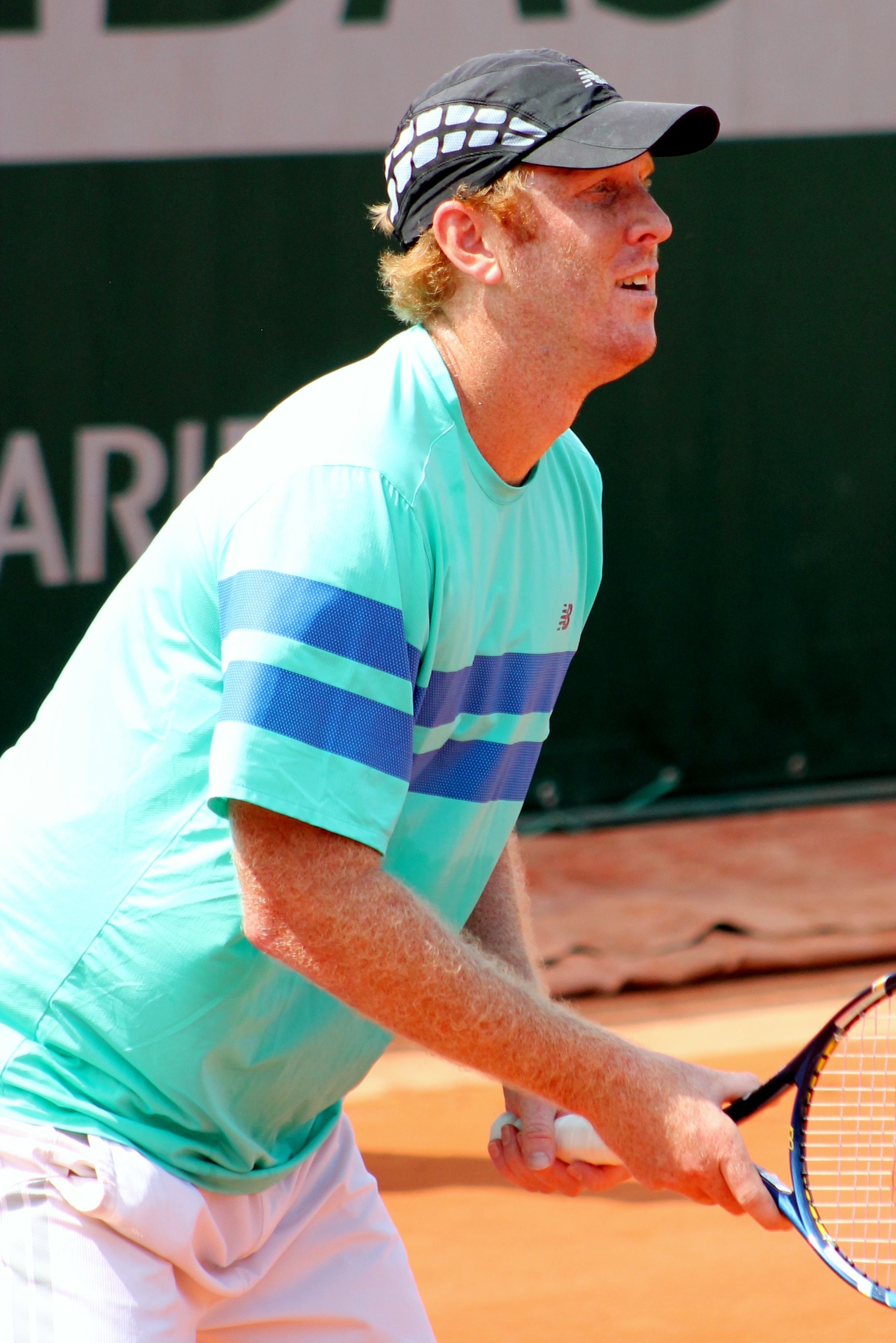
- Chris Guccione playing at the 2016 French Open
- Country (sports): Australia
- Residence: Greenvale, Australia
- Born: 30 July 1985 (age 40) Melbourne, Victoria, Australia
- Height: 6 ft 7 in (201 cm)
- Turned pro: 2003
- Retired: 2020 (last match played)
- Plays: Left-handed (one-handed backhand)
- Prize money: US $1,761,876

Singles
- Career record: 45–65 (in ATP Tour events)
- Career titles: 0
- Highest ranking: No. 67 (7 April 2008)

Grand Slam singles results
- Australian Open: 2R (2004, 2009)
- French Open: 2R (2005)
- Wimbledon: 2R (2007)
- US Open: 2R (2008)

Doubles
- Career record: 120–110 (in ATP Tour events)
- Career titles: 5
- Highest ranking: No. 38 (3 November 2014)

Grand Slam doubles results
- Australian Open: QF (2017)
- French Open: 3R (2016)
- Wimbledon: 3R (2010, 2012, 2014)
- US Open: QF (2009, 2016)

Other doubles tournaments
- Olympic Games: QF (2008)

Grand Slam mixed doubles results
- Australian Open: SF (2017)
- Wimbledon: 3R (2014)

Christopher Luke Guccione (/ˌɡuːtʃiˈoʊni/ GOO-chee-OH-nee; born 30 July 1985) is a former Australian professional tennis player from Greenvale, Victoria. He has won five ATP Tour doubles titles, and reached career-high rankings of singles world No. 67 achieved on 7 April 2008 and doubles world No. 38 achieved on 3 November 2014.

== Personal life ==
Guccione is of Italian descent on his father's side. He was an Australian Institute of Sport scholarship holder. He is married to Andra Kucerak, with whom he has two children.

== Tennis career ==
Guccione is coached by countryman and former ATP professional Anthony Lane. Guccione is noted for his good service; he hit 50 aces in a three-set qualifying match at Wimbledon in 2005. The good service has led fellow Australian player Mark Philippoussis to call him a "Wayne Arthurs clone". He is a serve-and-volley player. Despite these strong assets in the game he has still yet to win any ATP titles and very rarely makes it past the first round of major tournaments. During his career, he has won 5 ATP Challenger Series: hardcourt victories in Burnie and Canberra in 2005, clay court victories in 2006 at Quito and Medellín, and a victory on hardcourt at Aptos in 2009.

He has had greater success as a doubles player, often partnering with fellow Australians Carsten Ball and Sam Groth. Guccione has represented his country in several Davis Cup ties, compiling a winning record. In a 2011 tie against Switzerland, for example, he teamed with Lleyton Hewitt to beat the Olympic gold medal-winning team of Roger Federer and Stan Wawrinka.

=== 2004 ===
Guccione burst onto the scene at the 2004 Medibank International tournament, where he defeated former World No. 1 (and then-World No. 3) Juan Carlos Ferrero 6–3, 7–6. At that time Guccione was not even ranked in the top 400. Despite this momentous victory, he lost to world no. 32 Wayne Ferreira of South Africa 7–6, 7–5 in the second round. In the Australian Open he won his first round match against Australia's Alun Jones 6–3, 7–6, 6–2. He was eliminated in the next round by American Robby Ginepri 6–4, 6–3, 6–3. In November, he won the first singles tournament of his career in Berri, South Australia. He defeated fellow Australian Robert Smeets in straight sets 6–4, 6–4 in the final.

=== 2005 ===
Guccione's first tournament of the year was the Australian Open. He played world no. 12 Guillermo Cañas and lost in straight sets 6–4, 6–2, 7–6. In February, Guccione won his first Challenger title of his career in Burnie, defeating Gouichi Motomura of Japan 6–3, 7–5. In April 2005 at Canberra, he won another Challenger title after he defeated Germany's Lars Uebel 7–5, 6–1 in the final. His next tournament was the French Open. It was his first French Open of his career. Despite this, he defeated Spain's Santiago Ventura in the first round 6–3, 2–6, 6–1, 3–6, 6–2. He was knocked out in the second round by home-favourite Paul-Henri Mathieu 6–3, 6–4, 6–4. He did not participate in any more grand slams in 2005.

=== 2006 ===
In January 2006 Guccione managed to once again defeat Juan Carlos Ferrero at the Medibank International. In February 2006, Guccione won the deciding fifth and final rubber against Switzerland's George Bastl in the Davis Cup. He continued this Davis Cup success in April at Kooyong in Victoria when he defeated his more experienced opponent, Max Mirnyi, in the opening Quarter-final tie against Belarus. Despite winning all but one of his 2006 Davis Cup matches, Guccione was dropped from the Australian Davis Cup Team to make way for the returning Mark Philippoussis.

=== 2007 ===
Guccione began his 2007 season in Adelaide with a wildcard entry at the Next Generation Adelaide International. There, he beat world number 93, Amer Delić 4–6, 6–3, 6–4, world number 58 Benjamin Becker 7–5, 6–3, and world number 42 Arnaud Clément 7–6, 7–6. Reaching his first ATP quarterfinal—the only Australian to do so in Adelaide—Guccione continued his run and upset number 2 seed and world number 18 Richard Gasquet in the quarterfinals 1–6, 6–3, 7–6 to reach his first ATP semifinal. In the semi-finals, he defeated another first-time semifinalist, 92nd ranked Juan Martín del Potro 5–7, 6–3, 7–5, to reach his first ever career ATP tour final, where he lost to Novak Djokovic of Serbia in the final 6–3, 6–7, 6–4, ending his run of victories over top-100 ranked players at five.

After success at the Adelaide International Guccione reached a ranking of 107 in the world. Guccione began his second tournament of 2007 in the Medibank International beating Rafael Nadal in the first round. Leading 6–5 with Nadal to serve, Nadal withdrew due to an injury.

Guccione was unable to continue his success into the Australian Open, losing in the first round to Belgian Olivier Rochus 3–6, 7–6, 7–6, 6–7 9–7. Guccione's 2007 season then turned disastrous, not recording one win for over a month, Guccione then qualified for Las Vegas through a lucky loser handout. Guccione then qualified for the American double Tennis Masters Series, Indian Wells and Miami but was unable to get past the first round in both tournaments.

At the 2007 Wimbledon Championships, Guccione's first round match was against Great Britain's Alex Bogdanovic. Guccione won in straight sets 7–6, 6–4, 6–4. Chris Guccione's 2nd round match was against the 6th seed Russian Nikolay Davydenko. Guccione squandered a 2 sets to 0 lead, losing the match in 5 sets.

=== 2008 ===
Prior to the AO Series 2008, John Newcombe lashed out at Guccione for his lack of match fitness, saying that "with his height and his serve, he could be fucking lethal out there", and for not realising his considerable potential: "he should be top-30 in the world and trouble anyone if he was properly fit."

Guccione's 2008 AO campaign commenced at the 2008 Next Generation Adelaide International with a win over Wayne Odesnik. However, Guccione was unable to defend his 2007 runner-up points at the Next Generation Adelaide International, succumbing to second seed Paul-Henri Mathieu in the second round.

Guccione responded with a run at the Medibank International in Sydney. Guccione won his first match against qualifier world number 138 Alberto Martín. Despite Lleyton Hewitt's fantastic record against compatriot Australians, Guccione knocked him out in the second round. Showing signs of the form from the 2007 Next Generation Adelaide International, Guccione scalped world number 14 Tomáš Berdych and world number 32 Radek Štěpánek storming his way to the final against Dmitry Tursunov. However, his dream run came to a halt as he was edged out. Guccione was unable to replicate his form at the 2008 Australian Open, losing to Hyung-Taik Lee in straight sets.

The American Tennis Tournament Series kick started at the Regions Morgan Keegan Championships, Memphis, and Guccione defeated world number 117 Robert Kendrick and world number 54 Thomas Johansson. The Sydney rematch against world number 34 Radek Štěpánek in the quarter-finals went in favor of Stepanek.

Guccione failed to qualify for the Indian Wells Masters tournament. However, in the Sunrise challenger, a warm-up tournament for the Miami Masters, Guccione recorded his best ever win against world number 12 Fernando González in the semifinals. However, he was unable to continue his form as he failed to qualify for the Miami Masters. Despite this, Guccione rose to his highest career singles ranking of 67 on 7 April.

Following Guccione's U.S. stint, he returned to Australia for the Oceania qualifying Davis Cup tie against Thailand. Guccione opened the tie against Thai number 1 Dani Udomchoke and was taken to 5 sets before winning.

However Guccione was unable to carry on the momentum he had created over the past couple of months, losing in the first round of 7 of his next 8 tournament appearances including first round losses at Roland Garros and Wimbledon. Guccione finished the year ranked 96.

=== 2009 ===
Guccione's 2009 season started in poor fashion, losing to American Amer Delić in the first round of qualifying at the inaugural Brisbane International. Guccione had been upset prior to the commencement of the tournament after he had been shunned of a main draw wildcard in favor of younger players Bernard Tomic and Brydan Klein. After his match Guccione was too distraught to talk to the media.

However the following week at the 2009 Sydney International, Guccione bounced back with an impressive 6–3, 6–4 win over 6th seed Tomáš Berdych before going on to lose in the following round to eventual finalist Jarkko Nieminen, 7–6, 6–3.

Despite falling out of the top 100 after his loss in Sydney, Guccione went on to win his first match at the Australian Open since he made his debut in 2004, defeating Nicolas Devilder of France 6–4, 6–2, 6–4 before losing in four sets to 7th seed Gilles Simon in the second round.

Guccione teamed up with Lleyton Hewitt in March 2009 to play Thailand in the 2nd round of the Davis Cup Asia/Oceania Zone. After Hewitt lost to Danai Udomchoke in the 4th rubber, it was left to Guccione to defeat Kittiphong Wachiramanowong in the deciding match. He won 6–3, 7–5, 7–6, sending Australia into a 3rd round clash against India in May.

Guccione and George Bastl beat Andy Ram and Jonathan Erlich in doubles 7–5, 7–6, to win the final of the Israel Ramat HaSharon Challenger tournament in May 2009. He had reached the third round of the Cincinnati masters, defeating Philipp Kohlschreiber in the first round and world number 7 Jo-Wilfried Tsonga in the second. Guccione lost to Tomáš Berdych in the third round 4–6, 3–6, and then suffered an Achilles injury on the foot while playing doubles at Washington which affected his preparations before the US Open. He lost in the first round in singles to Pablo Cuevas. At the same tournament he reached his first Grand Slam quarterfinal partnering fellow Australian Carsten Ball as alternate pair where they lost to top seeds the Bryan brothers. The injury caused him to miss part of the 2010 season.

=== 2010 ===
After recovering from the Achilles injury that had Guccione sidelined for over 6 months, he had finally made his comeback appearance at the Wimbledon tune-up event; the 2010 Aegon Championships. He faced Dudi Sela in the opening round and lost in three tight sets.

=== 2011 ===
Guccione played a number of ATP Challenger Tour events in order to further recover from his Achilles injury and gain match fitness, in addition to entering both singles and doubles qualifying draws at majors. In doubles, he often paired with fellow Australian Carsten Ball and the pair won back-to-back titles in the Sacramento and Tiburon $100,000 Challenger events in October, in the latter tournament defeating a strong team of Sam Querrey and Steve Johnson 6–1, 5–7, [10–6].

=== 2016–2017 ===
Guccione reached two Major quarterfinals in doubles at the 2016 US Open with André Sá and the 2017 Australian Open with Sam Groth.

=== 2020 ===
Guccione made a return to tennis at the inaugural 2020 ATP Cup with a win in doubles with John Peers.

== ATP career finals ==
=== Singles: 2 (2 runners-up) ===
Legend Grand Slam tournaments (0–0) ATP World Tour Finals (0–0) ATP World Tour Masters 1000 (0–0) ATP World Tour 500 Series (0–0) ATP World Tour 250 Series (0–2)	Finals by surface Hard (0–2) Clay (0–0) Grass (0–0)	Finals by setting Outdoor (0–2) Indoor (0–0)

Result	W–L	Date	Tournament	Tier	Surface	Opponent	Score
Loss	0–1	Jan 2007	Adelaide International, Australia	International	Hard	(Serbia) Novak Djokovic	3–6, 7–6^{(8–6)}, 4–6
Loss	0–2	Jan 2008	Sydney International, Australia	International	Hard	(Russia) Dmitry Tursunov	6–7^{(3–7)}, 6–7^{(4–7)}

=== Doubles: 11 (5 titles, 6 runners-up) ===
Legend Grand Slam tournaments (0–0) ATP World Tour Finals (0–0) ATP World Tour Masters 1000 (0–0) ATP World Tour 500 Series (0–1) ATP World Tour 250 Series (5–5)	Finals by surface Hard (1–4) Clay (0–1) Grass (4–1)	Finals by setting Outdoor (5–5) Indoor (0–1)

Result	W–L	Date	Tournament	Tier	Surface	Partner	Opponents	Score
Win	1–0	Jul 2010	Hall of Fame Open, United States	250 Series	Grass	(Australia) Carsten Ball	(Mexico) Santiago González (United States) Travis Rettenmaier	6–3, 6–4
Win	2–0	Jul 2014	Hall of Fame Open, United States (2)	250 Series	Grass	(Australia) Lleyton Hewitt	(Israel) Jonathan Erlich (United States) Rajeev Ram	7–5, 6–4
Win	3–0	Jul 2014	Colombia Open, Colombia	250 Series	Hard	(Australia) Sam Groth	(Colombia) Nicolás Barrientos (Colombia) Juan Sebastián Cabal	7–6^{(7–5)}, 6–7^{(3–7)}, [11–9]
Loss	3–1	Sep 2014	Shenzhen Open, China	250 Series	Hard	(Australia) Sam Groth	(Netherlands) Jean-Julien Rojer (Romania) Horia Tecău	4–6, 6–7^{(4–7)}
Loss	3–2	Oct 2014	Kremlin Cup, Russia	250 Series	Hard (i)	(Australia) Sam Groth	(Czech Republic) František Čermák (Czech Republic) Jiří Veselý	6–7^{(2–7)}, 5–7
Win	4–2	Jun 2015	Nottingham Open, United Kingdom	250 Series	Grass	(Brazil) André Sá	(Uruguay) Pablo Cuevas (Spain) David Marrero	6–2, 7–5
Loss	4–3	Oct 2015	Shenzhen Open, China	250 Series	Hard	(Brazil) André Sá	(Israel) Jonathan Erlich (United Kingdom) Colin Fleming	1–6, 7–6^{(7–3)}, [6–10]
Loss	4–4	Jan 2016	Brisbane International, Australia	250 Series	Hard	(Australia) James Duckworth	(Finland) Henri Kontinen (Australia) John Peers	7–6^{(7–4)}, 6–1
Loss	4–5	Apr 2016	Romanian Open, Romania	250 Series	Clay	(Brazil) André Sá	(Romania) Florin Mergea (Romania) Horia Tecău	5–7, 4–6
Loss	4–6	Jun 2016	Queen's Club, United Kingdom	500 Series	Grass	(Brazil) André Sá	(France) Pierre-Hugues Herbert (France) Nicolas Mahut	3–6, 6–7^{(5–7)}
Win	5–6	Jul 2016	Hall of Fame Open, United States (3)	250 Series	Grass	(Australia) Sam Groth	(United Kingdom) Jonathan Marray (Canada) Adil Shamasdin	4–6, 3–6

== Performance timelines ==
Key
W	F	SF	QF	#R	RR	Q#	P#	DNQ	A	Z#	PO	G	S	B	NMS	NTI	P	NH

(W) winner; (F) finalist; (SF) semifinalist; (QF) quarterfinalist; (#R) rounds 4, 3, 2, 1; (RR) round-robin stage; (Q#) qualification round; (P#) preliminary round; (DNQ) did not qualify; (A) absent; (Z#) Davis/Fed Cup Zonal Group (with number indication) or (PO) play-off; (G) gold, (S) silver or (B) bronze Olympic/Paralympic medal; (NMS) not a Masters tournament; (NTI) not a Tier I tournament; (P) postponed; (NH) not held; (SR) strike rate (events won / competed); (W–L) win–loss record.
To avoid confusion and double counting, these charts are updated at the conclusion of a tournament or when the player's participation has ended.

=== Singles ===
Tournament	2004	2005	2006	2007	2008	2009	2010	2011	2012	SR	W–L
Grand Slam tournaments
Australian Open	2R	1R	1R	1R	1R	2R	A	Q1	Q1	0 / 6	2–6
French Open	A	2R	A	1R	1R	Q1	Q1	Q1	A	0 / 3	1–3
Wimbledon	A	Q2	Q1	2R	1R	Q1	Q1	Q3	A	0 / 2	1–2
US Open	Q3	Q1	A	1R	2R	1R	Q1	Q1	A	0 / 3	1–3
Win–loss	1–1	1–2	0–1	1–4	1–4	1–2	0–0	0–0	0–0	0 / 14	5–14

=== Doubles ===
Current through the 2020 Australian Open.

Tournament	2004	2005	2006	2007	2008	2009	2010	2011	2012	2013	2014	2015	2016	2017	2018	2019	2020	SR	W–L
Grand Slam tournaments
Australian Open	1R	1R	1R	1R	1R	3R	A	3R	1R	1R	1R	2R	1R	QF	A	A	2R	0 / 14	9–14
French Open	A	A	A	A	1R	A	1R	2R	A	A	1R	1R	3R	A	A	A	A	0 / 6	3–6
Wimbledon	A	A	A	A	A	2R	3R	2R	3R	2R	3R	1R	1R	A	A	A	NH	0 / 8	9–8
US Open	A	A	A	A	A	QF	1R	A	A	2R	2R	1R	QF	A	A	A	A	0 / 6	8–6
Win–loss	0–1	0–1	0–1	0–1	0–2	6–3	2–3	4–3	2–2	2–3	3–4	1–4	5–4	3–1	0–0	0–0	1–1	0 / 34	29–34
National representation
Summer Olympics	A	Not held			QF	Not held			A	Not held			1R	Not held				0 / 2	2–2
Davis Cup	1R	QF	SF	1R	PO	Z1	A	PO	PO	PO	1R	A	A	A	A	A	A	0 / 5	9–2
Career statistics
Titles	0	0	0	0	0	0	1	0	0	0	2	1	1	0	0	0	0	5	
Finals	0	0	0	0	0	0	1	0	0	0	4	2	4	0	0	0	0	11	
Overall win–loss	0–2	0–2	1–3	1–3	8–9	10–6	6–4	7–4	6–5	8–10	23–15	19–23	22–20	5–1	0–0	0–0	4–3	120–110	
Year-end ranking	531	233	220	471	238	67	129	98	150	82	38	59	42	170	N/A	N/A	294	52.17%	
