= 2010 ITF Women's Circuit =

Tennis tournament

Details
- Duration: 4 January – 26 December

Achievements (singles)

The 2010 ITF Women's Circuit was the 2010 edition of the second-tier tour for women's professional tennis. It was organised by the International Tennis Federation and was a tier below the WTA Tour. The ITF Women's Circuit included tournaments with prize money ranging from $10,000 up to $100,000. The list of tournaments is split into January–March, April–June, July–September and October–December due to the number of tournaments.

== Statistical Information ==
=== Key ===
$50,000 – $100,000 tournaments
$10,000 – $25,000 tournaments
All titles

=== Titles won by player ===
Total	Player	$50K–$100K		$10K–$25K		Total	
Total	Player	S	D	S	D	S	D
10	Renata Voráčová (CZE)	●	●●●	●●●●	●●	5	5
9	Mădălina Gojnea (ROU)			●●●●●●	●●●	6	3
9	Alexandra Cadanțu (ROU)			●●●●●	●●●●	5	4
9	Camila Silva (CHI)			●●●●	●●●●●	4	5
9	Erika Sema (JPN)		●	●●●	●●●●●	3	6
9	Karen Emilia Castiblanco Duarte (COL)			●	●●●●●●●●	1	8
9	Lucie Kriegsmannová (CZE)			●	●●●●●●●●	1	8
9	Irena Pavlovic (FRA)		●●		●●●●●●●	0	9
8	Lara Arruabarrena-Vecino (ESP)		●	●●●●●	●●	5	3
8	Roxane Vaisemberg (BRA)			●●●●	●●●	5	3
8	Marta Sirotkina (RUS)			●●●●	●●●●	4	4
8	Victoria Larrière (FRA)			●●●	●●●●●	3	5
8	Diana Enache (ROU)			●●	●●●●●●	2	6
8	Valentina Sulpizio (ITA)			●	●●●●●●●	1	7
8	Maria Fernanda Alves (BRA)				●●●●●●●●	0	8
8	Iveta Gerlová (CZE)				●●●●●●●●	0	8
7	Tímea Babos (HUN)			●●●●	●●●	4	3
7	Julia Glushko (ISR)			●●●●	●●●	4	3
7	Petra Cetkovská (CZE)	●	●●●	●●	●	3	4
7	Mihaela Buzărnescu (ROU)			●●	●●●●●	2	5
7	Verónica Cepede Royg (PAR)			●●	●●●●●	2	5
7	Nina Bratchikova (RUS)		●●	●●	●●●	2	5
7	Ana Clara Duarte (BRA)			●	●●●●●●	1	6
6	Chanel Simmonds (RSA)			●●●●●	●	5	1
6	Zuzana Zlochová (SVK)			●●●●	●●	4	2
6	Vanesa Furlanetto (ARG)			●●●	●●●	'3	3
6	Anastasia Grymalska (ITA)			●●●	●●●	3	3
6	Lee Jin-A (KOR)			●●●	●●●	3	3
6	Viktoria Kamenskaya (RUS)			●●●	●●●	3	3
6	Lucie Hradecká (CZE)	●●	●●●●			2	4
6	Marcella Koek (NED)			●●	●●●●	2	4
6	Tomoko Yonemura (JPN)		●●	●	●●●	1	5
6	Irina-Camelia Begu (ROU)		●	●	●●●●	1	5
6	Xu Yifan (CHN)		●		●●●●●	0	6
6	Emma Laine (FIN)				●●●●●●	0	6
6	Jessica Moore (AUS)				●●●●●●	0	6
5	Jamie Hampton (USA)	●●		●●	●	4	1
5	Patricia Mayr (AUT)	●●		●●	●	4	1
5	Liana Ungur (ROU)			●●●●	●	4	1
5	Johanna Larsson (SWE)		●	●●●	●	3	2
5	Mailen Auroux (ARG)			●●	●●●	2	3
5	Elena Bovina (RUS)			●●	●●●	2	3
5	Ulrikke Eikeri (NOR)			●●	●●●	2	3
5	Anaïs Laurendon (FRA)			●●	●●●	2	3
5	Ksenia Palkina (KGZ)			●●	●●●	2	3
5	Kim Kun-Hee (KOR)			●●	●●●	2	3
5	Vitalia Diatchenko (RUS)		●●●	●	●	1	4
5	Eva Birnerová (CZE)	●	●●		●●	1	4
5	Laura-Ioana Andrei (ROU)			●	●●●●	1	4
5	Megan Moulton-Levy (USA)		●●●●		●	0	5
5	Anna Smith (GBR)		●		●●●●	0	5
5	Olga Brózda (POL)				●●●●●	0	5
5	Martina Kubičíková (CZE)				●●●●●	0	5
4	Mathilde Johansson (FRA)	●●		●●		4	0
4	Anna Lapushchenkova (RUS)	●●		●●		4	0
4	Romina Oprandi (ITA)	●●		●●		4	0
4	Olivia Sanchez (FRA)	●		●●●		4	0
4	Magda Linette (POL)			●●●●		4	0
4	Edina Gallovits (ROU)	●●	●	●		3	1
4	Andrea Hlaváčková (CZE)		●	●●●		3	1
4	Paula Ormaechea (ARG)			●●●	●	3	1
4	Angelique van der Meet (NED)			●●●	●	3	1
4	Magali de Lattre (POR)			●●	●●	2	2
4	Federica Di Sarra (ITA)			●●	●●	2	2
4	Sandy Gumulya (INA)			●●	●●	2	2
4	Nadejda Guskova (RUS)			●●	●●	2	2
4	Melanie Klaffner (AUT)			●●	●●	2	2
4	Andrea Koch Benvenuto (CHI)			●●	●●	2	2
4	Iryna Kuryanovich (BLR)			●●	●●	2	2
4	Alizé Lim (FRA)			●●	●●	2	2
4	Evelyn Mayr (ITA)			●●	●●	2	2
4	Julia Mayr (ITA)			●●	●●	2	2
4	Anastasia Mukhametova (RUS)			●●	●●	2	2
4	Amra Sadiković (SUI)			●●	●●	2	2
4	Anastasiya Vasylyeva (UKR)			●●	●●	2	2
4	Scarlett Werner (GER)			●●	●●	2	2
4	Tamarine Tanasugarn (THA)		●●	●	●	1	3
4	Shuko Aoyama (JPN)		●	●	●●	1	3
4	Zhou Yi-Miao (CHN)		●	●	●●	1	3
4	Amanda Carreras (GBR)			●	●●●	1	3
4	Fernanda Faria (BRA)			●	●●●	1	3
4	Kumiko Iijima (JPN)			●	●●●	1	3
4	María Irigoyen (ARG)			●	●●●	1	3
4	Réka-Luca Jani (HUN)			●	●●●	1	3
4	Luksika Kumkhum (THA)			●	●●●	1	3
4	Yasmin Schnack (USA)			●	●●●	1	3
4	Nungnadda Wannasuk (THA)			●	●●●	1	3
4	Lindsay Lee-Waters (USA)		●●●●			0	4
4	Chen Yi (TPE)		●		●●●	0	4
4	Malou Ejdesgaard (DEN)				●●●●	0	4
4	Lena-Marie Hofmann (GER)				●●●●	0	4
4	Akari Inoue (JPN)				●●●●	0	4
4	Ionela-Andreea Iova (ROU)				●●●●	0	4
4	Florencia Molinero (ARG)				●●●●	0	4
4	Eugeniya Pashkova (RUS)				●●●●	0	4
4	Nicole Rottmann (AUT)				●●●●	0	4
4	Luciana Sarmenti (ARG)				●●●●	0	4
4	Maria Zharkova (RUS)				●●●●	0	4
3	Jelena Dokić (AUS)	●●●				3	0
3	Varvara Lepchenko (USA)	●●●				3	0
3	Rebecca Marino (CAN)	●●●				3	0
3	Alison Riske (USA)	●●●				3	0
3	Karolína Plíšková (CZE)	●●	●			3	0
3	Sachie Ishizu (JPN)			●●●		3	0
3	Valentyna Ivakhnenko (UKR)			●●●		3	0
3	Mona Barthel (GER)	●	●	●		2	1
3	CoCo Vandeweghe (USA)	●	●	●		2	1
3	Zhang Shuai (CHN)	●	●	●		2	1
3	Cristina Dinu (ROU)			●●	●	2	1
3	Andrea Gámiz (VEN)			●●	●	2	1
3	Macall Harkins (USA)			●●	●	2	1
3	Ons Jabeur (TUN)			●●	●	2	1
3	Lucía Jara-Lozano (ARG)			●●	●	2	1
3	Mandy Minella (LUX)			●●	●	2	1
3	Pemra Özgen (TUR)			●●	●	2	1
3	Adriana Pérez (VEN)			●●	●	2	1
3	Katarzyna Piter (POL)			●●	●	2	1
3	Zhang Ling (HKG)			●●	●	2	1
3	Julia Görges (GER)	●	●●			1	2
3	Elena Bogdan (ROU)	●	●		●	1	2
3	Eirini Georgatou (GRE)		●	●	●	1	2
3	Claudia Giovine (ITA)		●	●	●	1	2
3	Olivia Rogowska (AUS)		●	●	●	1	2
3	Lesia Tsurenko (UKR)		●	●	●	1	2
3	Fatma Al-Nabhani (OMA)			●	●●	1	2
3	Alexandra Artamonova (RUS)			●	●●	1	2
3	Elisa Balsamo (ITA)			●	●●	1	2
3	Gioia Barbieri (ITA)			●	●●	1	2
3	Kiki Bertens (NED)			●	●●	1	2
3	Martina Borecká (CZE)			●	●●	1	2
3	Casey Dellacqua (AUS)			●	●●	1	2
3	Fatima El Allami (MAR)			●	●●	1	2
3	Inés Ferrer Suárez (ESP)			●	●●	1	2
3	Anna Fitzpatrick (GBR)			●	●●	1	2
3	Fernanda Hermenegildo (BRA)			●	●●	1	2
3	Richèl Hogenkamp (NED)			●	●●	1	2
3	Oksana Kalashnikova (GEO)			●	●●	1	2
3	Lyudmyla Kichenok (UKR)			●	●●	1	2
3	Tatia Mikadze (GEO)			●	●●	1	2
3	Cristina Mitu (ROU)			●	●●	1	2
3	Alexandra Mueller (USA)			●	●●	1	2
3	Michaela Pochabová (SVK)			●	●●	1	2
3	Jessy Rompies (INA)			●	●●	1	2
3	Barbara Sobaszkiewicz (POL)			●	●●	1	2
3	Lavinia Tananta (INA)			●	●●	1	2
3	Janina Toljan (AUT)			●	●●	1	2
3	Maryna Zanevska (UKR)			●	●●	1	2
3	Alexandra Panova (RUS)		●	●●		1	2
3	Sharon Fichman (CAN)		●●●			0	3
3	Christina Fusano (USA)		●●		●	0	3
3	Mervana Jugić-Salkić (BIH)		●		●●	0	3
3	Sandra Klemenschits (AUT)		●		●●	0	3
3	Liu Wan-Ting (CHN)		●		●●	0	3
3	Kotomi Takahata (JPN)		●		●●	0	3
3	Abigail Spears (USA)		●		●●	0	3
3	Mashona Washington (USA)		●		●●	0	3
3	Akiko Yonemura (JPN)		●		●●	0	3
3	Monique Albuquerque (BRA)				●●●	0	3
3	Irina Buryachok (UKR)				●●●	0	3
3	Nicole Clerico (ITA)				●●●	0	3
3	Chang Kyung-mi (KOR)				●●●	0	3
3	Alexandra Damaschin (ROU)				●●●	0	3
3	Ayu-Fani Damayanti (INA)				●●●	0	3
3	Gally de Wael (BEL)				●●●	0	3
3	Amanda Elliott (GBR)				●●●	0	3
3	Elina Gasanova (RUS)				●●●	0	3
3	Paula Cristina Gonçalves (BRA)				●●●	0	3
3	Jana Jandová (CZE)				●●●	0	3
3	Jasmina Kajtazovič (BIH)				●●●	0	3
3	Diāna Marcinkēviča (LAT)				●●●	0	3
3	Anna Arina Marenko (RUS)				●●●	0	3
3	Teodora Mirčić (SRB)				●●●	0	3
3	Tammi Patterson (AUS)				●●●	0	3
3	Anastasia Pivovarova (RUS)				●●●	0	3
3	Raluca Elena Platon (ROU)				●●●	0	3
3	Peangtarn Plipuech (THA)				●●●	0	3
3	Jocelyn Rae (GBR)				●●●	0	3
3	Lisa Sabino (SUI)				●●●	0	3
3	Vivian Segnini (BRA)				●●●	0	3
3	Laura Siegemund (GER)				●●●	0	3
3	Melanie South (GBR)				●●●	0	3
3	Varatchaya Wongteanchai (THA)				●●●	0	3
3	Emilia Yorio (ARG)				●●●	0	3
2	Elena Baltacha (GBR)	●●				2	0
2	Anna Chakvetadze (RUS)	●●				2	0
2	Kaia Kanepi (EST)	●●				2	0
2	Junri Namigata (JPN)	●●				2	0
2	Sofia Arvidsson (SWE)	●		●		2	0
2	Johanna Konta (AUS)	●		●		2	0
2	Aleksandra Krunić (SRB)	●		●		2	0
2	Mirjana Lučić (CRO)	●		●		2	0
2	Zuzana Ondrášková (CZE)	●		●		2	0
2	Heather Watson (GBR)	●		●		2	0
2	Dijana Banoveć (CRO)			●●		2	0
2	Annalisa Bona (ITA)			●●		2	0
2	Çağla Büyükakçay (TUR)			●●		2	0
2	Martina Caregaro (ITA)			●●		2	0
2	Chan Yung-Jan (TPE)			●●		2	0
2	Lauren Davis (USA)			●●		2	0
2	Duan Yingying (CHN)			●●		2	0
2	Natsumi Hamamura (JPN)			●●		2	0
2	Michaela Hončová (SVK)			●●		2	0
2	Sacha Jones (NZL)			●●		2	0
2	Ivana Lisjak (CRO)			●●		2	0
2	Nudnida Luangnam (NED)			●●		2	0
2	Kim Na-ri (KOR)			●●		2	0
2	Gabriela Paz (VEN)			●●		2	0
2	Teliana Pereira (BRA)			●●		2	0
2	Conny Perrin (SUI)			●●		2	0
2	Nathalia Rossi (BRA)			●●		2	0
2	Anne Schäfer (GER)			●●		2	0
2	Tina Schiechtl (AUT)			●●		2	0
2	Stephanie Vogt (LIE)			●●		2	0
2	Sandra Záhlavová (CZE)			●●		2	0
2	Eleni Daniilidou (GRE)	●	●			1	1
2	Misaki Doi (JPN)	●	●			1	1
2	Polona Hercog (SLO)	●	●			1	1
2	Michaëlla Krajicek (CRO)	●	●			1	1
2	Anastasiya Yakimova (BLR)	●	●			1	1
2	Karin Knapp (ITA)		●	●		1	1
2	Ksenia Pervak (RUS)		●	●		1	1
2	María-Teresa Torró-Flor (ESP)		●	●		1	1
2	Lauren Albanese (USA)			●	●	1	1
2	Monique Adamczak (AUS)			●	●	1	1
2	Andrea Benítez (ARG)			●	●	1	1
2	Bianca Botto (PER)			●	●	1	1
2	Gail Brodsky (USA)			●	●	1	1
2	Ekaterina Bychkova (RUS)			●	●	1	1
2	Naomi Cavaday (GBR)			●	●	1	1
2	Julia Cohen (USA)			●	●	1	1
2	Benedetta Davato (ITA)			●	●	1	1
2	Nicola Geuer (GER)			●	●	1	1
2	Mélanie Gloria (CAN)			●	●	1	1
2	Paula Kania (POL)			●	●	1	1
2	Kim Ji-Young (KOR)			●	●	1	1
2	Nastja Kolar (SLO)			●	●	1	1
2	Sofiya Kovalets (UKR)			●	●	1	1
2	Nadia Lalami (MAR)			●	●	1	1
2	Elixane Lechemia (FRA)			●	●	1	1
2	Yuliana Lizarazo (COL)			●	●	1	1
2	Patricia Mayr (ITA)			●	●	1	1
2	Lara Michel (SUI)			●	●	1	1
2	Tara Moore (GBR)			●	●	1	1
2	Sofie Oyen (BEL)			●	●	1	1
2	Tamira Paszek (AUT)			●	●	1	1
2	Nathalie Piquion (FRA)			●	●	1	1
2	Ganna Piven (UKR)			●	●	1	1
2	Ingrid-Alexandra Radu (ROU)			●	●	1	1
2	Arina Rodionova (RUS)			●	●	1	1
2	Chanelle Scheepers (RSA)			●	●	1	1
2	Bibiane Schoofs (NED)			●	●	1	1
2	Julia Schruff (GER)			●	●	1	1
2	Sabina Sharipova (UZB)			●	●	1	1
2	Valeriya Solovyeva (RUS)			●	●	1	1
2	Romana Tabaková (SVK)			●	●	1	1
2	Tian Ran (CHN)			●	●	1	1
2	Wang Qiang (CHN)			●	●	1	1
2	Lenka Wienerová (SLO)			●	●	1	1
2	Zheng Saisai (CHN)			●	●	1	1
2	Zhu Lin (CHN)			●	●	1	1
2	Kristina Barrois (GER)		●●			0	2
2	Julie Ditty (USA)		●●			0	2
2	Stéphanie Foretz (FRA)		●●			0	2
2	Ekaterina Ivanova (RUS)		●●			0	2
2	Tetiana Luzhanska (UKR)		●●			0	2
2	Tatjana Malek (GER)		●●			0	2
2	Yvonne Meusburger (AUT)		●●			0	2
2	Sun Sheng-Nan (CHN)		●●			0	2
2	Bojana Bobusic (AUS)		●		●	0	2
2	Chan Chin-Wei (TPE)		●		●	0	2
2	Ekaterina Dzehalevich (BLR)		●		●	0	2
2	Arabela Fernández-Rabener (ESP)				●●	0	2
2	Rika Fujiwara (JPN)		●		●	0	2
2	Andreja Klepač (SLO)		●		●	0	2
2	Ksenia Lykina (RUS)		●		●	0	2
2	Justine Ozga (GER)		●		●	0	2
2	Ahsha Rolle (USA)		●		●	0	2
2	Maret Ani (EST)				●●	0	2
2	Maki Arai (JPN)				●●	0	2
2	Alice Balducci (ITA)				●●	0	2
2	Karen Barbat (DEN)				●●	0	2
2	Martina Caciotti (ITA)				●●	0	2
2	Mallory Cecil (USA)				●●	0	2
2	Rushmi Chakravarthi (IND)				●●	0	2
2	Chang Kai-chen (TPE)		●●			0	2
2	Stefania Chieppa (ITA)				●●	0	2
2	Daniella Dominikovic (AUS)				●●	0	2
2	Estefania Donnet (ARG)				●●	0	2
2	Alenka Hubacek (AUS)				●●	0	2
2	Justyna Jegiołka (POL)				●●	0	2
2	Moe Kawatoko (JPN)				●●	0	2
2	Nadiia Kichenok (UKR)				●●	0	2
2	Natalia Kołat (POL)				●●	0	2
2	Giulia Gatto-Monticone (ITA)				●●	0	2
2	Daniëlle Harmsen (NED)				●●	0	2
2	Camelia Hristea (ROU)				●●	0	2
2	Jade Hopper (AUS)				●●	0	2
2	Katarzyna Kawa (POL)				●●	0	2
2	Ivana King (USA)				●●	0	2
2	Magdalena Kiszczyńska (POL)				●●	0	2
2	Xenia Knoll (SUI)				●●	0	2
2	Daria Kuchmina (RUS)				●●	0	2
2	Quirine Lemoine (NED)				●●	0	2
2	Carla Lucero (ARG)				●●	0	2
2	Elizabeth Lumpkin (USA)				●●	0	2
2	Ksenia Milevskaya (BLR)				●●	0	2
2	Marija Mirkovic (AUS)				●●	0	2
2	Miki Miyamura (JPN)				●●	0	2
2	Federica Quercia (ITA)				●●	0	2
2	Polona Reberšak (SLO)				●●	0	2
2	Valeria Savinykh (RUS)				●●	0	2
2	Demi Schuurs (NED)				●●	0	2
2	Yurika Sema (JPN)				●●	0	2
2	Sofia Shapatava (GEO)				●●	0	2
2	Keren Shlomo (ISR)				●●	0	2
2	Sheila Solsona-Carcasona (ESP)				●●	0	2
2	Emelyn Starr (AUS)				●●	0	2
2	Ágnes Szatmári (ROU)				●●	0	2
2	Elise Tamaëla (NED)				●●	0	2
2	Andreea Văideanu (ITA)				●●	0	2
2	Aurélie Védy (FRA)				●●	0	2
2	Poojashree Venkatesha (IND)				●●	0	2
2	Jade Windley (GBR)				●●	0	2
2	Yang Zhaoxuan (CHN)				●●	0	2
2	Yu Min-Hwa (KOR)				●●	0	2
2	Dalia Zafirova (BUL)				●●	0	2
2	Nataša Zorić (SRB)				●●	0	2
1	Alberta Brianti (ITA)	●				1	0
1	Sania Mirza (IND)	●				1	0
1	Ayumi Morita (JPN)	●				1	0
1	Kurumi Nara (JPN)	●				1	0
1	Peng Shuai (CHN)	●				1	0
1	Urszula Radwańska (POL)	●				1	0
1	Evgeniya Rodina (RUS)	●				1	0
1	Yanina Wickmayer (BEL)	●				1	0
1	Klára Zakopalová (CZE)	●				1	0
1	Shiho Akita (JPN)			●		1	0
1	Martina Balogová (SVK)			●		1	0
1	Annika Beck (GER)			●		1	0
1	Yuliya Beygelzimer (UKR)			●		1	0
1	Raffaella Bindi (ITA)			●		1	0
1	Garbiñe Muguruza (ESP)			●		1	0
1	Klaudia Boczová (SVK)			●		1	0
1	Kateryna Bondarenko (UKR)			●		1	0
1	Estrella Cabeza Candela (ESP)			●		1	0
1	Myriam Casanova (SUI)			●		1	0
1	Marie Elise Casares (ECU)			●		1	0
1	Jana Čepelová (SVK)			●		1	0
1	Margalita Chakhnashvili (GEO)			●		1	0
1	Paola Cigui (ITA)			●		1	0
1	Valentine Confalonieri (ITA)			●		1	0
1	Leticia Costas Moreira (ESP)			●		1	0
1	Claire de Gubernatis (FRA)			●		1	0
1	Vlada Ekshibarova (UZB)			●		1	0
1	Irina Falconi (USA)			●		1	0
1	Jessica Ginier (FRA)			●		1	0
1	Camila Giorgi (ITA)			●		1	0
1	Sarah Gronert (GER)			●		1	0
1	Jarmila Groth (AUS)			●		1	0
1	Lauren Herring (USA)			●		1	0
1	Katharina Holert (GER)			●		1	0
1	Hsu Wen-hsin (TPE)			●		1	0
1	Ana Jovanović (SRB)			●		1	0
1	Vivien Juhászová (SVK)			●		1	0
1	Lenka Juríková (SVK)			●		1	0
1	Madison Keys (USA)			●		1	0
1	Alexis King (USA)			●		1	0
1	Danka Kovinić (MNE)			●		1	0
1	Makiho Kozawa (JPN)			●		1	0
1	Kristina Kučová (SVK)			●		1	0
1	Zuzana Kučová (SVK)			●		1	0
1	Lee Ye-Ra (KOR)			●		1	0
1	Nicha Lertpitaksinchai (THA)			●		1	0
1	Noppawan Lertcheewakarn (THA)			●		1	0
1	Oksana Lyubtsova (UKR)			●		1	0
1	Shayna McDowell (AUS)			●		1	0
1	Ani Mijačika (CRO)			●		1	0
1	Silvia Njirić (CRO)			●		1	0
1	Kaori Onishi (JPN)			●		1	0
1	Jelena Pandžić (CRO)			●		1	0
1	Despina Papamichail (GRE)			●		1	0
1	Sally Peers (AUS)			●		1	0
1	Gabriella Polito (ITA)			●		1	0
1	Laura Pous Tió (ESP)			●		1	0
1	Monica Puig (PUR)			●		1	0
1	Isabel Rapisarda-Calvo (ESP)			●		1	0
1	Anna-Giulia Remondina (ITA)			●		1	0
1	Élodie Rogge-Dietrich (FRA)			●		1	0
1	Aranza Salut (ARG)			●		1	0
1	Manana Shapakidze (GEO)			●		1	0
1	Constance Sibille (FRA)			●		1	0
1	Sílvia Soler Espinosa (ESP)			●		1	0
1	Milana Špremo (SRB)			●		1	0
1	Diana Stomlega (ROU)			●		1	0
1	Piia Suomalainen (FIN)			●		1	0
1	Zsófia Susányi (NED)			●		1	0
1	Anna Tatishvili (GEO)			●		1	0
1	Ajla Tomljanović (CRO)			●		1	0
1	Nazari Urbina (MEX)			●		1	0
1	Aki Yamasoto (JPN)			●		1	0
1	Zuzana Zálabská (CZE)			●		1	0
1	Bojana Jovanovski (SRB)			●		1	0
1	Kristie Ahn (USA)		●			0	1
1	Timea Bacsinszky (SUI)		●			0	1
1	Sarah Borwell (GBR)		●			0	1
1	Madison Brengle (USA)		●			0	1
1	Chuang Chia-jung (TPE)		●			0	1
1	Kimberly Couts (USA)		●			0	1
1	Jorgelina Cravero (ARG)		●			0	1
1	Jill Craybas (ARG)		●			0	1
1	Gabriela Dabrowski (CAN)		●			0	1
1	Alexandra Dulgheru (ROU)		●			0	1
1	Heidi El Tabakh (CAN)		●			0	1
1	Claire Feuerstein (FRA)		●			0	1
1	Stéphanie Foretz Gacon (FRA)		●			0	1
1	Tathiana Garbin (ITA)		●			0	1
1	Nicole Gibbs (USA)		●			0	1
1	Laura Granville (USA)		●			0	1
1	Anna-Lena Grönefeld (GER)		●			0	1
1	Carly Gullickson (USA)		●			0	1
1	Alina Jidkova (RUS)		●			0	1
1	Darija Jurak (CRO)		●			0	1
1	Anne Keothavong (GBR)		●			0	1
1	Raquel Kops-Jones (USA)		●			0	1
1	Mariya Koryttseva (UKR)		●			0	1
1	Tadeja Majerič (SLO)		●			0	1
1	Petra Martić (CRO)		●			0	1
1	Christina McHale (USA)		●			0	1
1	Asia Muhammad (USA)		●			0	1
1	Courtney Nagle (USA)		●			0	1
1	Monica Niculescu (ROU)		●			0	1
1	Ioana Raluca Olaru (ROU)		●			0	1
1	Maša Zec Peškirič (SLO)		●			0	1
1	İpek Şenoğlu (TUR)		●			0	1
1	Jasmin Wöhr (GER)		●			0	1
1	Elisabeth Abanda (CAN)				●	0	1
1	Nigina Abduraimova (UZB)				●	0	1
1	Kristina Antoniychuk (UKR)				●	0	1
1	Chen Astrogo (ISR)				●	0	1
1	Katerina Avdiyenko (UKR)				●	0	1
1	Émilie Bacquet (FRA)				●	0	1
1	Alison Bai (AUS)				●	0	1
1	Katarína Baranová (SVK)				●	0	1
1	Sabrina Baumgarten (GER)				●	0	1
1	Lina Bennani (MAR)				●	0	1
1	Audrey Bergot (FRA)				●	0	1
1	Yuliya Beygelzimer (UKR)				●	0	1
1	Sanaa Bhambri (IND)				●	0	1
1	Elyne Boeykens (BEL)				●	0	1
1	Barbara Bonić (SRB)				●	0	1
1	Brynn Boren (USA)				●	0	1
1	Anna Brazhnikova (SWE)				●	0	1
1	Fernanda Brito (CHI)				●	0	1
1	Naomi Broady (GBR)				●	0	1
1	Mhairi Brown (GBR)				●	0	1
1	Tatiana Búa (ARG)				●	0	1
1	Yana Buchina (RUS)				●	0	1
1	Ema Burgić (BIH)				●	0	1
1	Jacqueline Cako (USA)				●	0	1
1	Yvonne Cavallé Reimers (ESP)				●	0	1
1	Gabriela Cé (BRA)				●	0	1
1	Elena Chalova (RUS)				●	0	1
1	Stéphanie Cohen-Aloro (FRA)				●	0	1
1	Sophie Cornerotte (BEL)				●	0	1
1	Vasilisa Davydova (RUS)				●	0	1
1	Mariana Demichelli Vergara (PER)				●	0	1
1	Misleydis Díaz González (CUB)				●	0	1
1	Simona Dobrá (CZE)				●	0	1
1	Tomoko Dokei (JPN)				●	0	1
1	Veronika Domagala (POL)				●	0	1
1	Pilar Domínguez-López (ESP)				●	0	1
1	Mariana Duque Mariño (COL)				●	0	1
1	Natela Dzalamidze (RUS)				●	0	1
1	Başak Eraydın (TUR)				●	0	1
1	Yuliana Fedak (UKR)				●	0	1
1	Youlia Fedossova (FRA)				●	0	1
1	Sophie Ferguson (AUS)				●	0	1
1	Amanda Fink (USA)				●	0	1
1	Galina Fokina (RUS)				●	0	1
1	Yamile Fors Guerra (CUB)				●	0	1
1	Nikola Fraňková (CZE)				●	0	1
1	Kristy Frilling (USA)				●	0	1
1	Giulia Gabba (ITA)				●	0	1
1	Angelina Gabueva (RUS)				●	0	1
1	Andrea Gámiz (COL)				●	0	1
1	Myrtille Georges (FRA)				●	0	1
1	Anna Gerasimou (GRE)				●	0	1
1	Céline Ghesquière (FRA)				●	0	1
1	Martina Gledacheva (BUL)				●	0	1
1	Irina Glimakova (RUS)				●	0	1
1	Kim Grajdek (GER)				●	0	1
1	Federica Grazioso (ITA)				●	0	1
1	Flávia Guimarães Bueno (BRA)				●	0	1
1	Estelle Guisard (FRA)				●	0	1
1	Beatriz Haddad Maia (BRA)				●	0	1
1	Ham Mi-Rae (KOR)				●	0	1
1	Han Xinyun (CHN)				●	0	1
1	Florence Haring (FRA)				●	0	1
1	Angela Haynes (USA)				●	0	1
1	Eva Hrdinová (CZE)				●	0	1
1	Kazusa Ito (JPN)				●	0	1
1	Jeong Yoon-Young (KOR)				●	0	1
1	Ji Chun-Mei (CHN)				●	0	1
1	Karolina Jovanović (SRB)				●	0	1
1	Andrea Ka (FRA)				●	0	1
1	Yuliya Kalabina (RUS)				●	0	1
1	Dominika Kanaková (CZE)				●	0	1
1	Kao Shao-Yuan (TPE)				●	0	1
1	Veronika Kapshay (USA)				●	0	1
1	Maya Kato (JPN)				●	0	1
1	Kim Kilsdonk (NED)				●	0	1
1	Kim Jung-Eun (KOR)				●	0	1
1	Ksenia Kirillova (RUS)				●	0	1
1	Carmen Klaschka (GER)				●	0	1
1	Albina Khabibulina (UZB)				●	0	1
1	Karolina Kosińska (POL)				●	0	1
1	Tatiana Kotelnikova (RUS)				●	0	1
1	Kateryna Kozlova (UKR)				●	0	1
1	Svetlana Krivencheva (BUL)				●	0	1
1	Yevgeniya Kryvoruchko (UKR)				●	0	1
1	Aminat Kushkhova (UKR)				●	0	1
1	Irina Kuzmina (LAT)				●	0	1
1	Erica Krisan (USA)				●	0	1
1	Yurina Koshino (JPN)				●	0	1
1	Sofia Kvatsabaia (GEO)				●	0	1
1	Darya Kustova (BLR)				●	0	1
1	Zuzana Linhová (CZE)				●	0	1
1	Liu Shaozhuo (CHN)				●	0	1
1	Carmen López-Rueda (ESP)				●	0	1
1	Lu Jia-Jing (CHN)				●	0	1
1	Lu Jia Xiang (CHN)				●	0	1
1	Lu Jing-jing (CHN)				●	0	1
1	Sanaz Marand (USA)				●	0	1
1	Maria Masini (ITA)				●	0	1
1	Marlot Meddens (NED)				●	0	1
1	Leonie Mekel (NED)				●	0	1
1	Marina Melnikova (RUS)				●	0	1
1	Brandy Mina (FRA)				●	0	1
1	Giannina Minieri (CHI)				●	0	1
1	Isabela Miró (BRA)				●	0	1
1	Efrat Mishor (ISR)				●	0	1
1	Polina Monova (RUS)				●	0	1
1	Daniela Múñoz Gallegos (MEX)				●	0	1
1	Trudi Musgrave (AUS)				●	0	1
1	Ekaterina Nikitina (RUS)				●	0	1
1	Seiko Okamoto (JPN)				●	0	1
1	Chinami Ogi (JPN)				●	0	1
1	Seiko Okamoto (JPN)				●	0	1
1	Hiromi Okazaki (JPN)				●	0	1
1	Anna Orlik (BLR)				●	0	1
1	Shiho Otake (JPN)				●	0	1
1	Katarena Paliivets (CAN)				●	0	1
1	Olga Panova (RUS)				●	0	1
1	Julia Parasyuk (RUS)				●	0	1
1	Polina Pekhova (BLR)				●	0	1
1	Marie-Ève Pelletier (CAN)				●	0	1
1	Valeria Podda (NED)				●	0	1
1	Nantenaina Ramalalaharivololona (MDG)				●	0	1
1	Irina Ramialison (FRA)				●	0	1
1	Caroline Rohde-Moe (NOR)				●	0	1
1	Polina Rodionova (RUS)				●	0	1
1	Katie Ruckert (USA)				●	0	1
1	Elisa Salis (ITA)				●	0	1
1	Maria Sanchez (USA)				●	0	1
1	Sabrina Santamaria (USA)				●	0	1
1	Daniela Seguel (CHI)				●	0	1
1	Selima Sfar (TUN)				●	0	1
1	Sakiko Shimizu (JPN)				●	0	1
1	Isabella Shinikova (BUL)				●	0	1
1	Ekaterina Shulaeva (CAN)				●	0	1
1	Avgusta Shybysheva (RUS)				●	0	1
1	Chantal Škamlová (SVK)				●	0	1
1	Alyona Sotnikova (UKR)				●	0	1
1	Cristina Stancu (ROU)				●	0	1
1	Francesca Stephenson (GBR)				●	0	1
1	Elina Svitolina (UKR)				●	0	1
1	Blanka Szávay (HUN)				●	0	1
1	Tomoko Taira (JPN)				●	0	1
1	Nicole Thijssen (NED)				●	0	1
1	Anouk Tigu (NED)				●	0	1
1	Jasmina Tinjić (CRO)				●	0	1
1	Ellen Tsay (USA)				●	0	1
1	Avgusta Tsybysheva (RUS)				●	0	1
1	Story Tweedie-Yates (USA)				●	0	1
1	Nikola Vajdová (SVK)				●	0	1
1	Bernice van de Velde (NED)				●	0	1
1	Sabine van der Sar (NED)				●	0	1
1	Nicolette van Uitert (NED)				●	0	1
1	Vivienne Vierin (ITA)				●	0	1
1	Eva Wacanno (NED)				●	0	1
1	Emily Webley-Smith (GBR)				●	0	1
1	Ashley Weinhold (USA)				●	0	1
1	Caitlin Whoriskey (USA)				●	0	1
1	Ekaterina Yakovleva (RUS)				●	0	1
1	Wang Yafan (CHN)				●	0	1
1	Sandra Zaniewska (POL)				●	0	1
1	Maria-Letizia Zavagli (ITA)				●	0	1
1	Zhao Yi-Jing (CHN)				●	0	1
1	Hong Hyun-Hui (KOR)				●	0	1

=== Titles won by nation ===
Total	Nation	$50K–$100K		$10K–$25K		Total	
Total	Nation	S	D	S	D	S	D
87	Russia	7	9	22	47	29	58
67	Romania	3	6	28	30	31	36
64	United States	9	17	18	20	27	37
60	Italy	3	2	27	27	31	29
57	Czech Republic	9	8	18	21	27	30
52	France	3	7	19	23	23	29
49	Japan	5	4	17	23	22	27
38	Argentina	0	1	15	22	15	23
37	Germany	2	8	11	16	14	23
36	Ukraine	0	4	13	19	13	23
33	Brazil	0	0	13	20	13	20
31	Australia	4	2	8	17	12	19
31	Great Britain	2	3	6	20	8	23
30	Netherlands	1	1	11	17	12	18
28	Poland	1	0	11	15	12	16
27	People's Republic of China	2	2	9	14	111	16
25	Austria	2	3	10	10	12	13
24	Slovakia	0	0	17	7	17	7
19	Spain	0	2	11	6	11	8
18	South Korea	0	0	10	8	10	8
16	Thailand	0	2	6	8	6	10
15	Croatia	2	2	9	2	11	4
15	Belarus	1	3	2	8	3	11
14	Chile	0	0	7	7	7	7
13	Switzerland	0	1	6	6	6	7
13	Hungary	0	0	6	7	6	7
13	Canada	3	4	1	5	4	9
13	Serbia	1	0	6	6	7	6
13	Chinese Taipei	0	3	4	6	4	9
11	Georgia	0	0	5	4	6	5
10	Venezuela	2	0	4	4	6	4
10	Slovenia	1	3	2	4	3	7
10	Colombia	0	0	2	8	2	8
9	Israel	0	0	4	5	4	5
9	Indonesia	0	0	2	5	3	6
8	South Africa	0	0	6	2	6	2
8	Sweden	2	1	3	2	5	3
8	Greece	1	2	2	3	3	5
8	Belgium	1	0	2	5	3	5
7	Turkey	0	1	4	2	4	3
7	Paraguay	0	0	2	5	2	5
7	Finland	0	0	1	6	1	6
6	Morocco	0	0	2	4	2	4
6	Bosnia and Herzegovina	0	1	0	5	0	6
6	Denmark	0	0	0	5	0	6
5	Kyrgyzstan	1	0	2	2	2	3
5	Norway	0	0	2	2	2	3
5	Tunisia	0	0	2	3	2	3
5	Uzbekistan	0	0	2	3	2	3
4	Estonia	2	0	0	2	2	2
4	Portugal	0	0	2	2	2	2
4	Bulgaria	0	0	0	5	0	5
3	India	1	0	1	1	2	1
3	Hong Kong	0	0	2	1	2	1
3	Luxembourg	0	0	2	1	2	1
3	Latvia	0	0	1	2	1	2
3	Mexico	0	0	1	2	1	2
3	Oman	0	0	1	2	1	2
3	Peru	0	0	1	2	1	2
2	Liechtenstein	0	0	2	0	2	0
1	Montenegro	0	0	1	0	1	0
1	Puerto Rico	0	0	1	0	1	0
1	Ecuador	0	0	1	0	1	0
1	Cuba	0	0	0	1	0	1
1	Madagascar	0	0	0	1	0	1

== Retired players ==
Player	Born	Highest ranking		ITF titles	
Player	Born	Singles	Doubles	Singles	Doubles
(Russia) Vasilisa Davydova	6 February 1986	491	157	0	16
(Russia) Gulnara Fattakhetdinova	13 October 1982	246	102	2	11
(Greece) Anna Gerasimou	15 October 1987	200	201	7	3
(Russia) Raissa Gourevitch	1 March 1984	396	257	0	12
(India) Sai Jayalakshmy Jayaram	16 February 1977	331	249	4	25
(Serbia) Karolina Jovanović	13 February 1988	404	201	2	13
(Argentina) Erica Krauth	20 May 1981	229	103	2	23
(Republic of Ireland) Kelly Liggan	5 February 1979	181	113	4	7
(Armenia) Liudmila Nikoyan	1 August 1979	500	347	0	5
(Japan) Seiko Okamoto	14 March 1978	178	123	2	15
(Madagascar) Natacha Randriantefy	14 March 1978	325	173	1	8
(Mexico) Melissa Torres Sandoval	3 February 1984	227	207	6	6
(Portugal) Neuza Silva	4 May 1983	133	185	12	18
(Russia) Lioudmila Skavronskaia	23 March 1980	124	270	4	1
(Canada) Valérie Tétreault	21 January 1988	112	307	3	0
(Netherlands) Nicole Thyssen	5 June 1988	219	153	5	18

== Ranking Distribution ==
Description	W	F	SF	QF	R16	R32	QLFR	Q3	Q2	Q1
ITF $100,000 + H(S)	150	110	80	40	20	1	6	4	1	–
ITF $100,000 + H(D)	150	110	80	40	1	–	–	–	–	–
ITF $100,000 (S)	140	100	70	36	18	1	6	4	1	–
ITF $100,000 (D)	140	100	70	36	1	–	–	–	–	–
ITF $75,000 + H(S)	130	90	58	32	16	1	6	4	1	–
ITF $75,000 + H(D)	130	90	58	32	1	–	–	–	–	–
ITF $75,000 (S)	110	78	50	30	14	1	6	4	1	–
ITF $75,000 (D)	110	78	50	30	1	–	–	–	–	–
ITF $50,000 + H(S)	90	64	40	24	12	1	6	4	1	–
ITF $50,000 + H(D)	90	64	40	24	1	–	–	–	–	–
ITF $50,000 (S)	70	50	32	18	10	1	6	4	1	–
ITF $50,000 (D)	70	50	32	18	1	–	–	–	–	–
ITF $25,000 (S)	50	34	24	14	8	1	1	–	–	–
ITF $25,000 (D)	50	34	24	14	1	–	–	–	–	–
ITF $15,000 (S)	20	15	11	8	1	–	–	–	–	–
ITF $15,000 (D)	20	15	11	1	0	–	–	–	–	–
ITF $10,000 (S)	12	8	6	4	1	–	–	–	–	–
ITF $10,000 (D)	12	8	6	1	0	–	–	–	–	–

"+H" indicates that hospitality is provided.

== See also ==
- 2010 WTA Tour
- 2010 ATP World Tour
- 2010 ATP Challenger Tour
- Women's Tennis Association
- International Tennis Federation
