= Miles Armstrong =

Australian tennis player (born 1986)

- Country (sports): Australia
- Born: 16 April 1986 (age 40)
- Prize money: $ 45,245

Singles
- Career record: 0–0
- Career titles: 0
- Highest ranking: No. 268 (8 September 2008)

Doubles
- Career record: 0–0
- Career titles: 0
- Highest ranking: No. 318 (19 October 2009)
- Last updated on: 20 February 2017.

Miles Armstrong (born 16 April 1986) is a retired Australian tennis player. He now teaches at a regional school in Western Australia.

Armstrong has a career high ATP singles ranking of 268 achieved on 8 September 2008. He also has a career high doubles ranking of 318 achieved on 19 October 2009. Armstrong has won 1 ATP Challenger doubles title at the 2009 McDonald's Burnie International.

== Tour titles ==
Legend
Grand Slam (0)
ATP Masters Series (0)
ATP Tour (0)
Challengers (1)

=== Doubles ===
Result	Date	Category	Tournament	Surface	Partner	Opponents	Score
Winner	8 February 2009	Challenger	Burnie, Australia	Hard	(Australia) Sadik Kadir	(Australia) Peter Luczak / (Australia) Robert Smeets	6–3, 3–6, [10–7]
