= Sadik Kadir =

Australian tennis player

- Country (sports): Australia
- Born: 27 July 1981 (age 45) Surabaya, Indonesia
- Prize money: $115,240

Singles
- Highest ranking: No. 352 (21 June 2010)

Grand Slam singles results
- Australian Open: Q1 (2005)

Doubles
- Career record: 0–2
- Highest ranking: No. 134 (16 August 2010)

Grand Slam doubles results
- Australian Open: 1R (2005, 2006)

Sadik Kadir (born 27 July 1981) is a former professional tennis player from Australia.

== Biography ==
Originally from the Indonesian city of Surabaya, Kadir later grew up in Sydney.

Kadir made two main draw appearances at the Australian Open. At the 2005 Australian Open he and Shannon Nettle received a wild card for the men's doubles event. They were beaten in the first round by ninth seeds Cyril Suk and Pavel Vízner. He also featured in the main draw of the 2006 Australian Open, in the men's doubles with Todd Reid. Again facing an all Czech pairing in the opening round, Kadir and his partner narrowly lost to Ivo Minář and Jiří Vaněk.

In 2009 he won two ATP Challenger titles, the Burnie International in Tasmania and Karshi in Uzbekistan.

== Challenger titles ==
=== Doubles: (2) ===
No.	Year	Tournament	Surface	Partner	Opponents	Score
1.	2009	Burnie, Australia	Hard	(Australia) Miles Armstrong	(Australia) Peter Luczak (Australia) Robert Smeets	6–3, 3–6, [10–7]
2.	2009	Karshi, Uzbekistan	Hard	(India) Purav Raja	(Latvia) Andis Juška (Latvia) Deniss Pavlovs	6–3, 7–6^{(4)}
