= Joseph Sirianni =

Australian tennis player

- Country (sports): Australia
- Residence: Bali, Indonesia
- Born: 17 January 1975 (age 50); Melbourne, Australia
- Height: 1.75 m (5 ft 9 in)
- Turned pro: 1996
- Retired: 2011
- Plays: Right-handed (one-handed backhand)
- Prize money: $447,569

Singles
- Career record: 7–14 (ATP Tour level, Grand Slam level, and Davis Cup)
- Career titles: 0
- Highest ranking: No. 138 (20 October 2008)

Grand Slam singles results
- Australian Open: 2R (2003)
- French Open: Q2 (2008, 2009)
- Wimbledon: Q3 (2009)
- US Open: Q1 (2000, 2003, 2007, 2008, 2009)

Doubles
- Career record: 6–9 (ATP Tour level, Grand Slam level, and Davis Cup)
- Career titles: 0
- Highest ranking: No. 107 (23 November 2009)

Joseph Sirianni (born 17 January 1975) is a former Australian tennis player from Melbourne, Victoria. Sirianni was born to father Joseph and mother Ida. Sirianni turned professional in 1996 and he plays right-handed. He achieved his career-high singles ranking of World Number 138 on 20 October 2008. Sirianni has participated in the Australian Open on five occasions (1999, 2000, 2003, 2008, 2009).

== Career ==
=== 1999–2003 ===
Sirianni earned a wildcard into the main draw of the 1999 Australian Open Men's Singles Draw. While he lost in the first round to Mariano Zabaleta, the match went into a fifth set. Eventually, Zabaleta won 3–6, 6–4, 6–3, 4–6, 6–2.

At the 2000 Australian Open, Sirianni lost in the first round to Franco Squillari 6–3, 6–2, 6–1.

His best Australian Open result and first ATP match won came at the 2003 Australian Open. In the first round, Sirianni defeated Max Mirnyi 6–4, 6–4, 6–3. He lost in the second round to Mikhail Youzhny, who was the twenty-fifth seed, 6–2, 6–3, 6–3.

=== 2008 Australian Open campaign ===
Aged 32, Sirianni kicked off his Australian Open campaign with the wildcard playoffs. The 16 player round-robin style tournament consisted of 4 groups. Sirianni was placed within the likes of Colin Ebelthite, Andrew Coelho and Greg Jones. Sirianni topped the group without dropping a set, and he booked a semifinal match against Brydan Klein. Sirianni continued his run with a 6–4, 6–3 win, seeing him through to the final against Adam Feeney. Sirianni defeated Feeney 6–3, 4–6, 6–3, 6–4, earning Sirianni a wildcard into the 2008 Australian Open. Joe was drawn against Serbia's Janko Tipsarević in the first round of the 2008 Australian Open. Tipsarevic ranked No.47 in the ATP rankings was roughly 100 places higher than Sirianni. Joe pushed the Serb to five sets but eventually lost 5–7 2–6 7–6(6) 6–0 0–6.

=== Sirianni's run in 2008 AO Series ===
Sirianni also competed for a spot in the main draw of the 2008 Next Generation Adelaide International wildcard playoffs. Sirianni was seeded number two in the 8-player knockout-style tournament. Sirianni again defeated Andrew Coehlo and Greg Jones, thus qualifying for the final. Sirianni upset Alun Jones, the top seed, 4–6, 6–3, [10–5], in a match tiebreak. Siranni therefore earned a wildcard to the Adelaide tournament. Prior to Adelaide, Sirianni had only won one ATP match when he entered the tournament. Sirianni was a regular on the Challenger tour who had come off from back-to-back title wins in Caloundra and Brisbane with 15 wins out of 16 matches. Sirianni's first round match was against Adelaide's fifth seed, who was the injured world number 30 Radek Štěpánek. Sirianni led 7–6 (3), 4–3, before Stepanek retired. Taking his second ATP win, Joseph met Sam Querrey in the second round, where Sirianni recorded a maiden ATP quarter final with a 6–7(5), 6–2, 6–3 win. In the quarter-finals Sirianni met second seed and world No. 25 Paul-Henri Mathieu of France. Joseph prevailed in a tight third set tie-break to win 1–6 6–1 7–6(6) and book a place in the semi-finals. Sirianni's fairytale run ended succumbing against Michaël Llodra 6–3, 7–6(8). However, Sirianni's efforts earned him a special entry to the Medibank International and heralded the nickname 'Aussie Joe'. Sirianni was unable to continue his run, succumbing against qualifier Steve Darcis 1–6, 6–7(4).

=== After 2008 AO Series ===
Sirianni raising his ranking maintaining around the 150 mark was able to make the cut for most ATP Tournament Qualifying draws often being seeded. Playing in his first ATP main draw after the Australian Open Joe went through qualifying in the 2008 Dubai Tennis Championships. Sirianni was inconsistent on the Challenger circuit and went through qualifying in the 2008 Queen's Club Championships. He won his first round match against British wild card Alex Bogdanović 6–3 6–3.

=== 2009 Australian Open ===
Sirianni failed to qualify for the Singles event at the 2009 Australian Open. In the Doubles event, he and partner Andrew Coelho made it through to Round 3.

=== Post-career ===
In 2012, Sirianni joined Ana Ivanovic's team as a hitting partner.

== ATP titles ==
=== Singles wins ===
Legend (singles)
Grand Slam (0)
Tennis Masters Cup (0)
ATP Masters Series (0)
ATP Tour (0)
ITF (Challengers / Futures) (6)

No.	Date	Tournament	Tier	Surface	Opponent in the final	Score
1.	26 October 1998	Melbourne, Victoria, Australia	ITF	Clay	(Australia) Toby Mitchell	6–2, 6–4
2.	19 November 2001	Australia	ITF	Hard	(Australia) David McNamara	6–4, 6–2
3.	31 July 2006	Germany	ITF	Clay	(Argentina) Nicolás Todero	4–6, 6–4, 7–6^{(7–2)}
4.	21 August 2006	Netherlands	ITF	Clay	(Netherlands) Robin Haase	6–4, 4–6, 6–3
5.	19 November 2007	Caloundra, Queensland, Australia	ITF	Hard	(United States) Todd Widom	7–6 (2), 7–6^{(7–5)}
6.	26 November 2007	Brisbane, Queensland, Australia	ITF	Hard	(Japan) Go Soeda	1–6, 6–0, 6–3

=== 2008 Season schedule and results ===
Tennis Schedule:

- Adelaide International (31 December-6 January)
  - First Round: def. (Czech Republic) Radek Štěpánek, (seeded 5, ranked 30 for singles), 7–6 (3), 4–3, retired
  - Second Round: vs (United States) Sam Querrey (ranked 63 for singles), W 6–7(5) 6–2 6–3
  - Quarterfinal: vs (France) Paul-Henri Mathieu (seeded 2, ranked 25 for singles), W 1–6 6–1 7–6(6)
  - Semifinal: vs (France) Michaël Llodra (ranked 93 for singles), L 3–6 6–7(8)
- Sydney International (7–13 January)
  - First Round: vs (Belgium) Steve Darcis (ranked 88 for singles), L 1–6 6–7(4)
- Australian Open (14–27 January)
  - First Round: vs (Serbia) Janko Tipsarević (ranked 47 for singles), L 5–7 2–6 7–6(6) 6–0 0–6

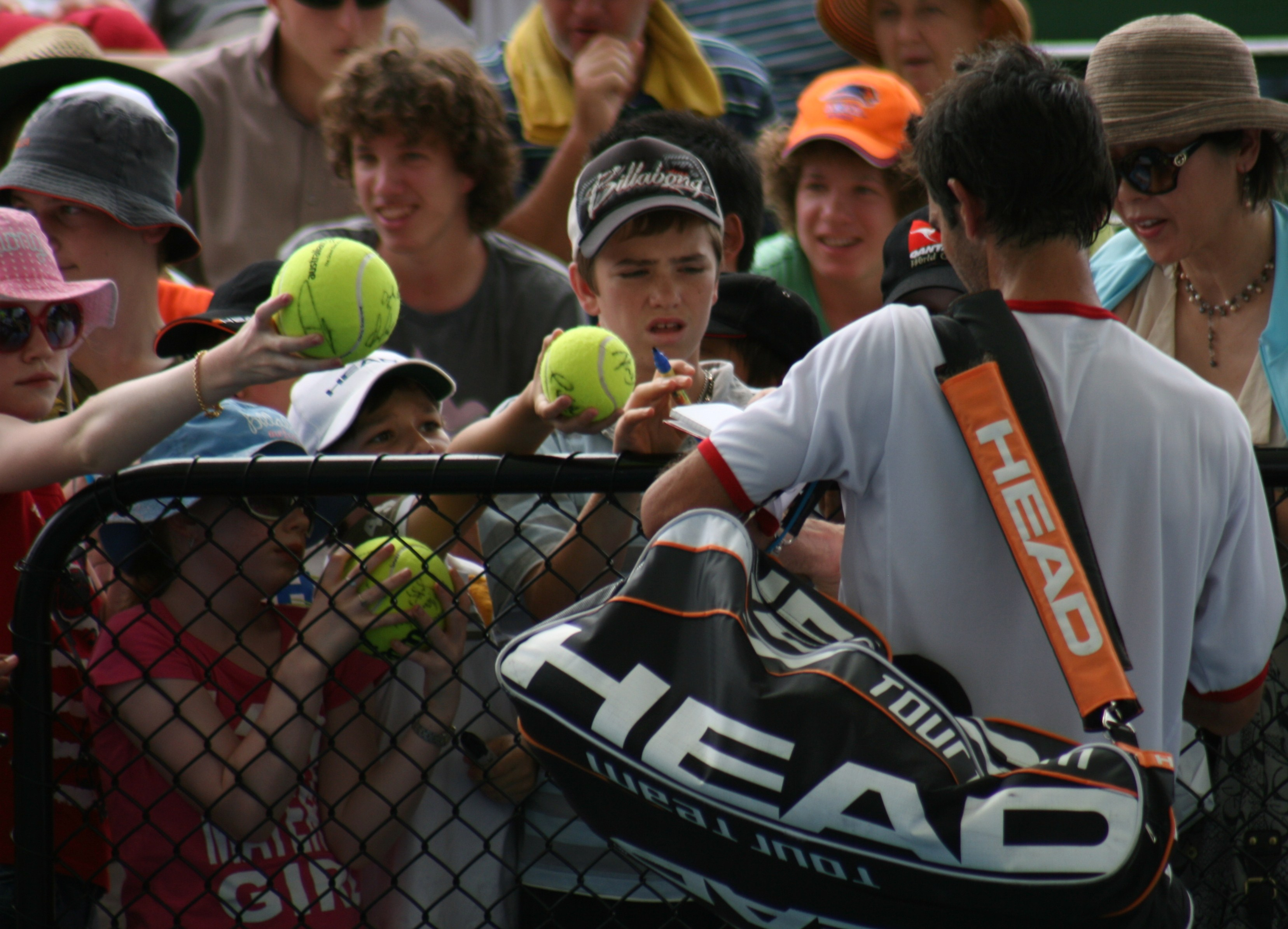
Melbourne's Joseph Sirianni finds his fans after an impressive win over Misha Sverev
