= Robert Smeets =

Australian tennis player

- Country (sports): Australia
- Residence: Brisbane, Queensland; Ipswich, Queensland
- Born: 10 November 1985 (age 39); Sliedrecht, Netherlands
- Height: 1.87 m (6 ft 2 in)
- Retired: 2011
- Plays: Left-handed (two-handed backhand)
- Prize money: $355,595

Singles
- Career record: 1–8 (ATP Tour and Grand Slam level, and in Davis Cup)
- Career titles: 0
- Highest ranking: No. 146 (15 September 2008)

Grand Slam singles results
- Australian Open: 2R (2007)
- French Open: 1R (2008)
- Wimbledon: Q2 (2008)
- US Open: 1R (2008)

Doubles
- Career record: 9–11 (ATP Tour and Grand Slam level, and in Davis Cup)
- Career titles: 0
- Highest ranking: No. 109 (27 November 2006)

Robert Smeets (born 10 November 1985) is an Australian retired professional tennis player. Though born in the Netherlands, Smeets moved to Australia aged 12 and took residency.

== Personal life ==
Smeets has two sisters, called Karin and Cheyenne. His mother is Jeannette and father, Joe. He lives in Brisbane.

== Tennis career ==
Smeets plays predominantly on the ATP Challenger Series and ITF Men's Circuit. However, he has enjoyed some success on the ATP Tour: at the 2008 Next Generation Adelaide International, he and Chris Guccione, as wildcards, reached the final of the doubles competition. On their way to the final they defeated number 2 seeds Andy Ram and Jonathan Erlich.

Smeets has also reached the second round of his home Grand Slam, the Australian Open, in 2007, by defeating Lukáš Lacko. Smeets reached the third round of the doubles competition, partnering Paul Baccanello in 2006.

In 2008 Smeets was granted a wildcard into the 2008 French Open main draw. He drew Tomáš Berdych, winning one game.

== ATP Tour finals ==
=== Doubles runners-up (1) ===
No.	Date	Tournament	Surface	Partner	Opponents in the final	Score
1.	6 January 2008	Adelaide, Australia	Hard	(Australia) Chris Guccione	(Argentina) Martín García (Brazil) Marcelo Melo	6–3, 3–6, [10–7]

== Singles titles (10) ==
Legend (singles)
Grand Slam (0)
ATP World Tour Masters 1000 (0)
ATP World Tour 500 (0)
ATP World Tour 250 (0)
ATP Challenger Tour (2)
ITF Futures (9)

No.	Date	Tournament	Surface	Opponent in the final	Score
1.	2 May 2005	Seogwipo	Hard	(United Kingdom) James Auckland	7–5, 6–3
2.	30 May 2005	Wuhan	Hard	(Israel) Ishay Hadash	7–6, 6–3
3.	19 September 2005	Rockhampton	Hard	(Australia) Luke Bourgeois	7–6, 2–6, 6–4
4.	10 October 2005	Queensland	Hard	(New Zealand) Mark Nielsen	7–5, 6–3
5.	12 February 2007	Wollongong	Hard	(Slovenia) Grega Žemlja	7–5, 6–1
6.	7 May 2007	Kuwait	Hard	(Kuwait) Mohammed Ghareeb	6–3, 6–2
7.	4 June 2007	Puerto Cruz	Carpet	(Spain) Guillermo Alcaide	6–4, 6–4
8.	6 August 2007	Wrexham	Hard	(Australia) Adam Feeney	6–4, 4–6, 6–4
9.	17 September 2007	Lubbock	Hard	(Serbia) Dušan Vemić	6–3, 7–6^{(9–7)}
10.	30 June 2008	Dublin	Hard	(Denmark) Frederik Nielsen	7–6^{(7–5)}, 6–2
11.	22 March 2009	Poitiers	Hard	(Germany) Dominik Meffert	6–4, 3–6, 6–3
