= 2011 Chang-Sat Bangkok Open =

- Date: 29 August – 4 September
- Edition: 3rd
- Location: Bangkok, Thailand

Champions

Singles
- (Germany) Cedrik-Marcel Stebe

Doubles
- (Canada) Pierre-Ludovic Duclos / (Italy) Riccardo Ghedin
← 2010 ·	Chang-Sat Bangkok Open	· 2012 →

The 2011 Chang-Sat Bangkok Open was a professional tennis tournament played on hard courts. It was the third edition of the tournament which was part of the 2011 ATP Challenger Tour. It took place in Bangkok, Thailand between 29 August and 4 September 2011.

== ATP entrants ==
=== Seeds ===
Country	Player	Rank^{1}	Seed
RSA	Rik de Voest	123	1
GER	Rainer Schüttler	124	2
RUS	Teymuraz Gabashvili	129	3
GBR	James Ward	139	4
GER	Cedrik-Marcel Stebe	152	5
RUS	Konstantin Kravchuk	159	6
JPN	Yūichi Sugita	174	7
ISR	Amir Weintraub	196	8

- ^{1} Rankings are as of August 22, 2011.

=== Other entrants ===
The following players received wildcards into the singles main draw:

- (Thailand) Kong Pop Lertchai
- (Thailand) Kirati Siributwong
- (Thailand) Peerakiat Siriluethaiwattana
- (Thailand) Kittipong Wachiramanowong

The following players received entry from the qualifying draw:

- (Canada) Érik Chvojka
- (Italy) Riccardo Ghedin
- (China) Gong Maoxin
- (China) Li Zhe

== Champions ==
=== Singles ===
(Germany) Cedrik-Marcel Stebe def. (Israel) Amir Weintraub, 7–5, 6–1

=== Doubles ===
(Canada) Pierre-Ludovic Duclos / (Italy) Riccardo Ghedin def. (United States) Nicholas Monroe / (France) Ludovic Walter, 6–4, 6–4
