= 2012 Chang-Sat Bangkok Open – Doubles =

Doubles
- 2012 Chang-Sat Bangkok Open

Final
- Champions: (India) Divij Sharan (India) Vishnu Vardhan
- Runners-up: (Chinese Taipei) Lee Hsin-han (Chinese Taipei) Peng Hsien-yin
- Score: 6–3, 6–4

Events
Singles	Doubles
← 2011 ·	Chang-Sat Bangkok Open	· 2013 →

Pierre-Ludovic Duclos and Riccardo Ghedin were the defending champions but decided not to participate.
Divij Sharan and Vishnu Vardhan defeated Lee Hsin-han and Peng Hsien-yin 6–3, 6–4 in the final to win the tournament.

== Seeds ==
1. (Finland) Harri Heliövaara / (Ukraine) Denys Molchanov (first round)
2. (India) Divij Sharan / (India) Vishnu Vardhan (champions)
3. (Chinese Taipei) Lee Hsin-han / (Chinese Taipei) Peng Hsien-yin (final)
4. (New Zealand) Jose Statham / (Thailand) Danai Udomchoke (first round)

== Draw ==
=== Key ===
- Q = Qualifier
- WC = Wild card
- LL = Lucky loser
- Alt = Alternate
- SE = Special exempt
- PR = Protected ranking
- ITF = ITF entry
- JE = Junior exempt
- w/o = Walkover
- r = Retired
- d = Defaulted
- SR = Special ranking

=== Draw ===
First round
1	(Finland) H Heliövaara (Ukraine) D Molchanov	7	3	[7]
(Chinese Taipei) L Huang (Indonesia) C Rungkat	6^{6}	6	[10]
(Australia) G Jones (Australia) J Millman	0	6	[11]
(Japan) Y Sugita (Japan) Y Uchiyama	6	3	[9]
3	(Chinese Taipei) H-h Lee (Chinese Taipei) H-y Peng	7	6
(Japan) T Matsui (Israel) A Weintraub	5	3
(China) M Gong (China) Z Zhang	6	6
(New Zealand) D King-Turner (New Zealand) A Sitak	0	1
(Chinese Taipei) T Chen (Australia) M Reid	6	5	[5]
(Slovakia) N Gombos (Germany) K Krawietz	3	7	[10]
(Israel) D Sela (Israel) H Srugo	4	6	[10]
4	(New Zealand) J Statham (Thailand) D Udomchoke	6	0	[3]
WC	(Thailand) W Doakmaiklee (Thailand) K Wachiramanowong	6	6
WC	(Thailand) Pin Mahathavorn (Thailand) Prach Mahathavorn	0	2
WC	(Thailand) Kirati Siributwong (Thailand) P Siriluethaiwattana	2	3
2	(India) D Sharan (India) V Vardhan	6	6

Quarterfinals
(Chinese Taipei) L Huang (Indonesia) C Rungkat	6	6
(Australia) G Jones (Australia) J Millman	4	2
3	(Chinese Taipei) H-h Lee (Chinese Taipei) H-y Peng	6	6
(China) M Gong (China) Z Zhang	2	3
(Slovakia) N Gombos (Germany) K Krawietz	1	2
(Israel) D Sela (Israel) H Srugo	6	6
WC	(Thailand) W Doakmaiklee (Thailand) K Wachiramanowong	5	4
2	(India) D Sharan (India) V Vardhan	7	6

Semifinals
(Chinese Taipei) L Huang (Indonesia) C Rungkat	3	6	[5]
3	(Chinese Taipei) H-h Lee (Chinese Taipei) H-y Peng	6	3	[10]
(Israel) D Sela (Israel) H Srugo	1	4
2	(India) D Sharan (India) V Vardhan	6	6

Final
3	(Chinese Taipei) H-h Lee (Chinese Taipei) H-y Peng	3	4
2	(India) D Sharan (India) V Vardhan	6	6
