= 2012 Chang-Sat Bangkok Open – Singles =

Singles
- 2012 Chang-Sat Bangkok Open

Final
- Champion: (Israel) Dudi Sela
- Runner-up: (Japan) Yuichi Sugita
- Score: 6–1, 7–5

Events
Singles	Doubles
← 2011 ·	Chang-Sat Bangkok Open	· 2013 →

Cedrik-Marcel Stebe was the defending champion but chose to participate at the 2012 US Open instead.
Dudi Sela won the final 6–1, 7–5 against Yuichi Sugita.

== Seeds ==
1. (Israel) Dudi Sela (champion)
2. (Thailand) Danai Udomchoke (first round)
3. (Japan) Yuichi Sugita (final)
4. (China) Zhang Ze (quarterfinals)
5. (Israel) Amir Weintraub (second round)
6. (Chinese Taipei) Chen Ti (first round)
7. (United Kingdom) James Ward (second round)
8. (Finland) Harri Heliövaara (first round)

== Draw ==
=== Key ===
- Q = Qualifier
- WC = Wild card
- LL = Lucky loser
- Alt = Alternate
- SE = Special exempt
- PR = Protected ranking
- ITF = ITF entry
- JE = Junior exempt
- w/o = Walkover
- r = Retired
- d = Defaulted
- SR = Special ranking

=== Finals ===
Semifinals
1	(Israel) Dudi Sela	6	6
Q	(Indonesia) Christopher Rungkat	3	1
3	(Japan) Yuichi Sugita	6	6
(China) Maoxin Gong	1	3

Final
1	(Israel) Dudi Sela	6	7
3	(Japan) Yuichi Sugita	1	5

=== Top half ===
First round
1	(Israel) D Sela	7	6
WC	(Thailand) P Siriluethaiwattana	5	2
Q	(Japan) K Takeuchi	2	1
WC	(Thailand) K Wachiramanowong	6	6
(Australia) J Millman	6
(Ukraine) D Molchanov	5^{r}
WC	(Thailand) W Sornbutnark	1	0
7	(United Kingdom) J Ward	6	6
4	(China) Z Zhang	3	6	7
Q	(Israel) H Srugo	6	0	5
Q	(South Korea) S-y Jeong	6	6
(New Zealand) J Statham	2	4
Q	(Indonesia) C Rungkat	2	6	7^{7}
(Japan) T Matsui	6	2	6^{3}
(Slovakia) I Klec	6	7
6	(Chinese Taipei) T Chen	3	5

Second round
1	(Israel) D Sela	6	6
WC	(Thailand) K Wachiramanowong	0	2
(Australia) J Millman	6	3	7
7	(United Kingdom) J Ward	3	6	5
4	(China) Z Zhang	6	6
Q	(South Korea) S-y Jeong	4	4
Q	(Indonesia) C Rungkat	6	6
(Slovakia) I Klec	2	0

Quarterfinals
1	(Israel) D Sela	6	6
(Australia) J Millman	4	4
4	(China) Z Zhang	6	4	4
Q	(Indonesia) C Rungkat	3	6	6

Semifinals
1	(Israel) D Sela	6	6
Q	(Indonesia) C Rungkat	3	1

=== Bottom half ===
First round
5	(Israel) A Weintraub	6^{4}	6	6
(Germany) Stefan Seifert	7^{7}	3	3
WC	(Thailand) Kong Pop Lertchai	2	4
(Australia) M Reid	6	6
(Italy) L Vanni	6	6
(New Zealand) D King-Turner	2	3
(Slovakia) N Gombos	1	3
3	(Japan) Y Sugita	6	6
8	(Finland) H Heliövaara	3	6	2
(Germany) K Krawietz	6	2	6
(Chinese Taipei) L Huang	6	4	6
(Australia) G Jones	4	6	3
(Japan) Y Uchiyama	7^{9}	7^{7}
(India) V Vardhan	6^{7}	6^{2}
(China) M-X Gong	7^{7}	4
2	(Thailand) D Udomchoke	6^{4}	1^{r}

Second round
5	(Israel) A Weintraub	4	6	6^{6}
(Australia) M Reid	6	4	7^{8}
(Italy) L Vanni	3	2
3	(Japan) Y Sugita	6	6
(Germany) K Krawietz	1	1
(Chinese Taipei) L Huang	6	6
(Japan) Y Uchiyama	5	3
(China) M-X Gong	7	6

Quarterfinals
(Australia) M Reid	2	2
3	(Japan) Y Sugita	6	6
(Chinese Taipei) L Huang	4	2
(China) M-X Gong	6	6

Semifinals
3	(Japan) Y Sugita	6	6
(China) M-X Gong	1	3
