= 2012 Chang-Sat Bangkok Open =

- Date: 27 August – 2 September
- Edition: 4th
- Surface: Hard
- Location: Bangkok, Thailand

Champions

Singles
- (Israel) Dudi Sela

Doubles
- (India) Divij Sharan / (India) Vishnu Vardhan
← 2011 ·	Chang-Sat Bangkok Open	· 2013 →

The 2012 Chang-Sat Bangkok Open was a professional tennis tournament played on hard courts. It was the fourth edition of the tournament which was part of the 2012 ATP Challenger Tour. It took place in Bangkok, Thailand between 27 August and 2 September 2012.

== Singles main-draw entrants ==
=== Seeds ===
Country	Player	Rank^{1}	Seed
ISR	Dudi Sela	110	1
THA	Danai Udomchoke	151	2
JPN	Yūichi Sugita	165	3
CHN	Zhang Ze	171	4
ISR	Amir Weintraub	202	5
TPE	Chen Ti	241	6
GBR	James Ward	250	7
FIN	Harri Heliövaara	252	8

- ^{1} Rankings are as of August 20, 2012.

=== Other entrants ===
The following players received wildcards into the singles main draw:

- (Thailand) Kong Pop Lertchai
- (Thailand) Peerakiat Siriluethaiwattana
- (Thailand) Warit Sornbutnark
- (Thailand) Kittipong Wachiramanowong

The following players received entry from the qualifying draw:

- (South Korea) Jeong Suk-young
- (Indonesia) Christopher Rungkat
- (Israel) Harel Srugo
- (Japan) Kento Takeuchi

== Champions ==
=== Singles ===
- (Israel) Dudi Sela def. (Japan) Yūichi Sugita, 6–1, 7–5

=== Doubles ===
- (India) Divij Sharan / (India) Vishnu Vardhan def. (Chinese Taipei) Lee Hsin-han / (Chinese Taipei) Peng Hsien-yin, 6–3, 6–4
