= 2011 Chang-Sat Bangkok Open – Doubles =

Doubles
- 2011 Chang-Sat Bangkok Open

Final
- Champions: (Canada) Pierre-Ludovic Duclos (Italy) Riccardo Ghedin
- Runners-up: (United States) Nicholas Monroe (France) Ludovic Walter
- Score: 6–4, 6–4

Events
Singles	Doubles
← 2010 ·	Chang-Sat Bangkok Open	· 2012 →

Gong Maoxin and Li Zhe were the defending champions, but Lee Hsin-han and Christopher Rungkat defeated them in the quarterfinals.
Pierre-Ludovic Duclos and Riccardo Ghedin won the title, defeating Nicholas Monroe and Ludovic Walter 6–4, 6–4 in the final.

== Seeds ==
1. (Thailand) Sanchai Ratiwatana / (Thailand) Sonchat Ratiwatana (first round)
2. (China) Gong Maoxin / (China) Li Zhe (quarterfinals)
3. (United States) John Paul Fruttero / (South Africa) Raven Klaasen (semifinals)
4. (South Africa) Rik de Voest / (United Kingdom) James Ward (first round)

== Draw ==
=== Key ===
- Q = Qualifier
- WC = Wild card
- LL = Lucky loser
- Alt = Alternate
- SE = Special exempt
- PR = Protected ranking
- ITF = ITF entry
- JE = Junior exempt
- w/o = Walkover
- r = Retired
- d = Defaulted
- SR = Special ranking

=== Draw ===
First round
1	(Thailand) Sa Ratiwatana (Thailand) So Ratiwatana	3	6	[9]
(Canada) P-L Duclos (Italy) R Ghedin	6	3	[11]
WC	(Thailand) W Doakmaiklee (Thailand) K Wachiramanowong	7	6
(Chinese Taipei) T Chen (Russia) T Gabashvili	5	4
3	(United States) JP Fruttero (South Africa) R Klaasen	6	6
(Japan) H Kondo (Thailand) D Udomchoke	1	3
(Japan) Hiroki Moriya (Japan) Y Sugita	6	3	[7]
(Finland) H Heliövaara (India) D Sharan	4	6	[10]
(New Zealand) J Statham (Germany) C-M Stebe	4	5
(United States) N Monroe (France) L Walter	6	7
WC	(Thailand) Kirati Siributwong (Thailand) P Siriluethaiwattana	7	6
4	(South Africa) R de Voest (United Kingdom) J Ward	5	3
WC	(Thailand) Kong Pop Lertchai (Thailand) Warit Sornbutnark	3	3
(Chinese Taipei) H-h Lee (Indonesia) C Rungkat	6	6
(Brazil) A Ghem (Israel) A Weintraub	3	2
2	(China) M Gong (China) Z Li	6	6

Quarterfinals
(Canada) P-L Duclos (Italy) R Ghedin	6	6
WC	(Thailand) W Doakmaiklee (Thailand) K Wachiramanowong	3	1
3	(United States) JP Fruttero (South Africa) R Klaasen	6	7^{7}
(Finland) H Heliövaara (India) D Sharan	4	6^{2}
(United States) N Monroe (France) L Walter	6	0	[10]
WC	(Thailand) Kirati Siributwong (Thailand) P Siriluethaiwattana	3	6	[7]
(Chinese Taipei) H-h Lee (Indonesia) C Rungkat	6	6
2	(China) M Gong (China) Z Li	3	3

Semifinals
(Canada) P-L Duclos (Italy) R Ghedin	6	3	[10]
3	(United States) JP Fruttero (South Africa) R Klaasen	3	6	[7]
(United States) N Monroe (France) L Walter	5	6	[10]
(Chinese Taipei) H-h Lee (Indonesia) C Rungkat	7	4	[5]

Final
(Canada) P-L Duclos (Italy) R Ghedin	6	6
(United States) N Monroe (France) L Walter	4	4
