= 2011 Chang-Sat Bangkok Open – Singles =

Singles
- 2011 Chang-Sat Bangkok Open

Final
- Champion: (Germany) Cedrik-Marcel Stebe
- Runner-up: (Israel) Amir Weintraub
- Score: 7–5, 6–1

Events
Singles	Doubles
← 2010 ·	Chang-Sat Bangkok Open	· 2012 →

Grigor Dimitrov was the defending champion, but chose to play in the US Open instead.
Cedrik-Marcel Stebe defeated Amir Weintraub 7–5, 6–1 to win the tournament.

== Seeds ==
1. (South Africa) Rik de Voest (first round)
2. (Germany) Rainer Schüttler (second round)
3. (Russia) Teymuraz Gabashvili (second round)
4. (United Kingdom) James Ward (quarterfinals)
5. (Germany) Cedrik-Marcel Stebe (champion)
6. (Russia) Konstantin Kravchuk (semifinals)
7. (Japan) Yuichi Sugita (second round)
8. (Israel) Amir Weintraub (final)

== Draw ==
=== Key ===
- Q = Qualifier
- WC = Wild card
- LL = Lucky loser
- Alt = Alternate
- SE = Special exempt
- PR = Protected ranking
- ITF = ITF entry
- JE = Junior exempt
- w/o = Walkover
- r = Retired
- d = Defaulted
- SR = Special ranking

=== Finals ===
Semifinals
8	(Israel) Amir Weintraub	6	6
6	(Russia) Konstantin Kravchuk	4	2
5	(Germany) Cedrik-Marcel Stebe	6	6
(Finland) Harri Heliövaara	0	3

Final
8	(Israel) Amir Weintraub	5	1
5	(Germany) Cedrik-Marcel Stebe	7	6

=== Top half ===
First round
1	(South Africa) R de Voest	4	1
(France) L Walter	6	6
Q	(Canada) É Chvojka	6	6
Q	(China) M Gong	3	0
(Japan) H Moriya	6	6
(Thailand) D Udomchoke	3	1
Q	(Italy) R Ghedin	3	0
8	(Israel) A Weintraub	6	6
4	(United Kingdom) J Ward	6	6
(United Kingdom) D Cox	4	0
(United Kingdom) J Baker	6	6
WC	(Thailand) K Wachiramanowong	3	2
(Canada) P-L Duclos	6	6
WC	(Thailand) Kong Pop Lertchai	1	2
(Chinese Taipei) T Chen	3	3
6	(Russia) K Kravchuk	6	6

Second round
(France) L Walter	7^{7}	3	2
Q	(Canada) É Chvojka	6^{3}	6	6
(Japan) H Moriya	5	4
8	(Israel) A Weintraub	7	6
4	(United Kingdom) J Ward	7^{7}	6
(United Kingdom) J Baker	6^{4}	3
(Canada) P-L Duclos	6^{5}	4
6	(Russia) K Kravchuk	7^{7}	6

Quarterfinals
Q	(Canada) É Chvojka	4	5
8	(Israel) A Weintraub	6	7
4	(United Kingdom) J Ward	3	3
6	(Russia) K Kravchuk	6	6

Semifinals
8	(Israel) A Weintraub	6	6
6	(Russia) K Kravchuk	4	2

=== Bottom half ===
First round
5	(Germany) C-M Stebe	2	7^{8}	6
(United States) N Monroe	6	6^{6}	0
WC	(Thailand) P Siriluethaiwattana	6	3	6
(New Zealand) M Venus	4	6	2
WC	(Thailand) Kirati Siributwong	3	5
(South Korea) Y-k Lim	6	7
(United Kingdom) J Milton	2	2
3	(Russia) T Gabashvili	6	6
7	(Japan) Y Sugita	6	6
(South Africa) R Klaasen	4	3
LL	(China) Z Zhang	4	5
Q	(China) Z Li	6	7
(Finland) H Heliövaara	1	6	6
(Uzbekistan) F Dustov	6	1	4
(Brazil) A Ghem	6	3	2
2	(Germany) R Schüttler	4	6	6

Second round
5	(Germany) C-M Stebe	6	6
WC	(Thailand) P Siriluethaiwattana	4	3
(South Korea) Y-k Lim	7	6
3	(Russia) T Gabashvili	5	2
7	(Japan) Y Sugita	3	6	6^{2}
Q	(China) Z Li	6	3	7^{7}
(Finland) H Heliövaara	6	4	7^{7}
2	(Germany) R Schüttler	4	6	6^{4}

Quarterfinals
5	(Germany) C-M Stebe	6	6
(South Korea) Y-k Lim	3	2
Q	(China) Z Li	1	1
(Finland) H Heliövaara	6	6

Semifinals
5	(Germany) C-M Stebe	6	6
(Finland) H Heliövaara	0	3
