= 2013 Chang-Sat Bangkok Open =

- Date: 26 August – 1 September
- Edition: 5th
- Surface: Hard
- Location: Bangkok, Thailand

Champions

Singles
- (Slovenia) Blaž Kavčič

Doubles
- (Chinese Taipei) Chen Ti / (Chinese Taipei) Huang Liang-chi
← 2012 ·	Chang-Sat Bangkok Open	· 2014 →

The 2013 Chang-Sat Bangkok Open was a professional tennis tournament played on hard courts. It was the fifth edition of the tournament which was part of the 2013 ATP Challenger Tour. It took place in Bangkok, Thailand between 26 August and 1 September 2013.

== Singles main-draw entrants ==
=== Seeds ===
Country	Player	Rank^{1}	Seed
SLO	Blaž Kavčič	125	1
AUS	Matthew Ebden	127	2
TPE	Jimmy Wang	139	3
JPN	Yūichi Sugita	148	4
JPN	Hiroki Moriya	181	5
AUS	Matt Reid	212	6
HUN	Márton Fucsovics	233	7
AUS	Benjamin Mitchell	260	8

- ^{1} Rankings are as of August 20, 2013.

=== Other entrants ===
The following players received wildcards into the singles main draw:

- (Thailand) Phassawit Burapharitta
- (Thailand) Chayanon Kaewsuto
- (Thailand) Warit Sornbutnark
- (Thailand) Kittipong Wachiramanowong

The following players received entry from the qualifying draw:

- (United States) Tyler Hochwalt
- (Uzbekistan) Temur Ismailov
- (India) Karunuday Singh
- (Thailand) Wishaya Trongcharoenchaikul

The following players received entry as a lucky loser into the main draw:

- (Thailand) Punn Bodhidatta
- (Uzbekistan) Sanjar Fayziev

== Champions ==
=== Singles ===
- (Slovenia) Blaž Kavčič def. (South Korea) Jeong Suk-young 6–3, 6–1

=== Doubles ===
- (Chinese Taipei) Chen Ti / (Chinese Taipei) Huang Liang-chi def. (South Korea) Jeong Suk-young / (South Korea) Nam Ji-sung 6–3, 6–2
