= 2013 Chang-Sat Bangkok Open – Doubles =

Doubles
- 2013 Chang-Sat Bangkok Open

Final
- Champions: (Chinese Taipei) Chen Ti (Chinese Taipei) Huang Liang-Chi
- Runners-up: (South Korea) Jeong Suk-young (South Korea) Nam Ji Sung
- Score: 6–3, 6–2

Events
Singles	Doubles
- Chang-Sat Bangkok Open

Divij Sharan and Vishnu Vardhan were the defending champions but decided not to participate.
Chen Ti and Huang Liang-Chi won the title over Jeong Suk-young and Nam Ji Sung 6–3, 6–2 in the final.

== Seeds ==
1. (Thailand) Sanchai Ratiwatana / (Thailand) Sonchat Ratiwatana (quarterfinals)
2. (Chinese Taipei) Lee Hsin-han / (Chinese Taipei) Peng Hsien-yin (quarterfinals)
3. (Australia) Matt Reid / (Chinese Taipei) Jimmy Wang (semifinals)
4. (Japan) Toshihide Matsui / (Thailand) Danai Udomchoke (quarterfinals)

== Draw ==
Key

- Q = Qualifier
- WC = Wild card
- LL = Lucky loser
- Alt = Alternate
- ITF = ITF entry
- PR = Protected ranking
- SR = Special ranking
- SE = Special exempt
- JE = Junior exempt
- JR = Junior Accelerator Programme entrant
- CO = College Accelerator Programme entrant
- NG = Next Gen Accelerator Program entrant
- w/o = Walkover
- r = Retired
- d = Defaulted

=== Draw ===
First round
1	(Thailand) Sa Ratiwatana (Thailand) So Ratiwatana	6	6
(Japan) Shuichi Sekiguchi (Japan) Y Sugita	1	1
(Slovakia) I Klec (Russia) A Kudryavtsev	4	1
(Chinese Taipei) T Chen (Chinese Taipei) L Huang	6	6
3	(Australia) M Reid (Chinese Taipei) J Wang	6	6
WC	(Thailand) Chayanon Kaewsuto (Thailand) Suthinan Tanthaseraneewat	3	3
(Japan) H Kondo (New Zealand) J Statham	6	6
WC	(Thailand) Jirayu Limpathum (Thailand) J Navasirisomboon	1	1
(South Korea) Kim Cheong-Eui (South Korea) J-w Na	6^{3}	6^{5}
(South Korea) S-y Jeong (South Korea) J-S Nam	7^{7}	7^{7}
WC	(Thailand) Watcharaphong Iamla-Or (Thailand) Chaleechan Tanasugarn	4	6	[8]
4	(Japan) T Matsui (Thailand) D Udomchoke	6	3	[10]
(Thailand) W Sornbutnark (Thailand) K Wachiramanowong	6	6
(United States) Tyler Hochwalt (India) Karunuday Singh	2	4
(Australia) A Bolt (Australia) B Mitchell	2	6^{9}
2	(Chinese Taipei) H-h Lee (Chinese Taipei) H-y Peng	6	7^{11}

Quarterfinals
1	(Thailand) Sa Ratiwatana (Thailand) So Ratiwatana	6	3	[8]
(Chinese Taipei) T Chen (Chinese Taipei) L Huang	4	6	[10]
3	(Australia) M Reid (Chinese Taipei) J Wang	5	7	[10]
(Japan) H Kondo (New Zealand) J Statham	7	5	[8]
(South Korea) S-y Jeong (South Korea) J-S Nam	6	1	[10]
4	(Japan) T Matsui (Thailand) D Udomchoke	4	6	[6]
(Thailand) W Sornbutnark (Thailand) K Wachiramanowong	2	7	[11]
2	(Chinese Taipei) H-h Lee (Chinese Taipei) H-y Peng	6	5	[9]

Semifinals
(Chinese Taipei) T Chen (Chinese Taipei) L Huang	6
3	(Australia) M Reid (Chinese Taipei) J Wang	4	r
(South Korea) S-y Jeong (South Korea) J-S Nam	6	6
(Thailand) W Sornbutnark (Thailand) K Wachiramanowong	2	2

Final
(Chinese Taipei) T Chen (Chinese Taipei) L Huang	6	6
(South Korea) S-y Jeong (South Korea) J-S Nam	3	2
