= 2013 Chang-Sat Bangkok Open – Singles =

Singles
- 2013 Chang-Sat Bangkok Open

Final
- Champion: (Slovenia) Blaž Kavčič
- Runner-up: (South Korea) Jeong Suk-Young
- Score: 6–3, 6–1

Events
Singles	Doubles
← 2012 ·	Chang-Sat Bangkok Open	· 2014 →

Dudi Sela was the defending champion but chose to participate at the 2013 US Open instead.
Top seed Blaž Kavčič won the title over surprise finalist Jeong Suk-Young 6–3, 6–1.

== Seeds ==
1. (Slovenia) Blaž Kavčič (champion)
2. (Australia) Matthew Ebden (semifinals, Retired)
3. (Chinese Taipei) Jimmy Wang (semifinals, Retired)
4. (Japan) Yūichi Sugita (quarterfinals)
5. (Japan) Hiroki Moriya (quarterfinals)
6. (Australia) Matt Reid (quarterfinals)
7. (Hungary) Márton Fucsovics (withdrew)
8. (Australia) Benjamin Mitchell (second round)

== Draw ==
=== Key ===
- Q = Qualifier
- WC = Wild card
- LL = Lucky loser
- Alt = Alternate
- SE = Special exempt
- PR = Protected ranking
- ITF = ITF entry
- JE = Junior exempt
- w/o = Walkover
- r = Retired
- d = Defaulted
- SR = Special ranking

=== Finals ===
Semifinals
1	(Slovenia) Blaž Kavčič	7^{7}	5
3	(Chinese Taipei) Wang Yeu-tzuoo	6^{4}	2^{r}
(South Korea) Jeong Suk-young	7^{9}	3	5
2	(Australia) Matthew Ebden	6^{7}	6	4^{r}

Final
1	(Slovenia) Blaž Kavčič	6	6
(South Korea) Jeong Suk-young	3	1

=== Top half ===
First round
1	(Slovenia) B Kavčič	7	6
(South Korea) J-w Na	5	1
LL	(Thailand) Punn Bodhidatta	1	4
(Japan) T Matsui	6	6
(Russia) A Kudryavtsev	2	7	7^{8}
(Slovakia) I Klec	6	5	6^{6}
WC	(Thailand) K Wachiramanowong	7^{10}	6
LL	(Uzbekistan) S Fayziev	6^{8}	1
3	(Chinese Taipei) J Wang	6	6
Q	(Thailand) W Trongcharoenchaikul	2	2
WC	(Thailand) Chayanon Kaewsuto	1	4
Q	(United States) Tyler Hochwalt	6	6
(New Zealand) J Statham	6	3	7
(United Kingdom) N Pauffley	4	6	1
Q	(Uzbekistan) T Ismailov	2	1
6	(Australia) M Reid	6	6

Second round
1	(Slovenia) B Kavčič	6	2
(Japan) T Matsui	4	1^{r}
(Russia) A Kudryavtsev	6	6
WC	(Thailand) K Wachiramanowong	4	2
3	(Chinese Taipei) J Wang	6	5	6
Q	(United States) T Hochwalt	2	7	2
(New Zealand) J Statham	6^{2}	2
6	(Australia) M Reid	7^{7}	6

Quarterfinals
1	(Slovenia) B Kavčič	6	7
(Russia) A Kudryavtsev	3	5
3	(Chinese Taipei) J Wang	6	6
6	(Australia) M Reid	3	0

Semifinals
1	(Slovenia) B Kavčič	7^{7}	5
3	(Chinese Taipei) J Wang	6^{4}	2^{r}

=== Bottom half ===
First round
8	(Australia) B Mitchell	6	6
(Japan) Shuichi Sekiguchi	4	0
(South Korea) S-Y Jeong	6	6
WC	(Thailand) W Sornbutnark	2	2
(Japan) Y Uchiyama	3	6	7^{7}
(Chinese Taipei) L-c Huang	6	0	6^{3}
Q	(India) Karunuday Singh	5	3
4	(Japan) Y Sugita	7	6
5	(Japan) H Moriya	6	6
WC	(Thailand) Phassawit Burapharitta	4	4
(South Korea) Kim Cheong-Eui	6	3	6^{1}
(Chinese Taipei) T Chen	4	6	7^{7}
(Australia) A Bolt	2	6^{5}
(Japan) H Kondo	6	7^{7}
(South Korea) J-S Nam	3	5
2	(Australia) M Ebden	6	7

Second round
8	(Australia) B Mitchell	2	1
(South Korea) S-Y Jeong	6	6
(Japan) Y Uchiyama	1	3
4	(Japan) Y Sugita	6	6
5	(Japan) H Moriya	6	6
(Chinese Taipei) T Chen	3	3
(Japan) H Kondo	3	0
2	(Australia) M Ebden	6	6

Quarterfinals
(South Korea) S-Y Jeong	6	6
4	(Japan) Y Sugita	1	3
5	(Japan) H Moriya	5	3
2	(Australia) M Ebden	7	6

Semifinals
(South Korea) S-Y Jeong	7^{9}	3	5
2	(Australia) M Ebden	6^{7}	6	4^{r}
