= 2010 Chang-Sat Bangkok Open – Singles =

Singles
- 2010 Chang-Sat Bangkok Open

Final
- Champion: (Bulgaria) Grigor Dimitrov
- Runner-up: (Russia) Konstantin Kravchuk
- Score: 6–1, 6–4

Events
Singles	Doubles
← 2009 ·	Chang-Sat Bangkok Open	· 2011 →

Florian Mayer chose to not defend his 2009 title.

Grigor Dimitrov won the title defeating Konstantin Kravchuk 6–1, 6–4 in the final.

== Seeds ==
1. (United States) Michael Russell (first round, retired)
2. (Japan) Go Soeda (semifinals)
3. (Germany) Denis Gremelmayr (second round)
4. (Russia) Konstantin Kravchuk (final)
5. (Australia) Matthew Ebden (first round, retired)
6. (France) Laurent Recouderc (second round)
7. (Bulgaria) Grigor Dimitrov (champion)
8. (Japan) Tatsuma Ito (quarterfinals)

== Draw ==
=== Key ===
- Q = Qualifier
- WC = Wild card
- LL = Lucky loser
- Alt = Alternate
- ITF = ITF entry
- PR = Protected ranking
- SR = Special ranking
- SE = Special exempt
- JE = Junior exempt
- JR = Junior Accelerator Programme entrant
- CO = College Accelerator Programme entrant
- NG = Next Gen Accelerator Program entrant
- w/o = Walkover
- r = Retired
- d = Defaulted

=== Finals ===
Semifinals
Q	(Germany) Sebastian Rieschick	6^{6}	7^{7}	3
4	(Russia) Konstantin Kravchuk	7^{7}	6^{4}	6
7	(Bulgaria) Grigor Dimitrov	6	6^{3}	6
2	(Japan) Go Soeda	3	7^{7}	0

Final
4	(Russia) Konstantin Kravchuk	1	4
7	(Bulgaria) Grigor Dimitrov	6	6

=== Top half ===
First round
1	(United States) M Russell	3	r
(United Kingdom) J Ward	6
(China) Z Zhang	5	2
(United States) A Bogomolov Jr.	7	6
Q	(Germany) S Rieschick	3	6	7^{8}
(Australia) N Lindahl	6	4	6^{6}
WC	(Thailand) P Siriluethaiwattana	1	2
6	(France) L Recouderc	6	6
4	(Russia) K Kravchuk	7^{7}
(Czech Republic) J Minář	6^{5}	r
Q	(Australia) B Tomic	6	7
(Russia) A Kumantsov	1	5
(South Korea) Y-j Kim	4	r
(Japan) Y Sugita	6
(United States) R DeHeart	2	5
8	(Japan) T Ito	6	7

Second round
(United Kingdom) J Ward	6	7^{10}
(United States) A Bogomolov Jr.	3	6^{8}
Q	(Germany) S Rieschick	7^{7}	6
6	(France) L Recouderc	6^{4}	1
4	(Russia) K Kravchuk	6	6
Q	(Australia) B Tomic	3	1
(Japan) Y Sugita	4	4
8	(Japan) T Ito	6	6

Quarterfinals
(United Kingdom) J Ward	4	4
Q	(Germany) S Rieschick	6	6
4	(Russia) K Kravchuk	6	2	6
8	(Japan) T Ito	3	6	3

Semifinals
Q	(Germany) S Rieschick	6^{6}	7^{7}	3
4	(Russia) K Kravchuk	7^{8}	6^{4}	6

=== Bottom half ===
First round
7	(Bulgaria) G Dimitrov	2	6	6
Q	(South Korea) J Woong-sun	6	0	1
(Russia) E Kirillov	6	6
Q	(China) G Mao-Xin	4	2
WC	(Russia) D Tursunov	7	6
WC	(India) Y Bhambri	5	1
WC	(Thailand) D Udomchoke	6	1	4
3	(Germany) D Gremelmayr	2	6	6
5	(Australia) M Ebden	2	6	r
(Denmark) F Nielsen	6	4
(Chinese Taipei) T-h Yang	1	5
(Germany) P Gojowczyk	6	7
(Japan) T Suzuki	1	2
(Russia) A Kudryavtsev	6	6
(United Kingdom) J Goodall	3	4
2	(Japan) G Soeda	6	6

Second round
7	(Bulgaria) G Dimitrov	6	6
(Russia) E Kirillov	4	3
WC	(Russia) D Tursunov	3	6	7^{8}
3	(Germany) D Gremelmayr	6	4	6^{6}
(Denmark) F Nielsen	6	4	5
(Germany) P Gojowczyk	3	6	7
(Russia) A Kudryavtsev	1	r
2	(Japan) G Soeda	3

Quarterfinals
7	(Bulgaria) G Dimitrov	7^{7}	6
WC	(Russia) D Tursunov	6^{4}	3
(Germany) P Gojowczyk	1	6^{3}
2	(Japan) G Soeda	6	7^{7}

Semifinals
7	(Bulgaria) G Dimitrov	6	6^{3}	6
2	(Japan) G Soeda	3	7^{7}	0
