= 2010 Chang-Sat Bangkok Open – Doubles =

Doubles
- 2010 Chang-Sat Bangkok Open

Final
- Champions: (China) Gong Maoxin (China) Li Zhe
- Runners-up: (India) Yuki Bhambri (United States) Ryler DeHeart
- Score: 6–3, 6–4

Events
Singles	Doubles
- Chang-Sat Bangkok Open

Joshua Goodall and Joseph Sirianni were the defending champions, but only Goodall competed that year.
He partnered with his compatriot Chris Eaton, but they lost to Matthew Ebden and James Ward in the quarterfinals.
The top-seeded Gong Maoxin and Li Zhe defeated Yuki Bhambri and Ryler DeHeart in the final 6–3, 6–4.

== Seeds ==
1. (China) Gong Maoxin / (China) Li Zhe (champions)
2. (Russia) Evgeny Kirillov / (Russia) Alexandre Kudryavtsev (first round)
3. (United Kingdom) Chris Eaton / (United Kingdom) Joshua Goodall (quarterfinals)
4. (Kazakhstan) Alexey Kedryuk / (Russia) Andrey Kumantsov (quarterfinals)

== Draw ==
Key

- Q = Qualifier
- WC = Wild card
- LL = Lucky loser
- Alt = Alternate
- ITF = ITF entry
- PR = Protected ranking
- SR = Special ranking
- SE = Special exempt
- JE = Junior exempt
- JR = Junior Accelerator Programme entrant
- CO = College Accelerator Programme entrant
- NG = Next Gen Accelerator Program entrant
- w/o = Walkover
- r = Retired
- d = Defaulted

=== Draw ===
First round
1	(China) M Gong (China) Z Li	6	6
WC	(Chinese Taipei) Y-l Chang (Thailand) KP Lertrchai	1	1
ALT	(China) W Di (China) Z Ze	6	6
(Japan) H Kondo (Japan) G Soeda	3	2
4	(Kazakhstan) A Kedryuk (Russia) A Kumantsov
(Germany) P Gojowczyk (Czech Republic) J Minář	w/o
WC	(Germany) S Rieschick (Thailand) D Udomchoke	6	7
(South Korea) Y-j Kim (Chinese Taipei) H-h Lee	4	5
(United States) A Bogomolov Jr. (Germany) D Gremelmayr	3	6^{5}
(Australia) M Ebden (United Kingdom) J Ward	6	7^{7}
(Denmark) F Nielsen (Japan) Y Sugita	3	5
3	(United Kingdom) C Eaton (United Kingdom) J Goodall	6	7
WC	(Thailand) K Siributwong (Thailand) P Siriluethaiwattana	4	3
(Chinese Taipei) T-h Yang (Chinese Taipei) C-h Yi	6	6
(India) Y Bhambri (United States) R DeHeart	6	6
2	(Russia) E Kirillov (Russia) A Kudryavtsev	2	6^{r}

Quarterfinals
1	(China) M Gong (China) Z Li	4	6	[10]
ALT	(China) W Di (China) Z Ze	6	4	[8]
4	(Kazakhstan) A Kedryuk (Russia) A Kumantsov	3	1
WC	(Germany) S Rieschick (Thailand) D Udomchoke	6	6
(Australia) M Ebden (United Kingdom) J Ward	6	6
3	(United Kingdom) C Eaton (United Kingdom) J Goodall	2	4
(Chinese Taipei) T-h Yang (Chinese Taipei) C-h Yi	2	6	[6]
(India) Y Bhambri (United States) R DeHeart	6	3	[10]

Semifinals
1	(China) M Gong (China) Z Li	6	6
WC	(Germany) S Rieschick (Thailand) D Udomchoke	2	2
(Australia) M Ebden (United Kingdom) J Ward	3	1
(India) Y Bhambri (United States) R DeHeart	6	6

Finals
1	(China) M Gong (China) Z Li	6	6
(India) Y Bhambri (United States) R DeHeart	3	4
