= 2010 Chang-Sat Bangkok Open =

2010 tennis tournament

- Date: 13–19 September 2010
- Edition: 2nd
- Location: Bangkok, Thailand

Champions

Singles
- (Bulgaria) Grigor Dimitrov

Doubles
- (China) Gong Maoxin / (China) Li Zhe
- Chang-Sat Bangkok Open

The 2010 Chang-Sat Bangkok Open was a professional tennis tournament played on Hard court. It was the second edition of the tournament which is part of the 2010 ATP Challenger Tour. It took place in Bangkok, Thailand between 13 and 19 September 2010.

== ATP entrants ==
=== Seeds ===
Nationality	Player	Ranking*	Seeding
USA	Michael Russell	80	1
JPN	Go Soeda	111	2
GER	Denis Gremelmayr	135	3
RUS	Konstantin Kravchuk	136	4
AUS	Matthew Ebden	162	5
FRA	Laurent Recouderc	180	6
BUL	Grigor Dimitrov	184	7
JPN	Tatsuma Ito	192	8

- Rankings are as of August 30, 2010.

=== Other entrants ===
The following players received wildcards into the singles main draw:

- (India) Yuki Bhambri
- (Thailand) Peerakiat Siriluethaiwattana
- (Russia) Dmitry Tursunov
- (Thailand) Danai Udomchoke

The following players received entry from the qualifying draw:

- (Germany) Sebastian Rieschick
- (South Korea) Jun Woong-sun
- (Australia) Bernard Tomic
- (China) Gong Maoxin

== Champions ==
=== Singles ===
(Bulgaria) Grigor Dimitrov def. (Russia) Konstantin Kravchuk, 6–1, 6–4

=== Doubles ===
(China) Gong Maoxin / (China) Li Zhe def. (India) Yuki Bhambri / (United States) Ryler DeHeart, 6–3, 6–4
