= Vishnu Vardhan =

Indian tennis player (born 1987)

- Country (sports): India
- Residence: Secunderabad
- Born: 27 July 1987 (age 39) Secunderabad, Andhra Pradesh, India
- Height: 1.88 m (6 ft 2 in)
- Turned pro: 2008
- Plays: Right-handed (Two-handed backhand)
- Coach: C.V. Nagraj
- Prize money: $268,431
- Official website: http://www.vishnu-vardhan.com/

Singles
- Career record: 1–4
- Career titles: 0
- Highest ranking: No. 262 (10 September 2012)
- Current ranking: No. 1067 (3 February 2025)

Doubles
- Career record: 4–12
- Career titles: 0
- Highest ranking: No. 92 (16 July 2018)
- Current ranking: No. 515 (3 February 2025)

Grand Slam doubles results
- Wimbledon: 2R (2018)
Medal record
Representing India
Men's tennis
Asian Games
Silver medal – second place	2010 Guangzhou	Mixed Doubles
Bronze medal – third place	2010 Guangzhou	Team
Asian Indoor and Martial Arts Games
Gold medal – first place	2017 Ashgabat	Mixed Doubles
South Asian Games
Gold medal – first place	2019 Kathmandu/Pokhara	Men's Doubles
Gold medal – first place	2019 Kathmandu/Pokhara	Men's team
- Last updated on: 3 February 2025.

Vishnu Vardhan (born 27 July 1987), also known as J. Vishnuvardhan, is an Indian professional tennis player. He won bronze medal in men's doubles at 2010 Asian games in Guangzhou, China. He paired-up with and Sania Mirza for mixed doubles and won silver medal at the same event. He was featured as ITF player of April 2011. He won the national singles title for the fourth time by winning the Men's final of Fenesta Open tennis Championship on 8 October 2016

== Personal life ==
Vishnuvardhan's father Mr Jagadeesan is a businessman. He started playing at the age of 9 and was greatly inspired by Leander Paes. He did his schooling from DAV Safilguda Hyderabad.

== Career ==
Vishnuvardhan was considered a promising prospect for Indian tennis, representing the next generation of the sport in the country and succeeding Leander Paes and Mahesh Bhupathi. He has represented India in the Davis Cup and was part of the team that defeated Uzbekistan and Philippines en route to qualifying for the World Group.

Vishnuvardhan began to show glimpses of his talent right from a young age, performing well on the junior circuit. The year 2003 proved to be his defining year on the junior circuit with Vishnuvardhan winning the Junior Nationals, and earning himself a place in the Indian Junior Davis Cup team. This success on the junior circuit translated itself into glory in Inter-University tournaments as well, with Vishnuvardhan capturing the gold medal in successive tournaments as the team captain.

Vishnuvardhan has won the Grass Court Nationals and achieving a career-high national ranking of two.

J.Vishnuvardhan won this first futures tournament on 11 July.

In 2012, Vishnu won the Zuari Garden City-ITF against Sriram Balaji 7–6(7), 6–3.

Vishnu won the Toyota Bangalore Open ITF in June 2012 by defeating Ti-Chen of Chinese Taipei 6–2, 4–6, 6–1.

Vishnu participated in the 2012 London Olympics in the Men's Doubles category partnering Leander Paes. Vishnu and partner Leander Paes crashed out of the Olympic doubles after a 7–6 (7/3), 4–6, 6–3 defeat against French Jo-Wilfried Tsonga and Michaël Llodra. Vishnu won the national singles title for the fourth time by winning the Men's final of Fenesta Open tennis Championship on 8 October 2016, by defeating left-hander Siddharth Vishwakarma from Varanasi 6–3, 6–4. For the year of 2018, Vishnu is focusing on doubles by partnering with Sriram Balaji with a goal of playing at the Wimbledon.

== Challenger and Futures finals ==
=== Singles: 24 (10–14) ===
Legend (singles) ATP Challenger Tour (0–0) ITF Futures Tour (10–14)	Titles by surface Hard (10–14) Clay (0–0) Grass (0–0) Carpet (0–0)

Result	W–L	Date	Tournament	Tier	Surface	Opponent	Score
Loss	0–1	Apr 2009	India F3, New Delhi	Futures	Hard	(India) Yuki Bhambri	6–7^{(1–7)}, 4–6
Win	1–1	Jul 2009	India F6, New Delhi	Futures	Hard	(India) Rohan Gajjar	6–4, 6–2
Loss	1–2	Aug 2009	India F7, New Delhi	Futures	Hard	(South Korea) Kim Young-jun	3–6, 6–7^{(3–7)}
Loss	1–3	Aug 2009	India F8, New Delhi	Futures	Hard	(India) Yuki Bhambri	4–6, 3–6
Loss	1–4	Apr 2010	India F3, Vijayawada	Futures	Hard	(India) Rupesh Roy	6–1, 4–6, 5–7
Loss	1–5	Aug 2010	Great Britain F12, London	Futures	Hard	(United Kingdom) Joshua Milton	6–7^{(4–7)}, 6–2, 3–6
Loss	1–6	Jan 2011	Cambodia F1, Phnom Penh	Futures	Hard	(Thailand) Danai Udomchoke	2–6, 3–6
Win	2–6	Apr 2011	India F3, Chandigarh	Futures	Hard	(India) Yuki Bhambri	4–6, 7–5, 6–3
Win	3–6	Apr 2011	India F4, Noida	Futures	Hard	(South Korea) Kim Young-jun	7–5, 3–6, 7–6^{(15–13)}
Loss	3–7	Apr 2011	India F5, Chennai	Futures	Hard	(Sweden) Patrik Rosenholm	6–5 ret.
Loss	3–8	Nov 2011	India F10, Pune	Futures	Hard	(India) Jeevan Nedunchezhiyan	4–6, 5–7
Win	4–8	Nov 2011	India F11, New Delhi	Futures	Hard	(India) Rohan Gajjar	6–4, 4–6, 6–4
Win	5–8	Apr 2012	Uzbekistan F2, Andijan	Futures	Hard	(Ukraine) Ivan Sergeyev	6–3, 7–6^{(7–1)}
Win	6–8	Jun 2012	India F8, Mysore	Futures	Hard	(India) Sriram Balaji	7–6^{(9–7)}, 6–3
Win	7–8	Jun 2012	India F9, Bangalore	Futures	Hard	(Chinese Taipei) Chen Ti	6–2, 4–6, 6–1
Loss	7–9	Feb 2014	India F1, Chandigarh	Futures	Hard	(Netherlands) Antal van der Duim	5–7, 3–6
Loss	7–10	May 2015	India F6, Mysore	Futures	Hard	(India) Ramkumar Ramanathan	6–7^{(2–7)}, 6–3, 3–6
Loss	7–11	Jun 2015	India F9, Hyderabad	Futures	Hard (i)	(France) Antoine Escoffier	6–7^{(4–7)}, 2–6
Loss	7–12	Jul 2015	India F10, Hyderabad	Futures	Hard (i)	(France) Antoine Escoffier	2–6, 6–7^{(3–7)}
Loss	7–13	Sep 2015	India F15, Madurai	Futures	Hard	(India) Sumit Nagal	6–7^{(5–7)}, 6–7^{(4–7)}
Win	8–13	Apr 2016	India F1, Chandigarh	Futures	Hard	(Indonesia) David Agung Susanto	6–3, 3–6, 6–1
Win	9–13	May 2016	India F3, Jassowal	Futures	Hard	(India) Dalwinder Singh	7–6^{(7–4)}, 6–4
Win	10–13	Sep 2016	India F5, Chennai	Futures	Hard	(India) Sriram Balaji	6–4, 6–3
Loss	10–14	Feb 2017	India F2, Jorhat	Futures	Hard	(India) Sriram Balaji	2–6, 6–7^{(1–7)}

=== Doubles: 82 (47–35) ===
Legend (doubles) ATP Challenger Tour (8–11) ITF Futures/World Tennis Tour (39–24)	Titles by surface Hard (40–29) Clay (5–4) Grass (2–1) Carpet (0–1)

Result	W–L	Date	Tournament	Tier	Surface	Partner	Opponents	Score
Loss	0–1	Mar 2008	India F4, Gurgaon	Futures	Hard	(India) Divij Sharan	(Chinese Taipei) Lee Hsin-han (China) Wang Yu jr.	6–7^{(4–7)}, 4–6
Win	1–1	Sep 2008	India F6, Chennai	Futures	Clay	(India) Divij Sharan	(India) Ashutosh Singh (India) Sunil-Kumar Sipaeya	6–3, 4–6, [10–7]
Loss	1–2	Sep 2008	India F7, New Delhi	Futures	Hard	(India) Divij Sharan	(India) Ashutosh Singh (India) Sunil-Kumar Sipaeya	2–6, 2–6
Win	2–2	Mar 2009	India F1, Chandigarh	Futures	Hard	(India) Divij Sharan	(India) Mithun Murali (India) Vijay Sundar Prashanth	4–6, 7–5, [10–7]
Win	3–2	May 2009	India F4, New Delhi	Futures	Hard	(India) Divij Sharan	(India) Tushar Liberhan (India) Vishal Punna	6–1, 6–3
Win	4–2	Jul 2009	India F5, New Delhi	Futures	Hard	(India) Divij Sharan	(India) Rohan Gajjar (India) Purav Raja	6–1, 7–5
Win	5–2	Jul 2009	India F6, New Delhi	Futures	Hard	(India) Divij Sharan	(India) Vivek Shokeen (India) Ashutosh Singh	6–3, 6–4
Win	6–2	Aug 2009	India F7, New Delhi	Futures	Hard	(India) Ashutosh Singh	(United Kingdom) Chris Eaton (United Kingdom) Sean Thornley	6–3, 6–7^{(5–7)}, [10–8]
Loss	6–3	Aug 2009	India F9, New Delhi	Futures	Hard	(India) Ashutosh Singh	(United Kingdom) Chris Eaton (India) Rohan Gajjar	6–7^{(6–8)}, 6–7^{(3–7)}
Loss	6–4	Oct 2009	India F10, Kolkata	Futures	Hard	(India) Divij Sharan	(India) Rohan Gajjar (India) Purav Raja	4–6, 5–7
Win	7–4	Oct 2009	India F11, Pune	Futures	Hard	(India) Divij Sharan	(India) Rohan Gajjar (India) Purav Raja	7–5, 6–3
Loss	7–5	Mar 2010	Kyoto, Japan	Challenger	Carpet (i)	(India) Divij Sharan	(Austria) Martin Fischer (Austria) Philipp Oswald	1–6, 2–6
Loss	7–6	Mar 2010	India F1, Kolkata	Futures	Hard	(India) Divij Sharan	(India) Vivek Shokeen (India) Ashutosh Singh	3–6, 2–6
Win	8–6	Apr 2010	India F3, Vijayawada	Futures	Hard	(India) Divij Sharan	(India) Sriram Balaji (India) Vignesh Peranamallur	2–6, 6–3, [10–3]
Win	9–6	Jul 2010	Great Britain F8, Manchester	Futures	Grass	(India) Divij Sharan	(Republic of Ireland) Barry King (United States) Ashwin Kumar	6–2, 7–5
Loss	9–7	Jul 2010	Great Britain F9, Ilkley	Futures	Grass	(India) Divij Sharan	(United Kingdom) Andrew Fitzpatrick (United Kingdom) Josh Goodall	6–3, 5–7, [3–10]
Win	10–7	Jul 2010	Great Britain F11, Chiswick	Futures	Hard	(India) Divij Sharan	(United Kingdom) James Chaudry (United Kingdom) George Coupland	6–2, 6–2
Loss	10–8	Aug 2010	Karshi, Uzbekistan	Challenger	Hard	(India) Divij Sharan	(China) Gong Maoxin (China) Li Zhe	3–6, 1–6
Loss	10–9	Oct 2010	Spain F35, Martos	Futures	Hard	(India) Divij Sharan	(Spain) Agustín Boje-Ordóñez (Spain) Pablo Martín-Adalia	6–3, 6–7^{(2–7)}, [8–10]
Loss	10–10	Jan 2011	Cambodia F1, Phnom Penh	Futures	Hard	(India) Divij Sharan	(Thailand) Danai Udomchoke (Thailand) Kittiphong Wachiramanowong	4–6, 4–6
Win	11–10	Mar 2011	Australia F2, Berri	Futures	Grass	(India) Divij Sharan	(Australia) Chris Letcher (Australia) Brendan Moore	4–6, 6–3, [10–8]
Win	12–10	Mar 2011	India F2, Kolkata	Futures	Clay	(India) Divij Sharan	(India) Sriram Balaji (India) Ashutosh Singh	7–6^{(7–1)}, 7–6^{(7–5)}
Win	13–10	Apr 2011	India F3, Chandigarh	Futures	Hard	(India) Divij Sharan	(Chinese Taipei) Lee Hsin-han (Japan) Bumpei Sato	6–4, 4–6, [10–7]
Win	14–10	Aug 2011	Astana, Kazakhstan	Challenger	Hard (i)	(India) Karan Rastogi	(Finland) Harri Heliövaara (Ukraine) Denys Molchanov	7–6^{(7–3)}, 2–6, [10–8]
Loss	14–11	Oct 2011	Nigeria F3, Lagos	Futures	Hard	(India) Karan Rastogi	(India) Yuki Bhambri (India) Ranjeet Virali-Murugesan	2–6, 5–7
Loss	14–12	Nov 2011	India F10, Pune	Futures	Hard	(India) Karan Rastogi	(India) Rohan Gajjar (Germany) Alexander Satschko	6–4, 6–7^{(1–7)}, [8–10]
Win	15–12	Nov 2011	India F11, New Delhi	Futures	Hard	(India) Karan Rastogi	(India) Sriram Balaji (India) Vijayant Malik	6–1, 6–3
Loss	15–13	Feb 2012	Burnie, Australia	Challenger	Hard	(India) Divij Sharan	(Australia) John Peers (Australia) John-Patrick Smith	2–6, 4–6
Loss	15–14	Aug 2012	Samarkand, Uzbekistan	Challenger	Clay	(India) Divij Sharan	(Ukraine) Oleksandr Nedovyesov (Ukraine) Ivan Sergeyev	4–6, 6–7^{(1–7)}
Win	16–14	Sep 2012	Bangkok, Thailand	Challenger	Hard	(India) Divij Sharan	(Chinese Taipei) Lee Hsin-han (Chinese Taipei) Peng Hsien-yin	6–3, 6–4
Loss	16–15	May 2013	India F4, Chandigarh	Futures	Hard	(India) Arun-Prakash Rajagopalan	(India) Sriram Balaji (India) Ranjeet Virali-Murugesan	3–6, 4–6
Win	17–15	Aug 2013	Gabon F1, Libreville	Futures	Hard	(India) Jeevan Nedunchezhiyan	(Republic of Ireland) Sam Barry (France) Elie Rousset	6–2, 6–7^{(6–8)}, [10–5]
Loss	17–16	Aug 2013	Gabon F2, Libreville	Futures	Hard	(India) Jeevan Nedunchezhiyan	(Republic of Ireland) Sam Barry (France) Elie Rousset	0–6, 0–6
Loss	17–17	Feb 2014	Kolkata, India	Challenger	Hard	(India) Divij Sharan	(India) Saketh Myneni (India) Sanam Singh	3–6, 6–3, [4–10]
Win	18–17	Mar 2014	India F3, Chennai	Futures	Clay	(India) Jeevan Nedunchezhiyan	(India) Sriram Balaji (India) Ranjeet Virali-Murugesan	7–6^{(7–1)}, 6–3
Loss	18–18	Apr 2014	Uzbekistan F2, Namangan	Futures	Hard	(Poland) Piotr Gadomski	(India) Sriram Balaji (India) Ranjeet Virali-Murugesan	3–6, 1–6
Win	19–18	Jun 2014	Thailand F7, Bangkok	Futures	Hard	(Indonesia) Christopher Rungkat	(Thailand) Timo Sivapruksa (Thailand) Wishaya Trongcharoenchaikul	6–1, 6–2
Loss	19–19	Nov 2014	India F6, Kolkata	Futures	Clay	(India) Vijay Sundar Prashanth	(India) Sriram Balaji (India) Ranjeet Virali-Murugesan	4–6, 2–6
Win	20–19	Nov 2014	India F7, Raipur	Futures	Hard	(India) Jeevan Nedunchezhiyan	(India) Vinayak Sharma Kaza (India) Vijay Sundar Prashanth	2–6, 6–3, [10–6]
Win	21–19	Mar 2015	India F2, Bhimavaram	Futures	Hard	(India) Sriram Balaji	(India) Ramkumar Ramanathan (India) Ranjeet Virali-Murugesan	6–7^{(5–7)}, 6–3, [10–6]
Win	22–19	Jun 2015	India F9, Hyderabad	Futures	Hard (i)	(India) Sriram Balaji	(India) Bhavesh Gour (India) Sidharth Rawat	6–3, 6–0
Win	23–19	Jun 2015	India F10, Hyderabad	Futures	Hard (i)	(India) Sriram Balaji	(France) Antoine Escoffier (France) Hugo Grenier	6–4, 6–2
Win	24–19	Nov 2015	India F16, Gwalior	Futures	Hard	(India) Sriram Balaji	(Chinese Taipei) Hung Jui-chen (India) Ramkumar Ramanathan	6–4, 7–6^{(7–5)}
Win	25–19	Apr 2016	India F1, Chandigarh	Futures	Hard	(India) Sriram Balaji	(Japan) Yuichi Ito (Japan) Sho Katayama	6–1, 6–4
Loss	25–20	Jun 2016	Fergana, Uzbekistan	Challenger	Hard	(Japan) Toshihide Matsui	(France) Yannick Jankovits (Switzerland) Luca Margaroli	4–6, 6–7^{(4–7)}
Win	26–20	Jul 2016	Zimbabwe F2, Harare	Futures	Hard	(France) Hugo Nys	(South Africa) Nicolaas Scholtz (South Africa) Tucker Vorster	6–4, 6–2
Win	27–20	Jul 2016	Zimbabwe F3, Harare	Futures	Hard	(France) Hugo Nys	(Zimbabwe) Benjamin Lock (Zimbabwe) Courtney John Lock	6–7^{(5–7)}, 6–4, [10–5]
Loss	27–21	Aug 2016	Indonesia F1, Jakarta	Futures	Hard	(India) Sriram Balaji	(Chinese Taipei) Huang Liang-chi (China) Wang Aoran	3–6, 6–4, [10–12]
Win	28–21	Sep 2016	India F5, Chennai	Futures	Hard	(India) Sriram Balaji	(India) Kunal Anand (India) Anvit Bendre	6–3, 6–4
Win	29–21	Sep 2016	India F6, Coimbatore	Futures	Hard	(India) Sriram Balaji	(India) Anvit Bendre (India) Vijay Sundar Prashanth	6–3, 6–1
Win	30–21	Feb 2017	India F2, Jorhat	Futures	Hard	(India) Sriram Balaji	(India) Mohit Mayur Jayaprakash (India) Vijay Sundar Prashanth	7–6^{(7–5)}, 4–6, [10–6]
Win	31–21	Mar 2017	India F3, Guwahati	Futures	Hard	(India) Sriram Balaji	(India) Vijay Sundar Prashanth (India) Sanam Singh	6–3, 3–6, [10–6]
Win	32–21	Mar 2017	India F4, Bhilai	Futures	Hard	(India) Sriram Balaji	(United States) Alexander Centenari (Germany) Sami Reinwein	6–2, 6–4
Loss	32–22	Mar 2017	India F5, Bangalore	Futures	Hard	(India) Sriram Balaji	(India) Chandril Sood (India) Lakshit Sood	6–2, 4–6, [6–10]
Win	33–22	Mar 2017	India F6, Trivandrum	Futures	Clay	(India) Sriram Balaji	(Chinese Taipei) Hung Jui-chen (Hong Kong) Wong Hong-kit	6–3, 7–5
Win	34–22	Apr 2017	Uzbekistan F1, Bukhara	Futures	Hard	(India) Sriram Balaji	(Belarus) Sergey Betov (Ukraine) Vladyslav Manafov	6–4, 7–5
Loss	34–23	Apr 2017	Uzbekistan F2, Karshi	Futures	Hard	(India) Sriram Balaji	(Uzbekistan) Sanjar Fayziev (Kazakhstan) Timur Khabibulin	6–7^{(3–7)}, 3–6
Loss	34–24	May 2017	Samarkand, Uzbekistan	Challenger	Hard	(India) Prajnesh Gunneswaran	(Lithuania) Laurynas Grigelis (Czech Republic) Zdeněk Kolář	6–7^{(2–7)}, 3–6
Win	35–24	Jun 2017	Uzbekistan F3, Andijan	Futures	Hard	(India) Sriram Balaji	(Ukraine) Vladyslav Manafov (Russia) Denis Matsukevitch	6–3, 6–2
Win	36–24	Jun 2017	Fergana, Uzbekistan	Challenger	Hard	(India) Sriram Balaji	(Japan) Yuya Kibi (Japan) Shuichi Sekiguchi	6–3, 6–3
Win	37–24	Jul 2017	Astana, Kazakhstan	Challenger	Hard	(Japan) Toshihide Matsui	(Russia) Evgeny Karlovskiy (Russia) Evgenii Tiurnev	7–6^{(7–3)}, 6–7^{(5–7)}, [10–7]
Win	38–24	Aug 2017	Chengdu, China, P.R.	Challenger	Hard	(India) Sriram Balaji	(Chinese Taipei) Hsieh Cheng-peng (Chinese Taipei) Peng Hsien-yin	6–3, 6–4
Loss	38–25	Aug 2017	Jinan, China, P.R.	Challenger	Hard	(India) Sriram Balaji	(Chinese Taipei) Hsieh Cheng-peng (Chinese Taipei) Peng Hsien-yin	6–4, 4–6, [4–10]
Win	39–25	Nov 2017	Shenzhen, China, P.R.	Challenger	Hard	(India) Sriram Balaji	(United States) Austin Krajicek (United States) Jackson Withrow	7–6^{(7–3)}, 7–6^{(7–3)}
Win	40–25	Feb 2018	Chennai, India	Challenger	Hard	(India) Sriram Balaji	(Turkey) Cem İlkel (Serbia) Danilo Petrović	7–6^{(7–5)}, 5–7, [10–5]
Win	41–25	May 2018	Samarkand, Uzbekistan	Challenger	Clay	(India) Sriram Balaji	(Russia) Mikhail Elgin (Uzbekistan) Denis Istomin	w/o
Loss	41–26	Jul 2018	Braunschweig, Germany	Challenger	Clay	(India) Sriram Balaji	(Mexico) Santiago González (Netherlands) Wesley Koolhof	3–6, 3–6
Loss	41–27	May 2019	Busan, Korea, Rep.	Challenger	Hard	(Japan) Toshihide Matsui	(Chinese Taipei) Hsieh Cheng-peng (Indonesia) Christopher Rungkat	6–7^{(7–9)}, 1–6
Loss	41–28	Aug 2019	Meerbusch, Germany	Challenger	Clay	(India) Sriram Balaji	(Germany) Andre Begemann (Romania) Florin Mergea	6–7^{(1–7)}, 7–6^{(7–4)}, [3–10]
Loss	41–29	Nov 2021	M15 Indore, India	World Tennis Tour	Hard	(India) Niki Kaliyanda Poonacha	(India) Anirudh Chandrasekar (India) Nitin Kumar Sinha	4–6, 4–6
Win	42–29	Nov 2021	M15 New Delhi, India	World Tennis Tour	Hard	(India) Saketh Myneni	(United Kingdom) Julian Cash (Hungary) Zsombor Velcz	6–3, 3–6, [11–9]
Loss	42–30	Mar 2022	M15 Bengaluru, India	World Tennis Tour	Hard	(India) Mukund Sasikumar	(United Kingdom) Julian Cash (India) Arjun Kadhe	6–7^{(5–7)}, 6–3, [7–10]
Loss	42–31	Mar 2022	M15 New Delhi, India	World Tennis Tour	Hard	(India) Anirudh Chandrasekar	(India) Yuki Bhambri (India) Saketh Myneni	4–6, 2–6
Loss	42–32	Oct 2022	M15 New Delhi, India	World Tennis Tour	Hard	(India) Nitin Kumar Sinha	(India) Rithvik Choudary Bollipalli (India) Niki Kaliyanda Poonacha	6–7^{(4–7)}, 2–6
Loss	42–33	Nov 2022	M25 Indore, India	World Tennis Tour	Hard	(Serbia) Boris Butulija	(India) Rithvik Choudary Bollipalli (India) Niki Kaliyanda Poonacha	6–7^{(4–7)}, 3–6
Loss	42–34	Nov 2022	M25 Mumbai, India	World Tennis Tour	Hard	(Ukraine) Vladyslav Orlov	(India) Rithvik Choudary Bollipalli (India) Niki Kaliyanda Poonacha	2–6, 2–6
Win	43–34	Mar 2023	M25 Mysuru, India	World Tennis Tour	Hard	(India) Mukund Sasikumar	(India) Rithvik Choudary Bollipalli (India) Niki Kaliyanda Poonacha	6–3, 6–4
Win	44–34	Apr 2023	M15 Chennai, India	World Tennis Tour	Hard	(India) Nitin Kumar Sinha	(India) Sai Karteek Reddy Ganta (India) Theertha Shashank Macherla	6–1, 6–7^{(2–7)}, [10–7]
Win	45–34	Oct 2023	M15 Davangere, India	World Tennis Tour	Hard	(India) Siddhant Banthia	(India) Sai Karteek Reddy Ganta (India) Manish Sureshkumar	6–2, 7–5
Win	46–34	Mar 2024	M25 New Delhi, India	World Tennis Tour	Hard	(India) Siddhant Banthia	(India) Parikshit Somani (India) Manish Sureshkumar	6–4, 6–1
Win	47–34	Jul 2024	M15 Nakhon Si Thammarat, Thailand	World Tennis Tour	Hard	(India) Adil Kalyanpur	(Philippines) Francis Casey Alcantara (Thailand) Maximus Jones	6–3, 6–2
Loss	47–35	Jul 2024	M15 Nakhon Si Thammarat, Thailand	World Tennis Tour	Hard	(India) Adil Kalyanpur	(Philippines) Francis Casey Alcantara (Thailand) Maximus Jones	6–2, 5–7, [8–10]

== See also ==
- Tennis at the 2010 Asian Games
