= Bangkok Challenger =

- 2019 Bangkok Challenger

Defunct tennis tournament
- Location: Bangkok, Thailand
- Venue: Rama Gardens Hotel
- Category: ATP Challenger Tour
- Surface: Hard / Outdoors
- Draw: 32S/32Q/16D
- Prize money: €50,000+H

The Bangkok Challenger (formerly known as SAT Bangkok Open, Chang-Sat Bangkok Open and KPN Bangkok Open) was a tennis tournament held in Bangkok, Thailand from 2009 until 2020. The event was part of the ATP Challenger Tour and was played on outdoor hardcourts.

== Past finals ==
=== Singles ===
Year	Champion	Runner-up	Score
2009	(Germany) Florian Mayer	(Thailand) Danai Udomchoke	7–5, 6–2
2010	(Bulgaria) Grigor Dimitrov	(Russia) Konstantin Kravchuk	6–1, 6–4
2011	(Germany) Cedrik-Marcel Stebe	(Israel) Amir Weintraub	7–5, 6–1
2012	(Israel) Dudi Sela	(Japan) Yuichi Sugita	6–1, 7–5
2013	(Slovenia) Blaž Kavčič	(South Korea) Jeong Suk-young	6–3, 6–1
2014	(South Korea) Hyeon Chung	(Australia) Jordan Thompson	7–6^{(7–0)}, 6–4
2015	(Japan) Yūichi Sugita	(Argentina) Marco Trungelliti	6–4, 6–2
2016	(Russia) Mikhail Youzhny	(Japan) Go Soeda	6–3, 6–4
2017	(Serbia) Janko Tipsarević	(Slovenia) Blaž Kavčič	6–3, 7–6^{(7–1)}
2018	(Spain) Marcel Granollers	(Germany) Mats Moraing	4–6, 6–3, 7–5
2019	(Switzerland) Henri Laaksonen	(Israel) Dudi Sela	6–2, 6–4
2020	(Hungary) Attila Balázs	(Russia) Aslan Karatsev	7–6^{(7–5)}, 0–6, 7–6^{(8–6)}

=== Doubles ===
Year	Champions	Runners-up	Score
2009	(United Kingdom) Joshua Goodall (Australia) Joseph Sirianni	(Russia) Michail Elgin (Russia) Alexandre Kudryavtsev	6–3, 6–1
2010	(China) Gong Maoxin (China) Li Zhe	(India) Yuki Bhambri (United States) Ryler DeHeart	6–3, 6–4
2011	(Canada) Pierre-Ludovic Duclos (Italy) Riccardo Ghedin	(United States) Nicholas Monroe (France) Ludovic Walter	6–4, 6–4
2012	(India) Divij Sharan (India) Vishnu Vardhan	(Chinese Taipei) Lee Hsin-han (Chinese Taipei) Peng Hsien-yin	6–3, 6–4
2013	(Chinese Taipei) Chen Ti (Chinese Taipei) Huang Liang-Chi	(South Korea) Jeong Suk-young (South Korea) Nam Ji-sung	6–3, 6–2
2014	(Thailand) Pruchya Isaro (Thailand) Nuttanon Kadchapanan	(Chinese Taipei) Chen Ti (Chinese Taipei) Peng Hsien-yin	6–4, 6–4
2015	(China) Bai Yan (Italy) Riccardo Ghedin	(Chinese Taipei) Chen Ti (China) Li Zhe	6–2, 7–5
2016	(Sweden) Johan Brunström (Sweden) Andreas Siljeström	(Germany) Gero Kretschmer (Germany) Alexander Satschko	6–3, 6–4
2017	(France) Grégoire Barrère (France) Jonathan Eysseric	(Japan) Yūichi Sugita (China) Wu Di	6–3, 6–2
2018	(Spain) Gerard Granollers (Spain) Marcel Granollers	(Czech Republic) Zdeněk Kolář (Portugal) Gonçalo Oliveira	6–3, 7–6^{(8–6)}
2019	(China) Gong Maoxin (China) Zhang Ze	(Chinese Taipei) Hsieh Cheng-peng (Indonesia) Christopher Rungkat	6–4, 6–4
2020	(Kazakhstan) Andrey Golubev (Kazakhstan) Aleksandr Nedovyesov	(Thailand) Sanchai Ratiwatana (Indonesia) Christopher Rungkat	3–6, 7–6^{(7–1)}, [10–5]
