= Peng Hsien-yin =

Taiwanese tennis player (born 1989)

Peng Hsien-yin 彭賢尹
- Country (sports): Chinese Taipei
- Residence: Taiwan
- Born: 22 December 1989 (age 36) Taiwan
- Height: 1.80 m (5 ft 11 in)
- Turned pro: 2006
- Retired: 2018 (last match played)
- Plays: Right-handed
- Prize money: US $141,021

Singles
- Career record: 0–2 (ATP Tour and Grand Slam main draws, and in Davis Cup)
- Career titles: 0
- Highest ranking: No. 956 (9 July 2012)

Doubles
- Career record: 4–11 (ATP Tour and Grand Slam main draws, and in Davis Cup)
- Career titles: 0
- Highest ranking: No. 96 (7 May 2018)

Grand Slam doubles results
- Wimbledon: 1R (2017)

Peng Hsien-yin
Medal record

Representing Chinese Taipei

Men's Tennis

Asian Games
Silver medal – second place	2014 Incheon	Mixed doubles

Summer Universiade
Gold medal – first place	2017 Taipei	Men's team
Silver medal – second place	2015 Gwangju	Men's team
Bronze medal – third place	2015 Gwangju	Men's doubles
Bronze medal – third place	2015 Gwangju	Mixed doubles
Gold medal – first place	2013 Kazan	Men's doubles
Silver medal – second place	2013 Kazan	Men's team

Peng Hsien-yin
- Traditional Chinese: 彭賢尹
- Simplified Chinese: 彭贤尹
Transcriptions
Standard Mandarin
- Hanyu Pinyin: Péng Xiányǐn

Peng Hsien-yin (Chinese: 彭賢尹; born 22 December 1989) is a Taiwanese former professional tennis player and competes mainly on the ATP Challenger Tour and ITF Futures, both in singles and doubles. He has a career-high ATP singles ranking of world No. 956 achieved on 9 July 2012 and a best doubles ranking of No. 96, reached on 7 May 2018.

Career to date, Peng has reacher 45 doubles finals all on the ATP Challenger and ITF Futures tours. Of those he has a final record of 21 wins and 24 losses.

He competes for his native country of Taiwan in Davis Cup play. In singles matches, he has a record of 0 wins and 2 losses. In doubles matches, he has a record of 3 wins and 5 losses.

In 2017 at the 2017 Wimbledon Championships partnering Sander Arends of the Netherlands, Peng won his first-round qualifying match and even though he lost in the second and final qualifying round, was granted a lucky loser spot to successfully reach his first (and to date, his only) career Grand Slam main draw in men's doubles. In a rare twist of fate, their first round opponents were the same ones they lost to in qualifying, Swedish duo Johan Brunström and Andreas Siljeström. This time the match was a back-and-forth tight five set thriller that span several hours, and ended with a 22-game 5th set. They were unfortunately on the losing end of a 7–6^{(7–4)}, 1–6, 6–4, 6–7^{(4–7)}, 10–12 score sheet.

In 2018, Peng attempted to qualify again the following year at the 2018 Wimbledon Championships partnering Aliaksandr Bury of Belarus, however they were defeated in the first round by Ariel Behar and Hsieh Cheng-peng 3–6, 6–4, 4–6.

Other than the 3 wins he has amounted from Davis Cup matches, the only other win Peng has achieved at the ATP Tour level was at the 2015 Open Sud de France held on hard courts in Montpellier. Partnering Mao-Xin Gong of China, they defeated the pairing of Alexander Zverev and Laurent Lokoli 6–4, 7–6^{(7–4)} in the first round before losing in the second round quite handily to doubles specialists Rameez Junaid and Adil Shamasdin 1–6, 1–6.

== ATP Challenger & ITF Futures finals ==
=== Doubles: 45 (21–24) ===
Legend (doubles) ATP Challenger Tour (14–13) ITF Futures Tour (7–11)	Titles by surface Hard (19–20) Clay (2–4) Grass (0–0) Carpet (0–0)

Result	W–L	Date	Tournament	Tier	Surface	Partner	Opponents	Score
Loss	0–1	Aug 2006	Indonesia F3, Manado	Futures	Hard	(Chinese Taipei) Lee Hsin-han	(Indonesia) Bonit Wiryawan (Indonesia) Elbert Se	6–4, 3–6, 4–6
Loss	0–2	Aug 2007	Indonesia F2, Semarang	Futures	Hard	(Chinese Taipei) Yang Tsung-hua	(Japan) Hiroki Kondo (Japan) Takahiro Terachi	6–3, 6–7^{(5–7)}, 3–6
Win	1–2	Aug 2007	Indonesia F3, Jakarta	Futures	Hard	(Chinese Taipei) Chang Huai-En	(Indonesia) Christopher Rungkat (Indonesia) Bonit Wiryawan	7–5, 6–3
Loss	1–3	Sep 2007	Indonesia F4, Manado	Futures	Hard	(Chinese Taipei) Chang Huai-En	(United States) Brad Lum-Tucker (United States) Ikaika Jobe	3–6, 2–6
Loss	1–4	Feb 2008	India F1, Kolkata	Futures	Clay	(Chinese Taipei) Chang Huai-En	(India) Vijay Kannan (Kazakhstan) Alexey Kedryuk	6–7^{(7–9)}, 6–7^{(2–7)}
Loss	1–5	Aug 2008	Indonesia F1, Jakarta	Futures	Hard	(Chinese Taipei) Yi Chu-Huan	(Indonesia) Christopher Rungkat (Indonesia) Ayrton Wibowo	1–6, 5–7
Loss	1–6	Oct 2008	Japan F10, Kashiwa	Futures	Hard	(Chinese Taipei) Huang Chin-yu	(Chinese Taipei) Yi Chu-Huan (Chinese Taipei) Yang Tsung-hua	1–6, 2–6
Loss	1–7	Jan 2012	China F1, Shenzhen	Futures	Hard	(Chinese Taipei) Lee Hsin-han	(France) Pierre-Hugues Herbert (Slovakia) Ivo Klec	4–6, 2–6
Win	2–7	Apr 2012	Japan F3, Kofu	Futures	Hard	(Japan) Bumpei Sato	(China) Yu Chang (China) Xin Gao	6–3, 5–7, [10–6]
Win	3–7	Apr 2012	Japan F4, Tsukuba	Futures	Hard	(Chinese Taipei) Huang Liang-chi	(Japan) Shota Tagawa (Japan) Yasutaka Uchiyama	6–3, 6–4
Win	4–7	May 2012	Thailand F3, Bangkok	Futures	Hard	(Chinese Taipei) Lee Hsin-han	(Indonesia) Christopher Rungkat (Indonesia) David Agung Susanto	7–6^{(7–3)}, 6–3
Win	5–7	Aug 2012	Qarshi, Uzbekistan	Challenger	Hard	(Chinese Taipei) Lee Hsin-han	(Australia) Brydan Klein (Japan) Yasutaka Uchiyama	6–7^{(5–7)}, 6–4, [10–4]
Loss	5–8	Sep 2012	Bangkok, Thailand	Challenger	Hard	(Chinese Taipei) Lee Hsin-han	(India) Divij Sharan (India) Vishnu Vardhan	3–6, 4–6
Win	6–8	Oct 2012	Seoul, South Korea	Challenger	Hard	(Chinese Taipei) Lee Hsin-han	(South Korea) Lim Yong-Kyu (South Korea) Nam Ji-Sung	7–6^{(7–3)}, 7–5
Win	7–8	Jan 2013	Honolulu, United States	Challenger	Hard	(Chinese Taipei) Lee Hsin-han	(United States) Tennys Sandgren (United States) Rhyne Williams	6–7^{(1–7)}, 6–2, [10–5]
Win	8–8	May 2013	Busan, South Korea	Challenger	Hard	(Chinese Taipei) Yang Tsung-hua	(South Korea) Suk-Young Jeong (South Korea) Lim Yong-Kyu	6–4, 6–3
Win	9–8	Jun 2013	Prague, Czech Republic	Challenger	Clay	(Chinese Taipei) Lee Hsin-han	(United States) Vahid Mirzadeh (United States) Denis Zivkovic	6–4, 4–6, [10–5]
Loss	9–9	Jun 2013	Milan, Italy	Challenger	Clay	(Australia) Alex Bolt	(Italy) Marco Crugnola (Italy) Daniele Giorgini	6–4, 5–7, [8–10]
Loss	9–10	Sep 2013	Shanghai, China	Challenger	Hard	(Chinese Taipei) Lee Hsin-han	(Thailand) Sanchai Ratiwatana (Thailand) Sonchat Ratiwatana	4–6, 3–6
Loss	9–11	Nov 2013	Seoul, South Korea	Challenger	Hard	(Chinese Taipei) Lee Hsin-han	(Croatia) Marin Draganja (Croatia) Mate Pavić	5–7, 2–6
Loss	9–12	Nov 2013	Yeongwol, South Korea	Challenger	Hard	(Chinese Taipei) Lee Hsin-han	(Croatia) Marin Draganja (Croatia) Mate Pavić	4–6, 6–4, [7–10]
Loss	9–13	May 2014	Qarshi, Uzbekistan	Challenger	Hard	(China) Mao-Xin Gong	(Belarus) Sergey Betov (Belarus) Aliaksandr Bury	5–7, 6–1, [6–10]
Loss	9–14	Jun 2014	China F6, Putian	Futures	Hard	(Chinese Taipei) Yang Tsung-hua	(China) Zhe Li (China) Mao-Xin Gong	1–6, 3–6
Win	10–14	Jun 2014	China F7, Putian	Futures	Hard	(Chinese Taipei) Yang Tsung-hua	(Chinese Taipei) Huang Liang-chi (United States) Nicolas Meister	1–6, 6–1, [15–13]
Win	11–14	Jun 2014	Nan Chang, China	Challenger	Hard	(Chinese Taipei) Chen Ti	(Australia) Jordan Kerr (France) Fabrice Martin	6–2, 3–6, [12–10]
Win	12–14	Jul 2014	Kaohsiung, Taiwan	Challenger	Hard	(China) Mao-Xin Gong	(Chinese Taipei) Chen Ti (Chinese Taipei) Huang Liang-chi	6–3, 6–2
Loss	12–15	Aug 2014	Meerbusch, Germany	Challenger	Clay	(China) Mao-Xin Gong	(Germany) Matthias Bachinger (Germany) Dominik Meffert	3–6, 6–3, [6–10]
Loss	12–16	Aug 2014	Bangkok, Thailand	Challenger	Hard	(Chinese Taipei) Chen Ti	(Thailand) Pruchya Isaro (Thailand) Nuttanon Kadchapanan	4–6, 4–6
Win	13–16	May 2015	Seoul, South Korea	Challenger	Hard	(China) Mao-Xin Gong	(South Korea) Hyung-Taik Lee (Thailand) Danai Udomchoke	6–4, 7–5
Loss	13–17	Sep 2015	Kaohsiung, Taiwan	Challenger	Hard	(China) Mao-Xin Gong	(Chinese Taipei) Yang Tsung-hua (Chinese Taipei) Hsieh Cheng-peng	2–6, 2–6
Loss	13–18	Nov 2015	Suzhou, China	Challenger	Hard	(China) Mao-Xin Gong	(Chinese Taipei) Lee Hsin-han (Ukraine) Denys Molchanov	6–3, 6–7^{(5–7)}, [4–10]
Win	14–18	Apr 2016	China F4, Zhangjiagang	Futures	Hard	(Chinese Taipei) Hsieh Cheng-peng	(India) N.Sriram Balaji (Japan) Shuichi Sekiguchi	7–6^{(7–4)}, 6–3
Loss	14–19	May 2016	China F8, Lu'an	Futures	Hard	(China) Chuhan Wang	(China) Bowen Ouwang (China) Xin Gao	5–7, 3–6
Win	15–19	Jun 2016	China F9, Jinan	Futures	Hard	(China) Mao-Xin Gong	(United States) Mitchell Krueger (United States) Connor Smith	7–6^{(7–2)}, 6–4
Loss	15–20	Jun 2016	Milan, Italy	Challenger	Clay	(Italy) Alessandro Motti	(Mexico) M-A Reyes-Varela (United States) Max Schnur	6–1, 6–7^{(4–7)}, [5–10]
Win	16–20	Jul 2016	Poznań, Poland	Challenger	Clay	(Georgia (country)) Aleksandre Metreveli	(Poland) Mateusz Kowalczyk (Poland) Kamil Majchrzak	6–4, 3–6, [10–8]
Win	17–20	Mar 2017	Quanzhou, China	Challenger	Hard	(Chinese Taipei) Hsieh Cheng-peng	(Germany) Andre Begemann (Belarus) Aliaksandr Bury	3–6, 6–4, [10–7]
Loss	17–21	Apr 2017	China F4, Luzhou	Futures	Hard	(Chinese Taipei) Jimmy Wang	(China) Zhe Li (China) Xin Gao	6–4, 3–6, [6–10]
Loss	17–22	Apr 2017	China F5, Luzhou	Futures	Hard	(China) Zihao Xia	(China) Yecong He (China) Zhizhen Zhang	6–7^{(5–7)}, 3-6
Win	18–22	May 2017	Seoul, South Korea	Challenger	Hard	(Chinese Taipei) Hsieh Cheng-peng	(Italy) Thomas Fabbiano (Israel) Dudi Sela	5–1 ret.
Win	19–22	May 2017	Busan, South Korea	Challenger	Hard	(Chinese Taipei) Hsieh Cheng-peng	(Thailand) Sonchat Ratiwatana (Thailand) Sanchai Ratiwatana	7–5, 4–6, [10–8]
Loss	19–23	Aug 2017	Chengdu, China	Challenger	Hard	(Chinese Taipei) Hsieh Cheng-peng	(India) N. Sriram Balaji (India) Vishnu Vardhan	3–6, 4–6
Win	20–23	Aug 2017	Jinan, China	Challenger	Hard	(Chinese Taipei) Hsieh Cheng-peng	(India) N. Sriram Balaji (India) Vishnu Vardhan	4–6, 6–4, [10–4]
Loss	20–24	Mar 2018	Zhuhai, China	Challenger	Hard	(Belarus) Aliaksandr Bury	(Ukraine) Denys Molchanov (Slovakia) Igor Zelenay	5–7, 6–7^{(4–7)}
Win	21–24	Mar 2018	Qujing, China	Challenger	Hard	(Belarus) Aliaksandr Bury	(China) Di Wu (China) Ze Zhang	6–7^{(3–7)}, 6–4, [12–10]
