= Ludovic Walter =

French tennis player

- Country (sports): France
- Born: 4 January 1983 (age 42)
- Height: 6 ft 3 in (191 cm)
- Prize money: $92,013

Singles
- Career record: 0–1 (ATP Tour)
- Career titles: 0 Challenger, 3 Futures
- Highest ranking: No. 279 (30 January 2012)

Grand Slam singles results
- Australian Open: Q1 (2012)
- US Open: Q1 (2011)

Doubles
- Career titles: 0 Challenger, 7 Futures
- Highest ranking: No. 335 (29 September 2008)
- Last updated on: 23 April 2021.

Ludovic Walter (born 4 January 1983) is a French former professional tennis player.

Walter, who comes from the town of Vannes in Brittany, spent his early career in the United States playing varsity tennis for Duke University, where he was a three-time All-American (2004, 2005 and 2006).

From 2006 to 2012 he competed on the professional tour and reached his career high singles ranking of 279 on his final month on tour. He featured in one ATP Tour main draw, as the qualifier at the 2011 UNICEF Open in Rosmalen.

Walter now works in finance and is based in London.

== ATP Challenger and ITF Futures finals ==
=== Singles: 10 (3–7) ===
Legend ATP Challenger (0–0) ITF Futures (3–7)	Finals by surface Hard (2–5) Clay (0–0) Grass (0–0) Carpet (1–2)

Result	W–L	Date	Tournament	Tier	Surface	Opponent	Score
Loss	0–1	Mar 2007	Canada F3, Rock-Forest	Futures	Hard	(Canada) Frédéric Niemeyer	6–4, 3–6, 6–7^{(0–7)}
Loss	0–2	Jun 2007	Turkey F6, Istanbul	Futures	Hard	(Israel) Dekel Valtzer	3–6, 6–7^{(4–7)}
Loss	0–3	Jan 2008	Austria F2, Salzburg	Futures	Carpet	(Germany) Peter Gojowczyk	6–4, 6–7^{(4–7)}, 0–6
Loss	0–4	Sep 2008	Spain F35, Madrid	Futures	Hard	(Bulgaria) Grigor Dimitrov	4–6, 4–6
Loss	0–5	Oct 2009	Spain F16, Sarreguemines	Futures	Carpet	(Netherlands) Michel Koning	6–7^{(5–7)}, 3–6
Win	1–5	Jun 2010	Spain F20, Tenerife	Futures	Carpet	(Switzerland) Michael Lammer	4–6, 6–3, 7–6^{(7–4)}
Loss	1–6	Sep 2010	France F13, Bagnères-de-Bigorre	Futures	Hard	(France) Grégoire Burquier	3–6, 6–7^{(4–7)}
Loss	1–7	Sep 2010	France F15, Plaisir	Futures	Hard	(France) Clement Reix	6–2, 6–7^{(8–10)}, 2–6
Win	2–7	Dec 2011	Turkey F33, Antalya	Futures	Hard	(Bosnia and Herzegovina) Aldin Šetkić	6–2, 6–4
Win	3–7	Dec 2011	Turkey F34, Antalya	Futures	Hard	(Netherlands) Boy Westerhof	6–4, 6–4

=== Doubles: 18 (7–11) ===
Legend ATP Challenger (0–1) ITF Futures (7–10)	Finals by surface Hard (4–10) Clay (1–1) Grass (0–0) Carpet (2–0)

Result	W–L	Date	Tournament	Tier	Surface	Partner	Opponents	Score
Loss	0–1	Oct 2006	Mexico F16, Ciudad Obregón	Futures	Hard	(United States) Stephen Amritraj	(Australia) Raphael Durek (Mexico) Carlos Palencia	7–5, 3–6, 4–6
Win	1–1	Sep 2007	Spain F34, Móstoles	Futures	Hard	(France) Jeremy Blandin	(Spain) A. Alonso-Campos (Spain) C. Rexach-Itoiz	6–3, 7–5
Win	2–1	Feb 2008	France F2, Feucherolles	Futures	Hard	(France) Thomas Oger	(France) Romain Jouan (France) Mathieu Rodrigues	6–3, 6–4
Loss	2–2	Feb 2008	Italy F2, Trento	Futures	Hard	(France) Xavier Audouy	(Italy) Paolo Lorenzi (Italy) Giancarlo Petrazzuolo	3–6, 6–4, [8–10]
Loss	2–3	Mar 2008	France F4, Lille	Futures	Hard	(France) Xavier Audouy	(France) Thomas Oger (France) Nicolas Tourte	2–6, 5–7
Win	3–3	May 2008	Great Britain F7, Bournemouth	Futures	Clay	(United Kingdom) Ken Skupski	(United Kingdom) Edward Seator (United Kingdom) Daniel Smethurst	7–6^{(7–2)}, 2–6, [10–6]
Win	4–3	Jun 2008	Ireland F1, Dublin	Futures	Carpet	(United States) Brad Pomeroy	(India) Harsh Mankad (India) Ashutosh Singh	7–6^{(7–4)}, 6–4
Win	5–3	Jul 2008	Turkey F8, Istanbul	Futures	Hard	(Republic of Ireland) Valentin Sanon	(France) Simon Cauvard (France) Clement Reix	4–6, 7–6^{(7–5)}, [10–8]
Win	6–3	Sep 2008	Spain F34, Madrid	Futures	Hard	(Spain) D. Canudas-Fernandez	(Spain) J, Checa Calvo (Greece) Alexandros Jakupovic	7–6^{(8–6)}, 6–4
Loss	6–4	Sep 2008	Spain F35, Madrid	Futures	Hard	(Spain) D. Canudas-Fernandez	(Spain) J. Checa Calvo (Greece) Alexandros Jakupovic	6–2, 3–6, [8–10]
Loss	6–5	May 2009	Slovenia F1, Domžale	Futures	Clay	(France) C-A Brezac	(Germany) Nils Langer (Argentina) A. Dominguez	1–6, 1–6
Loss	6–6	Aug 2009	Israel F4 Ramat HaSharon	Futures	Hard	(Israel) Amir Weintraub	(United States) John Paul Fruttero (New Zealand) G.D. Jones	2–6, 6–4, [5–10]
Loss	6–7	Sep 2009	Spain F31 Móstoles	Futures	Hard	(France) Jeremy Blandin	(Spain) D. Canudas-Fernandez (Togo) Komlavi Loglo	6–7^{(5–7)}, 6–7^{(2–7)}
Win	7–7	Jan 2010	Germany F3, Kaarst	Futures	Carpet	(Luxembourg) Mike Scheidweiler	(Montenegro) Daniel Danilović (Czech Republic) Pavel Šnobel	7–6^{(12–10)}, 6–7^{(6–8)}, [10–4]
Loss	7–8	Mar 2010	Great Britain F3, Tipton	Futures	Hard	(France) Olivier Charroin	(Slovakia) Kamil Čapkovič (Slovakia) Andrej Martin	0–6, 2–6
Loss	7–9	Apr 2010	Korea F1, Seogwipo	Futures	Hard	(France) Gary Lugassy	(South Korea) An Jae-Sung (South Korea) Lee Chul-Hee	6–7^{(7–9)}, 5–7
Loss	7–10	Jun 2010	Spain F19, Lanzarote	Futures	Hard	(Switzerland) Michael Lammer	(Portugal) João Sousa (Spain) G. Rumenov Payakov	6–7^{(4–7)}, 0–6
Loss	7–11	Sep 2011	Bangkok, Thailand	Challenger	Hard	(United States) Nicholas Monroe	(Canada) Pierre-Ludovic Duclos (Italy) Riccardo Ghedin	4–6, 4–6
