= Jeong Suk-young =

South Korean tennis player

Jeong Suk-young 정석영
- Country (sports): South Korea
- Born: 12 April 1993 (age 32) Busan, South Korea
- Retired: 2016 (last match played)
- Plays: Right-handed (two-handed backhand)
- Prize money: $55,015

Singles
- Career record: 4–5 (at ATP Tour level, Grand Slam level, and in Davis Cup)
- Career titles: 0; 0 Challenger, 1 Futures
- Highest ranking: No. 270 (9 September 2013)

Doubles
- Career record: 0–1 (at ATP Tour level, Grand Slam level, and in Davis Cup)
- Career titles: 0; 0 Challenger, 0 Futures
- Highest ranking: No. 466 (16 September 2013)
- Last updated on: 31 December 2024.

- Jeong Suk-young
- Hangul: 정석영
- RR: Jeong Seokyeong
- MR: Chŏng Sŏgyŏng

Jeong Suk-young (Korean: 정석영; born 12 April 1993) is a South Korean former professional tennis player.

Jeong has a career high ATP singles ranking of 270 achieved on 9 September 2013. He also has a career high ATP doubles ranking of 466 achieved on 16 September 2013.

Jeong made his ATP main draw debut at the 2013 PTT Thailand Open in the singles draw facing Denis Istomin. Jeong also represents South Korea at the Davis Cup, where he has a W/L record of 4–5.

== ATP Challenger and ITF Futures finals ==
=== Singles: 6 (1–5) ===
Legend ATP Challenger (0–2) ITF Futures (1–3)	Finals by surface Hard (1–5) Clay (0–0) Grass (0–0) Carpet (0–0)

Result	W–L	Date	Tournament	Tier	Surface	Opponent	Score
Loss	0–1	Aug 2010	Thailand F3, Nakhon Ratchasima	Futures	Hard	(Germany) Sebastian Rieschick	1–6, 1–6
Win	1–1	Jul 2012	India F10, Coimbatore	Futures	Hard	(India) Vijay Sundar Prashanth	6–2, 7–5
Loss	1–2	Jul 2012	India F11, Chennai	Futures	Hard	(India) Saketh Myneni	3–6, 6–2, 4–6
Loss	1–3	Sep 2012	Ningbo, China	Challenger	Hard	(Germany) Peter Gojowczyk	3–6, 1–6
Loss	1–4	Dec 2012	Indonesia F3, Jakarta	Futures	Hard	(Indonesia) Christopher Rungkat	4–6, 5–7
Loss	1–5	Sep 2013	Bangkok, Thailand	Challenger	Hard	(Slovenia) Blaz Kavcic	3–6, 1–6

=== Doubles: 4 (0–4) ===
Legend ATP Challenger (0–2) ITF Futures (0–2)	Finals by surface Hard (0–4) Clay (0–0) Grass (0–0) Carpet (0–0)

Result	W–L	Date	Tournament	Tier	Surface	Partner	Opponents	Score
Loss	0–1	Jul 2011	Chinese Taipei F2, Taipei	Futures	Hard	(Chinese Taipei) Huang Liang-Chi	(Chinese Taipei) Hsieh Cheng-peng (Chinese Taipei) Lee Hsin-Han	6–1, 3–6, [5–10]
Loss	0–2	May 2012	Korea F1, Daegu	Futures	Hard	(South Korea) Hong Chung	(Australia) Sam Groth (Australia) Adam Hubble	1–6, 4–6
Loss	0–3	May 2013	Busan, South Korea	Challenger	Hard	(South Korea) Lim Yong-kyu	(Chinese Taipei) Peng Hsien-yin (Chinese Taipei) Yang Tsung-hua	4–6, 3–6
Loss	0–4	Sep 2013	Bangkok, Thailand	Challenger	Hard	(South Korea) Nam Ji-sung	(Chinese Taipei) Ti Chen (Chinese Taipei) Huang Liang-Chi	3–6, 2–6
