= Amir Weintraub =

Israeli tennis player (born 1986)

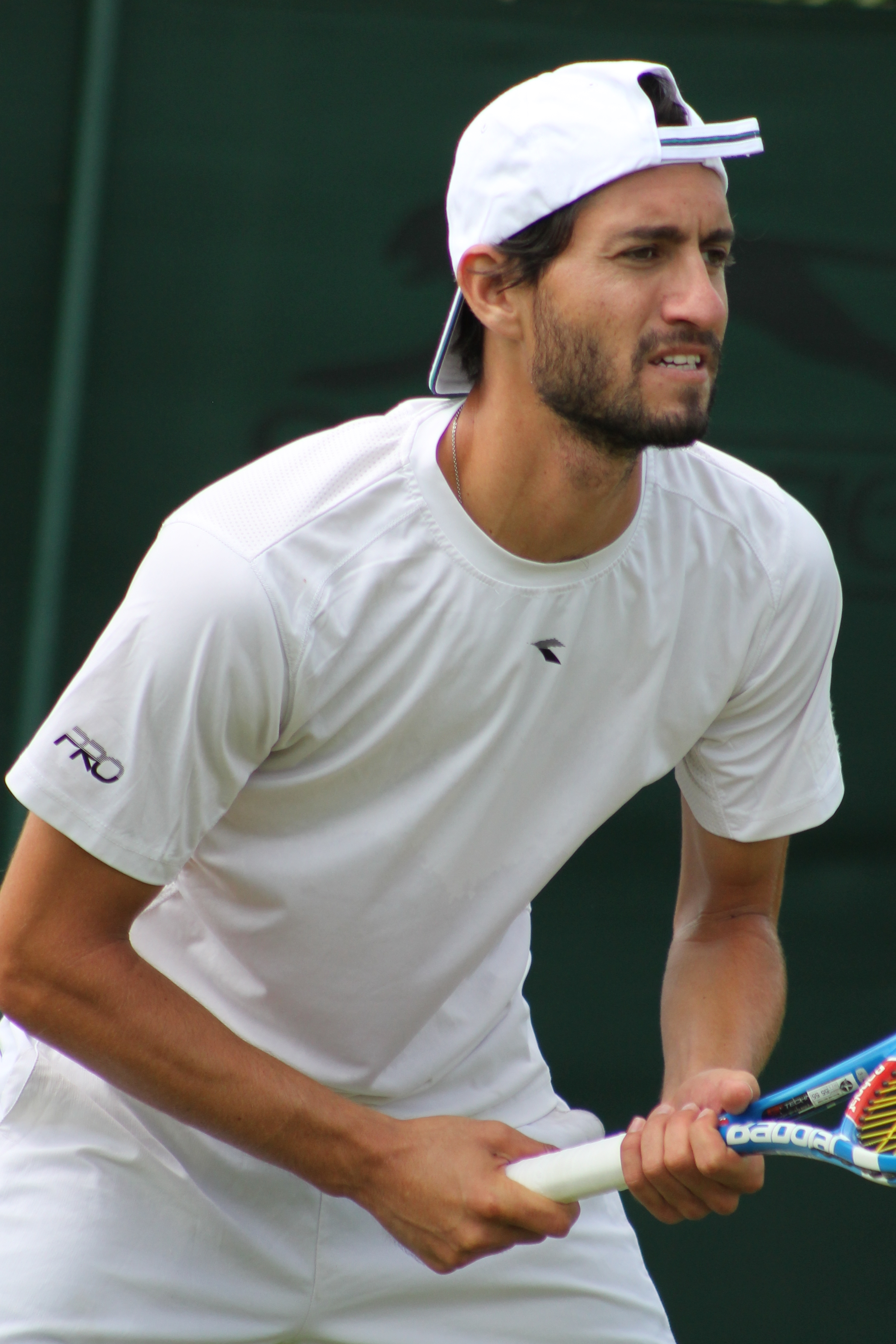
- Weintraub at the 2015 Wimbledon Championships
- Native name: אמיר ויינטרוב
- Country (sports): Israel
- Born: 16 September 1986 (age 39) Rehovot, Israel
- Height: 1.88 m (6 ft 2 in)
- Turned pro: 2005
- Plays: Right-handed (one-handed backhand)
- Prize money: US$ 447,978

Singles
- Career record: 11–11
- Career titles: 0
- Highest ranking: No. 161 (21 May 2012)

Grand Slam singles results
- Australian Open: 2R (2013)
- French Open: Q2 (2013)
- Wimbledon: Q2 (2013)
- US Open: Q3 (2013)

Doubles
- Career record: 0–0
- Career titles: 0
- Highest ranking: No. 246 (25 February 2013)
- Last updated on: 28 December 2017.

Amir Weintraub (Hebrew: אמיר ויינטרוב; born 16 September 1986) is an Israeli professional tennis player. In 2010, he won the Israeli Tennis Championship.

He achieved a career-high singles ranking of World No. 161 in May 2012.

== Career overview ==
In August 2006 at the age of 19, Weintraub won his first ITF Futures title in Senegal. One year later, he made his first challenger final in Uzbekistan but lost to Denis Istomin.

In December 2009, Weintraub made it to the finals of the Israeli Tennis Championship, losing to Dudi Sela in three sets. In December 2010, he won the Israeli Tennis Championship, winning against Sela 7–6, 3–6, 7–6.

In January 2011 Weintraub participated for the first time in a Grand Slam tournament, the Australian Open, but lost in the first qualifying round. In the same month, it was decided that he would play in the Israeli Davis Cup team as the second singles player in their tie against Poland.

In March 2011 Weintraub won his first Davis Cup match, against Poland's Jerzy Janowicz in 5 sets. On 16 September 2011, he defeated Milos Raonic in four sets to square Israel's Davis Cup tie with Canada at 1–1 but then he lost the decisive tie to Vasek Pospisil, on 18 September.

Weintraub made the finals of the 2012 Fergana Challenger which would push him to his career-high ranking of 161 on May 21, 2012.

In September 2012, Weintraub participated in a Davis Cup tie against the Japan Davis Cup team and won his first match against Tatsuma Ito in straight sets, and won the decisive match against Go Soeda who ranked 170 places above him in four sets. Because of this match Israel qualified for the 2013 Davis Cup World Group after a two-year absence.

Weintraub qualified for singles main draw play at the 2013 Australian Open where he defeated Guido Pella in the first round and lost in the second round to 17th seed Philipp Kohlschreiber.

Weintraub sustained a severe groin injury at the 2014 Davis Cup and was inactive for nine months after he failed to qualify for 2014 Wimbledon. His ranking dropped to a low of 623 in June 2015.

2016 saw a return to form for Weintraub as he surged back into the top 200 in March. He won two more ITF titles within the year.

Weintraub suffered another injury at the beginning of 2017 and was inactive for the rest of 2017, all of 2018, and the first few months of 2019. He dropped out of the ATP rankings in January 2018.

Weintraub returned to tennis by using a protected ranking at the 2019 French Open Qualifying where he lost to 19th seed Lukáš Rosol in the first round. Throughout 2019 he would continuously receive protected ranking spots into the qualifying draws of ATP tournaments which also included a main draw appearance at the 2019 Winston-Salem Open where he was doubles bageled in the first round by qualifier Bjorn Fratangelo.

Weintraub played his last match to date at the 2020 Australian Open qualifying where he lost to Lorenzo Musetti in the first round. He has not played a match since.

== ITF & Challenger career finals ==
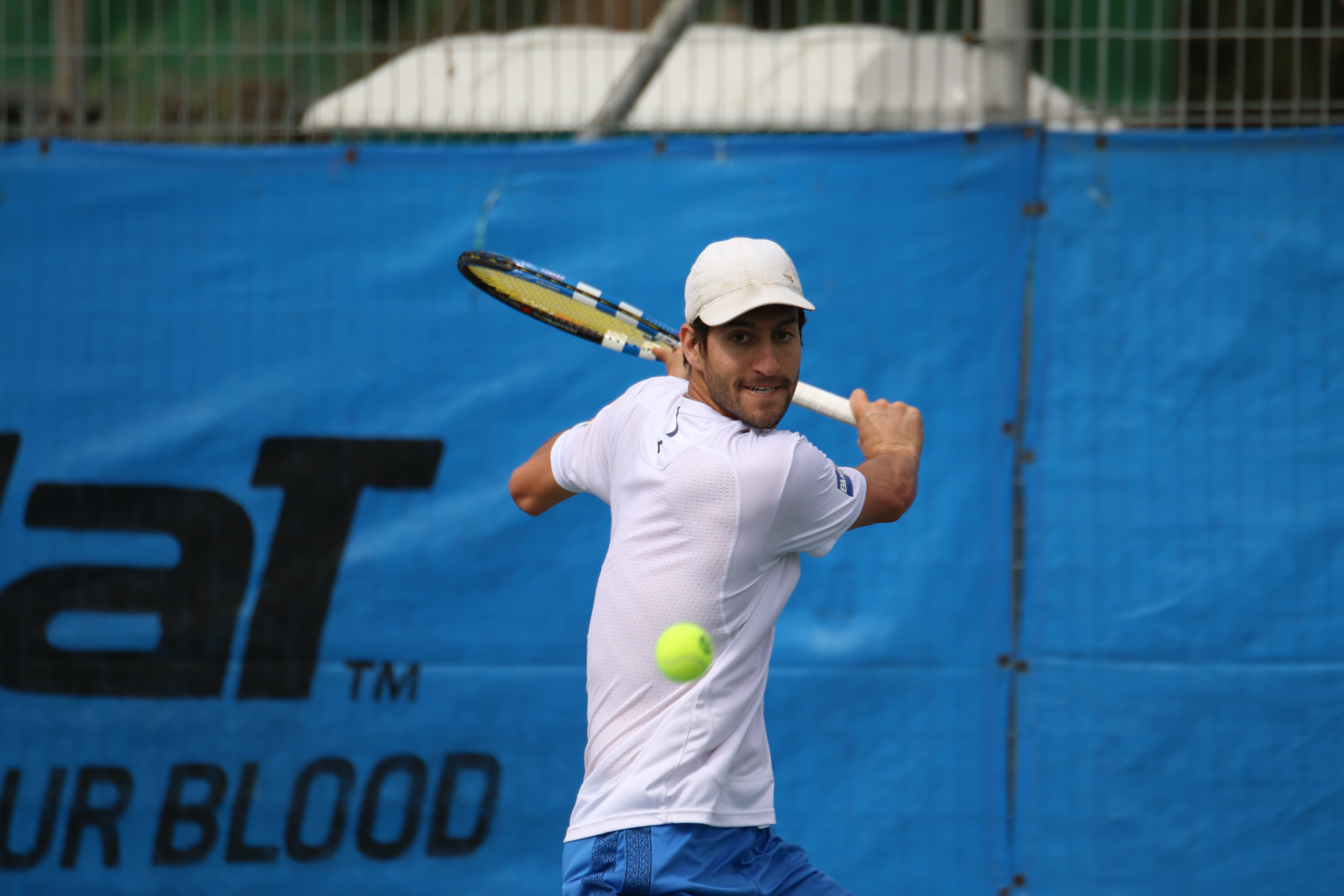
Weintraub in 2016

=== Singles: 24 (18–10) ===
Legend (singles)
ATP Challenger Tour Finals (0–0)
ATP Challengers (0–4)
ITF Futures (18–6)

Result	No.	Date	Tournament	Surface	Opponent	Score
Win	1.	12 August 2006	Dakar, Senegal	Hard	(Ivory Coast) Valentin Sanon	4–6, 6–4, 6–4
Loss	1.	18 August 2007	Bukhara, Uzbekistan	Hard	(Uzbekistan) Denis Istomin	6–3, 1–6, 4–6
Loss	2.	31 October 2009	Binh Duong, Vietnam	Hard	(New Zealand) Jose Statham	7–6^{(7–4)}, 6–7^{(4–7)}, 1–6
Loss	3.	22 May 2010	Durban, South Africa	Hard	(South Africa) Andrew Anderson	6–3, 3–6, 6–7^{(7–3)}
Loss	4.	10 July 2010	Bakio, Spain	Hard	(France) Fabrice Martin	3–6, 4–6
Win	2.	23 October 2010	Lagos, Nigeria	Hard	(India) Karan Rastogi	2–6, 6–4, 7–5
Win	3.	28 November 2010	Traralgon, Australia	Hard	(Australia) Samuel Groth	6–2, 6–4
Win	4.	21 May 2011	Ramat HaSharon, Israel	Hard	(United States) David Rice	6–3, 6–2
Win	5.	28 May 2011	Ramat HaSharon, Israel	Hard	(United States) David Rice	6–1, 6–1
Win	6.	4 June 2011	Ashkelon, Israel	Hard	(Italy) Federico Gaio	6–4, 6–2
Loss	5.	3 September 2011	Bangkok, Thailand	Hard	(Germany) Cedrik-Marcel Stebe	5–7, 1–6
Win	7.	30 January 2012	Eilat, Israel	Hard	(Italy) Claudio Grassi	6–1, 6–1
Win	8.	1 April 2012	Herzliya, Israel	Hard	(France) Axel Michon	7–5, 6–0
Win	9.	5 May 2012	Ashkelon, Israel	Hard	(China) Yu Chang	6–3, 6–2
Loss	6.	20 May 2012	Fergana, Uzbekistan	Hard	(India) Yuki Bhambri	3–6, 3–6
Win	10.	20 January 2014	Eilat, Israel	Hard	(France) Martin Vaïsse	6–0, 6–1
Win	11.	27 January 2014	Eilat, Israel	Hard	(Croatia) Mate Delić	6–4, 6–2
Loss	7.	16 March 2014	Guangzhou, China	Hard	(Republic of Ireland) Louk Sorensen	7–5, 5–7, 4–6
Win	12.	27 April 2015	Ashkelon, Israel	Hard	(Russia) Evgeny Karlovskiy	6–3, 6–4
Win	13.	4 May 2015	Ashkelon, Israel	Hard	(United Kingdom) Toby Martin	7–5, 6–4
Win	14.	1 June 2015	Ramat Gan, Israel	Hard	(France) Maxime Janvier	6–1, 6–3
Loss	8.	13 June 2015	Ramat Gan, Israel	Hard	(France) Sebastian Boltz	3–6, 6–2, 3–6
Win	15.	20 June 2015	Ramat Gan, Israel	Hard	(France) Sebastian Boltz	6–7^{(2–7)}, 6–4, 6–1
Loss	9.	22 August 2015	Minsk, Belarus	Hard	(France) Sebastian Boltz	6–2, 4–6, 2–6
Loss	10.	20 October 2015	Nanchang, China	Hard	(Germany) Peter Gojowczyk	2–6, 1–6
Win	16.	13 December 2015	Ramat Gan, Israel	Hard	(Israel) Dekel Bar	6–3, 6–2
Win	17.	21 February 2016	Ramat Gan, Israel	Hard	(France) Yannick Jankovits	6–4, 6–1
Win	18.	October 9, 2016	Ramat Hasharon, Israel	Hard	(United States) Peter Kobelt	6–4, 7–6^{(8–6)}

=== Doubles (15–12) ===
Legend (doubles)
ATP Challengers (3–3)
ITF Futures (13–9)

Result	No.	Date	Tournament	Surface	Partnering	Opponents	Score
Win	1.	11 March 2006	Haifa, Israel	Hard	(Israel) Dekel Valtzer	(Russia) Sergei Krotiouk (Israel) Alexei Milner	6–1, 6–4
Win	2.	8 July 2006	Istanbul, Turkey	Hard	(Israel) Dekel Valtzer	(Australia) Matthew Ebden (Australia) Aidan Fitzgerald	6–2, 7–5
Win	3.	5 August 2006	Dakar, Senegal	Hard	(Israel) Amit Inbar	(Togo) Komlavi Loglo (Ivory Coast) Valentin Sanon	6–3, 6–4
Win	4.	12 August 2006	Dakar, Senegal	Hard	(Israel) Amit Inbar	(United Kingdom) Amadeus Fulford-Jones (South Africa) Benjamin Janse van Rensburg	W/O
Loss	1.	24 March 2007	Ra'anana, Israel	Hard	(Israel) Dekel Valtzer	(France) Laurent Vigne (France) Pierrick Ysern	2–6, 1–6
Win	5.	9 June 2007	Ankara, Turkey	Clay	(Israel) Dekel Valtzer	(Germany) Alex Satschko (Germany) Marc-Andre Stratling	2–6, 6–4, 7–5
Win	6.	16 June 2007	İzmir, Turkey	Hard	(Israel) Dekel Valtzer	(Brazil) Rodrigo-Antonio Grilli (Brazil) Marcio Torres	6–3, 7–6^{(7–4)}
Win	7.	23 June 2007	Istanbul, Turkey	Hard	(Israel) Dekel Valtzer	(Israel) Guy Kubi (Israel) Alexei Milner	6–0, 6–1
Loss	2.	15 December 2007	Lagos, Nigeria	Hard	(Israel) Idan Mark	(India) Navdeep Singh (United Kingdom) Alexander Slabinsky	6–7^{(2–7)}, 6–3, [7–10]
Loss	3.	16 March 2008	Albufeira, Portugal	Hard	(United Kingdom) Chris Eaton	(United Kingdom) Neil Bamford (United Kingdom) Josh Goodall	3–6, 4–6
Win	8.	19 July 2008	Aptos, United States	Hard	(Israel) Noam Okun	(United States) Todd Widom (United States) Michael Yani	6–2, 6–1
Loss	4.	29 November 2008	Ramat HaSharon, Israel	Hard	(Germany) Sebastian Rieschick	(Canada) Pierre-Ludovic Duclos (Israel) Amir Hadad	3–6 4–6
Loss	5.	29 August 2009	Ramat HaSharon, Israel	Hard	(France) Ludovic Walter	(United States) John Paul Fruttero (New Zealand) G.D. Jones	2–6, 6–4, [5–10]
Win	9.	12 September 2009	Ramat HaSharon, Israel	Hard	(New Zealand) Marcus Daniell	(United States) John Paul Fruttero (New Zealand) G.D. Jones	6–1, 6–7^{(5–7)}, [10–5]
Loss	6.	4 December 2009	Santo Domingo, Dominican Republic	Hard	(United Kingdom) Alexander Slabinsky	(United States) Adam El Mihdawy (United States) Blake Strode	3–6, 6–2, [7–10]
Win	10.	23 October 2010	Lagos, Nigeria	Hard	(Netherlands) Boy Westerhof	(Belgium) Niels Desein (France) Laurent Rochette	W/O
Win	11.	30 October 2010	Lagos, Nigeria	Hard	(Netherlands) Boy Westerhof	(South Africa) Raven Klaasen (South Africa) Ruan Roelofse	5–7, 6–4, [10–6]
Win	12.	29 January 2011	Eilat, Israel	Hard	(Israel) Tal Eros	(Israel) Alon Faiman (Israel) Tomer Hodorov	6–3, 6–1
Loss	7.	21 May 2011	Ramat HaSharon, Israel	Hard	(Israel) Tal Eros	(United Kingdom) David Rice (United Kingdom) Sean Thornley	6–3, 3–6, [9–11]
Win	13.	28 May 2011	Ramat HaSharon, Israel	Hard	(United States) John Paul Fruttero	(United Kingdom) David Rice (United Kingdom) Sean Thornley	6–7^{(4–7)}, 7–6^{(7–3)}, [13–11]
Win	14.	4 March 2012	Singapore, Singapore	Hard	(Slovakia) Kamil Čapkovič	(Chinese Taipei) Hsieh Cheng-peng (Chinese Taipei) Lee Hsin-han	6–4, 6–4
Loss	8.	5 May 2012	Ashkelon, Israel	Hard	(Israel) Saar Steele	(China) Yu Chang (China) Li Zhe	3–6, 2–6
Loss	9.	10 February 2013	Bergamo, Italy	Hard	(Italy) Claudio Grassi	(Slovakia) Karol Beck (Slovakia) Andrej Martin	3–6, 6–3, [8–10]
Win	15.	25 January 2014	Eilat, Israel	Hard	(Chinese Taipei) Huang Liang-chi	(United Kingdom) Marcus Willis (United Kingdom) Lewis Burton	6–3, 7–6^{(11–9)}
Loss	10.	1 February 2014	Eilat, Israel	Hard	(Italy) Claudio Grassi	(United Kingdom) Marcus Willis (United Kingdom) Lewis Burton	3–6 5–7
Loss	11.	2 March 2014	Guangzhou, China	Hard	(Chinese Taipei) Lee Hsin-han	(Thailand) Sanchai Ratiwatana (Thailand) Sonchat Ratiwatana	2–6, 4–6
Loss	12.	19 September 2015	Nanchang, China	Hard	(Chinese Taipei) Lee Hsin-han	(France) Jonathan Eysseric (Estonia) Jürgen Zopp	4–6, 2–6
Win	16.	25 October 2015	Ningbo, China	Hard	(Israel) Dudi Sela	(Croatia) Nikola Mektić (Croatia) Franko Škugor	6–3, 3–6, [10–6]
