= Peerakiat Siriluethaiwattana =

Thai tennis player

- Country (sports): Thailand
- Born: 16 August 1989 (age 36) Kampaengpetch, Thailand
- Height: 1.75 m (5 ft 9 in)
- Plays: Left-handed (two-handed backhand)
- Prize money: $37,879

Singles
- Career record: 2–5 (at ATP Tour level, Grand Slam level, and in Davis Cup)
- Career titles: 0
- Highest ranking: No. 704 (7 June 2010)

Grand Slam singles results
- Australian Open Junior: 1R (2007)
- French Open Junior: 1R (2007)
- Wimbledon Junior: 1R (2007)
- US Open Junior: 3R (2007)

Doubles
- Career record: 0–0 (at ATP Tour level, Grand Slam level, and in Davis Cup)
- Career titles: 1 ITF
- Highest ranking: No. 567 (13 August 2012)

Grand Slam doubles results
- Australian Open Junior: 1R (2007)
- French Open Junior: 1R (2007)
- Wimbledon Junior: 1R (2007)
- US Open Junior: 2R (2007)
- Last updated on: 7 July 2017.

Peerakiat Siriluethaiwattana (born 16 August 1989) is a former Thai tennis player. He was born in Kampaengpetch, Thailand. He lives in Bangkok, Thailand. Siriluethaiwattana had a career high ATP singles ranking of 704 achieved on 7 June 2010. He also had a career high ATP doubles ranking of 567 achieved on 13 August 2012.

Siriluethaiwattana represented Thailand in the Davis Cup.
