= Huang Liang-chi =

Taiwanese tennis player

Huang Liang-chi 黃亮祺
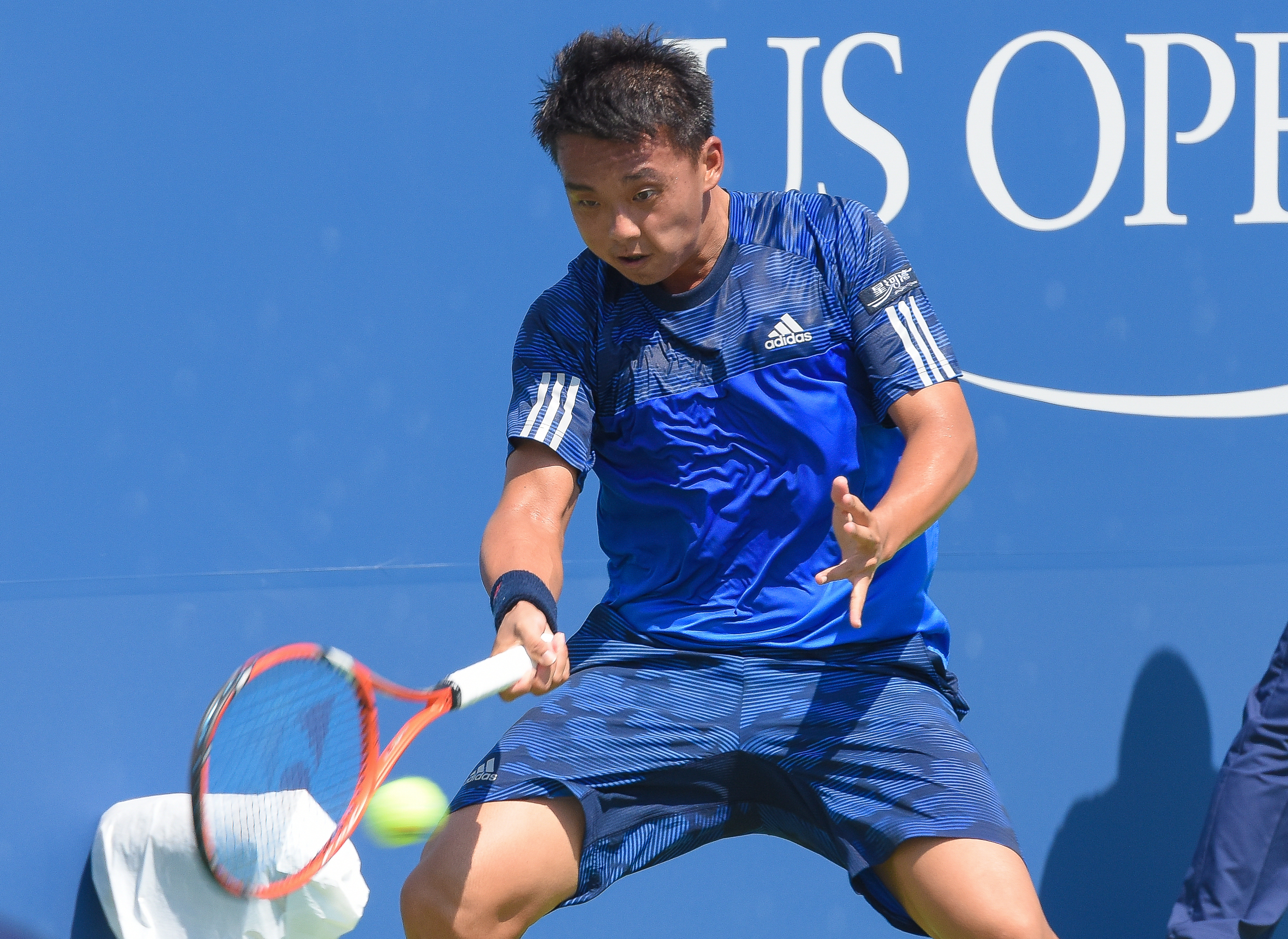
- Huang at the 2015 US Open Qualifying Tournament
- Country (sports): Chinese Taipei
- Born: 8 March 1992 (age 33) Tainan, Taiwan
- Plays: Right Handed (Double Handed Backhand)
- Prize money: $146,846

Singles
- Career record: 3–1
- Career titles: 0
- Highest ranking: No. 223 (13 July 2015)

Grand Slam singles results
- Australian Open: Q1 (2014)
- US Open: Q1 (2015)

Doubles
- Career record: 0–2
- Career titles: 0
- Highest ranking: No. 172 (11 August 2014)

Huang Liang-chi
Medal record

Men's Tennis

Representing Chinese Taipei

Summer Universiade
Silver medal – second place	2015 Gwangju	Men's Team
Silver medal – second place	2013 Kazan	Men's Team
Bronze medal – third place	2011 Shenzhen	Men's Team

Huang Liang-chi
- Traditional Chinese: 黃亮祺
- Simplified Chinese: 黄亮祺
Transcriptions
Standard Mandarin
- Hanyu Pinyin: Huáng Liàngqí

Huang Liang-chi (Chinese: 黃亮祺; born 8 March 1992) is a Taiwanese tennis player playing on the ATP Challenger Tour. On 11 August 2014, he reached his highest ATP doubles ranking of No. 172 and his highest singles ranking of No. 223 achieved on 13 July 2015.

== Tour titles ==
Legend
Grand Slam (0)
ATP Masters Series (0)
ATP Tour (0)
Challengers (1)

=== Doubles ===
Outcome	No.	Date	Tournament	Surface	Partner	Opponents	Score
Winner	1.	1 September 2013	(Thailand) Bangkok	Hard	(Chinese Taipei) Chen Ti	(South Korea) Jeong Suk-Young (South Korea) Nam Ji Sung	6–3, 6–2
