= Yūichi Sugita =

Japanese tennis player (born 1988)

Yūichi Sugita 杉田祐一
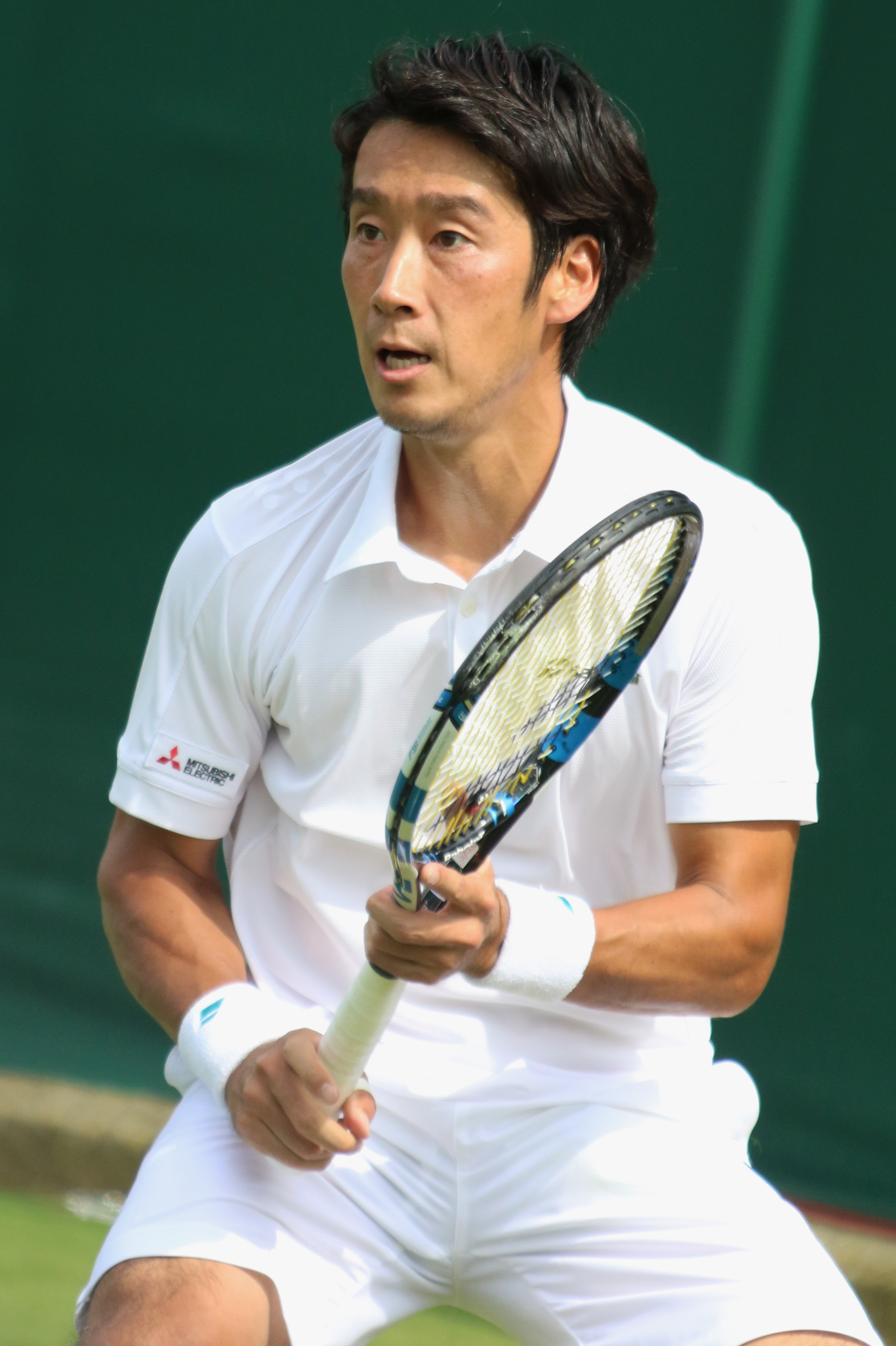
- Yūichi Sugita in 2017
- Country (sports): Japan
- Residence: Tokyo, Japan
- Born: 18 September 1988 (age 38) Sendai, Japan
- Height: 1.75 m (5 ft 9 in)
- Turned pro: October 2006
- Retired: 2023
- Plays: Right-handed (two-handed backhand)
- Prize money: $2,978,289

Singles
- Career record: 55–90
- Career titles: 1
- Highest ranking: No. 36 (9 October 2017)

Grand Slam singles results
- Australian Open: 2R (2018, 2020)
- French Open: 1R (2017, 2018, 2020)
- Wimbledon: 2R (2017)
- US Open: 2R (2017)

Other tournaments
- Olympic Games: 2R (2016)

Doubles
- Career record: 2–14
- Career titles: 0
- Highest ranking: No. 363 (25 August 2014)

Grand Slam doubles results
- French Open: 1R (2018)
- US Open: 1R (2017)

Team competitions
- Hopman Cup: RR (2018)
Medal record
Representing Japan
Men's tennis
Asian Games
Bronze medal – third place	2014 Incheon	Singles
Bronze medal – third place	2014 Incheon	Team
Bronze medal – third place	2014 Incheon	Mixed doubles
- Last updated on: 9 January 2023.

Yūichi Sugita (杉田 祐一, Sugita Yūichi; born 18 September 1988) is a Japanese former professional tennis player. He has won one ATP singles title, and achieved a career-high singles ranking of world No. 36 on 9 October 2017.

== Career ==
=== Juniors ===
As a junior Sugita compiled a win–loss record of 34–19 (and 26–18 in doubles), reaching as high as No. 73 in the combined world rankings in February 2006. He competed in singles and doubles at the Australian Open in both 2005 and 2006, reaching the singles second round of the latter.

=== 2007–09 ===
Sugita had won eight ITF Futures titles in Japan and Indonesia. From 2009, he started to play mainly in ATP Challenger Tour. Sugita was received wildcard for the 2008 Japan Open to make his first ATP main draw. He finished 2009 as ranked world no.299.

=== 2010 ===
After reaching semifinal in Bernie Challenger, Sugita claimed his first challenger title in Kyoto. He defeated Australian Matthew Ebden in final, and he break him into world top 200 for the first time as ranked no.186. Sugita advanced to final round of qualifying in the 2010 US Open, losing to Lukáš Rosol in two sets. In November, Sugita won back-to-back Futures titles in Thailand, and reached final in the Toyota Challenger, but lost to fellow Japanese Tatsuma Ito in straight sets.

=== 2011 ===
Sugita started the season by playing the Chennai Open as qualifier, and recorded his first ATP main draw win against Dustin Brown in three sets. He lost to eighth seed Robin Haase in the second round. He represented Japan at 2011 Davis Cup World Group play-offs against India, winning over Somdev Devvarman in the singles rubber, and Japan promoted to 2012 Davis Cup World Group.

=== 2012 ===
Yūichi started his 2012 campaign by making it to the quarterfinals of the Chennai Open before falling to Nicolás Almagro in three close sets, knocking out eighth seed Oliver Rochus and Lu Yen-hsun on the way. After competing in ATP World Tour events in Asian swing, Sugita became the runners-up of the Bangkok Challenger and Seoul Challenger. He achieved his career-high ranking of world no.116 in November.

In Grand Slam qualifying, Sugita had reached the third round twice in 2012 at Australian Open and Wimbledon, but he lost in both matches.

=== 2013 ===
Sugita won through the opening round in the Hall of Fame Tennis Championships, against Canadian Jesse Levine in straight sets. The Next round, he was defeated by third seed Igor Sijsling. In Asian Challenger events, Sugita won the Shanghai Challenger, winning over his countryman Hiroki Moriya, and reached the final in Toyota.

=== 2014 ===
Yūichi qualified for 2014 Wimbledon Championships by defeating Marco Chiudinelli of Switzerland, 6–4, 6–2, 7–5. It marked the first time he qualified for a Grand Slam after 17 failed qualifying campaigns dating back to 2009. He had previously reached the final round of qualifying at Slams four times, and he dropped decisive sets in three of those matches. He lost to 19th seed Feliciano López in the first round with three tiebreakers.

In later season, Sugita earned men's singles bronze medal in the 2014 Asian Games at Incheon, where he beat Temur Ismailov of Uzbekistan in the quarterfinal. He also earned bronze medals of men's team and mixed doubles. Afterwards, he won his third challenger title in Pune by beating Adrián Menéndez Maceiras in the final.

=== 2015 ===
Sugita won through the qualifying at the 2015 Wimbledon Championships for the second consecutive year in this tournament, losing to Blaž Kavčič in the first round. After this event, he reached the second rounds in Newport and Bogotá, defeating Ryan Harrison and Nicolás Barrientos. At Thai's challenger circuit, he won his fourth challenger title in Bangkok, and fifth in Hua Hin.

=== 2016: Top 100, Olympics ===
Sugita qualified for the 2016 Australian Open main draw for the first time, but lost to 23rd seed Gaël Monfils in the first round.

In February, he claimed his second Kyoto challenger title by beating Zhang Ze in the final. This result launched him into the world top 100 for the first time in his career, climbing No. 99.

In June, he reached the second round of the Halle Open after beating Taylor Fritz in three sets. He then lost to last year's runner-up Andreas Seppi in straight sets.

Sugita finished the year ranked at No. 112.

=== 2017: First ATP world tour title ===
In March, Sugita re-entered the ATP top 100 after winning ATP Challenger Tour titles in Yokohama, Japan and Shenzhen, China. In April he made it into the main draw of the Barcelona Masters as a "Lucky Loser", and went on to defeat Tommy Robredo, Richard Gasquet and Pablo Carreño Busta before losing to Dominic Thiem in the quarter-finals. Following this success, he reached #73 on the ATP rankings.

In June–July, he reached his maiden ATP World Tour level final in Antalya, Turkey. In the final Sugita defeated Adrian Mannarino 6–1, 7–6, becoming the third Japanese man to win an ATP title, preceded by Shuzo Matsuoka and Kei Nishikori.

He beat Brydan Klein in Wimbledon, marking the first time he'd reached the second round of a Grand Slam tournament, losing next up to Mannarino. In August, Sugita won two rounds in the Masters 1000 tournament at Cincinnati before losing to eventual champion Grigor Dimitrov. He lost in the 2nd round of the US Open to Leonardo Mayer, having earlier defeated Geoffrey Blancaneaux. In Chengdu, China he won 3 rounds before losing to eventual champion Denis Istomin. In October Sugita advanced to the 3rd round in Tokyo; lost in the 1st round in Shanghai; advanced to the 3rd round in Stockholm; at this time ranked #37 in the world, lost in the 1st round in Basel, Switzerland; and lost in the 1st round in Paris.

=== 2018: First Top 10 Wins ===
Sugita and Naomi Osaka represented Japan in the mixed-gender 2018 Hopman Cup. He lost his singles match to Roger Federer 6–4, 6–3, but his leaping overhead smash delighted the fans and was included in most compilation clips of early 2018 season highlights.

At the 2018 Australian Open Sugita earned his first win over a Top 10 player by defeating world number 9 Jack Sock in four sets. He lost in the next round to Ivo Karlović. In February he lost in the first round in Rotterdam to eventual losing finalist Grigor Dimitrov. In March he was defeated by Horacio Zeballos in the first round at Indian Wells, and by Robin Haase in the first round at Miami. In April he lost in the first round to Jan-Lennard Struff at Monte-Carlo, Guillermo García López at Barcelona, and Yannick Maden in Munich. In May he lost in the first round to Philipp Kohlschreiber in Madrid and to Ryan Harrison in Rome.

In June Sugita lost in the first round of the French Open to Horacio Zeballos. Later in the month he lost in the second round in s-Hertogenbosch to Marius Copil; and the following week at Halle beat world #7 Dominic Thiem in straight sets, in what he said was "my best match in my career", before losing in the quarterfinal to Denis Kudla. At Antalya, Turkey, Sugita lost in the second round to Pierre-Hugues Herbert. In July he lost at Wimbledon to Bradley Klahn in the first round. In August he lost in the first round to Vincent Millot at Washington; lost in the first round to Ilya Ivashka at Toronto; lost in the first round of qualifying at Cincinnati; lost in the first round to Leonardo Mayer in Winston-Salem; and lost in the first round of the US Open to Richard Gasquet. Sugita started the week after the US Open with a record of 8 wins and 22 losses for the year, and his ranking was #98 in the world. In October he received a wild card entry into the Tokyo Open, and lost in the first round to countryman Kei Nishikori.

=== 2019: Tenth Challenger title ===
In January, ranked No. 146 in the world, Sugita lost in the second qualifying round for the Australian Open. In June, ranked No. 248, he qualified for the main draw at Wimbledon, where in the first round he lost to Rafael Nadal. In September, ranked No. 134, he lost in the second round of qualifying for the US Open.

In October, Sugita lost in the qualifying rounds for the Stockholm Open, but made it into the main draw as a lucky loser and then won three matches before losing in the semifinals. It moved him up 22 spots in the rankings, to No. 107.

=== 2020: Twentieth Challenger final ===
In January he started the year by reaching the final of the ATP Challenger Tour event in Nouméa, where he lost to J. J. Wolf. The following week, ranked No. 89, Sugita received an automatic entry into the Australian Open. He defeated Elliot Benchetrit in the first round, then lost to Andrey Rublev in the second. In his next tournament in Pune, he won against Viktor Troicki by retirement, before losing in the quarterfinals to Ričardas Berankis.

In September he lost in the first round of the U.S. Open to Ugo Humbert, and a few weeks later, ranked No. 94 in the world, lost in the first round of the French Open to Casper Ruud.

=== 2021: Second Olympics ===
Sugita started the year ranked No. 102 in the world. In February he lost in the first round of the Australian Open to Bernard Tomic. In March, in a Challenger Tour event in Lugano, Switzerland, he won three rounds and then lost in the semi-final to eventual champion Dominic Stephan Stricker. In June, ranked No. 110, he lost in the first round of Wimbledon to Richard Gasquet. In late August, ranked No. 131, he won twice before losing in the final qualifying round of the US Open. He received an entry into the main draw as a lucky loser, where he lost in the first round to number eight seed Casper Ruud.

=== 2022: Out of top 1000 ===
In May, ranked No. 265, Sugita lost in the first qualifying round of the 2022 French Open against Camilo Ugo Carabelli. On 26 September 2022, his ranking had fallen to No. 1090.

=== 2023: Retirement ===
In January, ranked No. 913, he reached the second round of qualifying at the 2023 Australian Open using a protected ranking. In July, Sugita announced his retirement from professional tennis.

== ATP career finals ==
=== Singles: 1 (1 title) ===
Legend (singles) Grand Slam tournaments (0–0) ATP World Tour Finals (0–0) ATP World Tour Masters 1000 (0–0) ATP World Tour 500 Series (0–0) ATP World Tour 250 Series (1–0)	Titles by surface Hard (0–0) Clay (0–0) Grass (1–0) Carpet (0–0)

Result	W–L	Date	Tournament	Tier	Surface	Opponent	Score
Win	1–0	Jul 2017	Antalya Open, Turkey	250 Series	Grass	(France) Adrian Mannarino	6–1, 7–6^{(7–4)}

== Challenger and Futures finals ==
=== Singles: 36 (23 titles, 13 runners-up) ===
legend (Singles)
ATP Challenger Tour (11–9)
ITF Futures (12–4)

Result	W–L	date	Tournament	Tier	Surface	Opponent	Score
Loss	0–1	Jun 2006	Japan F7, Karuizawa	Futures	Clay	(Japan) Satoshi Iwabuchi	5–7, 2–6
Win	1–1	Sep 2006	Japan F9, Osaka	Futures	Carpet	(Chinese Taipei) Hsin-Han lee	6–2, 6–3
Loss	1–2	Sep 2006	Japan F10, Sapporo	Futures	Carpet	(United States) James Pade	6–4, 3–6, 4–6
Win	2–2	Jun 2008	Japan F6, Akishima	Futures	Carpet	(Japan) Tasuku Iwami	6–3,4–6, 6–3
Win	3–2	Jul 2008	Japan F7, Ariake, Tokyo	Futures	Hard	(Japan) Tasuku Iwami	3–6, 6–0, 7–5
Win	4–2	Aug 2008	Indonesia F1, Jakarta	Futures	Hard	(South Korea) Young-Jun Kim	6–1, 6–0
Win	5–2	Aug 2008	Indonesia F2, Balikpapan	Futures	Hard	(Australia) Bernard Tomic	6–3, 6–7^{(6–8)}, 6–3
Win	6–2	Oct 2008	Japan F11. Tokyo	Futures	Hard(i)	(Japan) Hiroki Moriya	6–2, 7–5
Loss	6–3	Mar 2009	Japan F1, Tokyo	Futures	Hard(i)	(Chinese Taipei) Chu-Huan Yi	2–6, 7–6^{(7–1)}, 5–7
Loss	6-4	Mar 2009	Japan F3, Kofu	Futures	Hard(i)	(South Korea) Jae-Sung An	7–5, 4–6, 6–7^{(5–7)}
Win	7-4	Jul 2009	Japan F7, Sapporo	Futures	Clay	(Japan) Yuichi Ito	6-3, 7–5
Win	8-4	Oct 2009	Japan F9, Yokohama	Futures	Clay(i)	(Slovakia) Kamil Čapkovič	6–4, 6–3
Win	9-4	Mar 2010	Kyoto, Japan	Challenger	Carpet (i)	(Australia) Matthew Ebden	4–6, 6–4, 6–1
Win	10-4	Nov 2010	Thailand F4, Khon Kaen	Futures	Hard	(Japan) Arata Onozawa	6-4, 6–2
Win	11-4	Nov 2010	Thailand F5, Nonthaburi	Futures	Hard	(Croatia) Roko Karanušić	6–4, 6–1
Loss	11-5	Nov 2010	Toyota, Japan	Challenger	Carpet (i)	(Japan) Tatsuma Ito	4–6, 2–6
Win	12-5	Jul 2012	Indonesia F2, Jakarta	Futures	Hard	(Chinese Taipei) Ti Chen	6-2, 7–5
Loss	12-6	Sep 2012	Bangkok, Thailand	Challenger	Hard	(Israel) Dudi Sela	1–6, 5–7
Win	13-6	Oct 2012	Japan F8, Kashiwa	Futures	Hard	(South Korea) Yongkyu Lim	7–6^{(7–2)}, 6–2
Loss	13-7	Oct 2012	Seoul, South Korea	Challenger	Hard	(Chinese Taipei) Lu Yen-hsun	3–6, 6–7^{(4–7)}
Win	14-7	Sep 2013	Shanghai, China	Challenger	Hard	(Japan) Hiroki Moriya	6–3, 6–3
Loss	14-8	Nov 2013	Toyota, Japan	Challenger	Carpet (i)	(Australia) Matthew Ebden	3–6, 2–6
Loss	14-9	Mar 2014	Guangzhou, China	Challenger	Hard	(Slovenia) Blaž Rola	7–6^{(7–4)}, 4–6, 3–6
Win	15-9	Oct 2014	Pune, India	Challenger	Hard	(Spain) Adrián Menéndez Maceiras	6–7^{(1–7)}, 6–4, 6–4
Loss	15-10	Apr 2015	Saint-Brieuc, France	Challenger	Hard (i)	(France) Nicolas Mahut	6–3, 6–7^{(3–7)}, 4–6
Win	16-10	Sep 2015	Bangkok, Thailand	Challenger	Hard	(Argentina) Marco Trungelliti	6–4, 6–2
Win	17-10	Nov 2015	Hua Hin, Thailand	Challenger	Hard	(France) Stéphane Robert	6–2, 1–6, 6–3
Win	18-10	Feb 2016	Kyoto, Japan	Challenger	Carpet (i)	(China) Zhang Ze	5–7, 6–3, 6–4
Win	19-10	Mar 2017	Yokohama, Japan	Challenger	Hard	(South Korea) Soon-woo Kwon	6–4, 2–6, 7–6^{(7–2)}
Win	20-10	Mar 2017	Shenzhen, China	Challenger	Hard	(Slovenia) Blaž Kavčič	7–6^{(8–6)}, 6–4
Win	21-10	Jun 2017	Surbiton, UK	Challenger	Grass	(Australia) Jordan Thompson	7–6^{(9–7)}, 7–6^{(10–8)}
Win	22-10	Jul 2019	Binghamton, Usa	Challenger	Hard	(Brazil) João Menezes	7–6^{(7–2)}, 1–6, 6–2
Loss	22-11	Aug 2019	Chengdu, China	Challenger	Hard	(South Korea) Chung Hyeon	4–6, 3–6
Win	23-11	Aug 2019	Yokkaichi, Japan	Challenger	Hard	(Australia) James Duckworth	3–6, 6–3, 7–6^{(7–1)}
Loss	23-12	Nov 2019	Kobe, Japan	Challenger	Hard (i)	(Japan) Yosuke Watanuki	2–6, 4–6
Loss	23-13	Jan 2020	Nouméa, New Caledonia	Challenger	Hard (i)	(United States) J. J. Wolf	2–6, 2–6

=== Doubles: 1 (1 Loss) ===
Legend
ATP Challenger Tour (0–1)

Outcome	W–L	Date	Tournament	Tier	Surface	Partner	Opponents	Score
Loss	0–1	Sep 2010	Bangkok, Thailand	Challenger	Hard	(Denmark) Frederik Nielsen	(Thailand) Sanchai Ratiwatana (Thailand) Sonchat Ratiwatana	3–6, 5–7

== Singles performance timeline ==
Key
W	F	SF	QF	#R	RR	Q#	P#	DNQ	A	Z#	PO	G	S	B	NMS	NTI	P	NH

(W) winner; (F) finalist; (SF) semifinalist; (QF) quarterfinalist; (#R) rounds 4, 3, 2, 1; (RR) round-robin stage; (Q#) qualification round; (P#) preliminary round; (DNQ) did not qualify; (A) absent; (Z#) Davis/Fed Cup Zonal Group (with number indication) or (PO) play-off; (G) gold, (S) silver or (B) bronze Olympic/Paralympic medal; (NMS) not a Masters tournament; (NTI) not a Tier I tournament; (P) postponed; (NH) not held; (SR) strike rate (events won / competed); (W–L) win–loss record.
To avoid confusion and double counting, these charts are updated at the conclusion of a tournament or when the player's participation has ended.

Current through the 2021 US Open.

Tournament	2006	2007	2008	2009	2010	2011	2012	2013	2014	2015	2016	2017	2018	2019	2020	2021	2022	2023	SR	W–L
Grand Slam tournaments
Australian Open	A	A	A	A	Q1	Q2	Q3	Q1	Q3	Q3	1R	Q2	2R	Q2	2R	1R	A	Q2	0 / 4	2–4
French Open	A	A	A	A	Q1	A	Q1	A	Q1	Q1	A	1R	1R	A	1R	A	Q1		0 / 3	0–3
Wimbledon	A	A	A	A	Q1	Q2	Q3	Q1	1R	1R	Q1	2R	1R	1R	NH	1R	Q1		0 / 6	1–6
US Open	A	A	A	Q1	Q3	Q1	Q1	Q1	Q3	Q2	Q2	2R	1R	Q2	1R	1R	A		0 / 4	1–4
Win–loss	0–0	0–0	0–0	0–0	0–0	0–0	0–0	0–0	0–1	0–1	0–1	2–3	1–4	0–1	1–3	0–3	0–0		0 / 17	4–17
National representation
Olympic Games	Not Held		A	Not Held			A	Not Held			2R	Not Held				1R	Not Held		0 / 2	1–2
Davis Cup	A	Z1	Z1	Z1	Z1	PO	1R	PO	A	A	1R	1R	1R	1R	A	A	A		0 / 5	8–6
ATP World Tour Masters 1000
Indian Wells Masters	A	A	A	A	A	A	A	A	A	A	Q2	A	1R	A	NH	A	A		0 / 1	0–1
Miami Open	A	A	A	A	A	A	Q2	A	A	A	Q1	A	1R	A	NH	A	A		0 / 1	0–1
Monte Carlo Masters	A	A	A	A	A	A	A	A	A	A	A	Q2	1R	A	NH	A	A		0 / 1	0–1
Madrid Open	A	A	A	A	A	A	A	A	A	A	A	A	1R	A	NH	A	A		0 / 1	0–1
Italian Open	A	A	A	A	A	A	A	A	A	A	A	A	1R	A	Q1	A	A		0 / 1	0–1
Canadian Open	A	A	A	A	A	A	A	A	Q2	A	1R	1R	1R	A	NH	A	A		0 / 3	0–3
Cincinnati Masters	A	A	A	A	A	A	A	A	A	A	3R	QF	Q1	A	Q1	A	A		0 / 2	5–2
Shanghai Masters	Not Held			A	A	A	A	Q1	Q1	A	1R	1R	A	A	NH				0 / 2	0–2
Paris Masters	A	A	A	A	A	A	A	A	A	A	Q1	1R	A	A	A	A	A		0 / 1	0–1
Win–loss	0–0	0–0	0–0	0–0	0–0	0–0	0–0	0–0	0–0	0–0	2–3	3–4	0–6	0–0	0–0	0–0	0–0		0 / 13	5–13
Career statistics
	2006	2007	2008	2009	2010	2011	2012	2013	2014	2015	2016	2017	2018	2019	2020	2021	2022		SR	W–L
Titles / Finals	0 / 0	0 / 0	0 / 0	0 / 0	0 / 0	0 / 0	0 / 0	0 / 0	0 / 0	0 / 0	0 / 0	1 / 1	0 / 0	0 / 0	0 / 0	0 / 0	0 / 0		0 / 0	
Overall win–loss	0–0	2–1	1–1	0–2	0–2	2–3	2–3	2–3	0–3	2–6	6–10	22–16	8–24	3–4	3–6	2–6	0–0		55–90	
Year-end ranking	498	1006	341	299	180	235	117	170	131	126	112	40	145	103	102	162	1136		37.93%	

== Wins over top 10 players ==
- He has a 2–7 record against players who were, at the time the match was played, ranked in the top 10.

Season	2006–2017	2018	2019	2020	2021	Total
Wins	0	2	0	0	0	2

#	Player	Rank	Event	Surface	Rd	Score
2018
1.	(United States) Jack Sock	9	Australian Open, Melbourne, Australia	Hard	1R	6–1, 7–6^{(7–4)}, 5–7, 6–3
2.	(Austria) Dominic Thiem	7	Gerry Weber Open, Halle, Germany	Grass	2R	6–2, 7–5
