= Kittipong Wachiramanowong =

Thai tennis player (born 1990)

Kittipong Wachiramanowong กิตติพงษ์ วชิรมโนวงศ์
- Country (sports): Thailand
- Residence: Bangkok, Thailand
- Born: January 25, 1990 (age 36) Bangkok, Thailand
- Height: 1.83 m (6 ft 0 in)
- Turned pro: 2009
- Retired: 2018 (last match)
- Plays: Right-handed (two-handed backhand)
- Prize money: $97,875

Singles
- Career record: 12–20
- Career titles: 0
- Highest ranking: No. 457 (8 March 2010)

Grand Slam singles results
- Australian Open Junior: 3R (2008)
- French Open Junior: 2R (2007)
- Wimbledon Junior: 1R (2007, 2008)
- US Open Junior: 1R (2007, 2008)

Doubles
- Career record: 2–4
- Career titles: 0
- Highest ranking: No. 249 (12 September 2011)

Grand Slam doubles results
- Australian Open Junior: 1R (2008)
- French Open Junior: 1R (2007, 2008)
- Wimbledon Junior: 2R (2007)
- US Open Junior: SF (2008)

Kittipong Wachiramanowong (Thai: กิตติพงษ์ วชิรมโนวงศ์; born 25 January 1990) is an inactive professional tennis player from Thailand.

== 2009 ==
Wachiramanowong received a wildcard for the PTT Thailand Open. He drew eighth seeded and World No. 56 John Isner, and he led a 5 games to 4 in the third set and served for the match. Wachiramanowong eventually lost 3–6, 6–3, 6–7^{(2)}.

== ATP career finals ==
=== Doubles: 1 (0–1) ===
Legend
ATP Challenger Tour

Finals by surface
Hard (0–0)
Clay (0–1)
Grass (0–0)
Carpet (0–0)

| Result | No. | Date | Tournament | Surface | Partner | Opponents | Score |
|---|---|---|---|---|---|---|---|
| Loss | 1. | 21 July 2012 | Anning, China | Clay | (South Africa) Ruan Roelofse | (Thailand) Sanchai Ratiwatana (Thailand) Sonchat Ratiwatana | 6–4, 6–7, [11–13] |
