= 2012 Busan Open Challenger Tennis – Singles =

Singles tournament at the 2012 Busan Open Challenger Tennis

Singles
- 2012 Busan Open Challenger Tennis

Final
- Champion: (Japan) Tatsuma Ito
- Runner-up: (Australia) John Millman
- Score: 6–4, 6–3

Events
Singles	Doubles
← 2011 ·	Busan Open Challenger Tennis	· 2013 →

Dudi Sela was the defending champion but decided not to participate.

Tatsuma Ito won the title defeating John Millman in the final 6–4, 6–3.

This tournament featured the fastest serve ever recorded by Sam Groth at 263.4 km/h (163.4 mph).

== Seeds ==
1. (Chinese Taipei) Yen-hsun Lu (first round)
2. (Japan) Tatsuma Ito (champion)
3. (Switzerland) Marco Chiudinelli (first round)
4. (South Africa) Rik de Voest (first round)
5. (South Africa) Izak van der Merwe (first round)
6. (Thailand) Danai Udomchoke (semifinals)
7. (Chinese Taipei) Tsung-hua Yang (semifinals)
8. (Israel) Amir Weintraub (quarterfinals)

== Draw ==
=== Key ===
- Q = Qualifier
- WC = Wild card
- LL = Lucky loser
- Alt = Alternate
- SE = Special exempt
- PR = Protected ranking
- ITF = ITF entry
- JE = Junior exempt
- w/o = Walkover
- r = Retired
- d = Defaulted
- SR = Special ranking

=== Finals ===
Semifinals
7	(Chinese Taipei) Tsung-hua Yang	6^{3}	7	6^{3}
(Australia) John Millman	7^{7}	5	7^{7}
6	(Thailand) Danai Udomchoke	5	6	3
2	(Japan) Tatsuma Ito	7	0	6

Final
(Australia) John Millman	4	3
2	(Japan) Tatsuma Ito	6	6

=== Top half ===
First round
1	(Chinese Taipei) Y-h Lu	4	2
(Mexico) D Garza	6	6
(Slovakia) I Klec	6	3	6
(Switzerland) A Bossel	2	6	3
Q	(Japan) K Takeuchi	2	6	4
WC	(South Korea) S-y Jeong	6	3	6
Q	(Indonesia) C Rungkat	4	3
7	(Chinese Taipei) T-h Yang	6	6
4	(South Africa) R de Voest	6	4	6^{3}
(Belarus) U Ignatik	3	6	7^{7}
(Japan) H Moriya	3	6^{7}
(Australia) S Groth	6	7^{9}
(Australia) Michael Look	6^{9}	4
(India) V Vardhan	7^{11}	6
(Australia) J Millman	4	6	6
5	(South Africa) I van der Merwe	6	3	4

Second round
(Mexico) D Garza	4	3
(Slovakia) I Klec	6	6
WC	(South Korea) S-y Jeong	3	5
7	(Chinese Taipei) T-h Yang	6	7
(Belarus) U Ignatik	6	6
(Australia) S Groth	4	3
(India) V Vardhan	4	3
(Australia) J Millman	6	6

Quarterfinals
(Slovakia) I Klec	3	5
7	(Chinese Taipei) T-h Yang	6	7
(Belarus) U Ignatik	6	3	2
(Australia) J Millman	2	6	6

Semifinals
7	(Chinese Taipei) T-h Yang	6^{3}	7	6^{3}
(Australia) J Millman	7^{7}	5	7^{7}

=== Bottom half ===
First round
6	(Thailand) D Udomchoke	6	4	7^{8}
(Chinese Taipei) J Wang	3	6	6^{6}
WC	(South Korea) J S Nam	3	3
(India) Y Bhambri	6	6
(South Africa) R Klaasen	5	6	1
(Denmark) F Nielsen	7	4	6
(China) Z Zhang	6	6
3	(Switzerland) M Chiudinelli	2	4
8	(Israel) A Weintraub	6	7^{13}
(Japan) Y Uchiyama	1	6^{11}
(Japan) T Matsui	3	6	6
WC	(South Korea) J-w Na	6	3	4
Q	(South Korea) Kim Cheong-eui	3	2
WC	(South Korea) H Chung	6	6
Q	(United States) M McClune	5	4
2	(Japan) T Ito	7	6

Second round
6	(Thailand) D Udomchoke	6	6
(India) Y Bhambri	0	3
(Denmark) F Nielsen	7^{11}	6
(China) Z Zhang	6^{9}	2
8	(Israel) A Weintraub	6	6
(Japan) T Matsui	1	1
WC	(South Korea) H Chung	2	7^{7}	2
2	(Japan) T Ito	6	6^{1}	6

Quarterfinals
6	(Thailand) D Udomchoke	7^{7}	6
(Denmark) F Nielsen	6^{4}	4
8	(Israel) A Weintraub	5	7^{7}	1
2	(Japan) T Ito	7	6^{3}	6

Semifinals
6	(Thailand) D Udomchoke	5	6	3
2	(Japan) T Ito	7	0	6
