= 2010 Busan Open Challenger Tennis – Doubles =

Doubles
- 2010 Busan Open Challenger Tennis

Final
- Champions: (Australia) Rameez Junaid (Austria) Alexander Peya
- Runners-up: (Canada) Pierre-Ludovic Duclos (Chinese Taipei) Yang Tsung-hua
- Score: 6–4, 7–5

Events
Singles	Doubles
← 2009 ·	Busan Open Challenger Tennis	· 2011 →

Sanchai Ratiwatana and Sonchat Ratiwatana were the defending champions, but they lost against Pierre-Ludovic Duclos and Yang Tsung-hua in the semifinals.
Rameez Junaid and Alexander Peya won in the final 6–4, 7–5 against Duclos and Yang.

== Seeds ==
1. (Thailand) Sanchai Ratiwatana / (Thailand) Sonchat Ratiwatana (semifinal)
2. (Australia) Rameez Junaid / (Austria) Alexander Peya (champions)
3. (Canada) Pierre-Ludovic Duclos / (Chinese Taipei) Yang Tsung-hua (final)
4. (Australia) Sadik Kadir / (India) Purav Raja (semifinal)

== Draw ==
=== Key ===
- Q = Qualifier
- WC = Wild card
- LL = Lucky loser
- Alt = Alternate
- SE = Special exempt
- PR = Protected ranking
- ITF = ITF entry
- JE = Junior exempt
- w/o = Walkover
- r = Retired
- d = Defaulted
- SR = Special ranking

=== Draw ===
First round
1	(Thailand) Sa Ratiwatana (Thailand) So Ratiwatana	6	7
Q	(Chinese Taipei) T Chen (Germany) S Rieschick	3	6
(Japan) H Kondo (Japan) G Soeda	3	6	[7]
(Slovakia) I Klec (Japan) J Mitsuhashi	6	3	[10]
3	(Canada) P-L Duclos (Chinese Taipei) T-h Yang	3	7	[14]
(Latvia) A Juška (Russia) A Sitak	6	6	[12]
(India) D Sharan (India) V Vardhan	4	4
WC	(South Korea) S-Y Jeong (South Korea) JS Nam	6	6
WC	(South Korea) J-S An (South Korea) Y-K Lim	7	6
WC	(South Korea) W-S Jun (South Korea) H-C Lim	6^{3}	3
(Japan) T Ito (Japan) T Iwami	6	3	[3]
4	(Australia) S Kadir (India) P Raja	3	6	[10]
(Japan) Y Ito (Ukraine) D Molchanov	1	7	[7]
(United States) B Evans (Israel) N Okun	6	5	[10]
(Australia) A Feeney (Australia) S Groth	4	3
2	(Australia) R Junaid (Austria) A Peya	6	6

Quarterfinals
1	(Thailand) Sa Ratiwatana (Thailand) So Ratiwatana	2	6	[11]
(Slovakia) I Klec (Japan) J Mitsuhashi	6	0	[9]
3	(Canada) P-L Duclos (Chinese Taipei) T-h Yang	4	6	[10]
WC	(South Korea) S-Y Jeong (South Korea) JS Nam	6	1	[2]
WC	(South Korea) J-S An (South Korea) Y-K Lim	2	3
4	(Australia) S Kadir (India) P Raja	6	6
(United States) B Evans (Israel) N Okun	3	4
2	(Australia) R Junaid (Austria) A Peya	6	6

Semifinals
1	(Thailand) Sa Ratiwatana (Thailand) So Ratiwatana	2	6	[10]
3	(Canada) P-L Duclos (Chinese Taipei) T-h Yang	6	4	[12]
4	(Australia) S Kadir (India) P Raja	6	3	[5]
2	(Australia) R Junaid (Austria) A Peya	1	6	[10]

Finals
3	(Canada) P-L Duclos (Chinese Taipei) T-h Yang	4	5
2	(Australia) R Junaid (Austria) A Peya	6	7
