= 2012 Busan Open Challenger Tennis – Doubles =

Doubles
- 2012 Busan Open Challenger Tennis

Final
- Champions: (India) Yuki Bhambri (India) Divij Sharan
- Runners-up: (Chinese Taipei) Hsieh Cheng-peng (Chinese Taipei) Lee Hsin-han
- Score: 1–6, 6–1, [10–5]

Events
Singles	Doubles
← 2011 ·	Busan Open Challenger Tennis	· 2013 →

Im Kyu-tae and Danai Udomchoke were the defending champions but Im decided not to participate.
Udomchoke played alongside Daniel Garza, but they lost in the quarterfinals to Raven Klaasen and Izak van der Merwe.
Yuki Bhambri and Divij Sharan won the title defeating Hsieh Cheng-peng and Lee Hsin-han in the final 1–6, 6–1, [10–5].

== Seeds ==
1. (South Africa) Raven Klaasen / (South Africa) Izak van der Merwe (semifinals)
2. (Thailand) Sanchai Ratiwatana / (Thailand) Sonchat Ratiwatana (quarterfinals)
3. (Chinese Taipei) Hsieh Cheng-peng / (Chinese Taipei) Lee Hsin-han (final)
4. (United States) John Paul Fruttero / (Belarus) Uladzimir Ignatik (semifinals)

== Draw ==
=== Key ===
- Q = Qualifier
- WC = Wild card
- LL = Lucky loser
- Alt = Alternate
- SE = Special exempt
- PR = Protected ranking
- ITF = ITF entry
- JE = Junior exempt
- w/o = Walkover
- r = Retired
- d = Defaulted
- SR = Special ranking

=== Draw ===
First round
1	(South Africa) R Klaasen (South Africa) I van der Merwe	6	6
WC	(South Korea) Chung Hong (South Korea) S-y Jeong	4	1
(Australia) Nima Roshan (Chinese Taipei) J Wang	4	6	[8]
(Mexico) D Garza (Thailand) D Udomchoke	6	3	[10]
3	(Chinese Taipei) C-p Hsieh (Chinese Taipei) H-h Lee	6	6
(Australia) J Millman (Chinese Taipei) T-h Yang	2	4
(Japan) Hiroki Moriya (Israel) A Weintraub	4	6	[10]
WC	(South Korea) J-w Na (South Korea) J-m Seol	6	1	[4]
(Australia) S Groth (Australia) A Hubble	2	5
(South Africa) R de Voest (Denmark) F Nielsen	6	7
WC	(South Korea) H-w Nam (Japan) Bumpei Sato	4	6^{1}
4	(United States) JP Fruttero (Belarus) U Ignatik	6	7^{7}
(India) Y Bhambri (India) D Sharan	6	4	[10]
(Japan) T Ito (Japan) Yasutaka Uchiyama	4	6	[8]
Q	(Japan) Hiroyasu Ehara (Japan) Yuichi Ito	1	4
2	(Thailand) Sa Ratiwatana (Thailand) So Ratiwatana	6	6

Quarterfinals
1	(South Africa) R Klaasen (South Africa) I van der Merwe	4	6	[12]
(Mexico) D Garza (Thailand) D Udomchoke	6	3	[10]
3	(Chinese Taipei) C-p Hsieh (Chinese Taipei) H-h Lee	7^{7}	6
(Japan) Hiroki Moriya (Israel) A Weintraub	6^{4}	2
(South Africa) R de Voest (Denmark) F Nielsen	1	3
4	(United States) JP Fruttero (Belarus) U Ignatik	6	6
(India) Y Bhambri (India) D Sharan	3	6	[10]
2	(Thailand) Sa Ratiwatana (Thailand) So Ratiwatana	6	3	[3]

Semifinals
1	(South Africa) R Klaasen (South Africa) I van der Merwe	3	3
3	(Chinese Taipei) C-p Hsieh (Chinese Taipei) H-h Lee	6	6
4	(United States) JP Fruttero (Belarus) U Ignatik	5	5
(India) Y Bhambri (India) D Sharan	7	7

Final
3	(Chinese Taipei) C-p Hsieh (Chinese Taipei) H-h Lee	6	1	[5]
(India) Y Bhambri (India) D Sharan	1	6	[10]
