= 2019 Busan Open – Singles =

Singles
- 2019 Busan Open

Final
- Champion: (Lithuania) Ričardas Berankis
- Runner-up: (Australia) Andrew Harris
- Score: 7–6^{(7–5)}, 6–2

Events
Singles	Doubles
← 2018 ·	Busan Open	· 2022 →

Matthew Ebden was the defending champion but chose not to defend his title.

Ričardas Berankis won the title after defeating Andrew Harris 7–6^{(7–5)}, 6–2 in the final.

== Seeds ==
All seeds receive a bye into the second round.

1. (Lithuania) Ričardas Berankis (champion)
2. (Ukraine) Sergiy Stakhovsky (second round)
3. (Canada) Brayden Schnur (second round)
4. (Slovakia) Lukáš Lacko (third round)
5. (Chinese Taipei) Jason Jung (second round)
6. (Cyprus) Marcos Baghdatis (third round)
7. (Russia) Evgeny Donskoy (quarterfinals)
8. (India) Ramkumar Ramanathan (second round)
9. (Serbia) Nikola Milojević (second round)
10. (Japan) Tatsuma Ito (quarterfinals)
11. (South Korea) Kwon Soon-woo (second round)
12. (Belgium) Ruben Bemelmans (second round)
13. (Japan) Yūichi Sugita (second round)
14. (Japan) Hiroki Moriya (second round)
15. (Japan) Go Soeda (quarterfinals)
16. (Japan) Yasutaka Uchiyama (semifinals)

== Draw ==
=== Key ===
- Q = Qualifier
- WC = Wild card
- LL = Lucky loser
- Alt = Alternate
- SE = Special exempt
- PR = Protected ranking
- ITF = ITF entry
- JE = Junior exempt
- w/o = Walkover
- r = Retired
- d = Defaulted
- SR = Special ranking

=== Finals ===
Quarterfinals
1	(Lithuania) Ričardas Berankis	5	6	6
(South Korea) Chung Yun-seong	7	3	4
16	(Japan) Yasutaka Uchiyama	4	6	6
10	(Japan) Tatsuma Ito	6	0	3
7	(Russia) Evgeny Donskoy	4	6^{5}
(Australia) Andrew Harris	6	7^{7}
(Australia) Akira Santillan	6	6
15	(Japan) Go Soeda	3	3

Semifinals
1	(Lithuania) Ričardas Berankis	6	7
16	(Japan) Yasutaka Uchiyama	2	5
(Australia) Andrew Harris	5	7^{8}	2
(Australia) Akira Santillan	7	6^{6}	1^{r}

Final
1	(Lithuania) Ričardas Berankis	7^{7}	6
(Australia) Andrew Harris	6^{5}	2

=== Top half ===
==== Section 1 ====
First round
(United Kingdom) L Broady	7	6
Q	(China) Xia Zihao	5	1
Q	(Japan) Makoto Ochi	6^{3}	4
(South Korea) D-h Lee	7^{7}	6
(South Korea) Y-s Chung	3	6	6
(China) Z Li	6	3	4
(United States) Evan Song	6	3	3
(Israel) D Sela	3	6	6

Second round
1	(Lithuania) R Berankis	1	7^{9}	6
(United Kingdom) L Broady	6	6^{7}	4
(South Korea) D-h Lee	5	6	7^{7}
13	(Japan) Y Sugita	7	3	6^{3}
9	(Serbia) N Milojević	2	6	5
(South Korea) Y-s Chung	6	3	7
(Israel) D Sela	6	2	2
6	(Cyprus) M Baghdatis	4	6	6

Third round
1	(Lithuania) R Berankis	6	3	6
(South Korea) D-h Lee	3	6	3
(South Korea) Y-s Chung	6	6
6	(Cyprus) M Baghdatis	2	3

Quarterfinals
1	(Lithuania) R Berankis	5	6	6
(South Korea) Y-s Chung	7	3	4

==== Section 2 ====
First round
WC	(South Korea) Kim Young-seok	1	0
(Australia) L Saville	6	6
(Australia) M Banes	6	7^{10}
WC	(South Korea) Kim Cheong-eui	1	6^{8}
(Chinese Taipei) T-l Wu	7^{7}	7
(Austria) M Neuchrist	6^{2}	5
(Turkey) C İlkel	6	7^{7}
WC	(South Korea) J-s Nam	4	6^{2}

Second round
4	(Slovakia) L Lacko	3	6	6
(Australia) L Saville	6	3	4
(Australia) M Banes	4	2
16	(Japan) Y Uchiyama	6	6
10	(Japan) T Ito	6	7^{7}
(Chinese Taipei) T-l Wu	4	6^{2}
(Turkey) C İlkel	6	7^{7}
8	(India) R Ramanathan	1	6^{0}

Third round
4	(Slovakia) L Lacko	6	4	0
16	(Japan) Y Uchiyama	3	6	6
10	(Japan) T Ito	7	6^{6}	6
(Turkey) C İlkel	5	7^{8}	4

Quarterfinals
16	(Japan) Y Uchiyama	4	6	6
10	(Japan) T Ito	6	0	3

=== Bottom half ===
==== Section 3 ====
First round
(India) S Mukund	7^{9}	3	7
(India) S Myneni	6^{7}	6	5
WC	(South Korea) M-k Song	6	3	2
(United States) E King	3	6	6
(France) S Robert	4	2
(Australia) A Harris	6	6
(Australia) M Purcell	6	6
(Canada) F Peliwo	4	3

Second round
7	(Russia) E Donskoy	6	6
(India) S Mukund	2	1
(United States) E King	6^{4}	7	7^{10}
12	(Belgium) R Bemelmans	7^{7}	5	6^{8}
14	(Japan) H Moriya	5	3
(Australia) A Harris	7	6
(Australia) M Purcell	6	6
3	(Canada) B Schnur	4	3

Third round
7	(Russia) E Donskoy	6	7^{7}
(United States) E King	2	6^{3}
(Australia) A Harris	6	4	6
(Australia) M Purcell	4	6	2

Quarterfinals
7	(Russia) E Donskoy	4	6^{5}
(Australia) A Harris	6	7^{7}

==== Section 4 ====
First round
(Bosnia and Herzegovina) A Šetkić	2	2
(Australia) A Santillan	6	6
(Chinese Taipei) T-h Yang	6	6
(United States) K King	3	4
(China) D Wu	6	3	6
(United States) Roy Smith	3	6	1
WC	(South Korea) S-c Hong	2	5
(Japan) K Uchida	6	7

Second round
5	(Chinese Taipei) J Jung	3	6	2
(Australia) A Santillan	6	3	6
(Chinese Taipei) T-h Yang	6	7^{14}
11	(South Korea) S-w Kwon	3	6^{12}
15	(Japan) G Soeda	6	6
(China) D Wu	1	1
(Japan) K Uchida	7^{10}	6
2	(Ukraine) S Stakhovsky	6^{8}	3

Third round
(Australia) A Santillan	7^{11}	6
(Chinese Taipei) T-h Yang	6^{9}	1
15	(Japan) G Soeda	6	6
(Japan) K Uchida	4	3

Quarterfinals
(Australia) A Santillan	6	6
15	(Japan) G Soeda	3	3
