= 2010 Busan Open Challenger Tennis – Singles =

Singles
- 2010 Busan Open Challenger Tennis

Final
- Champion: (South Korea) Lim Yong-Kyu
- Runner-up: (Chinese Taipei) Lu Yen-hsun
- Score: 6–1, 6–4

Events
Singles	Doubles
← 2009 ·	Busan Open Challenger Tennis	· 2011 →

Danai Udomchoke was the defending champion, but he chose not to compete this year.
Lim Yong-Kyu won in the final 6–1, 6–4 against Lu Yen-hsun.

== Seeds ==
1. (Germany) Rainer Schüttler (first round)
2. (Chinese Taipei) Lu Yen-hsun (final)
3. (Japan) Go Soeda (semifinals)
4. (Austria) Alexander Peya (second round)
5. (United States) Brendan Evans (first round)
6. (Portugal) ~~Leonardo Tavares~~ (withdrew)
7. (Germany) Simon Stadler (first round)
8. (Japan) Tatsuma Ito (quarterfinals)

== Draw ==
=== Key ===
- Q = Qualifier
- WC = Wild card
- LL = Lucky loser
- Alt = Alternate
- SE = Special exempt
- PR = Protected ranking
- ITF = ITF entry
- JE = Junior exempt
- w/o = Walkover
- r = Retired
- d = Defaulted
- SR = Special ranking

=== Finals ===
Semifinals
WC	(South Korea) Lim Yong-Kyu	6	6
WC	(South Korea) Jun Woong-Sun	3	4
3	(Japan) Go Soeda	4	0
2	(Chinese Taipei) Lu Yen-hsun	6	6

Final
WC	(South Korea) Lim Yong-Kyu	6	6
2	(Chinese Taipei) Lu Yen-hsun	1	4

=== Top half ===
First round
1	(Germany) R Schüttler	4	2
(South Korea) Y-J Kim	6	6
Q	(Japan) T Matsui	3	6^{7}
(Canada) P-L Duclos	6	7
(Israel) N Okun	1	2
WC	(South Korea) Y-K Lim	6	6
(Japan) T Suzuki	6	6
7	(Germany) S Stadler	4	4
4	(Austria) A Peya	3	6	6
Q	(South Korea) J-S An	6	1	4
(Japan) Y Ito	6	4	3
WC	(South Korea) W-S Jun	2	6	6
(India) V Vardhan	6	6
WC	(South Korea) JS Nam	3	2
(Australia) R Junaid	6	6
Q	(Germany) S Rieschick	4	4

Second round
(South Korea) Y-J Kim	2	4
(Canada) P-L Duclos	6	6
WC	(South Korea) Y-K Lim	6	6
(Japan) T Suzuki	1	3
4	(Austria) A Peya	6	1	1
WC	(South Korea) W-S Jun	4	6	6
(India) V Vardhan	3	6^{4}
(Australia) R Junaid	6	7

Quarterfinals
(Canada) P-L Duclos	4	2
WC	(South Korea) Y-K Lim	6	6
WC	(South Korea) W-S Jun	3	6	7
(Australia) R Junaid	6	2	6^{5}

Semifinals
WC	(South Korea) Y-K Lim	6	6
WC	(South Korea) W-S Jun	3	4

=== Bottom half ===
First round
8	(Japan) T Ito	6	2	6
(Canada) M Raonic	4	6	4
(Australia) S Groth	4	4
WC	(South Korea) S-Y Jeong	6	6
(Australia) S Kadir	6^{5}	1
Q	(Chinese Taipei) T Chen	7	6
(Chinese Taipei) T-H Yang	2	0
3	(Japan) G Soeda	6	6
5	(United States) B Evans	4	3
LL	(Japan) H Kondo	6	6
(Latvia) A Juška	6	6
(Slovakia) I Klec	4	4
(Russia) A Sitak	3	6	6^{8}
(Slovakia) A Martin	6	3	7
(Australia) A Feeney	6	2	6^{4}
2	(Chinese Taipei) Y-h Lu	3	6	7

Second round
8	(Japan) T Ito	7	3	6
WC	(South Korea) S-Y Jeong	6^{5}	6	3
Q	(Chinese Taipei) T Chen	5	5
3	(Japan) G Soeda	7	7
LL	(Japan) H Kondo	3	6	6
(Latvia) A Juška	6	4	4
(Slovakia) A Martin	1	3
2	(Chinese Taipei) Y-h Lu	6	6

Quarterfinals
8	(Japan) T Ito	2	6^{8}
3	(Japan) G Soeda	6	7
LL	(Japan) H Kondo	1	6	2
2	(Chinese Taipei) Y-h Lu	6	2	6

Semifinals
3	(Japan) G Soeda	4	0
2	(Chinese Taipei) Y-h Lu	6	6
