= 2014 Busan Open Challenger Tour – Doubles =

Doubles
- 2014 Busan Open Challenger Tour

Final
- Champion: (Thailand) Sanchai Ratiwatana (Thailand) Sonchat Ratiwatana
- Runner-up: (United Kingdom) Jamie Delgado (Australia) John-Patrick Smith
- Score: 6–4, 6–4

Events
Singles	Doubles
← 2013 ·	Busan Open Challenger Tour	· 2015 →

Peng Hsien-yin and Yang Tsung-hua were the defending champions, but decided not to compete.

Sanchai and Sonchat Ratiwatana won the title, defeating Jamie Delgado and John-Patrick Smith in the final, 6–4, 6–4.

== Seeds ==
1. (Thailand) Sanchai Ratiwatana / (Thailand) Sonchat Ratiwatana (champions)
2. (Australia) Alex Bolt / (Australia) Andrew Whittington (quarterfinals)
3. (United Kingdom) Jamie Delgado / (Australia) John-Patrick Smith (final)
4. (Russia) Victor Baluda / (Russia) Konstantin Kravchuk (quarterfinals)

== Draw ==
=== Key ===
- Q = Qualifier
- WC = Wild card
- LL = Lucky loser
- Alt = Alternate
- SE = Special exempt
- PR = Protected ranking
- ITF = ITF entry
- JE = Junior exempt
- w/o = Walkover
- r = Retired
- d = Defaulted
- SR = Special ranking

=== Draw ===
First round
1	(Thailand) Sa Ratiwatana (Thailand) So Ratiwatana	7	6
WC	(South Korea) J-s Nam (South Korea) Noh Sang-woo	5	1
(Chinese Taipei) T Chen (Austria) M Neuchrist	3	6^{2}
(Russia) A Kudryavtsev (Israel) A Weintraub	6	7^{7}
4	(Russia) V Baluda (Russia) K Kravchuk	7^{7}	6
Q	(South Korea) W-s Jun (South Korea) J-w Na	6^{4}	1
WC	(South Korea) H Chung (South Korea) Y-k Lim	6	4	[10]
(Japan) T Matsui (Thailand) D Udomchoke	2	6	[6]
(United Kingdom) E Corrie (United Kingdom) D Smethurst	6^{3}	2
(Chinese Taipei) H-h Lee (Chinese Taipei) J Wang	7^{7}	6
(Australia) D Propoggia (Australia) M Reid	3	2
3	(United Kingdom) J Delgado (Australia) J-P Smith	6	6
WC	(China) M Gong (Chinese Taipei) H-y Peng	6	6
(Japan) G Soeda (Chinese Taipei) T-h Yang	2	2
(Slovakia) K Beck (Slovakia) L Lacko	6^{3}	3
2	(Australia) A Bolt (Australia) A Whittington	7^{7}	6

Quarterfinals
1	(Thailand) Sa Ratiwatana (Thailand) So Ratiwatana	6	7
(Russia) A Kudryavtsev (Israel) A Weintraub	2	5
4	(Russia) V Baluda (Russia) K Kravchuk	6	3	[6]
WC	(South Korea) H Chung (South Korea) Y-k Lim	2	6	[10]
(Chinese Taipei) H-h Lee (Chinese Taipei) J Wang	3	6	[7]
3	(United Kingdom) J Delgado (Australia) J-P Smith	6	2	[10]
WC	(China) M Gong (Chinese Taipei) H-y Peng	6	6
2	(Australia) A Bolt (Australia) A Whittington	1	3

Semifinals
1	(Thailand) Sa Ratiwatana (Thailand) So Ratiwatana	7^{7}	6
WC	(South Korea) H Chung (South Korea) Y-k Lim	6^{3}	4
3	(United Kingdom) J Delgado (Australia) J-P Smith	6	3	[10]
WC	(China) M Gong (Chinese Taipei) H-y Peng	2	6	[6]

Final
1	(Thailand) Sa Ratiwatana (Thailand) So Ratiwatana	6	6
3	(United Kingdom) J Delgado (Australia) J-P Smith	4	4
