= 2018 Busan Open =

- Date: 14–20 May
- Edition: 17th
- Draw: 32S / 16D
- Surface: Hard
- Location: Busan, South Korea

Champions

Singles
- (Australia) Matthew Ebden

Doubles
- (Chinese Taipei) Hsieh Cheng-peng / (Indonesia) Christopher Rungkat
← 2017 ·	Busan Open	· 2019 →

The 2018 Busan Open was a professional tennis tournament played on hardcourts. It was the seventeenth edition of the tournament which was part of the 2018 ATP Challenger Tour. It took place in Busan, South Korea between 14 and 20 May 2018.

== Singles main-draw entrants ==
=== Seeds ===
Country	Player	Rank^{1}	Seed
AUS	Matthew Ebden	83	1
IND	Yuki Bhambri	86	2
CAN	Vasek Pospisil	88	3
ISR	Dudi Sela	97	4
TPE	Lu Yen-hsun	111	5
USA	Mackenzie McDonald	114	6
JPN	Go Soeda	149	7
TPE	Jason Jung	154	8

* ^{1} Rankings as of May 7, 2018.

=== Other entrants ===
The following players received wildcards into the singles main draw:

- (South Korea) Hong Seong-chan
- (South Korea) Kim Young-seok
- (South Korea) Na Jung-woong
- (South Korea) Oh Chan-yeong

The following player received entry into the singles main draw as a special exempt:

- (Japan) Yoshihito Nishioka

The following players received entry from the qualifying draw:

- (Australia) Maverick Banes
- (South Korea) Chung Yun-seong
- (New Zealand) Rubin Statham
- (Japan) Yosuke Watanuki

== Champions ==
=== Singles ===
- (Australia) Matthew Ebden def. (Canada) Vasek Pospisil 7–6^{(7–4)}, 6–1.

=== Doubles ===
- (Chinese Taipei) Hsieh Cheng-peng / (Indonesia) Christopher Rungkat def. (South Africa) Ruan Roelofse / (Australia) John-Patrick Smith 6–4, 6–3.
