= 2018 Busan Open – Doubles =

Doubles
- 2018 Busan Open

Final
- Champions: (Chinese Taipei) Hsieh Cheng-peng (Indonesia) Christopher Rungkat
- Runners-up: (South Africa) Ruan Roelofse (Australia) John-Patrick Smith
- Score: 6–4, 6–3

Events
Singles	Doubles
← 2017 ·	Busan Open	· 2019 →

Hsieh Cheng-peng and Peng Hsien-yin were the defending champions but chose to defend their title with different partners. Hsieh partnered Christopher Rungkat and successfully defended his title. Peng partnered Aliaksandr Bury but lost in the semifinals to Hsieh and Rungkat.

Hsieh and Rungkat won the title after defeating Ruan Roelofse and John-Patrick Smith 6–4, 6–3 in the final.

== Seeds ==
1. (South Africa) Ruan Roelofse / (Australia) John-Patrick Smith (final)
2. (Belarus) Aliaksandr Bury / (Chinese Taipei) Peng Hsien-yin (semifinals)
3. (Thailand) Sanchai Ratiwatana / (Thailand) Sonchat Ratiwatana (semifinals)
4. (Chinese Taipei) Hsieh Cheng-peng / (Indonesia) Christopher Rungkat (champions)

== Draw ==
=== Key ===
- Q = Qualifier
- WC = Wild card
- LL = Lucky loser
- Alt = Alternate
- SE = Special exempt
- PR = Protected ranking
- ITF = ITF entry
- JE = Junior exempt
- w/o = Walkover
- r = Retired
- d = Defaulted
- SR = Special ranking

First round
1	(South Africa) R Roelofse (Australia) J-P Smith	6	6
WC	(South Korea) Kim Yu-seob (South Korea) Lim Hyung-chan	4	4
(China) Z Li (China) D Wu	5	6	[13]
(China) M Gong (China) Ze Zhang	7	4	[15]
3	(Thailand) Sa Ratiwatana (Thailand) So Ratiwatana	6	6
(Japan) T Matsui (New Zealand) R Statham	1	2
(Japan) Y Takahashi (Japan) K Uchida	3	6	[8]
(Philippines) R Gonzales (Canada) B Schnur	6	3	[10]
(United States) M McDonald (Canada) F Peliwo	0	6	[13]
Q	(Australia) M Banes (Australia) B Ellis	6	4	[15]
WC	(South Korea) Ho Chung (South Korea) J-m Lee	6^{4}	1
4	(Chinese Taipei) C-p Hsieh (Indonesia) C Rungkat	7^{7}	6
(Australia) J Kubler (Australia) M Purcell	6	6^{4}	[10]
WC	(South Korea) Y-s Chung (South Korea) S-c Hong	4	7^{7}	[8]
(Chinese Taipei) T Chen (Chinese Taipei) C-h Yi	6	4	[7]
2	(Belarus) A Bury (Chinese Taipei) H-y Peng	3	6	[10]

Quarterfinals
1	(South Africa) R Roelofse (Australia) J-P Smith	3	6	[16]
(China) M Gong (China) Ze Zhang	6	1	[14]
3	(Thailand) Sa Ratiwatana (Thailand) So Ratiwatana	6	6
(Philippines) R Gonzales (Canada) B Schnur	2	4
Q	(Australia) M Banes (Australia) B Ellis	4	3
4	(Chinese Taipei) C-p Hsieh (Indonesia) C Rungkat	6	6
(Australia) J Kubler (Australia) M Purcell
2	(Belarus) A Bury (Chinese Taipei) H-y Peng	w/o

Semifinals
1	(South Africa) R Roelofse (Australia) J-P Smith	6	6
3	(Thailand) Sa Ratiwatana (Thailand) So Ratiwatana	4	4
4	(Chinese Taipei) C-p Hsieh (Indonesia) C Rungkat	6	4	[10]
2	(Belarus) A Bury (Chinese Taipei) H-y Peng	4	6	[6]

Final
1	(South Africa) R Roelofse (Australia) J-P Smith	4	3
4	(Chinese Taipei) C-p Hsieh (Indonesia) C Rungkat	6	6
