= 2015 Busan Open – Singles =

Singles
- 2015 Busan Open

Final
- Champion: (South Korea) Chung Hyeon
- Runner-up: (Slovakia) Lukáš Lacko
- Score: 6–3, 6–1

Events
Singles	Doubles
← 2014 ·	Busan Open	· 2016 →

Go Soeda was the defending champion, but lost in the quarterfinals.

Chung Hyeon won the title, defeating Lukáš Lacko in the final 6–3, 6–1.

== Seeds ==
1. (Chinese Taipei) Lu Yen-hsun (second round)
2. (Australia) Sam Groth (second round)
3. (Japan) Go Soeda (quarterfinals)
4. (South Korea) Chung Hyeon (champion)
5. (Israel) Dudi Sela (first round)
6. (Japan) Tatsuma Ito (second round)
7. (Slovakia) Lukáš Lacko (final)
8. (United States) Ryan Harrison (withdrew)

== Draw ==
=== Key ===
- Q = Qualifier
- WC = Wild card
- LL = Lucky loser
- Alt = Alternate
- SE = Special exempt
- PR = Protected ranking
- ITF = ITF entry
- JE = Junior exempt
- w/o = Walkover
- r = Retired
- d = Defaulted
- SR = Special ranking

=== Finals ===
Semifinals
SE	(Slovenia) Grega Žemlja	3	4
4	(South Korea) Chung Hyeon	6	6
(China) Zhang Ze	2	1
7	(Slovakia) Lukáš Lacko	6	6

Final
4	(South Korea) Chung Hyeon	6	6
7	(Slovakia) Lukáš Lacko	3	1

=== Top half ===
First round
1	(Chinese Taipei) Y-h Lu	6	6
WC	(South Korea) Hong Seong-chan	3	4
SE	(Slovenia) G Žemlja	6	2	6
(Chinese Taipei) J Wang	2	6	2
(South Korea) Nam Ji-sung	6	6
(Japan) T Niki	1	4
(United States) D Nguyen	6	1
5	(Israel) D Sela	1	0^{r}
4	(South Korea) H Chung	6	6
(United States) J Jenkins	0	3
(United States) D Kudla	6	6
WC	(South Korea) Y-k Lim	0	4
Q	(Denmark) F Nielsen	6	7^{7}
Q	(South Korea) Kim Young-seok	4	6^{4}
(Russia) A Kudryavtsev	3	3
6	(Japan) T Ito	6	6

Second round
1	(Chinese Taipei) Y-h Lu	1	5
SE	(Slovenia) G Žemlja	6	7
(South Korea) J-s Nam	6	3	6
(United States) D Nguyen	4	6	3
4	(South Korea) H Chung	7^{7}	7^{7}
(United States) D Kudla	6^{3}	6^{5}
Q	(Denmark) F Nielsen	6	7^{7}
6	(Japan) T Ito	3	6^{4}

Quarterfinals
SE	(Slovenia) G Žemlja	6	6
(South Korea) J-s Nam	3	3
4	(South Korea) H Chung	6	6
Q	(Denmark) F Nielsen	0	1

Semifinals
SE	(Slovenia) G Žemlja	3	4
4	(South Korea) H Chung	6	6

=== Bottom half ===
First round
Q	(United States) J Jung	5	4
Q	(Bulgaria) D Kutrovsky	7	6
(China) Z Zhang	6	6
(Australia) J Thompson	2	1
(Australia) J-P Smith	6	6
(South Korea) Oh Chan-yeong	0	1
LL	(Australia) M Barton	2	4
3	(Japan) G Soeda	6	6
7	(Slovakia) L Lacko	6	4	6
(Australia) L Saville	1	6	3
(United Kingdom) E Corrie	7^{7}	3	5
(Ukraine) I Marchenko	6^{5}	6	7
(Japan) H Moriya	4	1
SE	(Croatia) F Škugor	6	6
(Australia) A Bolt	4	5
2	(Australia) S Groth	6	7

Second round
Q	(Bulgaria) D Kutrovsky	6	3	3
(China) Z Zhang	3	6	6
(Australia) J-P Smith	6^{4}	3
3	(Japan) G Soeda	7^{7}	6
7	(Slovakia) L Lacko	6	3	6
(Ukraine) I Marchenko	1	6	3
SE	(Croatia) F Škugor	7^{7}	4	6
2	(Australia) S Groth	6^{4}	6	1

Quarterfinals
(China) Z Zhang	6	6
3	(Japan) G Soeda	2	2
7	(Slovakia) L Lacko	6	6
SE	(Croatia) F Škugor	4	1

Semifinals
(China) Z Zhang	2	1
7	(Slovakia) L Lacko	6	6
