= 2012 Busan Open Challenger Tennis =

- Date: 7–13 May
- Edition: 10th
- Surface: Hard
- Location: Busan, South Korea

Champions

Singles
- (Japan) Tatsuma Ito

Doubles
- (India) Yuki Bhambri / (India) Divij Sharan
← 2011 ·	Busan Open Challenger Tennis	· 2013 →

The 2012 Busan Open Challenger Tennis was a professional tennis tournament played on hard courts. It was the tenth edition of the tournament which was part of the 2012 ATP Challenger Tour. It took place in Busan, South Korea between 7 and 13 May 2012.

== Singles main-draw entrants ==
=== Seeds ===
Country	Player	Rank^{1}	Seed
TPE	Yen-Hsun Lu	57	1
JPN	Tatsuma Ito	80	2
SUI	Marco Chiudinelli	135	3
RSA	Rik de Voest	139	4
RSA	Izak van der Merwe	158	5
THA	Danai Udomchoke	173	6
TPE	Yang Tsung-hua	175	7
ISR	Amir Weintraub	186	8

- ^{1} Rankings are as of April 30, 2012.

=== Other entrants ===
The following players received wildcards into the singles main draw:

- (South Korea) Chung Hong
- (South Korea) Jeong Suk-young
- (South Korea) Na Jung-Woong
- (South Korea) Nam Ji-sung

The following players received entry from the qualifying draw:

- (South Korea) Kim Cheong-eui
- (United States) Michael McClune
- (Indonesia) Christopher Rungkat
- (Japan) Kento Takeuchi

== Champions ==
=== Singles ===
- (Japan) Tatsuma Ito def. (Australia) John Millman, 6–4, 6–3

=== Doubles ===
- (India) Yuki Bhambri / (India) Divij Sharan def. (Chinese Taipei) Hsieh Cheng-peng / (Chinese Taipei) Lee Hsin-han, 1–6, 6–1, [10–5]
