= 2015 Busan Open – Doubles =

Doubles
- 2015 Busan Open

Final
- Champion: (Thailand) Sanchai Ratiwatana (Thailand) Sonchat Ratiwatana
- Runner-up: (South Korea) Nam Ji-sung (South Korea) Song Min-kyu
- Score: 7–6^{(7–2)}, 3–6, [10–7]

Events
Singles	Doubles
← 2014 ·	Busan Open	· 2016 →

Sanchai Ratiwatana and Sonchat Ratiwatana were the defending champions and successfully defended their title, defeating Nam Ji-sung and Song Min-kyu in the final, 7–6^{(7–2)}, 3–6, [10–7].

== Seeds ==
1. (China) Gong Maoxin / (Chinese Taipei) Peng Hsien-yin (first round)
2. (United States) James Cerretani / (Australia) Andrew Whittington (semifinals)
3. (Australia) John-Patrick Smith / (Australia) Jordan Thompson (quarterfinals)
4. (Thailand) Sanchai Ratiwatana / (Thailand) Sonchat Ratiwatana (champions)

== Draw ==
=== Key ===
- Q = Qualifier
- WC = Wild card
- LL = Lucky loser
- Alt = Alternate
- SE = Special exempt
- PR = Protected ranking
- ITF = ITF entry
- JE = Junior exempt
- w/o = Walkover
- r = Retired
- d = Defaulted
- SR = Special ranking

First round
1	(China) M Gong (Chinese Taipei) H-y Peng	6	4	[7]
(Bulgaria) D Kutrovsky (Croatia) F Škugor	1	6	[10]
(Chinese Taipei) H-h Lee (Australia) L Saville	0	4
WC	(South Korea) H Chung (South Korea) Y-k Lim	6	6
4	(Thailand) Sa Ratiwatana (Thailand) So Ratiwatana	6	6
(Republic of Ireland) J Cluskey (Republic of Ireland) D O'Hare	2	0
(United States) J Jung (United States) D Nguyen	6^{4}	6	[10]
(Japan) T Matsui (China) Z Zhang	7^{7}	2	[7]
WC	(South Korea) J-s Nam (South Korea) M-k Song	4
(Russia) A Kudryavtsev (Ukraine) I Marchenko	0^{r}
(United Kingdom) E Corrie (Denmark) F Nielsen	5	2
3	(Australia) J-P Smith (Australia) J Thompson	7	6
WC	(South Korea) Y-s Chung (South Korea) S-c Hong	2	5
(United States) J Jenkins (United States) D Kudla	6	7
(Slovakia) L Lacko (Chinese Taipei) J Wang	2	5
2	(United States) J Cerretani (Australia) A Whittington	6	7

Quarterfinals
(Bulgaria) D Kutrovsky (Croatia) F Škugor	4	1
WC	(South Korea) H Chung (South Korea) Y-k Lim	6	6
4	(Thailand) Sa Ratiwatana (Thailand) So Ratiwatana	6	6
(United States) J Jung (United States) D Nguyen	2	3
WC	(South Korea) J-s Nam (South Korea) M-k Song	5	6	[10]
3	(Australia) J-P Smith (Australia) J Thompson	7	4	[5]
(United States) J Jenkins (United States) D Kudla	3	7^{8}	[7]
2	(United States) J Cerretani (Australia) A Whittington	6	6^{6}	[10]

Semifinals
WC	(South Korea) H Chung (South Korea) Y-k Lim	0^{r}
4	(Thailand) Sa Ratiwatana (Thailand) So Ratiwatana	1
WC	(South Korea) J-s Nam (South Korea) M-k Song	6	7
2	(United States) J Cerretani (Australia) A Whittington	4	5

Final
4	(Thailand) Sa Ratiwatana (Thailand) So Ratiwatana	7^{7}	3	[10]
WC	(South Korea) J-s Nam (South Korea) M-k Song	6^{2}	6	[7]
