= 2010 Busan Open Challenger Tennis =

Tennis tournament

- Date: May 10 – May 16
- Edition: 8th
- Location: Busan, South Korea

Champions

Singles
- (South Korea) Lim Yong-Kyu

Doubles
- (Australia) Rameez Junaid / (Austria) Alexander Peya
← 2009 ·	Busan Open Challenger Tennis	· 2011 →

The 2010 Busan Open Challenger Tennis was a professional tennis tournament played on outdoor hard courts. It was part of the 2010 ATP Challenger Tour. It took place in Busan, South Korea between May 10 and May 16, 2010.

== ATP entrants ==
=== Seeds ===
Nationality	Player	Ranking*	Seeding
GER	Rainer Schüttler	75	1
TPE	Lu Yen-hsun	78	2
JPN	Go Soeda	155	3
AUT	Alexander Peya	225	4
USA	Brendan Evans	236	5
POR	~~Leonardo Tavares~~	~~249~~	~~6~~
GER	Simon Stadler	269	7
JPN	Tatsuma Ito	272	8

- Rankings are as of May 3, 2010.

=== Other entrants ===
The following players received wildcards into the singles main draw:

- (South Korea) Lim Yong-Kyu
- (South Korea) Jun Woong-Sun
- (South Korea) Nam Ji Sung
- (South Korea) Jeong Suk-Young

The following players received entry from the qualifying draw:

- (South Korea) An Jae-Sung
- (Chinese Taipei) Chen Ti
- (Japan) Hiroki Kondo (as a Lucky loser)
- (Japan) Toshihide Matsui
- (Germany) Sebastian Rieschick

== Champions ==
=== Singles ===
(South Korea) Lim Yong-Kyu def. (Chinese Taipei) Lu Yen-hsun, 6–1, 6–4

=== Doubles ===
(Austria) Alexander Peya / (Australia) Rameez Junaid def. (Canada) Pierre-Ludovic Duclos / (Chinese Taipei) Yang Tsung-hua, 6–4, 7–5
