= 2024 Busan Open – Doubles =

Doubles
- 2024 Busan Open

Final
- Champions: (Chinese Taipei) Ray Ho (South Korea) Nam Ji-sung
- Runners-up: (South Korea) Chung Yun-seong (Chinese Taipei) Hsu Yu-hsiou
- Score: 6–2, 6–4

Events
Singles	Doubles
← 2023 ·	Busan Open	· 2025 →

Evan King and Reese Stalder were the defending champions but chose not to defend their title.

Ray Ho and Nam Ji-sung won the title after defeating Chung Yun-seong and Hsu Yu-hsiou 6–2, 6–4 in the final.

== Seeds ==
1. (India) Saketh Myneni / (Finland) Patrik Niklas-Salminen (first round)
2. (Japan) Toshihide Matsui / (Japan) Kaito Uesugi (semifinals)
3. (Chinese Taipei) Ray Ho / (South Korea) Nam Ji-sung (champions)
4. (Philippines) Francis Alcantara / (China) Sun Fajing (first round)

== Draw ==
=== Key ===
- Q = Qualifier
- WC = Wild card
- LL = Lucky loser
- Alt = Alternate
- SE = Special exempt
- PR = Protected ranking
- ITF = ITF entry
- JE = Junior exempt
- w/o = Walkover
- r = Retired
- d = Defaulted
- SR = Special ranking

=== Draw ===
First round
1	(India) S Myneni (Finland) P Niklas-Salminen	5	2
(Australia) A Bolt (Australia) L Tu	7	6
(Australia) B Ellis (Australia) D Sweeny	6	6
Alt	E Gerasimov; Mikalai Haliak	2	3
3	(Chinese Taipei) R Ho (South Korea) J-s Nam	6	6
(Japan) R Noguchi (Greece) S Sakellaridis	4	2
(France) A Escoffier (Chinese Taipei) T-l Wu	6	6
WC	(South Korea) J-m Lee (South Korea) M-k Song	4	3
(Estonia) M Lajal (France) Jules Marie	2	1
(South Korea) Y-s Chung (Chinese Taipei) Y-h Hsu	6	6
(Lithuania) R Berankis (Ukraine) I Marchenko	6	6^{4}	[12]
4	(Philippines) FC Alcantara (China) F Sun	4	7^{7}	[10]
(Italy) M Bellucci (Tunisia) M Echargui	6	2	[6]
(Japan) S Shimabukuro (Japan) Y Uchiyama	3	6	[10]
WC	(South Korea) S-c Hong (South Korea) S-w Kwon	5	3
2	(Japan) T Matsui (Japan) K Uesugi	7	6

Quarterfinals
(Australia) A Bolt (Australia) L Tu	7	6
(Australia) B Ellis (Australia) D Sweeny	5	2
3	(Chinese Taipei) R Ho (South Korea) J-s Nam	6	6
(France) A Escoffier (Chinese Taipei) T-l Wu	4	1
(South Korea) Y-s Chung (Chinese Taipei) Y-h Hsu	6	6
(Lithuania) R Berankis (Ukraine) I Marchenko	3	2
(Japan) S Shimabukuro (Japan) Y Uchiyama
2	(Japan) T Matsui (Japan) K Uesugi	w/o

Semifinals
(Australia) A Bolt (Australia) L Tu	3	4
3	(Chinese Taipei) R Ho (South Korea) J-s Nam	6	6
(South Korea) Y-s Chung (Chinese Taipei) Y-h Hsu	4	6	[10]
2	(Japan) T Matsui (Japan) K Uesugi	6	4	[4]

Final
3	(Chinese Taipei) R Ho (South Korea) J-s Nam	6	6
(South Korea) Y-s Chung (Chinese Taipei) Y-h Hsu	2	4
