= 2014 Busan Open Challenger Tour – Singles =

Singles
- 2014 Busan Open Challenger Tour

Final
- Champion: (Japan) Go Soeda
- Runner-up: (Chinese Taipei) Jimmy Wang
- Score: 6–3, 7–6^{(7–5)}

Events
Singles	Doubles
← 2013 ·	Busan Open Challenger Tour	· 2015 →

Dudi Sela was the defending champion, but chose not to compete.

Go Soeda won the title, defeating Jimmy Wang in the final, 6–3, 7–6^{(7–5)}.

== Seeds ==
1. (Slovakia) Lukáš Lacko (first round, retired)
2. (Japan) Go Soeda (champion)
3. (Luxembourg) Gilles Müller (withdrew because of fatigue)
4. (United States) Rajeev Ram (first round, retired)
5. (Australia) Samuel Groth (first round, retired because of a groin injury)
6. (Japan) Tatsuma Ito (first round, retired)
7. (Japan) Yūichi Sugita (withdrew because of an ankle injury)
8. (Chinese Taipei) Jimmy Wang (final)
9. (Australia) John-Patrick Smith (first round)

== Draw ==
=== Key ===
- Q = Qualifier
- WC = Wild card
- LL = Lucky loser
- Alt = Alternate
- SE = Special exempt
- PR = Protected ranking
- ITF = ITF entry
- JE = Junior exempt
- w/o = Walkover
- r = Retired
- d = Defaulted
- SR = Special ranking

=== Finals ===
Semifinals
8	(Chinese Taipei) Jimmy Wang	4	6	6
WC	(South Korea) Chung Hyeon	6	4	0
(Switzerland) Marco Chiudinelli	4	6^{6}
2	(Japan) Go Soeda	6	7^{8}

Final
8	(Chinese Taipei) Jimmy Wang	3	6^{5}
2	(Japan) Go Soeda	6	7^{7}

=== Top half ===
First round
1	(Slovakia) L Lacko	6	6^{4}	1^{r}
Q	(United States) J Jung	3	7^{7}	5
PR	(Australia) J Millman	2	4
(United States) A Krajicek	6	6
Q	(South Africa) F Wolmarans	4	6	3
(United States) C Buchanan	6	1	6
WC	(South Korea) Kim Cheong-eui	3	0
8	(Chinese Taipei) J Wang	6	6
4	(United States) R Ram	1^{r}
(Japan) Y Uchiyama	4
LL	(Austria) M Neuchrist	6^{4}	7	1
WC	(South Korea) H Chung	7^{7}	5	6
LL	(Slovakia) K Beck	2	0
(United Kingdom) D Smethurst	6	6
(Israel) A Weintraub	6	6
9	(Australia) J-P Smith	1	2

Second round
Q	(United States) J Jung	3	3
(United States) A Krajicek	6	6
(United States) C Buchanan	1	1
8	(Chinese Taipei) J Wang	6	6
(Japan) Y Uchiyama	1	4
WC	(South Korea) H Chung	6	6
(United Kingdom) D Smethurst	3	4
(Israel) A Weintraub	6	6

Quarterfinals
(United States) A Krajicek	5	4
8	(Chinese Taipei) J Wang	7	6
WC	(South Korea) H Chung	7	7
(Israel) A Weintraub	5	5

Semifinals
8	(Chinese Taipei) J Wang	4	6	6
WC	(South Korea) H Chung	6	4	0

=== Bottom half ===
First round
5	(Australia) S Groth	2^{r}
(Australia) B Mitchell	5
(Switzerland) M Chiudinelli	7^{7}	6
(Chinese Taipei) T Chen	6^{5}	3
(Russia) A Kudryavtsev	1	5
(Russia) K Kravchuk	6	7
(Australia) M Reid	6	2
Q	(Thailand) D Udomchoke	4	1^{r}
6	(Japan) T Ito	6^{4}	1^{r}
WC	(South Korea) J-s Nam	7^{7}	2
(Australia) L Saville	6	6
Q	(South Africa) R de Voest	3	2
(Chinese Taipei) T-h Yang	1	4
(Japan) Shuichi Sekiguchi	6	6
WC	(South Korea) D-h Lee	4	3
2	(Japan) G Soeda	6	6

Second round
(Australia) B Mitchell	4	1
(Switzerland) M Chiudinelli	6	6
(Russia) K Kravchuk	6	6
(Australia) M Reid	4	2
WC	(South Korea) J-s Nam	5	7	6
(Australia) L Saville	7	5	2
(Japan) S Sekiguchi	1	4
2	(Japan) G Soeda	6	6

Quarterfinals
(Switzerland) M Chiudinelli	4	7^{7}	6
(Russia) K Kravchuk	6	6^{3}	3
WC	(South Korea) J-s Nam	4	4
2	(Japan) G Soeda	6	6

Semifinals
(Switzerland) M Chiudinelli	4	6^{6}
2	(Japan) G Soeda	6	7^{8}
