= 2017 Busan Open – Singles =

Singles
- 2017 Busan Open

Final
- Champion: (Canada) Vasek Pospisil
- Runner-up: (Japan) Go Soeda
- Score: 6–1, 6–2

Events
Singles	Doubles
- Busan Open

Konstantin Kravchuk was the defending champion but lost in the first round to Kwon Soon-woo.

Vasek Pospisil won the title after defeating Go Soeda 6–1, 6–2 in the final.

== Seeds ==
1. (Chinese Taipei) Lu Yen-hsun (quarterfinals, retired)
2. (Canada) Vasek Pospisil (champion)
3. (Slovenia) Blaž Kavčič (second round)
4. (Israel) Dudi Sela (semifinals)
5. (Ukraine) Illya Marchenko (first round)
6. (Russia) Konstantin Kravchuk (first round)
7. (Italy) Thomas Fabbiano (first round)
8. (Belgium) Ruben Bemelmans (first round)

== Draw ==
Key

- Q = Qualifier
- WC = Wild card
- LL = Lucky loser
- Alt = Alternate
- ITF = ITF entry
- PR = Protected ranking
- SR = Special ranking
- SE = Special exempt
- JE = Junior exempt
- JR = Junior Accelerator Programme entrant
- CO = College Accelerator Programme entrant
- NG = Next Gen Accelerator Program entrant
- w/o = Walkover
- r = Retired
- d = Defaulted

=== Finals ===
Semifinals
(South Korea) Kwon Soon-woo	4	2
(Japan) Go Soeda	6	6
4	(Israel) Dudi Sela	4	3
2	(Canada) Vasek Pospisil	6	6

Final
(Japan) Go Soeda	1	2
2	(Canada) Vasek Pospisil	6	6

=== Top half ===
First round
1	(Chinese Taipei) Y-h Lu	6	6
(Chinese Taipei) T Chen	4	4
(Australia) M Purcell	6^{3}	6	3
Q	(United States) R Sarmiento	7^{7}	1	6
(South Korea) D-h Lee	6	6
(United States) A Sarkissian	3	2
(South Korea) S-w Kwon	7^{7}	6
6	(Russia) K Kravchuk	6^{4}	3
3	(Slovenia) B Kavčič	6	6^{2}	7
Alt	(United States) S Bangoura	0	7^{7}	5
WC	(South Korea) S-c Hong	6	3	1
(Japan) G Soeda	2	6	6
(Japan) H Moriya	6	6
Q	(United Kingdom) E Corrie	4	4
(Australia) M Ebden	6	6
5	(Ukraine) I Marchenko	2	3

Second round
1	(Chinese Taipei) Y-h Lu	4	6	6
Q	(United States) R Sarmiento	6	4	3
(South Korea) D-h Lee	7^{9}	6^{2}	4
(South Korea) S-w Kwon	6^{7}	7^{7}	6
3	(Slovenia) B Kavčič	4	6	3
(Japan) G Soeda	6	0	6
(Japan) H Moriya	3	2
(Australia) M Ebden	6	6

Quarterfinals
1	(Chinese Taipei) Y-h Lu	5	0^{r}
(South Korea) S-w Kwon	7	0
(Japan) G Soeda	3	6	6
(Australia) M Ebden	6	3	3

Semifinals
(South Korea) S-w Kwon	4	2
(Japan) G Soeda	6	6

=== Bottom half ===
First round
8	(Belgium) R Bemelmans	3	3
Q	(United States) A Krajicek	6	6
(United Kingdom) B Klein	6	6
(Serbia) M Tepavac	3	0
WC	(South Korea) Oh Chan-yeong	6	2	2
(France) S Doumbia	2	6	6
WC	(Chinese Taipei) T-l Wu	1	6	5
4	(Israel) D Sela	6	2	7
7	(Italy) T Fabbiano	4	2
(Japan) T Ito	6	6
(Japan) Yuya Kibi	1	6	4
WC	(South Korea) Ho Chung	6	4	6
Q	(United Kingdom) L Broady	6	6
PR	(United Kingdom) A Ward	2	0
(Switzerland) M Chiudinelli	2	5
2	(Canada) V Pospisil	6	7

Second round
Q	(United States) A Krajicek	6	6
(United Kingdom) B Klein	4	2
(France) S Doumbia	2	3
4	(Israel) D Sela	6	6
(Japan) T Ito	6	1	6
WC	(South Korea) Ho Chung	2	6	1
Q	(United Kingdom) L Broady	3	6^{2}
2	(Canada) V Pospisil	6	7^{7}

Quarterfinals
Q	(United States) A Krajicek	4	2
4	(Israel) D Sela	6	6
(Japan) T Ito	3	5
2	(Canada) V Pospisil	6	7

Semifinals
4	(Israel) D Sela	4	3
2	(Canada) V Pospisil	6	6
