= 2022 Busan Open – Singles =

Singles
- 2022 Busan Open

Final
- Champion: (Poland) Kamil Majchrzak
- Runner-up: (Moldova) Radu Albot
- Score: 6–4, 3–6, 6–2

Events
Singles	Doubles
← 2019 ·	Busan Open	· 2023 →

Ričardas Berankis was the defending champion but chose not to defend his title.

Kamil Majchrzak won the title after defeating Radu Albot 6–4, 3–6, 6–2 in the final.

== Seeds ==
1. (South Korea) Kwon Soon-woo (quarterfinals)
2. (Moldova) Radu Albot (final)
3. (Chinese Taipei) Tseng Chun-hsin (first round)
4. (Ecuador) Emilio Gómez (withdrew)
5. (Australia) Christopher O'Connell (semifinals)
6. (Poland) Kamil Majchrzak (champion)
7. (Australia) James Duckworth (first round)
8. (Australia) John Millman (quarterfinals)
9. (United States) Christopher Eubanks (quarterfinals)

== Draw ==
=== Key ===
- Q = Qualifier
- WC = Wild card
- LL = Lucky loser
- Alt = Alternate
- SE = Special exempt
- PR = Protected ranking
- ITF = ITF entry
- JE = Junior exempt
- w/o = Walkover
- r = Retired
- d = Defaulted
- SR = Special ranking

=== Finals ===
Semifinals
6	(Poland) Kamil Majchrzak	7^{7}	6
5	(Australia) Christopher O'Connell	6^{3}	4
LL	(South Korea) Hong Seong-chan	6^{2}	3
2	(Moldova) Radu Albot	7^{7}	6

Final
6	(Poland) Kamil Majchrzak	6	3	6
2	(Moldova) Radu Albot	4	6	2

=== Top half ===
First round
1/WC	(South Korea) S-w Kwon	6	6
Q	(Austria) M Neuchrist	4	2
Q	(Japan) S Mochizuki	4	3
(Australia) A Vukic	6	6
Q	(United States) K Smith	4	5
(Serbia) H Međedović	6	7
(Germany) M Marterer	3	1
6	(Poland) K Majchrzak	6	6
9	(United States) C Eubanks	6	6
LL	(Japan) N Nakagawa	0	3
(Belgium) K Coppejans	4	6	7
(United States) A Kovacevic	6	4	5
(Japan) K Uchida	3	3
WC	(South Korea) J-s Nam	6	6
Q	(India) M Sasikumar	4	2
5	(Australia) C O'Connell	6	6

Second round
1/WC	(South Korea) S-w Kwon	6	6
(Australia) A Vukic	4	2
(Serbia) H Međedović	6^{1}	4
6	(Poland) K Majchrzak	7^{7}	6
9	(United States) C Eubanks	7^{7}	6
(Belgium) K Coppejans	6^{2}	3
WC	(South Korea) J-s Nam	3	2
5	(Australia) C O'Connell	6	6

Quarterfinals
1/WC	(South Korea) S-w Kwon	2	7^{7}	5
6	(Poland) K Majchrzak	6	6^{4}	7
9	(United States) C Eubanks	6^{3}	6	1
5	(Australia) C O'Connell	7^{7}	4	6

Semifinals
6	(Poland) K Majchrzak	7^{7}	6
5	(Australia) C O'Connell	6^{3}	4

=== Bottom half ===
First round
8	(Australia) J Millman	6	6
(Czech Republic) D Svrčina	3	4
LL	(Czech Republic) M Gengel	1	6	6
(Japan) H Moriya	6	4	2
LL	(South Korea) S-c Hong	6	3	6
(Australia) L Tu	3	6	1
WC	(South Korea) Y-s Chung	7	7
3	(Chinese Taipei) C-h Tseng	5	5
7	(Australia) J Duckworth	4	6	4
PR	(Australia) M Polmans	6	2	6
(Australia) R Hijikata	6	6^{12}	4
Q	(Australia) M Purcell	3	7^{14}	6
(Tunisia) S Mansouri	6^{5}	6^{2}
Q	(Belgium) J De Loore	7^{7}	7^{7}
(Chinese Taipei) T-l Wu	3	6	2
2	(Moldova) R Albot	6	2	6

Second round
8	(Australia) J Millman	6	6
LL	(Czech Republic) M Gengel	3	3
LL	(South Korea) S-c Hong	6	7
WC	(South Korea) Y-s Chung	3	5
PR	(Australia) M Polmans	6	6
Q	(Australia) M Purcell	2	4
Q	(Belgium) J De Loore	5	0^{r}
2	(Moldova) R Albot	7	2

Quarterfinals
8	(Australia) J Millman	6	4	5
LL	(South Korea) S-c Hong	3	6	7
PR	(Australia) M Polmans	5	2^{r}
2	(Moldova) R Albot	7	4

Semifinals
LL	(South Korea) S-c Hong	6^{2}	3
2	(Moldova) R Albot	7^{7}	6
