= 2014 Busan Open Challenger Tour =

- Date: 12–18 May
- Edition: 13th
- Draw: 32S / 16D
- Prize money: $75,000+H
- Surface: Hard
- Location: Busan, South Korea

Champions

Singles
- (Japan) Go Soeda

Doubles
- (Thailand) Sanchai Ratiwatana / (Thailand) Sonchat Ratiwatana
← 2013 ·	Busan Open Challenger Tour	· 2015 →

The 2014 Busan Open Challenger Tour was a professional tennis tournament played on hard courts. It was the thirteenth edition of the tournament which was part of the 2014 ATP Challenger Tour. It took place in Busan, South Korea between 12 and 18 May 2014.

== Singles main-draw entrants ==
=== Seeds ===
Country	Player	Rank^{1}	Seed
SVK	Lukáš Lacko	93	1
JPN	Go Soeda	123	2
~~LUX~~	~~Gilles Müller~~	~~134~~	~~3~~
USA	Rajeev Ram	136	4
AUS	Samuel Groth	141	5
JPN	Tatsuma Ito	143	6
~~JPN~~	~~Yūichi Sugita~~	~~153~~	~~7~~
TPE	Jimmy Wang	154	8
AUS	John-Patrick Smith	181	9

- ^{1} Rankings are as of May 5, 2014.

=== Other entrants ===
The following players received wildcards into the singles main draw:

- (South Korea) Chung Hyeon
- (South Korea) Kim Cheong-eui
- (South Korea) Lee Duckhee
- (South Korea) Nam Ji-sung

The following players used protected ranking to gain entry into the singles main draw:

- (Australia) John Millman

The following players received entry from the qualifying draw:

- (United States) Jason Jung
- (South Africa) Fritz Wolmarans
- (Thailand) Danai Udomchoke
- (South Africa) Rik de Voest

== Doubles main-draw entrants ==
=== Seeds ===
Country	Player	Country	Player	Rank^{1}	Seed
THA	Sanchai Ratiwatana	THA	Sonchat Ratiwatana	190	1
AUS	Alex Bolt	AUS	Andrew Whittington	191	2
GBR	Jamie Delgado	AUS	John-Patrick Smith	199	3
RUS	Victor Baluda	RUS	Konstantin Kravchuk	240	4

- ^{1} Rankings as of May 5, 2014.

=== Other entrants ===
The following pairs received wildcards into the singles main draw:

- (South Korea) Nam Ji-sung / (South Korea) Noh Sang-woo
- (South Korea) Chung Hyeon / (South Korea) Lim Yong-kyu
- (China) Gong Maoxin / (Chinese Taipei) Peng Hsien-yin

The following pairs received entry from the qualifying draw:

- (South Korea) Jun Woong-sun / (South Korea) Na Jung-woong

== Champions ==
=== Singles ===
- (Japan) Go Soeda def. (Chinese Taipei) Jimmy Wang, 6–3, 7–6^{(7–5)}

=== Doubles ===
- (Thailand) Sanchai Ratiwatana / (Thailand) Sonchat Ratiwatana def. (United Kingdom) Jamie Delgado / (Australia) John-Patrick Smith, 6–4, 6–4
