= 2024 Busan Open – Singles =

Singles
- 2024 Busan Open

Final
- Champion: (Japan) Yasutaka Uchiyama
- Runner-up: (South Korea) Hong Seong-chan
- Score: 7–6^{(7–4)}, 6–3

Events
Singles	Doubles
← 2023 ·	Busan Open	· 2025 →

Aleksandar Vukic was the defending champion but chose not to defend his title.

Yasutaka Uchiyama won the title after defeating Hong Seong-chan 7–6^{(7–4)}, 6–3 in the final.

== Seeds ==
1. (Australia) James Duckworth (semifinals)
2. (Finland) Otto Virtanen (first round)
3. (Japan) Sho Shimabukuro (first round)
4. (Italy) Mattia Bellucci (first round)
5. (China) Bu Yunchaokete (first round)
6. (South Africa) Lloyd Harris (quarterfinals)
7. (Australia) Li Tu (first round)
8. (Hong Kong) Coleman Wong (quarterfinals)

== Draw ==
=== Key ===
- Q = Qualifier
- WC = Wild card
- LL = Lucky loser
- Alt = Alternate
- SE = Special exempt
- PR = Protected ranking
- ITF = ITF entry
- JE = Junior exempt
- w/o = Walkover
- r = Retired
- d = Defaulted
- SR = Special ranking

=== Finals ===
Semifinals
1	(Australia) James Duckworth	3	6	6^{4}
(Japan) Yasutaka Uchiyama	6	4	7^{7}
WC	(South Korea) Kwon Soon-woo
(South Korea) Hong Seong-chan	w/o

Final
(Japan) Yasutaka Uchiyama	7^{7}	6
(South Korea) Hong Seong-chan	6^{4}	3

=== Top half ===
First round
1	(Australia) J Duckworth	6	6
WC	(South Korea) Roh Ho-young	3	3
(United Kingdom) A Fery	6	6
(France) Jules Marie	2	1
(Ukraine) I Marchenko	6	7^{7}
(Australia) A Bolt	1	6^{1}
Q	(Japan) R Noguchi	7	7
5	(China) Y Bu	5	5
3	(Japan) S Shimabukuro	3	0
(Japan) Y Uchiyama	6	6
Q	(Turkey) Y Erel	6	4	4
(Australia) D Sweeny	4	6	6
(Chinese Taipei) Y-h Hsu	4	3
(Chinese Taipei) T-l Wu	6	6
Q	(United Kingdom) P Jubb	7^{7}	6
7	(Australia) L Tu	6^{3}	1

Second round
1	(Australia) J Duckworth	4	6	6
(United Kingdom) A Fery	6	1	4
(Ukraine) I Marchenko	6	6
Q	(Japan) R Noguchi	2	3
(Japan) Y Uchiyama	6	4	6
(Australia) D Sweeny	2	6	1
(Chinese Taipei) T-l Wu	4	6^{1}
Q	(United Kingdom) P Jubb	6	7^{7}

Quarterfinals
1	(Australia) J Duckworth	7^{7}	3	6
(Ukraine) I Marchenko	6^{5}	6	3
(Japan) Y Uchiyama	4	7	6
Q	(United Kingdom) P Jubb	6	5	3

Semifinals
1	(Australia) J Duckworth	3	6	6^{4}
(Japan) Y Uchiyama	6	4	7^{7}

=== Bottom half ===
First round
6	(South Africa) L Harris	6	6
(Lithuania) R Berankis	3	1
(Australia) P Sekulic	6	6
WC	(South Korea) J-s Nam	1	4
Q	(Turkey) A Çelikbilek	4	6	3
A Kachmazov	6	4	6
WC	(South Korea) S-w Kwon	6	6
4	(Italy) M Bellucci	4	3
8	(Hong Kong) C Wong	6	6
(Belgium) A Blockx	3	3
Q	(Australia) B Ellis	6^{1}	6	7^{7}
(France) A Escoffier	7^{7}	3	6^{4}
Q	(South Korea) Y-s Chung	3	2
(Estonia) M Lajal	6	6
(South Korea) S-c Hong	6	6
2	(Finland) O Virtanen	2	2

Second round
6	(South Africa) L Harris	6	7^{7}
(Australia) P Sekulic	4	6^{3}
A Kachmazov	4	3
WC	(South Korea) S-w Kwon	6	6
8	(Hong Kong) C Wong	7	6
Q	(Australia) B Ellis	5	2
(Estonia) M Lajal	4	4
(South Korea) S-c Hong	6	6

Quarterfinals
6	(South Africa) L Harris	6^{5}	5
WC	(South Korea) S-w Kwon	7^{7}	7
8	(Hong Kong) C Wong	4	6	2
(South Korea) S-c Hong	6	3	6

Semifinals
WC	(South Korea) S-w Kwon
(South Korea) S-c Hong	w/o
