= 2023 Busan Open – Singles =

Singles
- 2023 Busan Open

Final
- Champion: (Australia) Aleksandar Vukic
- Runner-up: (Australia) Max Purcell
- Score: 6–4, 1–0 ret.

Events
Singles	Doubles
← 2022 ·	Busan Open	· 2024 →

Kamil Majchrzak was the defending champion but chose not to defend his title.

Aleksandar Vukic won the title after Max Purcell retired trailing 4–6, 0–1 in the final.

== Seeds ==
1. (Australia) Max Purcell (final, retired)
2. (United States) Christopher Eubanks (quarterfinals)
3. (Australia) Jordan Thompson (quarterfinals)
4. (Ecuador) Emilio Gómez (first round)
5. (Australia) Rinky Hijikata (second round)
6. (Australia) Aleksandar Vukic (champion)
7. (Japan) Kaichi Uchida (first round)
8. (Canada) Gabriel Diallo (semifinals)

== Draw ==
=== Key ===
- Q = Qualifier
- WC = Wild card
- LL = Lucky loser
- Alt = Alternate
- SE = Special exempt
- PR = Protected ranking
- ITF = ITF entry
- JE = Junior exempt
- w/o = Walkover
- r = Retired
- d = Defaulted
- SR = Special ranking

=== Finals ===
Semifinals
1	(Australia) Max Purcell	6	7
8	(Canada) Gabriel Diallo	4	5
(United States) Brandon Holt	6^{4}	1
6	(Australia) Aleksandar Vukic	7^{7}	6

Final
1	(Australia) Max Purcell	4	0^{r}
6	(Australia) Aleksandar Vukic	6	1

=== Top half ===
First round
1	(Australia) M Purcell	6	6
Q	(Japan) Yuki Mochizuki	3	3
Q	(Japan) Renta Tokuda	6^{4}	3
(Chinese Taipei) Y-h Hsu	7^{7}	6
WC	(South Korea) H Chung	3	7^{7}	2
Q	(Japan) Y Uchiyama	6	6^{3}	6
Alt	(Australia) O Jasika	7^{8}	3	2
5	(Australia) R Hijikata	6^{6}	6	6
3	(Australia) J Thompson	6	6
Alt	(Germany) D Masur	1	1
E Donskoy	7	3	6
(Japan) Y Shimizu	5	6	0
WC	(South Korea) Y-s Chung	7	6
(Chinese Taipei) T-l Wu	5	2
WC	(South Korea) J-s Nam	3	3
8	(Canada) G Diallo	6	6

Second round
1	(Australia) M Purcell	6	6
(Chinese Taipei) Y-h Hsu	2	4
Q	(Japan) Y Uchiyama	6	3	6
5	(Australia) R Hijikata	4	6	4
3	(Australia) J Thompson	7	6
E Donskoy	5	3
WC	(South Korea) Y-s Chung	6^{5}	6^{4}
8	(Canada) G Diallo	7^{7}	7^{7}

Quarterfinals
1	(Australia) M Purcell	6	7
Q	(Japan) Y Uchiyama	4	5
3	(Australia) J Thompson	3	5
8	(Canada) G Diallo	6	7

Semifinals
1	(Australia) M Purcell	6	7
8	(Canada) G Diallo	4	5

=== Bottom half ===
First round
7	(Japan) K Uchida	2	4
(Turkey) A Çelikbilek	6	6
(China) Y Bu	4	4
(Australia) L Tu	6	6
(Lithuania) R Berankis	6^{3}	3
Q	(Australia) L Saville	7^{7}	6
(United States) B Holt	6	6
4	(Ecuador) E Gómez	2	2
6	(Australia) A Vukic	7^{7}	6
(South Africa) L Harris	6^{5}	3
(Japan) S Shimabukuro	6^{2}	6	7
Q	(Japan) H Moriya	7^{7}	2	5
Q	(Chinese Taipei) J Jung	6	3
(South Korea) S-c Hong	2	0^{r}
(Australia) M Polmans	6	3	6^{6}
2	(United States) C Eubanks	4	6	7^{8}

Second round
(Turkey) A Çelikbilek	4	6^{5}
(Australia) L Tu	6	7^{7}
Q	(Australia) L Saville	3	3
(United States) B Holt	6	6
6	(Australia) A Vukic	7^{7}	6
(Japan) S Shimabukuro	6^{1}	4
Q	(Chinese Taipei) J Jung	4	3
2	(United States) C Eubanks	6	6

Quarterfinals
(Australia) L Tu	4	4
(United States) B Holt	6	6
6	(Australia) A Vukic	6^{4}	7^{7}	6
2	(United States) C Eubanks	7^{7}	6^{3}	4

Semifinals
(United States) B Holt	6^{4}	1
6	(Australia) A Vukic	7^{7}	6
