= 2022 Busan Open – Doubles =

Doubles
- 2022 Busan Open

Final
- Champions: (Australia) Marc Polmans (Australia) Max Purcell
- Runners-up: (South Korea) Nam Ji-sung (South Korea) Song Min-kyu
- Score: 6–7^{(5–7)}, 6–2, [12–10]

Events
Singles	Doubles
← 2019 ·	Busan Open	· 2023 →

Hsieh Cheng-peng and Christopher Rungkat were the defending champions but only Rungkat chose to defend his title, partnering Ruben Gonzales. Rungkat lost in the quarterfinals to Marc Polmans and Max Purcell.

Polmans and Purcell won the title after defeating Nam Ji-sung and Song Min-kyu 6–7^{(5–7)}, 6–2, [12–10] in the final.

== Seeds ==
1. (India) Yuki Bhambri / (India) Saketh Myneni (semifinals)
2. (Philippines) Ruben Gonzales / (Indonesia) Christopher Rungkat (quarterfinals)
3. (United States) Alex Lawson / (United States) Keegan Smith (first round)
4. (Tunisia) Skander Mansouri / (Austria) Maximilian Neuchrist (quarterfinals)

== Draw ==
=== Key ===
- Q = Qualifier
- WC = Wild card
- LL = Lucky loser
- Alt = Alternate
- SE = Special exempt
- PR = Protected ranking
- ITF = ITF entry
- JE = Junior exempt
- w/o = Walkover
- r = Retired
- d = Defaulted
- SR = Special ranking

First round
1	(India) Y Bhambri (India) S Myneni	6	6
WC	(South Korea) Kim Cheong-eui (South Korea) Son Ji-hoon	3	2
4	(Tunisia) S Mansouri (Austria) M Neuchrist	6	6
WC	(South Korea) Ho Chung (South Korea) J-m Lee	2	4
(Czech Republic) M Gengel (Czech Republic) D Svrčina	w/o
(Japan) Y Shimizu (Japan) S Watanabe
(South Korea) Y-s Chung (United States) A Kovacevic	7^{7}	4	[10]
3	(United States) A Lawson (United States) K Smith	6^{4}	6	[6]
PR	(Australia) M Polmans (Australia) M Purcell	6	6
PR	(Japan) T Matsui (Japan) K Uesugi	4	0
(Belgium) K Coppejans (Belgium) J De Loore
2	(Philippines) R Gonzales (Indonesia) C Rungkat	w/o

Quarterfinals
1	(India) Y Bhambri (India) S Myneni	6	6^{0}	[10]
(South Korea) S-c Hong (South Korea) Shin San-hui	2	7^{7}	[6]
4	(Tunisia) S Mansouri (Austria) M Neuchrist	7	4	[10]
(South Korea) J-s Nam (South Korea) M-k Song	5	6	[12]
(Czech Republic) M Gengel (Czech Republic) D Svrčina
(South Korea) Y-s Chung (United States) A Kovacevic	w/o
PR	(Australia) M Polmans (Australia) M Purcell	6	2	[10]
2	(Philippines) R Gonzales (Indonesia) C Rungkat	1	6	[4]

Semifinals
1	(India) Y Bhambri (India) S Myneni	3	1
(South Korea) J-s Nam (South Korea) M-k Song	6	6
(South Korea) Y-s Chung (United States) A Kovacevic
PR	(Australia) M Polmans (Australia) M Purcell	w/o

Final
(South Korea) J-s Nam (South Korea) M-k Song	7^{7}	2	[10]
PR	(Australia) M Polmans (Australia) M Purcell	6^{5}	6	[12]
