= 2018 Busan Open – Singles =

Singles
- 2018 Busan Open

Final
- Champion: (Australia) Matthew Ebden
- Runner-up: (Canada) Vasek Pospisil
- Score: 7–6^{(7–4)}, 6–1

Events
Singles	Doubles
- Busan Open

Vasek Pospisil was the defending champion but lost in the final to Matthew Ebden.

Ebden won the title after defeating Pospisil 7–6^{(7–4)}, 6–1 in the final.

== Seeds ==
1. (Australia) Matthew Ebden (champion)
2. (India) Yuki Bhambri (second round)
3. (Canada) Vasek Pospisil (final)
4. (Israel) Dudi Sela (first round)
5. (Chinese Taipei) Lu Yen-hsun (first round)
6. (United States) Mackenzie McDonald (quarterfinals)
7. (Japan) Go Soeda (second round)
8. (Chinese Taipei) Jason Jung (quarterfinals)

== Draw ==
Key

- Q = Qualifier
- WC = Wild card
- LL = Lucky loser
- Alt = Alternate
- ITF = ITF entry
- PR = Protected ranking
- SR = Special ranking
- SE = Special exempt
- JE = Junior exempt
- JR = Junior Accelerator Programme entrant
- CO = College Accelerator Programme entrant
- NG = Next Gen Accelerator Program entrant
- w/o = Walkover
- r = Retired
- d = Defaulted

=== Finals ===
Semifinals
1	(Australia) Matthew Ebden	6	6
(Canada) Filip Peliwo	3	1
3	(Canada) Vasek Pospisil	6	3	6
Q	(Japan) Yosuke Watanuki	3	6	4

Final
1	(Australia) Matthew Ebden	7^{7}	6
3	(Canada) Vasek Pospisil	6^{4}	1

=== Top half ===
First round
1	(Australia) M Ebden	6	3	6
Q	(South Korea) Y-s Chung	3	6	3
(Japan) T Ito	2	7^{11}	6
(Japan) Y Uchiyama	6	6^{9}	4
(China) D Wu	4	6	1
(China) Z Li	6	3	6
(Japan) H Moriya	1	1
8	(Chinese Taipei) J Jung	6	6
4	(Israel) D Sela	1	4
(Canada) F Peliwo	6	6
(Japan) Y Takahashi	2	1
(South Korea) D-h Lee	6	6
(Japan) K Uchida	6	6
WC	(South Korea) Oh Chan-yeong	1	4
(Canada) B Schnur	6	2	1
6	(United States) M McDonald	2	6	6

Second round
1	(Australia) M Ebden	4	7^{7}	1
(Japan) T Ito	6	6^{1}	0^{r}
(China) Z Li	6^{1}	7	1
8	(Chinese Taipei) J Jung	7^{7}	5	6
(Canada) F Peliwo	4	6	6
(South Korea) D-h Lee	6	2	4
(Japan) K Uchida	6^{4}	3
6	(United States) M McDonald	7^{7}	6

Quarterfinals
1	(Australia) M Ebden	6	6
8	(Chinese Taipei) J Jung	2	2
(Canada) F Peliwo	2	6	7^{8}
6	(United States) M McDonald	6	3	6^{6}

Semifinals
1	(Australia) M Ebden	6	6
(Canada) F Peliwo	3	1

=== Bottom half ===
First round
7	(Japan) G Soeda	6	6
Q	(New Zealand) R Statham	3	3
WC	(South Korea) Kim Young-seok	3	3
(United States) M Giron	6	6
(Australia) M Purcell	6	6
WC	(South Korea) J-w Na	4	1
Q	(Australia) M Banes	7^{7}	1	5
3	(Canada) V Pospisil	6^{2}	6	7
5	(Chinese Taipei) Y-h Lu	1	2
Q	(Japan) Yo Watanuki	6	6
WC	(South Korea) S-c Hong	2	4
(Australia) J-P Smith	6	6
(China) Ze Zhang	6	6
(Australia) D Kelly	1	4
SE	(Japan) Y Nishioka	6	6^{6}	0^{r}
2	(India) Y Bhambri	3	7^{8}	3

Second round
7	(Japan) G Soeda	4	4
(United States) M Giron	6	6
(Australia) M Purcell	2	3
3	(Canada) V Pospisil	6	6
Q	(Japan) Yo Watanuki	7^{13}	6
(Australia) J-P Smith	6^{11}	4
(China) Ze Zhang	6	6
2	(India) Y Bhambri	4	3

Quarterfinals
(United States) M Giron	6	2	4
3	(Canada) V Pospisil	3	6	6
Q	(Japan) Yo Watanuki	4	6	6
(China) Ze Zhang	6	4	1

Semifinals
3	(Canada) V Pospisil	6	3	6
Q	(Japan) Yo Watanuki	3	6	4
