= 2023 Busan Open – Doubles =

Doubles
- 2023 Busan Open

Final
- Champions: (United States) Evan King (United States) Reese Stalder
- Runners-up: (Australia) Max Purcell (New Zealand) Rubin Statham
- Score: Walkover

Events
Singles	Doubles
← 2022 ·	Busan Open	· 2024 →

Marc Polmans and Max Purcell, the defending champions, opted to defend their title with new partners. Polmans teamed up with Chung Yun-seong but was defeated in the first round by Evan King and Reese Stalder. Purcell joined forces with Rubin Statham but withdrew before the final due to an injury.

King and Stalder claimed the title after Purcell and Statham's withdrawal before the final.

== Seeds ==
1. (Australia) Andrew Harris / (Australia) John-Patrick Smith (first round)
2. (United States) Evan King / (United States) Reese Stalder (champions)
3. (India) Anirudh Chandrasekar / (India) Vijay Sundar Prashanth (first round)
4. (Australia) Max Purcell / (New Zealand) Rubin Statham (final, withdrew)

== Draw ==
Key

- Q = Qualifier
- WC = Wild card
- LL = Lucky loser
- Alt = Alternate
- ITF = ITF entry
- PR = Protected ranking
- SR = Special ranking
- SE = Special exempt
- JE = Junior exempt
- JR = Junior Accelerator Programme entrant
- CO = College Accelerator Programme entrant
- NG = Next Gen Accelerator Program entrant
- w/o = Walkover
- r = Retired
- d = Defaulted

First round
1	(Australia) A Harris (Australia) J-P Smith	4	2
(India) A Kadhe (South Korea) J-s Nam	6	6
(Japan) S Hazawa (Czech Republic) D Palán	3	4
WC	(South Korea) Choe Jae-sung (South Korea) U-s Park	6	6
4	(Australia) M Purcell (New Zealand) R Statham	7	3	[10]
(New Zealand) A Rai (China) Y Bu	5	6	[5]
(Australia) L Saville (Japan) Y Uchiyama	3	7^{13}	[6]
(Chinese Taipei) Y-h Hsu (Japan) Y Shimizu	6	6^{11}	[10]
Alt	(Chinese Taipei) J Jung (Japan) H Moriya	6	6
Alt	(Germany) D Masur (India) M Sasikumar	2	2
WC	(South Korea) J-m Lee (South Korea) Shin Woo-bin	5	7^{9}	[10]
3	(India) A Chandrasekar (India) VS Prashanth	7	6^{7}	[8]
(Australia) R Hijikata (Australia) L Tu	7	7^{8}
(Japan) T Matsui (Japan) K Uesugi	5	6^{6}
(South Korea) Y-s Chung (Australia) M Polmans	2	7^{7}	[8]
2	(United States) E King (United States) R Stalder	6	6^{1}	[10]

Quarterfinals
(India) A Kadhe (South Korea) J-s Nam	7^{7}	6
WC	(South Korea) J-s Choe (South Korea) U-s Park	6^{3}	3
4	(Australia) M Purcell (New Zealand) R Statham	6^{3}	6	[10]
(Chinese Taipei) Y-h Hsu (Japan) Y Shimizu	7^{7}	4	[7]
Alt	(Chinese Taipei) J Jung (Japan) H Moriya	4	5
WC	(South Korea) J-m Lee (South Korea) W-b Shin	6	7
(Australia) R Hijikata (Australia) L Tu
2	(United States) E King (United States) R Stalder	w/o

Semifinals
(India) A Kadhe (South Korea) J-s Nam	4	6	[8]
4	(Australia) M Purcell (New Zealand) R Statham	6	4	[10]
WC	(South Korea) J-m Lee (South Korea) W-b Shin	3	3
2	(United States) E King (United States) R Stalder	6	6

Final
4	(Australia) M Purcell (New Zealand) R Statham
2	(United States) E King (United States) R Stalder	w/o
