= 2019 Busan Open – Doubles =

Doubles
- 2019 Busan Open

Final
- Champions: (Chinese Taipei) Hsieh Cheng-peng (Indonesia) Christopher Rungkat
- Runners-up: (Japan) Toshihide Matsui (India) Vishnu Vardhan
- Score: 7–6^{(9–7)}, 6–1

Events
Singles	Doubles
← 2018 ·	Busan Open	· 2022 →

Hsieh Cheng-peng and Christopher Rungkat were the defending champions and successfully defended their title, defeating Toshihide Matsui and Vishnu Vardhan 7–6^{(9–7)}, 6–1 in the final.

== Seeds ==
1. (Chinese Taipei) Hsieh Cheng-peng / (Indonesia) Christopher Rungkat (champions)
2. (Australia) Max Purcell / (Australia) Luke Saville (first round)
3. (Netherlands) Sander Arends / (Austria) Tristan-Samuel Weissborn (semifinals)
4. (India) Sriram Balaji / (Israel) Jonathan Erlich (quarterfinals)

== Draw ==
=== Key ===
- Q = Qualifier
- WC = Wild card
- LL = Lucky loser
- Alt = Alternate
- SE = Special exempt
- PR = Protected ranking
- ITF = ITF entry
- JE = Junior exempt
- w/o = Walkover
- r = Retired
- d = Defaulted
- SR = Special ranking

First round
1	(Chinese Taipei) C-p Hsieh (Indonesia) C Rungkat	6	6
(India) R Ramanathan (Canada) B Schnur	2	4
WC	(South Korea) J-s Nam (South Korea) M-k Song	7	6
(Philippines) R Gonzales (Thailand) Sa Ratiwatana	5	2
3	(Netherlands) S Arends (Austria) T-S Weissborn	6	6
(United States) E King (United States) N Pasha	3	4
(Australia) M Reid (Canada) A Shamasdin	3	4
(Netherlands) D Pel (Chile) H Podlipnik Castillo	6	6
(Japan) T Matsui (India) V Vardhan	6	2	[10]
WC	(South Korea) Han Seon-yong (South Korea) Kim Cheong-eui	2	6	[4]
(Chinese Taipei) J Jung (Chinese Taipei) T-h Yang	4	4
4	(India) S Balaji (Israel) J Erlich	6	6
WC	(South Korea) Y-s Chung (South Korea) Kim Young-seok	6^{8}	4
(Sweden) A Göransson (United States) H Reese	7^{10}	6
(Belgium) R Bemelmans (Ukraine) S Stakhovsky	7^{8}	5	[10]
2	(Australia) M Purcell (Australia) L Saville	6^{6}	7	[7]

Quarterfinals
1	(Chinese Taipei) C-p Hsieh (Indonesia) C Rungkat	6	6
WC	(South Korea) J-s Nam (South Korea) M-k Song	3	4
3	(Netherlands) S Arends (Austria) T-S Weissborn	7	7^{7}
(Netherlands) D Pel (Chile) H Podlipnik Castillo	5	6^{2}
(Japan) T Matsui (India) V Vardhan	6	7
4	(India) S Balaji (Israel) J Erlich	4	5
(Sweden) A Göransson (United States) H Reese	6	6
(Belgium) R Bemelmans (Ukraine) S Stakhovsky	3	4

Semifinals
1	(Chinese Taipei) C-p Hsieh (Indonesia) C Rungkat	7^{9}	6
3	(Netherlands) S Arends (Austria) T-S Weissborn	6^{7}	2
(Japan) T Matsui (India) V Vardhan	6	7
(Sweden) A Göransson (United States) H Reese	4	5

Final
1	(Chinese Taipei) C-p Hsieh (Indonesia) C Rungkat	7^{9}	6
(Japan) T Matsui (India) V Vardhan	6^{7}	1
