= 2013 Busan Open Challenger Tennis – Doubles =

Doubles
- 2013 Busan Open Challenger Tennis

Final
- Champions: (Chinese Taipei) Peng Hsien-yin (Chinese Taipei) Yang Tsung-hua
- Runners-up: (South Korea) Jeong Suk-young (South Korea) Lim Yong-kyu
- Score: 6–4, 6–3

Events
| Singles | Doubles |
| ← 2012 · | Busan Open Challenger Tennis | · 2014 → |

Yuki Bhambri and Divij Sharan were the defending champions.
Bhambri decided not to participate whereas Sharan competed with Purav Raja, but they lost to Alex Bogomolov Jr. and Dudi Sela in the first round.
Peng Hsien-yin and Yang Tsung-hua defeated Jeong Suk-young and Lim Yong-kyu 6–4, 6–3 in the final to win the title.

== Seeds ==
1. (Thailand) Sanchai Ratiwatana / (Thailand) Sonchat Ratiwatana (first round)
2. (India) Purav Raja / (India) Divij Sharan (first round)
3. (Austria) Philipp Oswald / (Sweden) Andreas Siljeström (quarterfinals)
4. (South Africa) Rik de Voest / (Australia) Chris Guccione (first round)

== Draw ==
=== Key ===
- Q = Qualifier
- WC = Wild card
- LL = Lucky loser
- Alt = Alternate
- SE = Special exempt
- PR = Protected ranking
- ITF = ITF entry
- JE = Junior exempt
- w/o = Walkover
- r = Retired
- d = Defaulted
- SR = Special ranking

=== Draw ===
First round
1 | (Thailand) Sa Ratiwatana (Thailand) So Ratiwatana | 2 | 4
(Chinese Taipei) H-y Peng (Chinese Taipei) T-h Yang | 6 | 6
WC | (South Korea) H Chung (South Korea) J-s Nam | 6 | 7
(Thailand) D Udomchoke (Chinese Taipei) J Wang | 3 | 5
3 | (Austria) P Oswald (Sweden) A Siljeström | 6 | 6
WC | (South Korea) K-t Im (South Korea) H-t Lee | 2 | 2
(United Kingdom) B Klein (Australia) D Propoggia | 4 | 3
PR | (Australia) K Hensel (New Zealand) J Statham | 6 | 6
(Japan) Y Ito (Japan) H Kondo | 2 | 5
(Switzerland) M Chiudinelli (Slovakia) L Lacko | 6 | 7
WC | (South Korea) S-y Jeong (South Korea) Y-k Lim | 6^{5} | 6 | [10]
4 | (South Africa) R de Voest (Australia) C Guccione | 7^{7} | 3 | [5]
(Australia) M Ebden (Spain) E López-Pérez | 6 | 6
(Chinese Taipei) C-p Hsieh (Chinese Taipei) H-h Lee | 3 | 4
(Russia) A Bogomolov Jr. (Israel) D Sela | 6 | 6
2 | (India) P Raja (India) D Sharan | 3 | 2

Quarterfinals
(Chinese Taipei) H-y Peng (Chinese Taipei) T-h Yang | 2 | 6 | [10]
WC | (South Korea) H Chung (South Korea) J-s Nam | 6 | 3 | [2]
3 | (Austria) P Oswald (Sweden) A Siljeström | 3 | 7 | [6]
PR | (Australia) K Hensel (New Zealand) J Statham | 6 | 5 | [10]
(Switzerland) M Chiudinelli (Slovakia) L Lacko
WC | (South Korea) S-y Jeong (South Korea) Y-k Lim | w/o
(Australia) M Ebden (Spain) E López-Pérez | w/o
(Russia) A Bogomolov Jr. (Israel) D Sela

Semifinals
(Chinese Taipei) H-y Peng (Chinese Taipei) T-h Yang | 7 | 7
(Australia) K Hensel (New Zealand) J Statham | 5 | 5
WC | (South Korea) S-y Jeong (South Korea) Y-k Lim | 6 | 6
(Australia) M Ebden (Spain) E López-Pérez | 2 | 2

Final
(Chinese Taipei) H-y Peng (Chinese Taipei) T-h Yang | 6 | 6
WC | (South Korea) S-y Jeong (South Korea) Y-k Lim | 4 | 3
