= 2013 Busan Open Challenger Tennis – Singles =

Singles
- 2013 Busan Open Challenger Tennis

Final
- Champion: (Israel) Dudi Sela
- Runner-up: (Russia) Alex Bogomolov Jr.
- Score: 6–1, 6–4

Events
Singles	Doubles
← 2012 ·	Busan Open Challenger Tennis	· 2014 →

Tatsuma Ito was the defending champion, but lost to Dudi Sela in the quarterfinals.
Sela went on to win the title by defeating Alex Bogomolov Jr. 6–1, 6–4 in the final.

== Seeds ==
1. (Chinese Taipei) Lu Yen-hsun (first round)
2. (Slovakia) Lukáš Lacko (first round)
3. (Israel) Dudi Sela (champion)
4. (Russia) Alex Bogomolov Jr. (final)
5. (Japan) Go Soeda (first round)
6. (Japan) Tatsuma Ito (quarterfinals)
7. (Australia) Matthew Ebden (quarterfinals)
8. (Japan) Yūichi Sugita (first round, retired)

== Draw ==
=== Key ===
- Q = Qualifier
- WC = Wild card
- LL = Lucky loser
- Alt = Alternate
- SE = Special exempt
- PR = Protected ranking
- ITF = ITF entry
- JE = Junior exempt
- w/o = Walkover
- r = Retired
- d = Defaulted
- SR = Special ranking

=== Finals ===
Semifinals
(Republic of Ireland) James McGee	3	1
4	(Russia) Alex Bogomolov Jr.	6	6
3	(Israel) Dudi Sela	6	6
(Chinese Taipei) Jimmy Wang	2	2

Final
4	(Russia) Alex Bogomolov Jr.	1	4
3	(Israel) Dudi Sela	6	6

=== Top half ===
First round
1	(Chinese Taipei) Y-h Lu	4	6^{3}
(Spain) E López-Pérez	6	7^{7}
(South Africa) R de Voest	6	6^{4}	0
(Republic of Ireland) J McGee	2	7^{7}	6
(United Kingdom) B Klein	3	3
(Belgium) R Bemelmans	6	6
(Thailand) D Udomchoke	3
8	(Japan) Y Sugita	0^{r}
4	(Russia) A Bogomolov Jr.	6	4	6
(Indonesia) C Rungkat	3	6	3
Q	(Lithuania) L Grigelis	4	2
(Israel) A Weintraub	6	6
Q	(New Zealand) J Statham	6	4	6^{10}
Q	(Australia) D Propoggia	3	6	7^{12}
WC	(South Korea) Y-k Lim	6	2	0
7	(Australia) M Ebden	4	6	6

Second round
(Spain) E López-Pérez	3	4
(Republic of Ireland) J McGee	6	6
(Belgium) R Bemelmans	3	6	3
(Thailand) D Udomchoke	6	3	6
4	(Russia) A Bogomolov Jr.	6	6
(Israel) A Weintraub	2	3
Q	(Australia) D Propoggia	6^{4}	1
7	(Australia) M Ebden	7^{7}	6

Quarterfinals
(Republic of Ireland) J McGee	6	1	6
(Thailand) D Udomchoke	3	6	3
4	(Russia) A Bogomolov Jr.	6	2	6
7	(Australia) M Ebden	4	6	1

Semifinals
(Republic of Ireland) J McGee	3	1
4	(Russia) A Bogomolov Jr.	6	6

=== Bottom half ===
First round
6	(Japan) T Ito	6	6
Q	(Japan) Y Ito	4	2
WC	(South Korea) D-h Lee	6^{6}	1
(China) D Wu	7^{8}	6
WC	(South Korea) J-s Nam	6	3	2
(Chinese Taipei) T-h Yang	2	6	6
(Australia) J-P Smith	2	2
3	(Israel) D Sela	6	6
5	(Japan) G Soeda	2	6^{4}
(Japan) H Moriya	6	7^{7}
(Chinese Taipei) J Wang	6	3
(Switzerland) M Chiudinelli	2	0^{r}
(South Korea) S-y Jeong	6^{1}	6	6
WC	(South Korea) H Chung	7^{7}	3	1
(China) Z Zhang	7^{7}	6
2	(Slovakia) L Lacko	6^{3}	3

Second round
6	(Japan) T Ito	6	2	6
(China) D Wu	2	6	4
(Chinese Taipei) T-h Yang	6	2	0
3	(Israel) D Sela	3	6	6
(Japan) H Moriya	2	4
(Chinese Taipei) J Wang	6	6
(South Korea) S-y Jeong	3	2
(China) Z Zhang	6	6

Quarterfinals
6	(Japan) T Ito	4	5
3	(Israel) D Sela	6	7
(Chinese Taipei) J Wang	6	2	7^{7}
(China) Z Zhang	4	6	6^{2}

Semifinals
3	(Israel) D Sela	6	6
(Chinese Taipei) J Wang	2	2
