= 2023 Busan Open =

- Date: 8–14 May
- Edition: 20th
- Surface: Hard
- Location: Busan, South Korea

Champions

Singles
- (Australia) Aleksandar Vukic

Doubles
- (United States) Evan King / (United States) Reese Stalder
← 2022 ·	Busan Open	· 2024 →

The 2023 Busan Open was a professional tennis tournament played on hardcourts. It was the 20th edition of the tournament which was part of the 2023 ATP Challenger Tour. It took place in Busan, South Korea between 8 and 14 May 2023.

== Singles main-draw entrants ==
=== Seeds ===
Country	Player	Rank^{1}	Seed
AUS	Max Purcell	89	1
USA	Christopher Eubanks	90	2
AUS	Jordan Thompson	91	3
ECU	Emilio Gómez	115	4
AUS	Rinky Hijikata	141	5
AUS	Aleksandar Vukic	142	6
JPN	Kaichi Uchida	150	7
CAN	Gabriel Diallo	169	8

* ^{1} Rankings as of 24 April 2023.

=== Other entrants ===
The following players received wildcards into the singles main draw:

- (South Korea) Chung Hyeon
- (South Korea) Chung Yun-seong
- (South Korea) Nam Ji-sung

The following players received entry into the singles main draw as alternates:

- (Australia) Omar Jasika
- (Germany) Daniel Masur

The following players received entry from the qualifying draw:

- (Chinese Taipei) Jason Jung
- (Japan) Yuki Mochizuki
- (Japan) Hiroki Moriya
- (Australia) Luke Saville
- (Japan) Renta Tokuda
- (Japan) Yasutaka Uchiyama

== Champions ==
=== Singles ===
- (Australia) Aleksandar Vukic def. (Australia) Max Purcell 6–4, 1–0 ret.

=== Doubles ===
- (United States) Evan King / (United States) Reese Stalder def. (Australia) Max Purcell / (New Zealand) Rubin Statham by walkover.
