= 2009 Busan Open Challenger Tennis =

- Date: May 11 – May 17
- Edition: 7th
- Location: Busan, South Korea

Champions

Singles
- (Thailand) Danai Udomchoke

Doubles
- (Thailand) Sanchai Ratiwatana / (Thailand) Sonchat Ratiwatana
← 2008 ·	Busan Open Challenger Tennis	· 2010 →

The 2009 Busan Open Challenger Tennis was a professional tennis tournament played on outdoor hard courts. It is part of the 2009 ATP Challenger Tour. It took place in Busan, South Korea between May 11 and May 17, 2009.

== Single entrants ==
=== Seeds ===
Nationality	Player	Ranking*	Seeding
JPN	Go Soeda	132	1
THA	Danai Udomchoke	144	2
GER	Florian Mayer	214	3
KOR	Im Kyu-tae	219	4
DEN	Kristian Pless	230	5
SUI	Marco Chiudinelli	243	6
AUS	Samuel Groth	252	7
SLO	Blaž Kavčič	267	8

- Rankings are as of May 4, 2009.

=== Other entrants ===
The following players received wildcards into the singles main draw:

- (South Korea) An Jae-sung
- (South Korea) Lim Yong-kyu
- (South Korea) Jeong Suk-young
- (South Korea) Seo Yong-bum

The following players received entry from the qualifying draw:

- (South Korea) Cho Soong-jae
- (South Korea) Kim Sun-yong
- (Japan) Hiroki Kondo
- (Japan) Gouichi Motomura

== Champions ==
=== Singles ===
(Thailand) Danai Udomchoke def. (Slovenia) Blaž Kavčič, 6–2, 6–2

=== Doubles ===
(Thailand) Sanchai Ratiwatana / (Thailand) Sonchat Ratiwatana def. (Japan) Tasuku Iwami / (Japan) Toshihide Matsui, 6–4, 6–2
