= 2009 Busan Open Challenger Tennis – Doubles =

Doubles
- 2009 Busan Open Challenger Tennis

Final
- Champions: (Thailand) Sanchai Ratiwatana (Thailand) Sonchat Ratiwatana
- Runners-up: (Japan) Tasuku Iwami (Japan) Toshihide Matsui
- Score: 6–4, 6–2

Events
Singles	Doubles
- Busan Open Challenger Tennis

Rik de Voest and Łukasz Kubot were the defending champions; however, they chose to not participate this year.
Twins brothers Sanchai Ratiwatana and Sonchat Ratiwatana defeated 6–4, 6–2 Tasuku Iwami and Toshihide Matsui in the final.

== Seeds ==
1. (Thailand) Sanchai Ratiwatana / (Thailand) Sonchat Ratiwatana
2. (Denmark) Kristian Pless / (Pakistan) Aisam-ul-Haq Qureshi (first round)
3. (Switzerland) Yves Allegro / (Switzerland) Marco Chiudinelli (semifinals)
4. (Latvia) Andis Juška / (Poland) Grzegorz Panfil (first round)

== Draw ==
Key

- Q = Qualifier
- WC = Wild card
- LL = Lucky loser
- Alt = Alternate
- ITF = ITF entry
- PR = Protected ranking
- SR = Special ranking
- SE = Special exempt
- JE = Junior exempt
- JR = Junior Accelerator Programme entrant
- CO = College Accelerator Programme entrant
- NG = Next Gen Accelerator Program entrant
- w/o = Walkover
- r = Retired
- d = Defaulted

=== Draw ===
First round
1	(Thailand) Sa Ratiwatana (Thailand) So Ratiwatana	7	6
(Chinese Taipei) T Chen (Japan) J Mitsuhashi	6^{6}	1
(South Korea) W-S Jun (Slovakia) L Lacko	7	6
WC	(South Korea) D S K Kim (South Korea) H-J Kim	5	3
3	(Switzerland) Y Allegro (Switzerland) M Chiudinelli	6	6
(Czech Republic) D Lojda (Czech Republic) J Minář	0	4
WC	(South Korea) Y-K Lim (South Korea) J-M Seol	7	6
Q	(South Korea) J-S An (South Korea) H-W Nam	6^{8}	1
(South Korea) KT Im (Thailand) D Udomchoke	6^{3}	6	[10]
(Japan) H Kondo (Japan) G Motomura	7	3	[4]
(United Kingdom) C Eaton (Australia) S Groth	6	7
4	(Latvia) A Juška (Poland) G Panfil	3	6^{4}
(Slovakia) K Čapkovič (Slovakia) M Semjan	6	7
WC	(South Korea) SY Jeong (South Korea) W-T Kim	3	6^{6}
(Japan) T Iwami (Japan) T Matsui	6	6
2	(Denmark) K Pless (Pakistan) A-u-H Qureshi	3	4

Quarterfinals
1	(Thailand) Sa Ratiwatana (Thailand) So Ratiwatana	6	6
(South Korea) W-S Jun (Slovakia) L Lacko	2	2
3	(Switzerland) Y Allegro (Switzerland) M Chiudinelli	6	7
WC	(South Korea) Y-K Lim (South Korea) J-M Seol	0	6^{3}
(South Korea) KT Im (Thailand) D Udomchoke	3	6	[5]
(United Kingdom) C Eaton (Australia) S Groth	6	2	[10]
(Slovakia) K Čapkovič (Slovakia) M Semjan	3	4
(Japan) T Iwami (Japan) T Matsui	6	6

Semifinals
1	(Thailand) Sa Ratiwatana (Thailand) So Ratiwatana	6	6
3	(Switzerland) Y Allegro (Switzerland) M Chiudinelli	4	4
(United Kingdom) C Eaton (Australia) S Groth	w/o
(Japan) T Iwami (Japan) T Matsui

Finals
1	(Thailand) Sa Ratiwatana (Thailand) So Ratiwatana	6	6
(Japan) T Iwami (Japan) T Matsui	4	2
