= 2013 Busan Open Challenger Tennis =

Tennis tournament in Busan, South Korea

- Date: 13–19 May
- Edition: 12th
- Draw: 32S / 16D
- Prize money: $75,000+H
- Surface: Hard
- Location: Busan, South Korea

Champions

Singles
- (Israel) Dudi Sela

Doubles
- (Chinese Taipei) Peng Hsien-yin / (Chinese Taipei) Yang Tsung-hua
← 2012 ·	Busan Open Challenger Tennis	· 2014 →

The 2013 Busan Open Challenger Tennis was a professional tennis tournament played on hard courts. It was the twelfth edition of the tournament which was part of the 2013 ATP Challenger Tour. It took place in Busan, South Korea between 13 and 19 May 2013.

== Singles main-draw entrants ==
=== Seeds ===
Country	Player	Rank^{1}	Seed
TPE	Lu Yen-hsun	71	1
SVK	Lukáš Lacko	73	2
ISR	Dudi Sela	107	3
RUS	Alex Bogomolov Jr.	111	4
JPN	Go Soeda	114	5
JPN	Tatsuma Ito	122	6
AUS	Matthew Ebden	134	7
JPN	Yūichi Sugita	138	8

- ^{1} Rankings are as of May 6, 2013.

=== Other entrants ===
The following players received wildcards into the singles main draw:

- (South Korea) Chung Hyeon
- (South Korea) Lee Duck-hee
- (South Korea) Lim Yong-kyu
- (South Korea) Nam Ji-sung

The following players received entry from the qualifying draw:

- (Lithuania) Laurynas Grigelis
- (Japan) Yuichi Ito
- (Australia) Dane Propoggia
- (New Zealand) Jose Rubin Statham

== Doubles main-draw entrants ==
=== Seeds ===
Country	Player	Country	Player	Rank^{1}	Seed
THA	Sanchai Ratiwatana	THA	Sonchat Ratiwatana	150	1
IND	Purav Raja	IND	Divij Sharan	217	2
AUT	Philipp Oswald	SWE	Andreas Siljeström	238	3
RSA	Rik de Voest	AUS	Chris Guccione	238	4

- ^{1} Rankings are as of May 6, 2013.

=== Other entrants ===
The following pairs received wildcards into the doubles main draw:

- (South Korea) Chung Hyeon / (South Korea) Nam Ji-sung
- (South Korea) Im Kyu-tae / (South Korea) Lee Hyung-taik
- (South Korea) Jeong Suk-young / (South Korea) Lim Yong-kyu

== Champions ==
=== Singles ===
- (Israel) Dudi Sela def. (Russia) Alex Bogomolov Jr., 6–1, 6–4

=== Doubles ===
- (Chinese Taipei) Peng Hsien-yin / (Chinese Taipei) Yang Tsung-hua def. (South Korea) Jeong Suk-young / (South Korea) Lim Yong-kyu, 6–4, 6–3
