= 2019 Busan Open =

- Date: 6–12 May
- Edition: 18th
- Draw: 48S / 16D
- Surface: Hard
- Location: Busan, South Korea

Champions

Singles
- (Lithuania) Ričardas Berankis

Doubles
- (Chinese Taipei) Hsieh Cheng-peng / (Indonesia) Christopher Rungkat
← 2018 ·	Busan Open	· 2022 →

The 2019 Busan Open was a professional tennis tournament played on hardcourts. It was the eighteenth edition of the tournament which was part of the 2019 ATP Challenger Tour. It took place in Busan, South Korea between 6 and 12 May 2019.

== Singles main-draw entrants ==
=== Seeds ===
Country	Player	Rank^{1}	Seed
LTU	Ričardas Berankis	102	1
UKR	Sergiy Stakhovsky	115	2
CAN	Brayden Schnur	116	3
SVK	Lukáš Lacko	121	4
TPE	Jason Jung	132	5
CYP	Marcos Baghdatis	135	6
RUS	Evgeny Donskoy	136	7
IND	Ramkumar Ramanathan	146	8
SRB	Nikola Milojević	148	9
JPN	Tatsuma Ito	153	10
KOR	Kwon Soon-woo	162	11
BEL	Ruben Bemelmans	163	12
JPN	Yūichi Sugita	182	13
JPN	Hiroki Moriya	183	14
JPN	Go Soeda	200	15
JPN	Yasutaka Uchiyama	227	16

* ^{1} Rankings as of 29 April 2019.

=== Other entrants ===
The following players received wildcards into the singles main draw:

- (South Korea) Hong Seong-chan
- (South Korea) Kim Cheong-eui
- (South Korea) Kim Young-seok
- (South Korea) Nam Ji-sung
- (South Korea) Song Min-kyu

The following players received entry from the qualifying draw:

- (Japan) Makoto Ochi
- (China) Xia Zihao

== Champions ==
=== Singles ===
- (Lithuania) Ričardas Berankis def. (Australia) Andrew Harris 7–6^{(7–5)}, 6–2.

=== Doubles ===
- (Chinese Taipei) Hsieh Cheng-peng / (Indonesia) Christopher Rungkat def. (Japan) Toshihide Matsui / (India) Vishnu Vardhan 7–6^{(9–7)}, 6–1.
