= 2017 Busan Open – Doubles =

Doubles
- 2017 Busan Open

Final
- Champion: (Chinese Taipei) Hsieh Cheng-peng (Chinese Taipei) Peng Hsien-yin
- Runner-up: (Thailand) Sanchai Ratiwatana (Thailand) Sonchat Ratiwatana
- Score: 7 – 5, 4 – 6, [10 – 8]

Events
Singles	Doubles
- Busan Open

Sam Groth and Leander Paes were the defending champions but chose not to defend their title.

Hsieh Cheng-peng and Peng Hsien-yin won the title after defeating Sanchai and Sonchat Ratiwatana 7–5, 4–6, [10–8] in the final.

== Seeds ==
1. (Thailand) Sanchai Ratiwatana / (Thailand) Sonchat Ratiwatana (final)
2. (Chinese Taipei) Hsieh Cheng-peng / (Chinese Taipei) Peng Hsien-yin (champions)
3. (Chinese Taipei) Chen Ti / (Australia) Bradley Mousley (first round)
4. (Germany) Andre Begemann / (Denmark) Frederik Nielsen (quarterfinals)

== Draw ==
Key

- Q = Qualifier
- WC = Wild card
- LL = Lucky loser
- Alt = Alternate
- ITF = ITF entry
- PR = Protected ranking
- SR = Special ranking
- SE = Special exempt
- JE = Junior exempt
- JR = Junior Accelerator Programme entrant
- CO = College Accelerator Programme entrant
- NG = Next Gen Accelerator Program entrant
- w/o = Walkover
- r = Retired
- d = Defaulted

First round
1	(Thailand) Sa Ratiwatana (Thailand) So Ratiwatana	6	7^{7}
WC	(South Korea) Oh Chan-yeong (South Korea) Son Ji-hoon	4	6^{5}
(Australia) S de Waard (New Zealand) B McLachlan	6	6
(Italy) T Fabbiano (Israel) D Sela	1	2
4	(Germany) A Begemann (Denmark) F Nielsen	6	6
WC	(South Korea) Kim Ji-ha (South Korea) Moon Ju-hae	1	3
WC	(South Korea) S-w Kwon (South Korea) J-m Lee	6	6
(Republic of Ireland) D O'Hare (United Kingdom) J Salisbury	4	4
(Switzerland) M Chiudinelli (Slovenia) B Kavčič	6^{4}	3
(South Africa) R Roelofse (Chinese Taipei) C-h Yi	7^{7}	6
Q	(Austria) L Miedler (Australia) M Purcell	7^{7}	6
3	(Chinese Taipei) T Chen (Australia) B Mousley	6^{1}	1
(United States) S Bangoura (France) S Doumbia	1	7	[6]
(United States) A Krajicek (United States) J Withrow	6	5	[10]
PR	(Australia) M Ebden (United Kingdom) B Klein	3	4
2	(Chinese Taipei) C-p Hsieh (Chinese Taipei) H-y Peng	6	6

Quarterfinals
1	(Thailand) Sa Ratiwatana (Thailand) So Ratiwatana	6	2	[10]
(Australia) S de Waard (New Zealand) B McLachlan	4	6	[8]
4	(Germany) A Begemann (Denmark) F Nielsen	6^{4}	2
WC	(South Korea) S-w Kwon (South Korea) J-m Lee	7^{7}	6
(South Africa) R Roelofse (Chinese Taipei) C-h Yi	7	7^{7}
Q	(Austria) L Miedler (Australia) M Purcell	5	6^{4}
(United States) A Krajicek (United States) J Withrow	4	4
2	(Chinese Taipei) C-p Hsieh (Chinese Taipei) H-y Peng	6	6

Semifinals
1	(Thailand) Sa Ratiwatana (Thailand) So Ratiwatana	6	7
WC	(South Korea) S-w Kwon (South Korea) J-m Lee	4	5
(South Africa) R Roelofse (Chinese Taipei) C-h Yi	3	2
2	(Chinese Taipei) C-p Hsieh (Chinese Taipei) H-y Peng	6	6

Final
1	(Thailand) Sa Ratiwatana (Thailand) So Ratiwatana	5	6	[8]
2	(Chinese Taipei) C-p Hsieh (Chinese Taipei) H-y Peng	7	4	[10]
