= 2022 Busan Open =

- Date: 17–23 October
- Edition: 19th
- Surface: Hard
- Location: Busan, South Korea

Champions

Singles
- (Poland) Kamil Majchrzak

Doubles
- (Australia) Marc Polmans / (Australia) Max Purcell
← 2019 ·	Busan Open	· 2023 →

The 2022 Busan Open was a professional tennis tournament played on hardcourts. It was the 19th edition of the tournament which was part of the 2022 ATP Challenger Tour. It took place in Busan, South Korea between 17 and 23 October 2022.

== Singles main-draw entrants ==
=== Seeds ===
Country	Player	Rank^{1}	Seed
KOR	Kwon Soon-woo	86	1
MDA	Radu Albot	87	2
TPE	Tseng Chun-hsin	88	3
~~ECU~~	~~Emilio Gómez~~	~~98~~	~~4~~
AUS	Christopher O'Connell	109	5
POL	Kamil Majchrzak	111	6
AUS	James Duckworth	114	7
AUS	John Millman	127	8
USA	Christopher Eubanks	129	9

* ^{1} Rankings as of 10 October 2022.

=== Other entrants ===
The following players received wildcards into the singles main draw:

- (South Korea) Chung Yun-seong
- (South Korea) Kwon Soon-woo
- (South Korea) Nam Ji-sung

The following player received entry into the singles main draw using a protected ranking:

- (Australia) Marc Polmans

The following players received entry from the qualifying draw:

- (Belgium) Joris De Loore
- (Japan) Shintaro Mochizuki
- (Austria) Maximilian Neuchrist
- (Australia) Max Purcell
- (India) Mukund Sasikumar
- (United States) Keegan Smith

The following players received entry as lucky losers:

- (South Korea) Hong Seong-chan
- (Czech Republic) Marek Gengel
- (Japan) Naoki Nakagawa

== Champions ==
=== Singles ===
- (Poland) Kamil Majchrzak def. (Moldova) Radu Albot 6–4, 3–6, 6–2.

=== Doubles ===
- (Australia) Marc Polmans / (Australia) Max Purcell def. (South Korea) Nam Ji-sung / (South Korea) Song Min-kyu 6–7^{(5–7)}, 6–2, [12–10].
