= 2011 Busan Open Challenger Tennis – Doubles =

Doubles
- 2011 Busan Open Challenger Tennis

Final
- Champions: (South Korea) Im Kyu-tae (Thailand) Danai Udomchoke
- Runners-up: (United Kingdom) Jamie Baker (Canada) Vasek Pospisil
- Score: 6–4, 6–4

Events
Singles	Doubles
- Busan Open Challenger Tennis

Rameez Junaid and Alexander Peya were the defending champions, but decided not to participate.
Im Kyu-tae and Danai Udomchoke won this tournament, defeating Jamie Baker and Vasek Pospisil 6–4, 6–4 in the final.

== Seeds ==
1. (China) Gong Mao-xin / (China) Li Zhe (quarterfinals)
2. (Germany) Andre Begemann / (Australia) Matthew Ebden (quarterfinals)
3. (United States) John Paul Fruttero / (Thailand) Sonchat Ratiwatana (semifinals)
4. (India) Purav Raja / (India) Divij Sharan (quarterfinals)

== Draw ==
Key

- Q = Qualifier
- WC = Wild card
- LL = Lucky loser
- Alt = Alternate
- ITF = ITF entry
- PR = Protected ranking
- SR = Special ranking
- SE = Special exempt
- JE = Junior exempt
- JR = Junior Accelerator Programme entrant
- CO = College Accelerator Programme entrant
- NG = Next Gen Accelerator Program entrant
- w/o = Walkover
- r = Retired
- d = Defaulted

=== Draw ===
First round
1	(China) M Gong (China) Z Li	6	6
(United States) K Kim (Japan) Y Sugita	3	1
(United Kingdom) J Baker (Canada) V Pospisil	6	6
(Thailand) W Doakmaiklee (Thailand) Sa Ratiwatana	2	3
3	(United States) JP Fruttero (Thailand) So Ratiwatana	6	6
Q	(United States) M McClune (New Zealand) M Venus	1	3
(Israel) D Sela (Israel) A Weintraub	6	6
(Japan) T Ito (Japan) H Kondo	4	4
(Australia) G Jones (Russia) E Kirillov	2	2
(South Korea) K-t Im (Thailand) D Udomchoke	6	6
WC	(South Korea) Hong Chung (South Korea) Nam Ji-sung	3	6	[8]
4	(India) P Raja (India) D Sharan	6	1	[10]
WC	(South Korea) S-y Jeong (South Korea) Noh Sang-woo	3	4
WC	(South Korea) H-j Kim (South Korea) Y-k Lim	6	6
(Finland) H Heliövaara (Australia) J Statham	4	6^{4}
2	(Germany) A Begemann (Australia) M Ebden	6	7

Quarterfinals
1	(China) M Gong (China) Z Li	6	1	[7]
(United Kingdom) J Baker (Canada) V Pospisil	1	6	[10]
3	(United States) JP Fruttero (Thailand) So Ratiwatana	6	6
(Israel) D Sela (Israel) A Weintraub	1	1
(South Korea) K-t Im (Thailand) D Udomchoke	6	7
4	(India) P Raja (India) D Sharan	3	5
WC	(South Korea) H-j Kim (South Korea) Y-k Lim	6	7
2	(Germany) A Begemann (Australia) M Ebden	4	6^{5}

Semifinals
(United Kingdom) J Baker (Canada) V Pospisil	5	6	[10]
3	(United States) JP Fruttero (Thailand) So Ratiwatana	7	2	[8]
(South Korea) K-t Im (Thailand) D Udomchoke	6	6
WC	(South Korea) H-j Kim (South Korea) Y-k Lim	4	2

Final
(United Kingdom) J Baker (Canada) V Pospisil	4	4
(South Korea) K-t Im (Thailand) D Udomchoke	6	6
