= 2011 Busan Open Challenger Tennis – Singles =

Singles
- 2011 Busan Open Challenger Tennis

Final
- Champion: (Israel) Dudi Sela
- Runner-up: (Japan) Tatsuma Ito
- Score: 6–2, 6–7(5), 6–3

Events
Singles	Doubles
- Busan Open Challenger Tennis

Lim Yong-kyu was the defending champion, but lost to Greg Jones in the 2nd round.
Dudi Sela defeated Tatsuma Ito 6–2, 6–7(5), 6–3 in the final match.

== Seeds ==
1. (Chinese Taipei) Lu Yen-hsun (semifinals)
2. (Japan) Go Soeda (semifinals)
3. (Japan) Tatsuma Ito (final)
4. (Israel) Dudi Sela (champion)
5. (Australia) Matthew Ebden (second round)
6. (Japan) Yuichi Sugita (quarterfinals)
7. (Thailand) Danai Udomchoke (second round)
8. (Germany) Andre Begemann (first round)

== Draw ==
Key

- Q = Qualifier
- WC = Wild card
- LL = Lucky loser
- Alt = Alternate
- ITF = ITF entry
- PR = Protected ranking
- SR = Special ranking
- SE = Special exempt
- JE = Junior exempt
- JR = Junior Accelerator Programme entrant
- CO = College Accelerator Programme entrant
- NG = Next Gen Accelerator Program entrant
- w/o = Walkover
- r = Retired
- d = Defaulted

=== Finals ===
Semifinals
1/WC	(Chinese Taipei) Lu Yen-hsun	5	4
3	(Japan) Tatsuma Ito	7	6
4	(Israel) Dudi Sela	1	7	6
2	(Japan) Go Soeda	6	6^{4}	4

Final
3	(Japan) Tatsuma Ito	2	7	3
4	(Israel) Dudi Sela	6	6^{5}	6

=== Top half ===
First round
1/WC	(Chinese Taipei) Y-h Lu	6	6
(Japan) H Kondo	3	2
(France) L Walter	6	6
WC	(South Korea) Nam Ji-sung	1	1
(United States) K Kim	2	4
(South Korea) Y-k Lim	6	6
(Australia) G Jones	7	6
8	(Germany) A Begemann	6^{4}	2
3	(Japan) T Ito	6	6
(Moldova) R Borvanov	3	2
(Finland) H Heliövaara	3	1
(South Korea) K-t Im	6	6
(China) M Gong	4	7	1
(Israel) A Weintraub	6	5	6
Q	(South Korea) J-s An	5	0^{r}
5	(Australia) M Ebden	7	1

Second round
1/WC	(Chinese Taipei) Y-h Lu	6	6
(France) L Walter	1	1
(South Korea) Y-k Lim	4	7	3
(Australia) G Jones	6	6^{1}	6
3	(Japan) T Ito	6	6
(South Korea) K-t Im	1	3
(Israel) A Weintraub	4	7	6
5	(Australia) M Ebden	6	5	3

Quarterfinals
1/WC	(Chinese Taipei) Y-h Lu	3	6	6
(Australia) G Jones	6	1	3
3	(Japan) T Ito	6	6
(Israel) A Weintraub	4	3

Semifinals
1/WC	(Chinese Taipei) Y-h Lu	5	4
3	(Japan) T Ito	7	6

=== Bottom half ===
First round
6	(Japan) Y Sugita	6	6
(New Zealand) M Venus	4	1
WC	(South Korea) S-y Jeong	2	6	6
(Russia) E Kirillov	6	4	3
(South Korea) D Yoo	1	6^{6}
Q	(Japan) T Matsui	6	7
Q	(Russia) M Ledovskikh	4	3
4	(Israel) D Sela	6	6
7	(Thailand) D Udomchoke	6	6
(United States) M McClune	2	4
(Canada) V Pospisil	6	6
(Slovakia) M Mečíř Jr.	4	3
Q	(Japan) T Suzuki	2	6^{5}
WC	(South Korea) H-j Kim	6	7
(United Kingdom) J Baker	3	3
2	(Japan) G Soeda	6	6

Second round
6	(Japan) Y Sugita	3	6	6
WC	(South Korea) S-y Jeong	6	4	2
Q	(Japan) T Matsui	7	4	1
4	(Israel) D Sela	6^{4}	6	6
7	(Thailand) D Udomchoke	6^{4}	2
(Canada) V Pospisil	7	6
WC	(South Korea) H-j Kim	2	2
2	(Japan) G Soeda	6	6

Quarterfinals
6	(Japan) Y Sugita	3	1
4	(Israel) D Sela	6	6
(Canada) V Pospisil	2	4
2	(Japan) G Soeda	6	6

Semifinals
4	(Israel) D Sela	1	7	6
2	(Japan) G Soeda	6	6^{4}	4
