= 2024 Busan Open =

- Date: 8–14 April
- Edition: 21st
- Surface: Hard
- Location: Busan, South Korea

Champions

Singles
- (Japan) Yasutaka Uchiyama

Doubles
- (Chinese Taipei) Ray Ho / (South Korea) Nam Ji-sung
- Busan Open

The 2024 Busan Open was a professional tennis tournament played on hardcourts. It was the 21st edition of the tournament which was part of the 2024 ATP Challenger Tour. It took place in Busan, South Korea between 8 and 14 April 2024.

== Singles main-draw entrants ==
=== Seeds ===
Country	Player	Rank^{1}	Seed
AUS	James Duckworth	105	1
FIN	Otto Virtanen	165	2
JPN	Sho Shimabukuro	169	3
ITA	Mattia Bellucci	178	4
CHN	Bu Yunchaokete	179	5
RSA	Lloyd Harris	181	6
AUS	Li Tu	186	7
HKG	Coleman Wong	192	8

* ^{1} Rankings as of 1 April 2024.

=== Other entrants ===
The following players received wildcards into the singles main draw:

- (South Korea) Kwon Soon-woo
- (South Korea) Nam Ji-sung
- (South Korea) Roh Ho-young

The following players received entry from the qualifying draw:

- (Turkey) Altuğ Çelikbilek
- (South Korea) Chung Yun-seong
- (Australia) Blake Ellis
- (Turkey) Yankı Erel
- (United Kingdom) Paul Jubb
- (Japan) Rio Noguchi

== Champions ==
=== Singles ===
- (Japan) Yasutaka Uchiyama def. (South Korea) Hong Seong-chan 7–6^{(7–4)}, 6–3.

=== Doubles ===
- (Chinese Taipei) Ray Ho / (South Korea) Nam Ji-sung def. (South Korea) Chung Yun-seong / (Chinese Taipei) Hsu Yu-hsiou 6–2, 6–4.
