= 2017 Busan Open =

Professional tennis tournament

- Date: 15–21 May
- Edition: 16th
- Draw: 32S / 16D
- Surface: Hard
- Location: Busan, South Korea

Champions

Singles
- (Canada) Vasek Pospisil

Doubles
- (Chinese Taipei) Hsieh Cheng-peng / (Chinese Taipei) Peng Hsien-yin
- Busan Open

The 2017 Busan Open was a professional tennis tournament played on hardcourts. It was the sixteenth edition of the tournament which was part of the 2017 ATP Challenger Tour. It took place in Busan, South Korea between 15 and 21 May 2017.

== Singles main-draw entrants ==
=== Seeds ===
Country	Player	Rank^{1}	Seed
TPE	Lu Yen-hsun	55	1
CAN	Vasek Pospisil	107	2
SLO	Blaž Kavčič	116	3
ISR	Dudi Sela	117	4
UKR	Illya Marchenko	122	5
RUS	Konstantin Kravchuk	128	6
ITA	Thomas Fabbiano	133	7
BEL	Ruben Bemelmans	137	8

* ^{1} Rankings as of May 8, 2017.

=== Other entrants ===
The following players received wildcards into the singles main draw:

- (South Korea) Chung Hong
- (South Korea) Hong Seong-chan
- (South Korea) Oh Chan-yeong
- (Chinese Taipei) Wu Tung-lin

The following player received entry into the singles main draw using a protected ranking:

- (United Kingdom) Alexander Ward

The following player received entry into the singles main draw as an alternate:

- (United States) Sekou Bangoura

The following players received entry from the qualifying draw:

- (United Kingdom) Liam Broady
- (United Kingdom) Edward Corrie
- (United States) Austin Krajicek
- (United States) Raymond Sarmiento

== Champions ==
=== Singles ===
- (Canada) Vasek Pospisil def. (Japan) Go Soeda 6–1, 6–2.

=== Doubles ===
- (Chinese Taipei) Hsieh Cheng-peng / (Chinese Taipei) Peng Hsien-yin def. (Thailand) Sanchai Ratiwatana / (Thailand) Sonchat Ratiwatana 7–5, 4–6, [10–8].
