= 2011 Busan Open Challenger Tennis =

- Date: 9–15 May
- Edition: 9th
- Surface: Hard
- Location: Busan, South Korea

Champions

Singles
- (Israel) Dudi Sela

Doubles
- (South Korea) Im Kyu-tae / (Thailand) Danai Udomchoke
- Busan Open Challenger Tennis

The 2011 Busan Open Challenger Tennis was a professional tennis tournament played on hard courts. It was the ninth edition of the tournament which was part of the 2011 ATP Challenger Tour. It took place in Busan, South Korea between 9 and 15 May 2011.

== Singles main-draw entrants ==
=== Seeds ===
Country	Player	Rank^{1}	Seed
TPE	Lu Yen-Hsun	55	1
JPN	Go Soeda	117	2
JPN	Tatsuma Ito	130	3
ISR	Dudi Sela	139	4
AUS	Matthew Ebden	184	5
JPN	Yūichi Sugita	206	6
THA	Danai Udomchoke	241	7
GER	Andre Begemann	255	8

- Rankings are as of May 2, 2011.

=== Other entrants ===
The following players received wildcards into the singles main draw:

- (South Korea) Jeong Suk-young
- (South Korea) Kim Hyun-joon
- (Chinese Taipei) Lu Yen-hsun
- (South Korea) Nam Ji-sung

The following players received entry from the qualifying draw:

- (South Korea) An Jae-sung
- (Russia) Mikhail Ledovskikh
- (Japan) Toshihide Matsui
- (Japan) Takao Suzuki

== Champions ==
=== Singles ===
(Israel) Dudi Sela def. (Japan) Tatsuma Ito, 6–2, 6–7(5), 6–3

=== Doubles ===
(South Korea) Im Kyu-tae / (Thailand) Danai Udomchoke def. (United Kingdom) Jamie Baker / (Canada) Vasek Pospisil, 6–4, 6–4
