= 2015 Busan Open =

- Date: 4–10 May
- Edition: 14th
- Draw: 32S / 16D
- Prize money: $100,000+H
- Surface: Hard
- Location: Busan, South Korea

Champions

Singles
- (South Korea) Chung Hyeon

Doubles
- (Thailand) Sanchai Ratiwatana / (Thailand) Sonchat Ratiwatana
← 2014 ·	Busan Open	· 2016 →

The 2015 Busan Open was a professional tennis tournament played on hard courts. It was the fourteenth edition of the tournament which was part of the 2015 ATP Challenger Tour. It took place in Busan, South Korea between 4 and 10 May 2015.

== Singles main-draw entrants ==
=== Seeds ===
Country	Player	Rank^{1}	Seed
TPE	Lu Yen-hsun	67	1
AUS	Sam Groth	85	2
JPN	Go Soeda	87	3
KOR	Chung Hyeon	88	4
ISR	Dudi Sela	90	5
JPN	Tatsuma Ito	97	6
SVK	Lukáš Lacko	99	7
USA	Ryan Harrison	122	8

* ^{1} Rankings are as of April 27, 2015.

=== Other entrants ===
The following players received wildcards into the singles main draw:

- (South Korea) Hong Seong-chan
- (South Korea) Lim Yong-kyu
- (South Korea) Nam Ji-sung
- (South Korea) Oh Chan-yeong

The following players were given special exempt to gain entry into the singles main draw:

- (Slovenia) Grega Žemlja
- (Croatia) Franco Škugor

The following players received entry from the qualifying draw:

- (United States) Jason Jung
- (Denmark) Frederik Nielsen
- (Bulgaria) Dimitar Kutrovsky
- (South Korea) Kim Young-seok

The following player received entry from as a lucky loser:

- (Australia) Matthew Barton

== Doubles main-draw entrants ==
=== Seeds ===
Country	Player	Country	Player	Rank^{1}	Seed
CHN	Gong Maoxin	TPE	Peng Hsien-yin	210	1
USA	James Cerretani	AUS	Andrew Whittington	258	2
AUS	John-Patrick Smith	AUS	Jordan Thompson	324	3
THA	Sanchai Ratiwatana	THA	Sonchat Ratiwatana	327	4

- ^{1} Rankings as of April 27, 2015.

=== Other entrants ===
The following pairs received wildcards into the singles main draw:

- (South Korea) Chung Hyeon / (South Korea) Lim Yong-kyu
- (South Korea) Nam Ji-sung / (South Korea) Song Min-kyu
- (South Korea) Chung Yun-seong / (South Korea) Hong Seong-chan

== Champions ==
=== Singles ===
- (South Korea) Chung Hyeon def. (Slovakia) Lukáš Lacko 6–3, 6–1

=== Doubles ===
- (Thailand) Sanchai Ratiwatana / (Thailand) Sonchat Ratiwatana def. (South Korea) Nam Ji-sung / (South Korea) Song Min-kyu 7–6^{(7–2)}, 3–6, [10–7]
