= Na Jung-woong =

South Korean tennis player

Na Jung-woong 나정웅
- Country (sports): South Korea
- Born: 31 October 1992 (age 32)
- Prize money: $47,400

Singles
- Career record: 0–1 (at ATP Tour level, Grand Slam level, and in Davis Cup)
- Career titles: 1 ITF
- Highest ranking: No. 404 (16 September 2013)

Doubles
- Career record: 0–0 (at ATP Tour level, Grand Slam level, and in Davis Cup)
- Career titles: 0 ITF
- Highest ranking: No. 966 (19 May 2014)
- Last updated on: 15:11, 3 July 2019 (UTC).

- Na Jung-woong
- Hangul: 나정웅
- RR: Na Jeongung
- MR: Na Chŏngung

Na Jung-woong (Korean: 나정웅; born 31 October 1992) is a South Korean tennis player.

== Career ==
Na has a career high ATP singles ranking of 404 achieved on 16 September 2013. He also has a career high ATP doubles ranking of 966, achieved on 19 May 2014. He represents South Korea at the Davis Cup, where he has a W/L record of 0–1.

== Challengers and Futures finals ==
=== Singles (1–5) ===
Legend ATP Challenger Tour (0–0) ITF Tour (1–5)	Titles by surface Hard (1–4) Clay (0–1) Grass (0–0)

Outcome	Date	Tournament	Surface	Opponent	Score
Runner-up	5 May 2013	Seoul, South Korea	Hard	(United States) Daniel Nguyen	1–6, 4–6
Runner-up	24 November 2013	Bhopal, India	Hard	(India) Sriram Balaji	5–7, 5–7
Winner	16 August 2015	Gimcheon, South Korea	Hard	(South Korea) Chung Yun-seong	6–3, 6–1
Runner-up	23 August 2015	Gimcheon, South Korea	Hard	(Japan) Yusuke Watanuki	5–7, 3–6
Runner-up	6 September 2015	Anseong, South Korea	Clay	(South Korea) Cho Min-hyeok	7–6, 2–6, 4–6
Runner-up	9 June 2019	Daegu, South Korea	Hard	(South Korea) Hong Seong-chan	0–6, 3–6

=== Doubles (0–1) ===
Legend ATP Challenger Tour (0–0) ITF Tour (0–1)	Titles by surface Hard (0–0) Clay (0–1) Grass (0–0)

Outcome	Date	Tournament	Surface	Partner	Opponent	Score
Runner-up	25 January 2015	Cairo, Egypt	Clay	(South Korea) Yun Jae-won	(France) Maxime Janvier (Poland) Kamil Majchrzak	2–6, 2–6
