= Busan Open =

- 2025 Busan Open

ATP Challenger Tour
- Event name: Busan Open Challenger
- Location: Busan, South Korea
- Venue: Spo 1 Park
- Category: ATP Challenger Tour 125
- Surface: Hard
- Draw: 32S/32Q/16D
- Prize money: US$164,000+H
- Website: Website

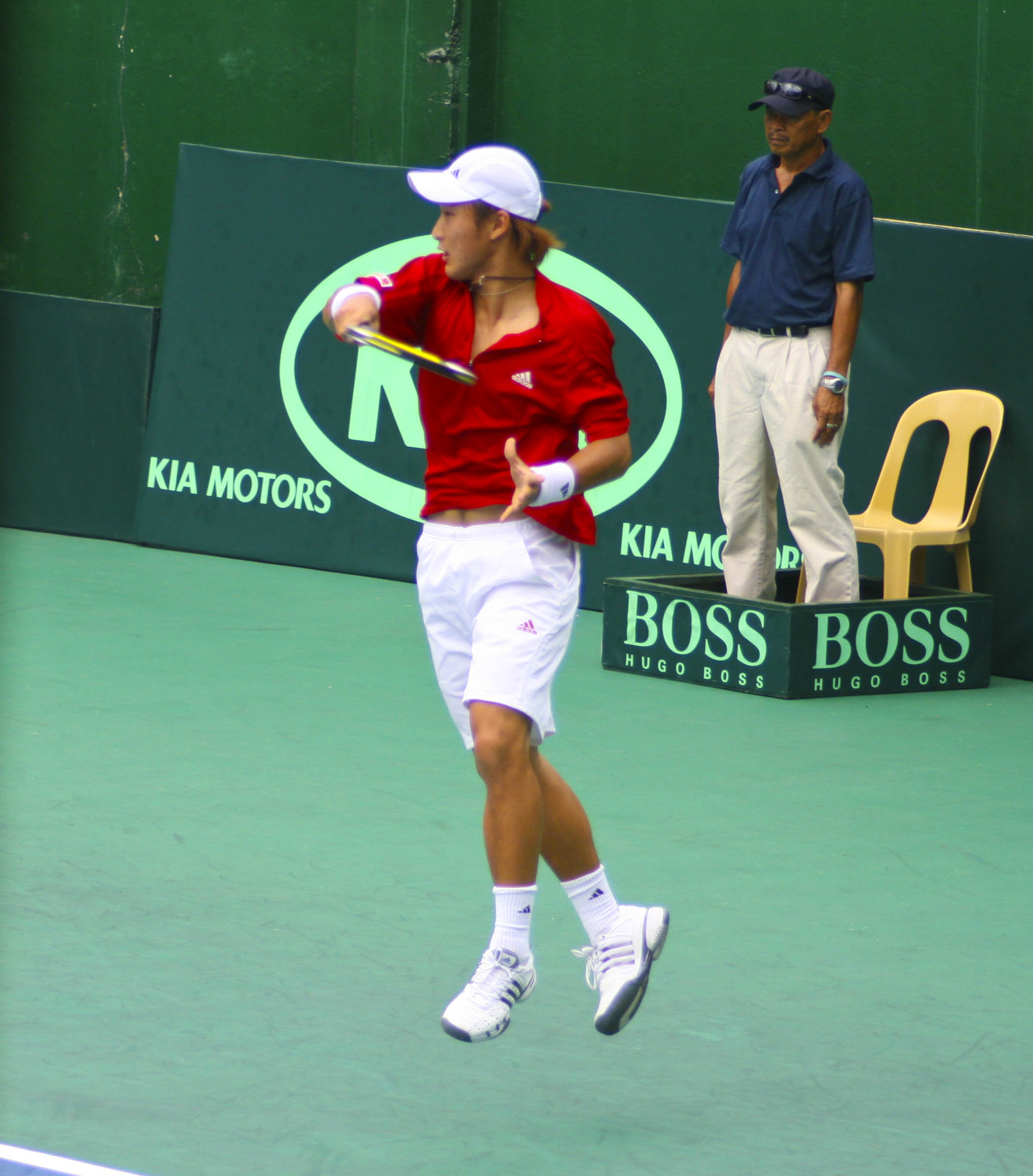
Japan's Go Soeda defeated Lu Yen-hsun, already the 2004 runner-up, in the 2008 Busan singles final

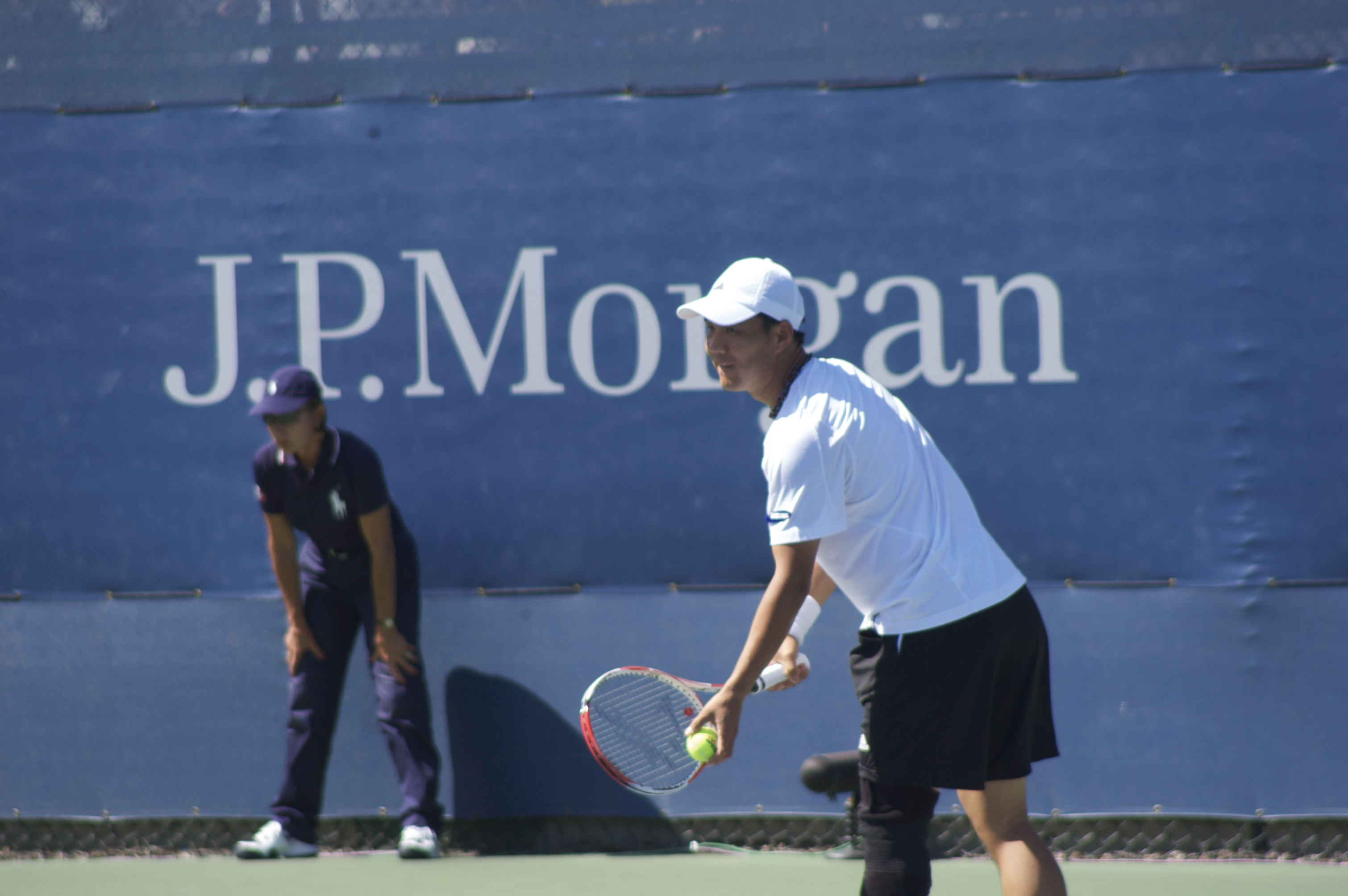
Korean player Lee Hyung-taik beat defending champion Danai Udomchoke to take the singles in 2006

The Busan Open (formerly known as Busan Open Challenger Tennis) is a professional tennis tournament played on outdoor hardcourts. It is currently part of the ATP Challenger Tour 125 and it is the longest-running Challenger event in Asia, established in 2003. It has been held annually in Busan, South Korea, in the spring. In 2022 it was played in October.

== Past finals ==
=== Singles ===
Year	Champion	Runner-up	Score
2026	(Switzerland) Leandro Riedi	(China) Bu Yunchaokete	3–6, 6–3, 6–2
2025	(France) Térence Atmane	(Australia) Adam Walton	6–3, 6–4
2024	(Japan) Yasutaka Uchiyama	(South Korea) Hong Seong-chan	7–6^{(7–4)}, 6–3
2023	(Australia) Aleksandar Vukic	(Australia) Max Purcell	6–4, 1–0 ret.
2022	(Poland) Kamil Majchrzak	(Moldova) Radu Albot	6–4, 3–6, 6–2
2021– 2020	Not held		
2019	(Lithuania) Ričardas Berankis	(Australia) Andrew Harris	7–6^{(7–5)}, 6–2
2018	(Australia) Matthew Ebden	(Canada) Vasek Pospisil	7–6^{(7–4)}, 6–1
2017	(Canada) Vasek Pospisil	(Japan) Go Soeda	6–1, 6–2
2016	(Russia) Konstantin Kravchuk	(United Kingdom) Daniel Evans	6–4, 6–4
2015	(South Korea) Chung Hyeon	(Slovakia) Lukáš Lacko	6–3, 6–1
2014	(Japan) Go Soeda	(Chinese Taipei) Jimmy Wang	6–3, 7–6^{(7–5)}
2013	(Israel) Dudi Sela	(Russia) Alex Bogomolov Jr.	6–1, 6–4
2012	(Japan) Tatsuma Ito	(Australia) John Millman	6–4, 6–3
2011	(Israel) Dudi Sela	(Japan) Tatsuma Ito	6–2, 6–7^{(5–7)}, 6–3
2010	(South Korea) Lim Yong-kyu	(Chinese Taipei) Lu Yen-hsun	6–1, 6–4
2009	(Thailand) Danai Udomchoke	(Slovenia) Blaž Kavčič	6–2, 6–2
2008	(Japan) Go Soeda	(Chinese Taipei) Lu Yen-hsun	6–0, 0–0 retired
2007	(Chinese Taipei) Wang Yeu-tzuoo	(Czech Republic) Jan Vacek	6–3, 6–2
2006	(South Korea) Lee Hyung-taik	(Thailand) Danai Udomchoke	6–3, 6–2
2005	(Thailand) Danai Udomchoke	(United States) Paul Goldstein	7–6^{(8–6)}, 6–1
2004	(Austria) Alexander Peya	(Chinese Taipei) Lu Yen-hsun	6–3, 5–7, 6–3
2003	(South Korea) Kim Young-jun	(Japan) Tasuku Iwami	6–4, 4–1 retired

=== Doubles ===
Year	Champion	Runner-up	Score
2026	(India) Anirudh Chandrasekar (Japan) Takeru Yuzuki	(Netherlands) Jean-Julien Rojer (United States) Theodore Winegar	4–6, 6–3, [10–7]
2025	(Japan) Rio Noguchi (Japan) Yuta Shimizu	(Chinese Taipei) Ray Ho (Australia) Matthew Romios	7–6^{(9–7)}, 6–4
2024	(Chinese Taipei) Ray Ho (South Korea) Nam Ji-sung	(South Korea) Chung Yun-seong (Chinese Taipei) Hsu Yu-hsiou	6–2, 6–4
2023	(United States) Evan King (United States) Reese Stalder	(Australia) Max Purcell (New Zealand) Rubin Statham	walkover
2022	(Australia) Marc Polmans (Australia) Max Purcell	(South Korea) Nam Ji-sung (South Korea) Song Min-kyu	6–7^{(5–7)}, 6–2, [12–10]
2021– 2020	Not held		
2019	(Chinese Taipei) Hsieh Cheng-peng (Indonesia) Christopher Rungkat	(Japan) Toshihide Matsui (India) Vishnu Vardhan	7–6^{(9–7)}, 6–1
2018	(Chinese Taipei) Hsieh Cheng-peng (Indonesia) Christopher Rungkat	(South Africa) Ruan Roelofse (Australia) John-Patrick Smith	6–4, 6–3
2017	(Chinese Taipei) Hsieh Cheng-peng (Chinese Taipei) Peng Hsien-yin	(Thailand) Sanchai Ratiwatana (Thailand) Sonchat Ratiwatana	7–5, 4–6, [10–8]
2016	(Australia) Sam Groth (India) Leander Paes	(Thailand) Sanchai Ratiwatana (Thailand) Sonchat Ratiwatana	4–6, 6–1, [10–7]
2015	(Thailand) Sanchai Ratiwatana (Thailand) Sonchat Ratiwatana	(South Korea) Nam Ji-sung (South Korea) Song Min-kyu	7–6^{(7–2)}, 3–6, [10–7]
2014	(Thailand) Sanchai Ratiwatana (Thailand) Sonchat Ratiwatana	(United Kingdom) Jamie Delgado (Australia) John-Patrick Smith	6–4, 6–4
2013	(Chinese Taipei) Peng Hsien-yin (Chinese Taipei) Yang Tsung-hua	(South Korea) Jeong Suk-young (South Korea) Lim Yong-kyu	6–4, 6–3
2012	(India) Yuki Bhambri (India) Divij Sharan	(Chinese Taipei) Hsieh Cheng-peng (Chinese Taipei) Lee Hsin-han	1–6, 6–1, [10–5]
2011	(South Korea) Im Kyu-tae (Thailand) Danai Udomchoke	(United Kingdom) Jamie Baker (Canada) Vasek Pospisil	6–4, 6–4
2010	(Australia) Rameez Junaid (Austria) Alexander Peya	(Canada) Pierre-Ludovic Duclos (Chinese Taipei) Yang Tsung-hua	6–4, 7–5
2009	(Thailand) Sanchai Ratiwatana (Thailand) Sonchat Ratiwatana	(Japan) Tasuku Iwami (Japan) Toshihide Matsui	6–4, 6–2
2008	(South Africa) Rik de Voest (Poland) Łukasz Kubot	(Australia) Adam Feeney (Australia) Rameez Junaid	6–3, 6–3
2007	(Ukraine) Sergei Bubka (United States) John Paul Fruttero	(Australia) Nathan Healey (Czech Republic) Jan Mertl	4–6, 7–6^{(7–5)}, [10–6]
2006	(United States) Scott Lipsky (United States) Todd Widom	(United States) Robert Kendrick (Philippines) Cecil Mamiit	6–3, 6–7^{(2–7)}, [10–7]
2005	(United States) Paul Goldstein (United States) Rajeev Ram	(United States) Justin Gimelstob (South Africa) Wesley Moodie	walkover
2004	(Thailand) Sanchai Ratiwatana (Thailand) Sonchat Ratiwatana	(Japan) Satoshi Iwabuchi (Japan) Tasuku Iwami	6–7^{(5–7)}, 7–6^{(7–1)}, 6–4
2003	(Japan) Toshihide Matsui (Japan) Michihisa Onoda	(South Korea) Baek Seung-bok (South Korea) Park Seung-kyu	6–1, 6–3
