= 2015 Chang-Sat Bangkok Open – Singles =

Singles
- 2015 Chang-Sat Bangkok Open

Final
- Champion: (Japan) Yūichi Sugita
- Runner-up: (Argentina) Marco Trungelliti
- Score: 6–4, 6–2

Events
Singles	Doubles
← 2014 ·	Chang-Sat Bangkok Open	· 2016 →

Chung Hyeon was the defending champion but chose not to defend his title.
Yūichi Sugita won the title defeating Marco Trungelliti 6–4, 6–2 in the final.

== Seeds ==
1. (Japan) Tatsuma Ito (first round)
2. (India) Somdev Devvarman (quarterfinals)
3. (Japan) Yūichi Sugita (champion)
4. (Belgium) Niels Desein (first round)
5. (Australia) Jordan Thompson (semifinals)
6. (Chinese Taipei) Chen Ti (semifinals)
7. (United States) Alexander Sarkissian (quarterfinals)
8. (Japan) Yasutaka Uchiyama (second round)

== Draw ==
=== Key ===
- Q = Qualifier
- WC = Wild card
- LL = Lucky loser
- Alt = Alternate
- SE = Special exempt
- PR = Protected ranking
- ITF = ITF entry
- JE = Junior exempt
- w/o = Walkover
- r = Retired
- d = Defaulted
- SR = Special ranking

=== Finals ===
Semifinals
5	(Australia) Jordan Thompson	6	6^{2}	0
(Argentina) Marco Trungelliti	4	7^{7}	6
3	(Japan) Yūichi Sugita	6	6
6	(Chinese Taipei) Ti Chen	2	3

Final
(Argentina) Marco Trungelliti	4	2
3	(Japan) Yūichi Sugita	6	6

=== Top half ===
First round
1	(Japan) T Ito	6	2	5
(Australia) B Mitchell	2	6	7
(United States) N Meister	1	6	4
(India) S Balaji	6	1	6
(China) D Wu	4	4
(Australia) Gavin van Peperzeel	6	6
(Russia) D Medvedev	4	4
5	(Australia) J Thompson	6	6
4	(Belgium) N Desein	1	4
Q	(Indonesia) C Rungkat	6	6
(Chinese Taipei) L-c Huang	6	4	3
(Argentina) M Trungelliti	4	6	6
(Japan) Shuichi Sekiguchi	6	7
(Japan) T Niki	2	5
(China) Z Li	1	1
7	(United States) A Sarkissian	6	6

Second round
(Australia) B Mitchell	6^{4}	6	6
(India) S Balaji	7^{7}	2	3
(Australia) G van Peperzeel	1	2
5	(Australia) J Thompson	6	6
Q	(Indonesia) C Rungkat	3	3
(Argentina) M Trungelliti	6	6
(Japan) S Sekiguchi	5	4
7	(United States) A Sarkissian	7	6

Quarterfinals
(Australia) B Mitchell	2^{r}
5	(Australia) J Thompson	5
(Argentina) M Trungelliti	2	7	6
7	(United States) A Sarkissian	6	5	1

Semifinals
5	(Australia) J Thompson	6	6^{2}	0
(Argentina) M Trungelliti	4	7^{7}	6

=== Bottom half ===
First round
8	(Japan) Y Uchiyama	6	7
(Australia) D Propoggia	4	5
(India) R Ramanathan	3	0
(China) Z Zhang	6	6
WC	(Thailand) K Wachiramanowong	6	6^{4}	6
Q	(New Zealand) F Tearney	3	7^{7}	2
(Chinese Taipei) J Wang	3	3
3	(Japan) Y Sugita	6	6
6	(Chinese Taipei) T Chen	6	7
WC	(Thailand) Phassawit Burapharitta	3	5
(South Korea) D-h Lee	7	6^{2}	4
Q	(Australia) Oliver Anderson	5	7^{7}	6
Q	(Australia) A Whittington	4	7^{7}	6
WC	(Thailand) P Isaro	6	6^{3}	2
WC	(Thailand) Puriwat Chatpatcharoen	4	2
2	(India) S Devvarman	6	6

Second round
8	(Japan) Y Uchiyama	3	6^{3}
(China) Z Zhang	6	7^{7}
(Thailand) K Wachiramanowong	1	2
3	(Japan) Y Sugita	6	6
6	(Chinese Taipei) T Chen	7	6
Q	(Australia) O Anderson	5	4
Q	(Australia) A Whittington	5	2^{r}
2	(India) S Devvarman	7	4

Quarterfinals
(China) Z Zhang	5	6^{2}
3	(Japan) Y Sugita	7	7^{7}
6	(Chinese Taipei) T Chen	0	7	6
2	(India) S Devvarman	6	5	3

Semifinals
3	(Japan) Y Sugita	6	6
6	(Chinese Taipei) T Chen	2	3
