= 2012 US Open Series =

Ninth edition of the tennis tournament series

In tennis, the ninth edition of the US Open Series (known as Emirates Airline US Open Series for sponsorships reasons), included twelve hard court tournaments that started on July 9, 2012 in Stanford and concluded in Winston-Salem for the men and in New Haven for the women on August 26, 2012. This edition scheduled four separate men's tournaments and four women's tournaments – the Citi Open and the Western & Southern Open hosted both a men's and women's event. The series was headlined by two ATP World Tour Masters 1000 and two WTA Premier 5 events. The series winners were Novak Djokovic and Petra Kvitová.

== Point distribution for series events ==
In order to be included in the standings and subsequently the bonus prize money, a player needed to have countable results from two different tournaments. Players who finished in the top three in the series could have earned up to $1 million in extra prize money at the US Open. Roger Federer received the largest US Open pay day of $2.4 million in 2007 after capturing the title in both the US Open Series and the US Open championship.

Round	ATP Masters Series 1000 WTA Premier 5 Series	ATP World Tour 500/250 WTA Premier Series
Champion	100	70
Finalist	70	45
Semifinalist	45	25
Quarterfinalist	25	15
Round of 16	15	0

== US Open Series standings ==
The final standings below include all players who received points in at least two tournaments.

=== ATP ===
Rank	Nation	Player	Tours ^{1}	Titles	Points
1	SRB	Novak Djokovic	2	1	170
3	USA	John Isner	3	1	140
2	USA	Sam Querrey	4	1	135
4	UKR	Alexandr Dolgopolov	2	1	85
5	USA	Mardy Fish	3	-	75
=	CZE	Tomáš Berdych	3	-	75
7	GER	Tommy Haas	2	-	70
8	CAN	Milos Raonic	2	-	50
9	FRA	Jérémy Chardy	2	-	40
=	CRO	Marin Čilić	2	-	40
=	ESP	Marcel Granollers	2	-	40
12	CZE	Radek Štěpánek	2	-	30
=	GBR	Andy Murray	2	-	30
=	USA	Michael Russell	2	-	30
=	BEL	Xavier Malisse	2	-	30

- as of August 25, 2012

Notes:

- 1 – Tours – Number of tournaments in US Open Series in which a player has reached the quarterfinals or better, in 250 and 500 series events or the Round of 16 in ATP World Tour Masters 1000 events.

=== WTA ===
Rank	Nation	Player	Tours ^{1}	Titles	Points
1	CZE	Petra Kvitová	3	2 (1st, 2nd)	215
2	CHN	Li Na	2	1	170
3	SVK	Dominika Cibulková	3	1	100
4	USA	Serena Williams	2	1	95
5	FRA	Marion Bartoli	3	-	90
6	GER	Angelique Kerber	2	-	85
=	DEN	Caroline Wozniacki	3	-	85
8	CZE	Lucie Šafářová	2	-	60
9	ITA	Sara Errani	3	-	55
10	POL	Agnieszka Radwańska	2	-	50
11	POL	Urszula Radwańska	3	-	45
12	AUS	Samantha Stosur	2	-	40
13	USA	Christina McHale	2	-	30
=	USA	Varvara Lepchenko	2	-	30
=	RSA	Chanelle Scheepers	2	-	30

- as of August 25, 2012

Notes:

- 1 – Tours – Number of tournaments in US Open Series in which a player has reached the quarterfinals or better, in Premier events; or the Round of 16 or better in Premier 5 events.

== Bonus Prize Money ==
The US Open series gives bonus money to the top three player in the US Open Series, depending on where they finish in the 2012 US Open (tennis) and where they finish in 2012 US Open Series. The bonus money they receive is

2012 US Open Finish	2012 Emirates Airline US Open Series Finish					
2012 US Open Finish	1st Place		2nd Place		3rd Place	
Champion	$1,000,000		$500,000		$250,000	
Finalist	$500,000		$250,000		$125,000	
Semifinalist	$250,000		$125,000		$62,500	
Quarterfinalist	$125,000		$62,500		$31,250	
Round of 16	$70,000		$35,000		$17,500	
Round of 32	$40,000		$20,000		$10,000	
Round of 64	$25,000		$12,500		$6,250	
Round of 128	$15,000		$7,500		$3,750	
Awardees	(Serbia) Novak Djokovic	$500,000	(United States) John Isner	$20,000	(United States) Sam Querrey	$10,000
Awardees	(Czech Republic) Petra Kvitová	$70,000	(China) Li Na	$20,000	(Slovakia) Dominika Cibulková	$10,000

== 2012 schedule ==
Legend
Grand Slam Event
ATP Masters 1000 and WTA Premier 5
ATP World Tour 500 and WTA Premier
ATP World Tour 250 and WTA International

Week	Date	Men's Events	Women's Events
1	July 9–15	No Series Event Held This Week	Stanford; Bank of the West Classic; 2012 Champion : (United States) Serena Williams
2	July 16–22	Atlanta; BB&T Atlanta Open; 2012 Champion: (United States) Andy Roddick	Carlsbad; Mercury Insurance Open; 2012 Champion: (Slovakia) Dominika Cibulková
3	July 23–29	Los Angeles; Farmers Classic; 2012 Champion: (United States) Sam Querrey	No Series Event Held This Week
4	July 30–Aug 5	Washington, D.C. Citi Open; 2012 Champion: (Ukraine) Alexandr Dolgopolov	Washington, D.C. Citi Open; 2012 Champion: (Slovakia) Magdaléna Rybáriková
5	Aug 6–12	Toronto; Rogers Cup; 2012 Champion: (Serbia) Novak Djokovic	Montreal; Rogers Cup; 2012 Champion: (Czech Republic) Petra Kvitová
6	Aug 13–19	Cincinnati; Western & Southern Open; 2012 Champion: (Switzerland) Roger Federer	Cincinnati; Western & Southern Open; 2012 Champion: (China) Li Na
7	Aug 20–26	Winston-Salem; Winston-Salem Open; 2012 Champion: (United States) John Isner	New Haven; New Haven Open at Yale; 2012 Champion: (Czech Republic) Petra Kvitová
8–9	Aug 27 – Sep 10	New York; US Open; 2012 Champion: (United Kingdom) Andy Murray	New York; US Open; 2012 Champion: (United States) Serena Williams

== Week 1 ==
=== WTA – Bank of the West Classic ===
The defending champion, Serena Williams, and last year's finalist, Marion Bartoli, headlined the event. Playing just in the week after her victories in singles and doubles at Wimbledon, Williams advanced to her fourth final of the season conceding just ten games in total. In the other side of the draw, young American, Coco Vandeweghe, who entered the main draw as a lucky-loser, made an impressive run to the final defeating Jelena Janković and Yanina Wickmayer en route. The final was the first all-American final in the WTA Tour since 2009 WTA Tour Championships, and the first on U.S. soil since the Los Angeles in 2004. In the final, Williams successfully defended her title after defeating Vandeweghe 7–5, 6–3.

==== Main draw finals ====
Quarterfinals
1	(United States) Serena Williams	6	6
6	(South Africa) Chanelle Scheepers	4	0
3	(Slovakia) Dominika Cibulková	7^{7}	2	0
9	(Romania) Sorana Cîrstea	6^{5}	6	6
(Poland) Urszula Radwańska	4	4
LL	(United States) Coco Vandeweghe	6	6
5	(Belgium) Yanina Wickmayer	6	6
2	(France) Marion Bartoli	3	2

Semifinals
1	(United States) Serena Williams	6	6
9	(Romania) Sorana Cîrstea	1	2
LL	(United States) Coco Vandeweghe	6	3	6
5	(Belgium) Yanina Wickmayer	2	6	2

Final
1	(United States) Serena Williams	7	6
LL	(United States) Coco Vandeweghe	5	3

== Week 2 ==
=== ATP – BB&T Atlanta Open ===
The three highest-ranked American, John Isner, Mardy Fish, and Andy Roddick headlined the event. Roddick advanced to his second final appearance of the season after a close-fight semifinals encounter against Isner, in which he won in three sets. Gilles Müller of Luxembourg, who was trailing 4–6, 2–3 in his second round match against Fish before Fish retired, advanced to his third ATP final appearance in his career. In the final, Roddick claimed his 32nd career title after defeating Müller 1–6, 7–6^{(7–2)}, 6–2.

==== Main draw finals ====
Quarterfinals
1	(United States) John Isner	7^{9}	6
WC	(United States) Jack Sock	6^{7}	4
4	(United States) Andy Roddick	6	6
(United States) Michael Russell	3	4
8	(Japan) Go Soeda	6	6
3	(Japan) Kei Nishikori	2	1
(Australia) Matthew Ebden	4	4
(Luxembourg) Gilles Müller	6	6

Semifinals
1	(United States) John Isner	4	7^{7}	4
4	(United States) Andy Roddick	6	6^{5}	6
8	(Japan) Go Soeda	4	3
(Luxembourg) Gilles Müller	6	6

Final
4	(United States) Andy Roddick	1	7^{7}	6
(Luxembourg) Gilles Müller	6	6^{2}	2

=== WTA – Mercury Insurance Open ===
Marion Bartoli, Dominika Cibulková, and Jelena Janković headlined the event. As a qualifier, Chan Yung-jan upset the third seeded Janković in three tight sets in the quarterfinals which lasted for more than three hours with score 6–7^{(4–7)},7–6^{(10–8)}, 7–5. First seeded Bartoli battled her way to the final by winning all her three matches en route in three sets. Second seeded Cibulková cruised to the final as well, setting up for the fourth time in 2012 where the first seed met the second seed in the final of a WTA tournament. Cibulková went on to win the title in straight sets, after defeating Bartoli 6–1, 7–5.

==== Main draw finals ====
Quarterfinals
1	(France) Marion Bartoli	7	4	6
5	(United States) Christina McHale	5	6	4
3	(Serbia) Jelena Janković	7^{7}	6^{8}	5
Q	(Chinese Taipei) Chan Yung-jan	6^{4}	7^{10}	7
(United States) Varvara Lepchenko	4	6	6^{5}
4	(Russia) Nadia Petrova	6	2	7^{7}
(Poland) Urszula Radwańska	4	4
2	(Slovakia) Dominika Cibulková	6	6

Semifinals
1	(France) Marion Bartoli	1	6	6
Q	(Chinese Taipei) Chan Yung-jan	6	3	3
4	(Russia) Nadia Petrova	6^{8}	1
2	(Slovakia) Dominika Cibulková	7^{10}	6

Final
1	(France) Marion Bartoli	1	5
2	(Slovakia) Dominika Cibulková	6	7

== Week 3 ==
=== ATP – Farmers Classic ===
Benoît Paire, Sam Querrey, Leonardo Mayer, and Nicolas Mahut headlined the event. Coming from the qualifying stage of the tournament, Ričardas Berankis reached the final after taking down the fourth-seeded Mahut and sixth-seeded Marinko Matosevic in the quarterfinals and semifinals respectively. Having won the tournament twice in 2009 and 2010, Querrey cruised through to his first final appearance since winning the title in 2010. He went on crushing Berankis 6–0, 6–2 for his seventh singles title.

==== Main draw finals ====
Quarterfinals
(United States) Michael Russell	2	3
6	(New Zealand) Marinko Matosevic	6	6
4	(France) Nicolas Mahut	4	4
Q	(Lithuania) Ričardas Berankis	6	6
(United States) Rajeev Ram	7^{7}	6
3	(Argentina) Leonardo Mayer	6^{3}	3
5	(Belgium) Xavier Malisse	2	1^{r}
2	(United States) Sam Querrey	6	3

Semifinals
6	(New Zealand) Marinko Matosevic	5	1
Q	(Lithuania) Ričardas Berankis	7	6
(United States) Rajeev Ram	3	6^{4}
2	(United States) Sam Querrey	6	7^{7}

Final
Q	(Lithuania) Ričardas Berankis	0	2
2	(United States) Sam Querrey	6	6

== Week 4 ==
=== ATP – Citi Open ===
Being held concurrently with the 2012 Summer Olympics, the event was headlined by Mardy Fish, Alexandr Dolgopolov, Kevin Anderson, Tommy Haas, and Los Angeles champion, Sam Querrey. Third-seeded Haas reached his third final appearance of the season after defeating top-seeded Fish in the semifinals in straight sets. Second-seeded Dolgopolov also reached the final after beating Querrey in the semifinals as well. Dolgopolov ended up winning his second career title after defeating Haas 6–7^{(7–9)}, 6–4, 6–1 in the final.

==== Main draw finals ====
Quarterfinals
1	(United States) Mardy Fish	6	6
(Belgium) Xavier Malisse	3	4
4	(Germany) Tommy Haas	6	6
(Germany) Tobias Kamke	1	2
8	(United States) Sam Querrey	6	6
3	(South Africa) Kevin Anderson	4	4
(United States) James Blake	6^{3}	4
2	(Ukraine) Alexandr Dolgopolov	7^{7}	6

Semifinals
1	(United States) Mardy Fish	3	5
4	(Germany) Tommy Haas	6	7
8	(United States) Sam Querrey	4	4
2	(Ukraine) Alexandr Dolgopolov	6	6

Final
4	(Germany) Tommy Haas	7^{9}	4	1
2	(Ukraine) Alexandr Dolgopolov	6^{7}	6	6

=== WTA – Citi Open ===
Being held in the same week as the Summer Olympics, the event was headlined by players who missed the Olympics' qualification. The pack of players was led by first seeded Anastasia Pavlyuchenkova, second seeded Chanelle Scheepers, and third seeded Sloane Stephens. As an unseeded player, Magdaléna Rybáriková defeated these top three seeds to win her third WTA title after defeating Pavlyuchenkova 6–1, 6–1 in the final.

As an International level tournament, the event did not award any points toward the US Open Series standings.

==== Main draw finals ====
Quarterfinals
1	(Russia) Anastasia Pavlyuchenkova	6	6
(Chinese Taipei) Chang Kai-chen	4	4
4	(United States) Vania King	6	3	6
7/WC	(United States) Coco Vandeweghe	1	6	4
WC	(Canada) Eugenie Bouchard	4	4
3	(United States) Sloane Stephens	6	6
Q	(Slovakia) Jana Čepelová	2	4
(Slovakia) Magdaléna Rybáriková	6	6

Semifinals
1	(Russia) Anastasia Pavlyuchenkova	4	7	6
4	(United States) Vania King	6	5	4
3	(United States) Sloane Stephens	3	3
(Slovakia) Magdaléna Rybáriková	6	6

Final
1	(Russia) Anastasia Pavlyuchenkova	1	1
(Slovakia) Magdaléna Rybáriková	6	6

== Week 5 ==
=== ATP – Rogers Cup (Toronto) ===
Seven of the world top 10 players headlined the event, with world no.2 and defending champion, Novak Djokovic, recent Olympics gold medalist, Andy Murray led the pack. Just one week after his loss at the Olympics, Djokovic reached his sixth final appearance of the season. Murray withdrew in the third round due to knee injury. Fourteenth-seeded Richard Gasquet beat the likes of fourth-seeded Tomáš Berdych and the top two American players, Mardy Fish and John Isner, to advance to his second final appearance of the season. Djokovic won the final comfortably by 6–3, 6–2 to earn his third title of the season.

==== Main draw finals ====
Third round
1	(Serbia) Novak Djokovic	6	6
SE	(United States) Sam Querrey	4	4
(Germany) Tommy Haas	2	6	6
(Czech Republic) Radek Štěpánek	6	4	1
(France) Jérémy Chardy	1	4
(Spain) Marcel Granollers	6	6
10	(Croatia) Marin Čilić	2	4
5	(Serbia) Janko Tipsarević	6	6
7	(Argentina) Juan Mónaco	6	1	4
11	(United States) Mardy Fish	2	6	6
14	(France) Richard Gasquet	6	6
4	(Czech Republic) Tomáš Berdych	4	2
8	(United States) John Isner	6^{3}	6	6
12	(Germany) Philipp Kohlschreiber	7^{7}	4	4
16	(Canada) Milos Raonic	w/o
2	(United Kingdom) Andy Murray

Quarterfinals
1	(Serbia) Novak Djokovic	6	3	6
(Germany) Tommy Haas	3	6	3
(Spain) Marcel Granollers	4	4
5	(Serbia) Janko Tipsarević	6	6
11	(United States) Mardy Fish	7	1	2
14	(France) Richard Gasquet	5	6	6
8	(United States) John Isner	7^{11}	6
16	(Canada) Milos Raonic	6^{9}	4

Semifinals
1	(Serbia) Novak Djokovic	6	6
5	(Serbia) Janko Tipsarević	4	1
14	(France) Richard Gasquet	7^{7}	6
8	(United States) John Isner	6^{3}	3

Final
1	(Serbia) Novak Djokovic	6	6
14	(France) Richard Gasquet	3	2

=== WTA – Rogers Cup (Montreal) ===
Nine of the world top 10 players headlined the event, with Victoria Azarenka, Agnieszka Radwańska, and Maria Sharapova led the field. Radwańska had a chance to become the world no.1 after the conclusion of the tournament. The event's schedule was heavily disturbed with rain, causing the final to be played on Monday, August 13. World no. 6, Petra Kvitová advanced to her first final appearance of the season after defeating Caroline Wozniacki in the semifinals. In the other side of the draw, Li Na erased Radwańska's chance of overtaking the world no.1 title after defeating her in the quarterfinals. Li eventually advanced to the final after defeating Lucie Šafářová in a tightly-contested semifinals, having to trail from 1–5 in the third set. Kvitová ended up winning the title after defeating Li 7–5, 2–6, 6–3 in the Monday final, for her first title in 2012.

==== Main draw finals ====
Third round
(Austria) Tamira Paszek	6	6
(Spain) Carla Suárez Navarro	3	0
9	(France) Marion Bartoli	1	1
5	(Czech Republic) Petra Kvitová	6	6
(United States) Christina McHale	6^{5}	3
WC	(Canada) Aleksandra Wozniak	7^{7}	6
(United States) Varvara Lepchenko	6	3	4
7	(Denmark) Caroline Wozniacki	4	6	6
6	(Germany) Angelique Kerber	2	6^{7}
(Italy) Roberta Vinci	6	7^{9}
16	(Czech Republic) Lucie Šafářová	7^{11}	7^{7}
4	(Australia) Samantha Stosur	6^{9}	6^{5}
8	(Italy) Sara Errani	4	2
10	(China) Li Na	6	6
(South Africa) Chanelle Scheepers	2	4
2	(Poland) Agnieszka Radwańska	6	6

Quarterfinals
(Austria) Tamira Paszek	3	2
5	(Czech Republic) Petra Kvitová	6	6
WC	(Canada) Aleksandra Wozniak	4	4
7	(Denmark) Caroline Wozniacki	6	6
(Italy) Roberta Vinci	2	2
16	(Czech Republic) Lucie Šafářová	6	6
10	(China) Li Na	6	6
2	(Poland) Agnieszka Radwańska	2	1

Semifinals
5	(Czech Republic) Petra Kvitová	3	6	6
7	(Denmark) Caroline Wozniacki	6	2	3
16	(Czech Republic) Lucie Šafářová	6	3	5
10	(China) Li Na	3	6	7

Final
5	(Czech Republic) Petra Kvitová	7	2	6
10	(China) Li Na	5	6	3

== Week 6 ==
=== ATP – Western & Southern Open ===
Eight of the world top 10 players entered the tournament, with the pack headlined by three of the top four players: world no.1, Roger Federer, reigning US Open Champion, Novak Djokovic, and the defending champion, Andy Murray. Playing in his first tournament since the final of the Olympics, Federer reached the final of the tournament which ensured his position as the no.1 seed in the upcoming US Open. Murray lost in the third round to lucky loser, Jérémy Chardy and Djokovic advanced to the final from the opposite half of the draw after defeating Juan Martín del Potro in the semifinals. Federer ended up winning his 76th title after defeating Djokovic 6–0, 7–6^{(9–7)}.

==== Main draw finals ====
Third round
1	(Switzerland) Roger Federer	6	6
(Australia) Bernard Tomic	2	4
10	(United States) Mardy Fish	6	6
(Czech Republic) Radek Štěpánek	3	3
(Switzerland) Stanislas Wawrinka	6	6
14	(Japan) Kei Nishikori	3	3
(Canada) Milos Raonic	6	2	6
5	(Czech Republic) Tomáš Berdych	4	6	2
6	(Argentina) Juan Martín del Potro	7^{7}	2	6
(Serbia) Victor Troicki	6^{2}	6	1
LL	(France) Jérémy Chardy	6	6
3	(United Kingdom) Andy Murray	4	4
(Spain) Pablo Andújar	6^{4}	2
12	(Croatia) Marin Čilić	7^{7}	6
(Russia) Nikolay Davydenko	0^{r}
2	(Serbia) Novak Djokovic	6

Quarterfinals
1	(Switzerland) Roger Federer	6	7^{7}
10	(United States) Mardy Fish	3	6^{4}
(Switzerland) Stanislas Wawrinka	2	7^{7}	6
(Canada) Milos Raonic	6	6^{5}	4
6	(Argentina) Juan Martín del Potro	6	6
LL	(France) Jérémy Chardy	1	3
12	(Croatia) Marin Čilić	3	2
2	(Serbia) Novak Djokovic	6	6

Semifinals
1	(Switzerland) Roger Federer	7^{7}	6
(Switzerland) Stanislas Wawrinka	6^{4}	3
6	(Argentina) Juan Martín del Potro	3	2
2	(Serbia) Novak Djokovic	6	6

Final
1	(Switzerland) Roger Federer	6	7^{9}
2	(Serbia) Novak Djokovic	0	6^{7}

=== WTA – Western & Southern Open ===
Eight of the world top 10 players entered the tournament, with the pack led by Serena Williams, Agnieszka Radwańska, and recent Montreal champion, Petra Kvitová. Williams' older sister, Venus Williams, who entered the tournament with a wild card, had a breakthrough week where she reached her first semifinals appearance since the 2010 US Open after displaying some of her vintage form when defeating Sara Errani and Samantha Stosur. Montreal runner-up, Li Na, defeated Radwańska and Venus Williams to advance to her second consecutive final appearance. In the bottom half of the draw, Angelique Kerber defeated Serena Williams and Kvitová to reach her fourth final appearance of the year, bidding for the biggest title of her career. Li started slowly in the final before regrouping and won her sixth career title after defeating Kerber 1–6, 6–4, 6–1.

==== Main draw finals ====
Third round
1	(Poland) Agnieszka Radwańska	6	4	6
WC	(United States) Sloane Stephens	1	6	4
9	(China) Li Na	6	6
Q	(Sweden) Johanna Larsson	2	2
3	(Australia) Samantha Stosur	6	6
(Russia) Ekaterina Makarova	1	3
WC	(United States) Venus Williams	6	6
7	(Italy) Sara Errani	3	0
6	(Denmark) Caroline Wozniacki	4	4
17	(Russia) Anastasia Pavlyuchenkova	6	6
(China) Peng Shuai	2	2
4	(Czech Republic) Petra Kvitová	6	6
5	(Germany) Angelique Kerber	6	7^{7}
Q	(Czech Republic) Andrea Hlaváčková	4	6^{5}
Q	(Poland) Urszula Radwańska	4	3
2	(United States) Serena Williams	6	6

Quarterfinals
1	(Poland) Agnieszka Radwańska	1	1
9	(China) Li Na	6	6
3	(Australia) Samantha Stosur	2	7^{7}	4
WC	(United States) Venus Williams	6	6^{2}	6
17	(Russia) Anastasia Pavlyuchenkova	3	6^{4}
4	(Czech Republic) Petra Kvitová	6	7^{7}
10	(Germany) Angelique Kerber	6	6
2	(United States) Serena Williams	4	4

Semifinals
9	(China) Li Na	7	3	6
WC	(United States) Venus Williams	5	6	1
4	(Czech Republic) Petra Kvitová	1	6	4
5	(Germany) Angelique Kerber	6	2	6

Final
9	(China) Li Na	1	6	6
5	(Germany) Angelique Kerber	6	3	1

== Week 7 ==
=== ATP – Winston-Salem Open ===
Jo-Wilfried Tsonga, Tomáš Berdych, and the defending champion, John Isner, headlined the event. Tsonga and Isner faced each other in the semifinals where Isner won through a third-set tiebreak. Berdych also advanced to the final for his third final appearance of the season. Isner successfully defended his title after defeating Berdych in a close-fought final by 3–6, 6–4, 7–6^{(11–9)}, thus clinching his second singles title of the season and fifth overall.

==== Main draw finals ====
Quarterfinals
1	(France) Jo-Wilfried Tsonga	6	6
6	(Spain) Marcel Granollers	1	2
3	(United States) John Isner	7^{7}	6
(Belgium) David Goffin	6^{5}	3
7	(United States) Sam Querrey	7	4	7^{7}
4	(Ukraine) Alexandr Dolgopolov	5	6	6^{3}
(Belgium) Steve Darcis	6	2	0
2/WC	(Czech Republic) Tomáš Berdych	4	6	6

Semifinals
1	(France) Jo-Wilfried Tsonga	4	6	6^{3}
3	(United States) John Isner	6	3	7^{7}
7	(United States) Sam Querrey	4	3
2/WC	(Czech Republic) Tomáš Berdych	6	6

Final
3	(United States) John Isner	3	6	7^{11}
2/WC	(Czech Republic) Tomáš Berdych	6	4	6^{9}

=== WTA – New Haven Open at Yale ===
Agnieszka Radwańska, Petra Kvitová, and the defending champion, Caroline Wozniacki headlined the event. Wozniacki was bidding for her fifth straight title at the event. However, she had to retire in her semifinals match due to a nagging knee injury. Radwańska also retired in the second round due to a nagging shoulder injury. Seventh seeded Maria Kirilenko advanced to the final for her second final appearance of the season where she would face Kvitová who cruised comfortably to the final. By winning her quarterfinals match, Kvitová clinched the US Open Series title. Eventually, Kvitová won the final 7–6^{(11–9)}, 7–5 for her second title of the year.

==== Main draw finals ====
Quarterfinals
Q	(Belarus) Olga Govortsova	1	2
7	(Russia) Maria Kirilenko	6	6
3	(Denmark) Caroline Wozniacki	6	6
6	(Slovakia) Dominika Cibulková	2	1
5	(France) Marion Bartoli	4	2
4	(Italy) Sara Errani	6	6
8	(Czech Republic) Lucie Šafářová	3	3
2/WC	(Czech Republic) Petra Kvitová	6	6

Semifinals
7	(Russia) Maria Kirilenko	7
3	(Denmark) Caroline Wozniacki	5^{r}
4	(Italy) Sara Errani	1	3
2/WC	(Czech Republic) Petra Kvitová	6	6

Final
7	(Russia) Maria Kirilenko	6^{9}	5
2/WC	(Czech Republic) Petra Kvitová	7^{11}	7
