= 2010 Farmers Classic – Doubles =

Doubles
- 2010 Farmers Classic

Final
- Champions: (United States) Bob Bryan (United States) Mike Bryan
- Runners-up: (United States) Eric Butorac (Netherlands Antilles) Jean-Julien Rojer
- Score: 6–7^{(6–8)}, 6–2, [10–7]

Details
- Draw: 16
- Seeds: 4

Events
Singles	Doubles
← 2009 ·	Los Angeles Open	· 2011 →

Bob and Mike Bryan successfully defended their title, defeating Eric Butorac and Jean-Julien Rojer in the finals 6–7^{(6–8)}, 6–2, [10–7]. The twin brothers set a record of 62 career doubles titles on the ATP Tour, surpassing The Woodies (Todd Woodbridge and Mark Woodforde). Rojer, who was a UCLA tennis player (1999-2002), returned to play on his college home court.

== Seeds ==
1. (United States) Bob Bryan / (United States) Mike Bryan (champions)
2. (Sweden) Robert Lindstedt / (Romania) Horia Tecău (quarterfinals)
3. (Czech Republic) Martin Damm / (Germany) Michael Kohlmann (first round)
4. (India) Rohan Bopanna / (Pakistan) Aisam-ul-Haq Qureshi (semifinals)

== Draw ==
=== Key ===
- Q = Qualifier
- WC = Wild card
- LL = Lucky loser
- Alt = Alternate
- SE = Special exempt
- PR = Protected ranking
- ITF = ITF entry
- JE = Junior exempt
- w/o = Walkover
- r = Retired
- d = Defaulted
- SR = Special ranking

=== Draw ===
First round
1	(United States) B Bryan (United States) M Bryan	6	6
(United States) M Fish (The Bahamas) M Knowles	3	4
(Latvia) E Gulbis (Russia) D Tursunov	6	3	[11]
(Mexico) S González (United States) T Rettenmaier	3	6	[9]
4	(India) R Bopanna (Pakistan) A-u-H Qureshi	6^{3}	6	[10]
(United Kingdom) C Fleming (United Kingdom) K Skupski	7^{7}	0	[7]
(France) A Clément (Israel) J Erlich	7^{10}	6
(United States) T Parrott (Serbia) D Vemić	6^{8}	2
WC	(United States) J Blake (United States) S Querrey	3	3
(Spain) F López (Serbia) J Tipsarević	6	6
(United Kingdom) R Hutchins (Australia) J Kerr	6	6
3	(Czech Republic) M Damm (Germany) M Kohlmann	3	3
WC	(Australia) C Ball (Australia) C Guccione	3	7^{7}	[6]
(United States) E Butorac (Netherlands Antilles) J-J Rojer	6	6^{4}	[10]
(Brazil) A Sá (Argentina) H Zeballos	6^{2}	1
2	(Sweden) R Lindstedt (Romania) H Tecău	7^{7}	6

Quarterfinals
1	(United States) B Bryan (United States) M Bryan	7	6
(Latvia) E Gulbis (Russia) D Tursunov	5	3
4	(India) R Bopanna (Pakistan) A-u-H Qureshi	3	7^{7}	[14]
(France) A Clément (Israel) J Erlich	6	6^{4}	[12]
(Spain) F López (Serbia) J Tipsarević	6^{2}	6^{5}
(United Kingdom) R Hutchins (Australia) J Kerr	7^{7}	7^{7}
(United States) E Butorac (Netherlands Antilles) J-J Rojer	6	4	[10]
2	(Sweden) R Lindstedt (Romania) H Tecău	3	6	[6]

Semifinals
1	(United States) B Bryan (United States) M Bryan	6	6
4	(India) R Bopanna (Pakistan) A-u-H Qureshi	2	4
(United Kingdom) R Hutchins (Australia) J Kerr	3	2
(United States) E Butorac (Netherlands Antilles) J-J Rojer	6	6

Finals
1	(United States) B Bryan (United States) M Bryan	6^{6}	6	[10]
(United States) E Butorac (Netherlands Antilles) J-J Rojer	7^{8}	2	[7]
