= 2015 Chang-Sat Bangkok Open – Doubles =

Doubles
- 2015 Chang-Sat Bangkok Open

Final
- Champions: (China) Bai Yan (Italy) Riccardo Ghedin
- Runners-up: (Chinese Taipei) Chen Ti (China) Li Zhe
- Score: 6–2, 7–5

Events
Singles	Doubles
← 2014 ·	Chang-Sat Bangkok Open	· 2016 →

Pruchya Isaro and Nuttanon Kadchapanan were the defending champions, but lost in the first round to Niels Desein and Gavin van Peperzeel.
Bai Yan and Riccardo Ghedin won the title, defeating Chen Ti and Li Zhe 6–2, 7–5.

== Seeds ==
1. (Thailand) Sanchai Ratiwatana / (Thailand) Sonchat Ratiwatana (semifinals)
2. (Chinese Taipei) Peng Hsien-yin / (Japan) Yasutaka Uchiyama (first round)
3. (India) Sriram Balaji / (India) Divij Sharan (withdrew)
4. (Chinese Taipei) Chen Ti / (China) Li Zhe (final)

== Draw ==
=== Key ===
- Q = Qualifier
- WC = Wild card
- LL = Lucky loser
- Alt = Alternate
- SE = Special exempt
- PR = Protected ranking
- ITF = ITF entry
- JE = Junior exempt
- w/o = Walkover
- r = Retired
- d = Defaulted
- SR = Special ranking

First round
1	(Thailand) Sa Ratiwatana (Thailand) So Ratiwatana	4	6	[10]
WC	(Thailand) Phassawit Burapharitta (Thailand) J Navasirisomboon	6	3	[4]
(Australia) D Propoggia (Australia) J Thompson	6	7^{11}
(Republic of Ireland) J Cluskey (India) R Ramanathan	4	6^{9}
Alt	(Chinese Taipei) L-c Huang (China) D Wu	6^{1}	3
(Chinese Taipei) C-p Hsieh (Australia) A Whittington	7^{7}	6
(India) S Devvarman (Chinese Taipei) J Wang	4	3
(China) Y Bai (Italy) R Ghedin	6	6
(Belgium) N Desein (Australia) Gavin van Peperzeel	7^{7}	6
WC	(Thailand) P Isaro (Thailand) N Kadchapanan	6^{2}	4
(Japan) T Ito (Japan) T Matsui	6^{2}	4
4	(Chinese Taipei) T Chen (China) Z Li	7^{7}	6
WC	(Thailand) Congsup Congcar (Thailand) K Wachiramanowong	6^{2}	2
(Mexico) H Hach Verdugo (United States) A Sarkissian	7^{7}	6
(Chinese Taipei) H-h Lee (China) Z Zhang	6	3	[10]
2	(Chinese Taipei) H-y Peng (Japan) Y Uchiyama	3	6	[8]

Quarterfinals
1	(Thailand) Sa Ratiwatana (Thailand) So Ratiwatana	7^{7}	7
(Australia) D Propoggia (Australia) J Thompson	6^{5}	5
(Chinese Taipei) C-p Hsieh (Australia) A Whittington	6^{5}	6	[4]
(China) Y Bai (Italy) R Ghedin	7^{7}	4	[10]
(Belgium) N Desein (Australia) G van Peperzeel
4	(Chinese Taipei) T Chen (China) Z Li	w/o
(Mexico) H Hach Verdugo (United States) A Sarkissian	6	2	[9]
(Chinese Taipei) H-h Lee (China) Z Zhang	3	6	[11]

Semifinals
1	(Thailand) Sa Ratiwatana (Thailand) So Ratiwatana	4	1
(China) Y Bai (Italy) R Ghedin	6	6
4	(Chinese Taipei) T Chen (China) Z Li	6	6
(Chinese Taipei) H-h Lee (China) Z Zhang	2	4

Final
(China) Y Bai (Italy) R Ghedin	6	7
4	(Chinese Taipei) T Chen (China) Z Li	2	5
