= 2016 KPN Bangkok Open – Doubles =

Doubles
- 2016 KPN Bangkok Open

Final
- Champions: (Sweden) Johan Brunström (Sweden) Andreas Siljeström
- Runners-up: (Germany) Gero Kretschmer (Germany) Alexander Satschko
- Score: 6–3, 6–4

Events
Singles	Doubles
← 2015 ·	KPN Bangkok Open	· 2017 →

Bai Yan and Riccardo Ghedin were the defending champions, but chose not to defend their title.
Johan Brunström and Andreas Siljeström won the title after defeating Gero Kretschmer and Alexander Satschko 6–3, 6–4 in the final.

== Seeds ==
1. (Germany) Gero Kretschmer / (Germany) Alexander Satschko (final)
2. (Brazil) Marcelo Demoliner / (Denmark) Frederik Nielsen (quarterfinals)
3. (Serbia) Ilija Bozoljac / (Czech Republic) František Čermák (first round)
4. (United Kingdom) Ken Skupski / (United Kingdom) Neal Skupski (semifinals)

== Draw ==
=== Key ===
- Q = Qualifier
- WC = Wild card
- LL = Lucky loser
- Alt = Alternate
- ITF = ITF entry
- PR = Protected ranking
- SR = Special ranking
- SE = Special exempt
- JE = Junior exempt
- JR = Junior Accelerator Programme entrant
- CO = College Accelerator Programme entrant
- NG = Next Gen Accelerator Program entrant
- w/o = Walkover
- r = Retired
- d = Defaulted

First round
1	(Germany) G Kretschmer (Germany) A Satschko	6	6
WC	(Thailand) J Navasirisomboon (Thailand) K Wachiramanowong	1	2
(Thailand) Sa Ratiwatana (Thailand) So Ratiwatana	4	5
(Japan) T Ito (Czech Republic) A Pavlásek	6	7
3	(Serbia) I Bozoljac (Czech Republic) F Čermák	4	6	[6]
(Croatia) N Mektić (Croatia) A Šančić	6	4	[10]
(Croatia) F Škugor (Japan) G Soeda	6	6
(South Africa) D O'Brien (South Africa) R Roelofse	4	4
(Poland) M Kowalczyk (Croatia) D Marcan	6	6
WC	(Thailand) P Isarow (Thailand) N Kadchapanan	3	3
(India) P Raja (India) D Sharan	3	6^{4}
4	(United Kingdom) K Skupski (United Kingdom) N Skupski	6	7^{7}
WC	(Thailand) Punn Bodhidatta (Thailand) Suthinan Tanthaseraneewat	5	1
(Sweden) J Brunström (Sweden) A Siljeström	7	6
(Belgium) K Coppejans (Netherlands) M Vervoort	3	6^{3}
2	(Brazil) M Demoliner (Denmark) F Nielsen	6	7^{7}

Quarterfinals
1	(Germany) G Kretschmer (Germany) A Satschko	6	3	[10]
(Japan) T Ito (Czech Republic) A Pavlásek	3	6	[3]
(Croatia) N Mektić (Croatia) A Šančić	6	6
(Croatia) F Škugor (Japan) G Soeda	3	2
(Poland) M Kowalczyk (Croatia) D Marcan	3	2
4	(United Kingdom) K Skupski (United Kingdom) N Skupski	6	6
(Sweden) J Brunström (Sweden) A Siljeström	7	7^{7}
2	(Brazil) M Demoliner (Denmark) F Nielsen	5	6^{5}

Semifinals
1	(Germany) G Kretschmer (Germany) A Satschko	1	6	[11]
(Croatia) N Mektić (Croatia) A Šančić	6	3	[9]
4	(United Kingdom) K Skupski (United Kingdom) N Skupski	6	6^{2}	[8]
(Sweden) J Brunström (Sweden) A Siljeström	2	7^{7}	[10]

Final
1	(Germany) G Kretschmer (Germany) A Satschko	3	4
(Sweden) J Brunström (Sweden) A Siljeström	6	6
