= 2014 Chang-Sat Bangkok Open – Doubles =

Doubles
- 2014 Chang-Sat Bangkok Open

Final
- Champions: (Thailand) Pruchya Isaro (Thailand) Nuttanon Kadchapanan
- Runners-up: (Chinese Taipei) Chen Ti (Chinese Taipei) Peng Hsien-yin
- Score: 6–4, 6–4

Events
Singles	Doubles
← 2013 ·	Chang-Sat Bangkok Open	· 2015 →

Chen Ti and Peng Hsien-yin were the defending champions, but lost in the final.

Pruchya Isaro and Nuttanon Kadchapanan won the title, beating defending champions Chen Ti and Peng Hsien-yin 6–4, 6–4.

== Seeds ==
1. (Thailand) Sanchai Ratiwatana / (Thailand) Sonchat Ratiwatana (quarterfinals)
2. (Chinese Taipei) Chen Ti / (Chinese Taipei) Peng Hsien-yin (final)
3. (Chinese Taipei) Lee Hsin-han / (Thailand) Danai Udomchoke (first round)
4. (India) Divij Sharan / (Japan) Yasutaka Uchiyama (semifinals)

== Draw ==
=== Key ===
- Q = Qualifier
- WC = Wild card
- LL = Lucky loser
- Alt = Alternate
- SE = Special exempt
- PR = Protected ranking
- ITF = ITF entry
- JE = Junior exempt
- w/o = Walkover
- r = Retired
- d = Defaulted
- SR = Special ranking

=== Draw ===
First round
1	(Thailand) S Ratiwatana (Thailand) S Ratiwatana	1
(Australia) M Reid (Australia) J Thompson	0r
(Thailand) P Isaro (Thailand) N Kadchapanan	7^{8}	7
(Indonesia) C Rungkat (Thailand) K Wachiramanowong	6^{6}	5
4	(India) D Sharan (Japan) Y Uchiyama	6	6
(United States) J Jung (United States) N Meister	3	2
WC	(Thailand) Chayanon Kaewsuto (Thailand) P Siriluethaiwattana	3	6	[9]
WC	(Thailand) Chaleechan Tanasugarn (Thailand) Warot Udomsuk	6	1	[11]
(Chinese Taipei) L-c Huang (Japan) T Matsui	4	7	[10]
(Italy) T Fabbiano (Italy) L Vanni	6	5	[3]
(Republic of Ireland) J Cluskey (United Kingdom) K Edmund	4	6	[10]
3	(Chinese Taipei) H-h Lee (Thailand) D Udomchoke	6	3	[8]
(Japan) Bumpei Sato (Japan) G Soeda	6	6
WC	(Thailand) Phassawit Burapharitta (Thailand) Singekrawee Wattanakul	3	2
(Spain) Jaime Pulgar-Garcia (India) R Ramanathan	6	2	[6]
2	(Chinese Taipei) T Chen (Chinese Taipei) H-y Peng	3	6	[10]

Quarterfinals
1	(Thailand) S Ratiwatana (Thailand) S Ratiwatana	6^{4}	6	[10]
(Thailand) P Isaro (Thailand) N Kadchapanan	7^{7}	4	[12]
4	(India) D Sharan (Japan) Y Uchiyama	6	6
WC	(Thailand) C Tanasugarn (Thailand) W Udomsuk	0	1
(Chinese Taipei) L-c Huang (Japan) T Matsui	6^{3}	3
(Republic of Ireland) J Cluskey (United Kingdom) K Edmund	7^{7}	6
(Japan) B Sato (Japan) G Soeda	6^{5}	4
2	(Chinese Taipei) T Chen (Chinese Taipei) H-y Peng	7^{7}	6

Semifinals
(Thailand) P Isaro (Thailand) N Kadchapanan	2	6	[11]
4	(India) D Sharan (Japan) Y Uchiyama	6	4	[9]
(Republic of Ireland) J Cluskey (United Kingdom) K Edmund	4	4
2	(Chinese Taipei) T Chen (Chinese Taipei) H-y Peng	6	6

Final
(Thailand) P Isaro (Thailand) N Kadchapanan	6	6
2	(Chinese Taipei) T Chen (Chinese Taipei) H-y Peng	4	4
