= 2010 Farmers Classic – Singles =

Singles
- 2010 Farmers Classic

Final
- Champion: (United States) Sam Querrey
- Runner-up: (United Kingdom) Andy Murray
- Score: 5–7, 7–6^{(7–2)}, 6–3

Details
- Draw: 28 (4 Q / 3 WC )
- Seeds: 8

Events
Singles	Doubles
← 2009 ·	Los Angeles Open	· 2011 →

Sam Querrey had a tough road for his title defense – having to battle back from being down numerous times during his matches, but eventually, he successfully defended the title after defeating Andy Murray 5–7, 7–6^{(7–2)}, 6–3 in the final. Querrey saved a championship point while serving at 4–5 in the 2nd set. He had previously saved a match point in the semifinals against Janko Tipsarević, also during the 2nd set while serving at 4–5.

== Seeds ==
The top four seeds receive a bye into the second round.

1. (United Kingdom) Andy Murray (final)
2. (United States) Sam Querrey (champion)
3. (Cyprus) Marcos Baghdatis (quarterfinals)
4. (Spain) Feliciano López (semifinals)
5. (Latvia) Ernests Gulbis (second round)
6. (Serbia) Janko Tipsarević (semifinals)
7. (Argentina) Horacio Zeballos (first round, retired due to a shoulder injury)
8. (United States) Mardy Fish (withdrew due to fatigue)

== Draw ==
=== Key ===
- Q = Qualifier
- WC = Wild card
- LL = Lucky loser
- Alt = Alternate
- SE = Special exempt
- PR = Protected ranking
- ITF = ITF entry
- JE = Junior exempt
- w/o = Walkover
- r = Retired
- d = Defaulted
- SR = Special ranking

=== Finals ===
Semifinals
1/WC	(United Kingdom) Andy Murray	6	1	6
4	(Spain) Feliciano López	0	6	4
6	(Serbia) Janko Tipsarević	7^{7}	6^{5}	4
2	(United States) Sam Querrey	6^{3}	7^{7}	6

Final
1/WC	(United Kingdom) Andy Murray	7	6^{2}	3
2	(United States) Sam Querrey	5	7^{7}	6

=== Top half ===
First round
Q	(United States) T Smyczek	6	6
(Russia) T Gabashvili	2	3
(Slovakia) K Beck	6^{3}	4
(Colombia) A Falla	7^{7}	6
(Slovakia) L Lacko	5	5
5	(Latvia) E Gulbis	7	7
(Belgium) X Malisse	1	6	3
(Israel) D Sela	6	4	6
(Argentina) L Mayer	1	4
WC	(United States) J Blake	6	6
(Germany) B Becker	7	7^{8}
LL	(Ecuador) G Lapentti	5	6^{6}

Second round
1/WC	(United Kingdom) A Murray	6	4	6
Q	(United States) T Smyczek	1	6	2
(Colombia) A Falla	4	6	7^{10}
5	(Latvia) E Gulbis	6	3	6^{8}
4	(Spain) F López	7^{7}	6
(Israel) D Sela	6^{2}	4
WC	(United States) J Blake	7	7^{7}
(Germany) B Becker	5	6^{5}

Quarterfinals
1/WC	(United Kingdom) A Murray	7^{7}	6
(Colombia) A Falla	6^{3}	1
4	(Spain) F López	3	7^{8}	6
WC	(United States) J Blake	6	6^{6}	4

Semifinals
1/WC	(United Kingdom) A Murray	6	1	6
4	(Spain) F López	0	6	4

=== Bottom half ===
First round
6	(Serbia) J Tipsarević	6	6
(Colombia) S Giraldo	1	0
Q	(United States) S Johnson	4	4
Q	(India) S Devvarman	6	6
(Belgium) K Vliegen	6	3	4
WC	(United States) R Sweeting	2	6	6
7	(Argentina) H Zeballos	3	0	r
(Germany) R Schüttler	6	3
Q	(Serbia) I Bozoljac	3	4
(United States) R Ginepri	6	6
SE	(South Africa) K Anderson	6	6
(Ukraine) I Marchenko	3	2

Second round
6	(Serbia) J Tipsarević	7^{11}	6
Q	(India) S Devvarman	6^{9}	2
WC	(United States) R Sweeting	6	2	3
3	(Cyprus) M Baghdatis	3	6	6
(Germany) R Schüttler	6	3	6
(United States) R Ginepri	3	6	4
SE	(South Africa) K Anderson	6^{8}	6	0
2	(United States) S Querrey	7^{10}	4	6

Quarterfinals
6	(Serbia) J Tipsarević	6	7
3	(Cyprus) M Baghdatis	3	5
(Germany) R Schüttler	2	6	6^{4}
2	(United States) S Querrey	6	3	7^{7}

Semifinals
6	(Serbia) J Tipsarević	7^{7}	6^{5}	4
2	(United States) S Querrey	6^{3}	7^{7}	6
