= 2011 Farmers Classic – Doubles =

Doubles
- 2011 Farmers Classic

Final
- Champions: (The Bahamas) Mark Knowles (Belgium) Xavier Malisse
- Runners-up: (India) Somdev Devvarman (Philippines) Treat Conrad Huey
- Score: 7–6^{(7–3)}, 7–6^{(12–10)}

Details
- Draw: 16
- Seeds: 4

Events
Singles	Doubles
← 2010 ·	Los Angeles Open	· 2012 →

Bob and Mike Bryan were the defending champions and winners of six of the last ten tournaments, but chose not to compete in this year's competition.

Mark Knowles and Xavier Malisse won this tournament, by defeating Somdev Devvarman and Treat Conrad Huey in the final, 7–6^{(7–3)}, 7–6^{(12–10)}. They were the first non-American doubles champions since 2002.

== Seeds ==
1. (Brazil) Marcelo Melo / (Brazil) Bruno Soares (first round)
2. (United States) Scott Lipsky / (United States) Rajeev Ram (first round)
3. (The Bahamas) Mark Knowles / (Belgium) Xavier Malisse (champions)
4. (Israel) Jonathan Erlich / (Israel) Andy Ram (semifinals)

== Draw ==
=== Key ===
- Q = Qualifier
- WC = Wild card
- LL = Lucky loser
- Alt = Alternate
- ITF = ITF entry
- PR = Protected ranking
- SR = Special ranking
- SE = Special exempt
- JE = Junior exempt
- JR = Junior Accelerator Programme entrant
- CO = College Accelerator Programme entrant
- NG = Next Gen Accelerator Program entrant
- w/o = Walkover
- r = Retired
- d = Defaulted

=== Draw ===
First round
1	(Brazil) M Melo (Brazil) B Soares	3	4
(India) S Devvarman (Philippines) TC Huey	6	6
(Luxembourg) G Müller (United Kingdom) J Murray	3	6	[13]
Alt	(United States) A Bogomolov Jr. (Latvia) E Gulbis	6	3	[11]
4	(Israel) J Erlich (Israel) A Ram	7^{7}	6
(Bulgaria) G Dimitrov (Russia) D Tursunov	6^{4}	2
(Cyprus) M Baghdatis (United States) M Russell	6	7^{7}
Alt	(Brazil) B Semenzato (Brazil) M Torres	0	6^{5}
(Brazil) T Bellucci (Colombia) A Falla	6	6
(Australia) S Huss (Russia) I Kunitsyn	0	3
(United Kingdom) C Fleming (United Kingdom) R Hutchins	1	4
3	(The Bahamas) M Knowles (Belgium) X Malisse	6	6
(Germany) M Berrer (Germany) T Haas	6	6
WC	(United States) J Blake (United States) R Sweeting	1	4
(Chinese Taipei) Y-h Lu (Germany) F Moser	7	2	[10]
2	(United States) S Lipsky (United States) R Ram	5	6	[3]

Quarterfinals
(India) S Devvarman (Philippines) TC Huey	6	6
(Luxembourg) G Müller (United Kingdom) J Murray	2	4
4	(Israel) J Erlich (Israel) A Ram	6	7^{7}
(Cyprus) M Baghdatis (United States) M Russell	1	6^{4}
(Brazil) T Bellucci (Colombia) A Falla	3	2
3	(The Bahamas) M Knowles (Belgium) X Malisse	6	6
(Germany) M Berrer (Germany) T Haas	4	4
(Chinese Taipei) Y-h Lu (Germany) F Moser	6	6

Semifinals
(India) S Devvarman (Philippines) TC Huey	7^{8}	6^{8}	[10]
4	(Israel) J Erlich (Israel) A Ram	6^{6}	7^{10}	[4]
3	(The Bahamas) M Knowles (Belgium) X Malisse	4	6	[10]
(Chinese Taipei) Y-h Lu (Germany) F Moser	6	4	[7]

Finals
(India) S Devvarman (Philippines) TC Huey	6^{3}	6^{10}
3	(The Bahamas) M Knowles (Belgium) X Malisse	7^{7}	7^{12}
