= 2015 Nielsen Pro Tennis Championship – Doubles =

Doubles
- 2015 Nielsen Pro Tennis Championship

Final
- Champion: (Sweden) Johan Brunström (United States) Nicholas Monroe
- Runner-up: (United States) Sekou Bangoura (Canada) Frank Dancevic
- Score: 4–6, 6–3, [10–8]

Events
Singles	Doubles
- Nielsen Pro Tennis Championship

Thanasi Kokkinakis and Denis Kudla were the defending champions, but they did not participate this year. Johan Brunström and Nicholas Monroe won the title by defeating Sekou Bangoura and Frank Dancevic in the final by a score of 4–6, 6–3, [10–8].

== Seeds ==
1. (Sweden) Johan Brunström / (United States) Nicholas Monroe (champions)
2. (Australia) Alex Bolt / (Australia) Andrew Whittington (semifinals, withdrew)
3. (India) Saketh Myneni / (Australia) Matt Reid (first round)
4. (Chile) Julio Peralta / (United States) Matt Seeberger (quarterfinals)

== Draw ==
Key

- Q = Qualifier
- WC = Wild card
- LL = Lucky loser
- Alt = Alternate
- ITF = ITF entry
- PR = Protected ranking
- SR = Special ranking
- SE = Special exempt
- JE = Junior exempt
- JR = Junior Accelerator Programme entrant
- CO = College Accelerator Programme entrant
- NG = Next Gen Accelerator Program entrant
- w/o = Walkover
- r = Retired
- d = Defaulted

First round
1	(Sweden) J Brunström (United States) N Monroe	7	6
(Chinese Taipei) J Jung (United States) Connor Smith	5	2
(India) S Devvarman (India) S Singh	3	4
WC	(United States) Graham Alrutz (United States) Dennis Nevolo	6	6
4	(Chile) J Peralta (United States) M Seeberger	4	7^{7}	[10]
(Bulgaria) D Kutrovsky (South Africa) D O'Brien	6	6^{5}	[8]
WC	(United States) M McDonald (United States) N Meister	6^{4}	6	[10]
PR	(Australia) G Jones (United States) A Kuznetsov	7^{7}	1	[5]
(Republic of Ireland) J Cluskey (Republic of Ireland) D O'Hare	6^{5}	4
(United States) S Bangoura (Canada) F Dancevic	7^{7}	6
(Italy) Erik Crepaldi (Brazil) Henrique Cunha	1	7^{7}	[10]
3	(India) S Myneni (Australia) M Reid	6	6^{3}	[8]
WC	(United States) Aron Hiltzik (United States) Robert Stineman	3	7^{7}	[10]
(United States) D Nguyen (United States) A Sarkissian	6	6^{4}	[8]
(Australia) O Jasika (Australia) B Mitchell
2	(Australia) A Bolt (Australia) A Whittington	w/o

Quarterfinals
1	(Sweden) J Brunström (United States) N Monroe	6	6
WC	(United States) G Alrutz (United States) D Nevolo	2	2
4	(Chile) J Peralta (United States) M Seeberger	3	6^{5}
WC	(United States) M McDonald (United States) N Meister	6	7^{7}
(United States) S Bangoura (Canada) F Dancevic	7^{9}	6
(Italy) E Crepaldi (Brazil) H Cunha	6^{7}	2
WC	(United States) A Hiltzik (United States) R Stineman	5	6^{9}
2	(Australia) A Bolt (Australia) A Whittington	7	7^{9}

Semifinals
1	(Sweden) J Brunström (United States) N Monroe	6	6
WC	(United States) M McDonald (United States) N Meister	2	3
(United States) S Bangoura (Canada) F Dancevic	w/o
2	(Australia) A Bolt (Australia) A Whittington

Final
1	(Sweden) J Brunström (United States) N Monroe	4	6	[10]
(United States) S Bangoura (Canada) F Dancevic	6	3	[8]
