= 2014 Chang-Sat Bangkok Open =

- Date: 25–31 August
- Edition: 6th
- Surface: Hard
- Location: Bangkok, Thailand

Champions

Singles
- (South Korea) Hyeon Chung

Doubles
- (Thailand) Pruchya Isaro / (Thailand) Nuttanon Kadchapanan
← 2013 ·	Chang-Sat Bangkok Open	· 2015 →

The 2014 Chang-Sat Bangkok Open was a professional tennis tournament played on hard courts. It was the sixth edition of the tournament which was part of the 2014 ATP Challenger Tour. It took place in Bangkok, Thailand between 25 and 31 August 2014.

== Singles main-draw entrants ==
=== Seeds ===
Country	Player	Rank^{1}	Seed
JPN	Go Soeda	107	1
AUS	James Duckworth	155	2
ITA	Luca Vanni	170	3
ITA	Thomas Fabbiano	227	4
AUS	Matt Reid	236	5
GBR	Kyle Edmund	237	6
JPN	Yasutaka Uchiyama	242	7
SWE	Elias Ymer	244	8

- ^{1} Rankings are as of August 18, 2014.

=== Other entrants ===
The following players received wildcards into the singles main draw:

- (Thailand) Phassawit Burapharitta
- (Thailand) Nuttanon Kadchapanan
- (Thailand) Pruchya Isaro
- (Thailand) Kittipong Wachiramanowong

The following players received entry from the qualifying draw:

- (Uzbekistan) Sanjar Fayziev
- (Indonesia) Christopher Rungkat
- (Thailand) Peerakiat Siriluethaiwattana
- (Thailand) Chaleechan Tanasugarn

== Champions ==
=== Singles ===
- (South Korea) Hyeon Chung def. (Australia) Jordan Thompson 7–6^{(7–0)}, 6–4

=== Doubles ===
- (Thailand) Pruchya Isaro / (Thailand) Nuttanon Kadchapanan def. (Chinese Taipei) Chen Ti / (Chinese Taipei) Peng Hsien-yin 6–4, 6–4
