= 2015 Nielsen Pro Tennis Championship – Singles =

Singles
- 2015 Nielsen Pro Tennis Championship

Final
- Champion: (India) Somdev Devvarman
- Runner-up: (United States) Daniel Nguyen
- Score: 7–5, 4–6, 7–6^{(7–5)}

Events
| Singles | Doubles |
| ← 2014 · | Nielsen Pro Tennis Championship | · 2016 → |

Denis Kudla was the defending champion, but he did not participate this year. Somdev Devvarman won the title by defeating Daniel Nguyen in the final by a score of 7–5, 4–6, 7–6^{(7–5)}. The final match lasted for 3 hours and 31 minutes.

== Seeds ==
1. (Japan) Tatsuma Ito (first round)
2. (Ukraine) Illya Marchenko (second round)
3. (Slovenia) Blaž Kavčič (second round)
4. (United States) Austin Krajicek (second round)
5. (United States) Ryan Harrison (semifinals)
6. (Japan) Yūichi Sugita (withdrew)
7. (India) Somdev Devvarman (champion)
8. (United States) Connor Smith (first round)

== Draw ==
=== Key ===
- Q = Qualifier
- WC = Wild card
- LL = Lucky loser
- Alt = Alternate
- SE = Special exempt
- PR = Protected ranking
- ITF = ITF entry
- JE = Junior exempt
- w/o = Walkover
- r = Retired
- d = Defaulted
- SR = Special ranking

=== Finals ===
Semifinals
7 | (India) Somdev Devvarman | 6 | 6
5 | (United States) Ryan Harrison | 0 | 4
(Switzerland) Adrien Bossel | 2 | 4
(United States) Daniel Nguyen | 6 | 6

Final
7 | (India) Somdev Devvarman | 7 | 4 | 7^{7}
(United States) Daniel Nguyen | 5 | 6 | 6^{5}

=== Top half ===
First round
1 | (Japan) T Ito | 6 | 2 | 4
Q | (United States) N Meister | 1 | 6 | 6
Q | (United States) Dennis Nevolo | 6 | 6
(Chinese Taipei) J Jung | 2 | 4
(Croatia) M Pecotić | 2 | 7 | 7^{7}
(Bulgaria) D Kutrovsky | 6 | 5 | 6^{2}
(United States) F Tiafoe | 3 | 1
7 | (India) S Devvarman | 6 | 6
3 | (Slovenia) B Kavčič | 7^{7} | 6
(United States) A Sarkissian | 6^{5} | 4
Q | (United States) M Giron | 6 | 7^{7}
WC | (United States) T Fawcett | 1 | 6^{2}
Alt | (Canada) F Dancevic | 6 | 6
(India) S Myneni | 3 | 2
WC | (United States) S Kozlov | 4 | 4
5 | (United States) R Harrison | 6 | 6

Second round
Q | (United States) N Meister | 6 | 7^{14}
Q | (United States) D Nevolo | 3 | 6^{12}
(Croatia) M Pecotić | 2 | 5
7 | (India) S Devvarman | 6 | 7
3 | (Slovenia) B Kavčič | 3 | 6 | 7
Q | (United States) M Giron | 6 | 2 | 5
Alt | (Canada) F Dancevic | 7^{7} | 5 | 6^{5}
5 | (United States) R Harrison | 6^{2} | 7 | 7^{7}

Quarterfinals
Q | (United States) N Meister | 6^{4} | 6 | 2
7 | (India) S Devvarman | 7^{7} | 4 | 6
3 | (Slovenia) B Kavčič | 6^{3} | 7^{8} | 1
5 | (United States) R Harrison | 7^{7} | 6^{6} | 6

Semifinals
7 | (India) S Devvarman | 6 | 6
5 | (United States) R Harrison | 0 | 4

=== Bottom half ===
First round
8 | (United States) Connor Smith | 4 | 2
WC | (United States) Jared Hiltzik | 6 | 6
Alt | (United States) T Sandgren | 5 | 6 | 6^{3}
LL | (United States) E Escobedo | 7 | 3 | 7^{7}
(Switzerland) A Bossel | 7^{7} | 1 | 6
(United States) A Kuznetsov | 6^{5} | 6 | 3
(Italy) Erik Crepaldi | 6 | 1 | 2
4 | (United States) A Krajicek | 4 | 6 | 6
Q | (Australia) A Whittington | 7^{9} | 6
WC | (United States) M McDonald | 6^{7} | 2
(United States) D Nguyen | 6^{4} | 6 | 6
(Brazil) Henrique Cunha | 7^{7} | 2 | 2
(United States) M Krueger | 6 | 6
(Australia) A Bolt | 4 | 1
(Australia) B Mitchell | 6^{0} | 3
2 | (Ukraine) I Marchenko | 7^{7} | 6

Second round
WC | (United States) J Hiltzik | 6 | 6
LL | (United States) E Escobedo | 4 | 4
(Switzerland) A Bossel | 7^{8} | 6
4 | (United States) A Krajicek | 6^{6} | 3
Q | (Australia) A Whittington | 6 | 1 | 2
(United States) D Nguyen | 3 | 6 | 6
(United States) M Krueger | 6 | 2 | 7
2 | (Ukraine) I Marchenko | 4 | 6 | 5

Quarterfinals
WC | (United States) J Hiltzik | 3 | 7 | 4
(Switzerland) A Bossel | 6 | 5 | 6
(United States) D Nguyen | 6 | 6
(United States) M Krueger | 4 | 4

Semifinals
(Switzerland) A Bossel | 2 | 4
(United States) D Nguyen | 6 | 6
