= 2014 Chang-Sat Bangkok Open – Singles =

Singles
- 2014 Chang-Sat Bangkok Open

Final
- Champion: (South Korea) Hyeon Chung
- Runner-up: (Australia) Jordan Thompson
- Score: 7–6^{(7–0)}, 6–4

Events
Singles	Doubles
- Chang-Sat Bangkok Open

Blaž Kavčič was the defending champion, but elected not to defend his title.
Hyeon Chung clinched his maiden ATP Challenger Tour title, beating Jordan Thompson 7–6^{(7–0)}, 6–4 in the final.

== Seeds ==
1. (Japan) Go Soeda (semifinals)
2. (Australia) James Duckworth (second round)
3. (Italy) Luca Vanni (semifinals)
4. (Italy) Thomas Fabbiano (first round)
5. (Australia) Matt Reid (second round)
6. (United Kingdom) Kyle Edmund (quarterfinals)
7. (Japan) Yasutaka Uchiyama (quarterfinals)
8. (Sweden) Elias Ymer (first round)

== Draw ==
Key

- Q = Qualifier
- WC = Wild card
- LL = Lucky loser
- Alt = Alternate
- ITF = ITF entry
- PR = Protected ranking
- SR = Special ranking
- SE = Special exempt
- JE = Junior exempt
- JR = Junior Accelerator Programme entrant
- CO = College Accelerator Programme entrant
- NG = Next Gen Accelerator Program entrant
- w/o = Walkover
- r = Retired
- d = Defaulted

=== Finals ===
Semifinals
1	(Japan) Go Soeda	4	6	4
(South Korea) Chung Hyeon	6	2	6
3	(Italy) Luca Vanni	1	3
(Australia) Jordan Thompson	6	6

Final
(South Korea) Chung Hyeon	7^{7}	6
(Australia) Jordan Thompson	6^{0}	4

=== Top half ===
First round
1	(Japan) G Soeda	6	6
(Uzbekistan) T Ismailov	3	4
(Australia) Jacob Grills	6	2	2
(United States) J Jung	4	6	6
(Japan) Yu Watanuki	6	7^{7}
Q	(Uzbekistan) S Fayziev	3	6^{4}
(Thailand) Congsup Congcar	3	1
7	(Japan) Y Uchiyama	6	6
4	(Italy) T Fabbiano	1	2
(United States) N Meister	6	6
(South Korea) H Chung	7	6
(Thailand) D Udomchoke	5	3
(Chinese Taipei) L-c Huang	6	6
(Spain) Jaime Pulgar-Garcia	4	4
(Japan) T Matsui	7	6
8	(Sweden) E Ymer	5	3

Second round
1	(Japan) G Soeda	6	7^{7}
(United States) J Jung	3	6^{4}
(Japan) Y Watanuki	3	3
7	(Japan) Y Uchiyama	6	6
(United States) N Meister
(South Korea) H Chung	w/o
(Chinese Taipei) L-c Huang	7^{7}	4	6
(Japan) T Matsui	6^{6}	6	3

Quarterfinals
1	(Japan) G Soeda	6	6
(Japan) Y Uchiyama	4	3
(South Korea) H Chung	6	6
(Chinese Taipei) L-c Huang	1	0

Semifinals
1	(Japan) G Soeda	4	6	4
(South Korea) H Chung	6	2	6

=== Bottom half ===
First round
5	(Australia) M Reid	6	7^{7}
Q	(Indonesia) C Rungkat	3	6^{4}
Q	(Thailand) P Siriluethaiwattana	0	2
(Chinese Taipei) T Chen	6	6
Q	(Thailand) Chaleechan Tanasugarn	6	2	1
(India) S Mukund	3	6	6
(India) R Ramanathan	6^{5}	6^{4}
3	(Italy) L Vanni	7^{7}	7^{7}
6	(United Kingdom) K Edmund	6	6
(Japan) Bumpei Sato	0	1
WC	(Thailand) K Wachiramanowong	4	2
WC	(Thailand) P Isaro	6	6
(Australia) J Thompson	6	6
WC	(Thailand) Phassawit Burapharitta	0	1
WC	(Thailand) N Kadchapanan	2	3
2	(Australia) J Duckworth	6	6

Second round
5	(Australia) M Reid	6	6^{3}	2
(Chinese Taipei) T Chen	3	7^{7}	6
(India) S Mukund	6^{3}	2
3	(Italy) L Vanni	7^{7}	6
6	(United Kingdom) K Edmund	6	6
WC	(Thailand) P Isaro	2	4
(Australia) J Thompson	6	6
2	(Australia) J Duckworth	2	4

Quarterfinals
(Chinese Taipei) T Chen	4	4
3	(Italy) L Vanni	6	6
6	(United Kingdom) K Edmund	3	1
(Australia) J Thompson	6	6

Semifinals
3	(Italy) L Vanni	1	3
(Australia) J Thompson	6	6
