= 2012 Farmers Classic – Singles =

Singles
- 2012 Farmers Classic

Final
- Champion: (United States) Sam Querrey
- Runner-up: (Lithuania) Ričardas Berankis
- Score: 6–0, 6–2

Details
- Draw: 28 (4 Q / 3 WC )
- Seeds: 8

Events
Singles	Doubles
- Los Angeles Open

The 2012 Farmers Classic Doubles was a men's tennis tournament played on outdoor hard courts in Los Angeles, California.

Ernests Gulbis was the defending champion, but chose not to participate.

Sam Querrey won the title, defeating Ričardas Berankis in the final, 6–0, 6–2. This was Querrey's third title at the event.

== Seeds ==
The top four seeds receive a bye into the second round.

1. (France) Benoît Paire (second round)
2. (United States) Sam Querrey (champion)
3. (Argentina) Leonardo Mayer (quarterfinals)
4. (France) Nicolas Mahut (quarterfinals)
5. (Belgium) Xavier Malisse (quarterfinals, retired because of a left knee injury)
6. (Australia) Marinko Matosevic (semifinals)
7. (Germany) Björn Phau (first round)
8. (United States) Brian Baker (first round)

== Draw ==
Key

- Q = Qualifier
- WC = Wild card
- LL = Lucky loser
- Alt = Alternate
- ITF = ITF entry
- PR = Protected ranking
- SR = Special ranking
- SE = Special exempt
- JE = Junior exempt
- JR = Junior Accelerator Programme entrant
- CO = College Accelerator Programme entrant
- NG = Next Gen Accelerator Program entrant
- w/o = Walkover
- r = Retired
- d = Defaulted

=== Finals ===
Semifinals
6	(Australia) Marinko Matosevic	5	1
Q	(Lithuania) Ričardas Berankis	7	6
(United States) Rajeev Ram	3	6^{4}
2	(United States) Sam Querrey	6	7^{7}

Final
Q	(Lithuania) Ričardas Berankis	0	2
2	(United States) Sam Querrey	6	6

=== Top half ===
First round
(United States) J Levine	3	4
(United States) M Russell	6	6
(Germany) T Kamke	6	5	7^{7}
(United States) J Blake	2	7	6^{4}
Q	(Australia) C Guccione	6	3	3
6	(Australia) M Matosevic	3	6	6
Q	(United States) B Klahn	4	6	0
(Italy) P Lorenzi	6	3	6
(Israel) D Sela	6^{4}	4
(Russia) I Andreev	7^{7}	6
Q	(Lithuania) R Berankis	7^{10}	6
7	(Germany) B Phau	6^{8}	4

Second round
1	(France) B Paire	5	4
(United States) M Russell	7	6
(Germany) T Kamke	3	6	0
6	(Australia) M Matosevic	6	1	6
4	(France) N Mahut	7	7^{9}
(Italy) P Lorenzi	5	6^{7}
(Russia) I Andreev	4	5
Q	(Lithuania) R Berankis	6	7

Quarterfinals
(United States) M Russell	2	3
6	(Australia) M Matosevic	6	6
4	(France) N Mahut	4	4
Q	(Lithuania) R Berankis	6	6

Semifinals
6	(Australia) M Matosevic	5	1
Q	(Lithuania) R Berankis	7	6

=== Bottom half ===
First round
8/WC	(United States) B Baker	6^{3}	5
(United States) R Ram	7^{7}	7
(Russia) I Kunitsyn	4	6^{5}
(Chile) P Capdeville	6	7^{7}
(Italy) F Cipolla	6	6
WC	(United States) J Sock	3	1
5	(Belgium) X Malisse	6	6
Q	(United States) N Meister	4	1
(Germany) M Berrer	6	2	6^{4}
(Australia) M Ebden	4	6	7^{7}
WC	(United States) S Johnson	6^{4}	3
(Netherlands) I Sijsling	7^{7}	6

Second round
(United States) R Ram	6	6
(Chile) P Capdeville	3	1
(Italy) F Cipolla	0	0^{r}
3	(Argentina) L Mayer	6	4
5	(Belgium) X Malisse	6	6
(Australia) M Ebden	4	3
(Netherlands) I Sijsling	2	2
2	(United States) S Querrey	6	6

Quarterfinals
(United States) R Ram	7^{7}	6
3	(Argentina) L Mayer	6^{3}	3
5	(Belgium) X Malisse	2	1^{r}
2	(United States) S Querrey	6	3

Semifinals
(United States) R Ram	3	6^{4}
2	(United States) S Querrey	6	7^{7}

== Qualifying ==
=== Seeds ===
1. (United States) Ryan Sweeting (first round, retired because of a back injury)
2. (Belgium) Ruben Bemelmans (first round)
3. (Switzerland) Marco Chiudinelli (second round)
4. (Ukraine) Sergei Bubka (first round)
5. (Lithuania) Ričardas Berankis (qualified)
6. (Brazil) Ricardo Mello (first round)
7. (United States) Tim Smyczek (second round)
8. (South Africa) Rik de Voest (second round)

=== Qualifiers ===
1. (United States) Bradley Klahn
2. (Australia) Chris Guccione
3. (United States) Nicolas Meister
4. (Lithuania) Ričardas Berankis

=== Draw ===
==== First qualifier ====
First round
1	(United States) Ryan Sweeting	2	3^{r}
(France) Clément Reix	6	5
(United States) Alex Kuznetsov	6	6
(Brazil) Pedro Zerbini	2	1
(United States) Bradley Klahn	6	3
(Brazil) Ricardo Hocevar	2	0^{r}
(United States) Mitchell Frank	1	4
7	(United States) Tim Smyczek	6	6

Second round
(France) Clément Reix	2	3
(United States) Alex Kuznetsov	6	6
(United States) Bradley Klahn	6	2	6
7	(United States) Tim Smyczek	0	6	3

Qualifying competition
(United States) Alex Kuznetsov	6^{5}	6^{2}
(United States) Bradley Klahn	7^{7}	7^{7}

==== Second qualifier ====
First round
2	(Belgium) Ruben Bemelmans	3	6	3
(Australia) Chris Guccione	6	1	6
(Russia) Mikhail Ledovskikh	7^{7}	3	4
(United States) Jeff Dadamo	6^{6}	6	6
(Lithuania) Laurynas Grigelis	3	1
(Canada) Pierre-Ludovic Duclos	6	6
(Republic of Ireland) Louk Sorensen	6^{6}	6	7^{7}
6	(Brazil) Ricardo Mello	7^{8}	3	6^{3}

Second round
(Australia) Chris Guccione	6	6
(United States) Jeff Dadamo	2	4
(Canada) Pierre-Ludovic Duclos	6^{5}	2
(Republic of Ireland) Louk Sorensen	7^{7}	6

Qualifying competition
(Australia) Chris Guccione	6	6
(Republic of Ireland) Louk Sorensen	2	3

==== Third qualifier ====
First round
3	(Switzerland) Marco Chiudinelli	6	7
(United States) Blake Strode	2	5
(Chinese Taipei) Jimmy Wang	2	7	6
WC	(United States) Andre Dome	6	5	2
(United States) Nicolas Meister	7	6
(Serbia) Ilija Bozoljac	5	0
WC	(United States) Raymond Sarmiento	6	1	0
8	(South Africa) Rik de Voest	3	6	6

Second round
3	(Switzerland) Marco Chiudinelli	6	5	6^{2}
(Chinese Taipei) Jimmy Wang	3	7	7^{7}
(United States) Nicolas Meister	3	7	6
8	(South Africa) Rik de Voest	6	5	3

Qualifying competition
(Chinese Taipei) Jimmy Wang	4	6^{3}
(United States) Nicolas Meister	6	7^{7}

==== Fourth qualifier ====
First round
4	(Ukraine) Sergei Bubka	6^{8}	2
(Uruguay) Marcel Felder	7^{10}	6
(United States) Kevin Kim	6	6
(Belarus) Egor Puntus	1	0
WC	(United States) Marcos Giron	3	6	4
WC	(United States) Clay Thompson	6	4	6
(United States) Dennis Lajola	3	7	5
5	(Lithuania) Ričardas Berankis	6	5	7

Second round
(Uruguay) Marcel Felder	6	6
(United States) Kevin Kim	3	0
WC	(United States) Clay Thompson	2	4
5	(Lithuania) Ričardas Berankis	6	6

Qualifying competition
(Uruguay) Marcel Felder	2	3
5	(Lithuania) Ričardas Berankis	6	6
