= 2011 Farmers Classic =

- Date: July 25–31
- Edition: 85th
- Category: ATP World Tour 250
- Draw: 28S / 16D
- Prize money: $619,500
- Surface: Hard / outdoor
- Location: Los Angeles, United States
- Venue: Los Angeles Tennis Center

Champions

Singles
- (Latvia) Ernests Gulbis

Doubles
- (The Bahamas) Mark Knowles / (Belgium) Xavier Malisse
← 2010 ·	Los Angeles Open	· 2012 →

The 2011 Farmers Classic, presented by Mercedes-Benz, was a men's tennis tournament played on outdoor hard courts in Los Angeles. It was the 85th edition of the Los Angeles Open, and was part of the Olympus US Open Series of the 2011 ATP World Tour. It took place at the Los Angeles Tennis Center on the campus of UCLA, from July 25 through July 31, 2011, with total player compensation in excess of $1 million. The events were televised by ESPN2 and the Tennis Channel. Following the tournament, a Coldplay concert was held on August 3 and broadcast a portion on ABC's Jimmy Kimmel Live!.

Juan Martín del Potro, who won the 2008 Countrywide Classic and 2009 US Open was one of the first players signed on to play in the tournament. The Argentinean reached a career high of No. 4 in 2010.

Unseeded Ernests Gulbis won the singles title and the accompanying first-prize money of $113,000.

== ATP entrants ==
=== Seeds ===
Country	Player	Ranking*	Seeding
USA	Mardy Fish	9	1
ARG	Juan Martín del Potro	19	2
CYP	Marcos Baghdatis	26	3
BRA	Thomaz Bellucci	33	4
BEL	Xavier Malisse	40	5
RUS	Dmitry Tursunov	48	6
BUL	Grigor Dimitrov	59	7
RUS	Igor Kunitsyn	61	8

*Seedings based on the July 18, 2011 rankings.

=== Other entrants ===
The following players received wildcards into the singles main draw:

- (United States) Robby Ginepri
- (Germany) Tommy Haas
- (United States) Steve Johnson

The following players received entry as a special exempt into the singles main draw:

- (United States) Ryan Harrison

The following players received entry from the qualifying draw:

- (Lithuania) Laurynas Grigelis
- (Australia) Greg Jones
- (United States) Daniel Kosakowski
- (United States) Tim Smyczek

== Finals ==
=== Singles ===
(Latvia) Ernests Gulbis defeated (United States) Mardy Fish, 5–7, 6–4, 6–4

- It was Gulbis' only singles title of the year and the 2nd of his career.

=== Doubles ===
(The Bahamas) Mark Knowles / (Belgium) Xavier Malisse defeated (India) Somdev Devvarman / (Philippines) Treat Conrad Huey, 7–6^{(7–3)}, 7–6^{(12–10)}

== Notes ==
- As a part of this year's tournament, "An Evening with Betty White" was presented prior to the tournament on July 22 at UCLA's Royce Hall.
- July 30, 2011 – Peter Fleming, the Farmers Classic 1979 singles and 1983 doubles champion, was named 2011 Tournament Honoree.
- August 3, 2011 – "An Evening with Coldplay" concert.
