= 2015 Nielsen Pro Tennis Championship =

- Date: 6–12 July
- Edition: 24th
- Surface: Hard
- Location: Winnetka, United States

Champions

Singles
- (India) Somdev Devvarman

Doubles
- (Sweden) Johan Brunström / (United States) Nicholas Monroe
- Nielsen Pro Tennis Championship

The 2015 Nielsen Pro Tennis Championship was a professional tennis tournament played on hard courts. It was the 24th edition of the tournament which was part of the 2015 ATP Challenger Tour. It took place in Winnetka, Illinois, between 6 and 12 July 2015.

== Singles main-draw entrants ==
=== Seeds ===
Country	Player	Rank^{1}	Seed
JPN	Tatsuma Ito	94	1
UKR	Illya Marchenko	106	2
SLO	Blaž Kavčič	114	3
USA	Austin Krajicek	121	4
USA	Ryan Harrison	124	5
JPN	Yūichi Sugita	125	6
IND	Somdev Devvarman	136	7
USA	Connor Smith	139	8

- ^{1} Rankings are as of June 23, 2015.

=== Other entrants ===
The following players received wildcards into the singles main draw:

- (United States) Tom Fawcett
- (United States) Jared Hiltzik
- (United States) Stefan Kozlov
- (United States) Mackenzie McDonald

The following player received entry as an alternate into the singles main draw:

- (Canada) Frank Dancevic
- (United States) Tennys Sandgren

The following players received entry from the qualifying draw:

- (United States) Marcos Giron
- (United States) Nicolas Meister
- (United States) Dennis Nevolo
- (Australia) Andrew Whittington

The following player received entry as a lucky loser:

- (United States) Ernesto Escobedo

== Champions ==
=== Singles ===
- (India) Somdev Devvarman def. (United States) Daniel Nguyen, 7–5, 4–6, 7–6^{(7–5)}

=== Doubles ===
- (Sweden) Johan Brunström / (United States) Nicholas Monroe def. (United States) Sekou Bangoura / (Canada) Frank Dancevic, 4–6, 6–3, [10–8]
