= 2016 KPN Bangkok Open – Singles =

Singles
- 2016 KPN Bangkok Open

Final
- Champion: (Russia) Mikhail Youzhny
- Runner-up: (Japan) Go Soeda
- Score: 6–3, 6–4

Events
Singles	Doubles
← 2015 ·	KPN Bangkok Open	· 2017 →

Yūichi Sugita was the defending champion, but lost in the quarterfinals to Marco Chiudinelli.
Third Seed Mikhail Youzhny claimed his third ATP Challenger Tour title, beating Go Soeda 6–3, 6–4

== Seeds ==
1. (Japan) Tatsuma Ito (first round)
2. (Japan) Yūichi Sugita (quarterfinals)
3. (Russia) Mikhail Youzhny (champion)
4. (Belgium) Kimmer Coppejans (quarterfinals)
5. (Japan) Go Soeda (final)
6. (Portugal) Gastão Elias (first round)
7. (Russia) Konstantin Kravchuk (semifinals)
8. (Brazil) André Ghem (first round)

== Draw ==
=== Key ===
- Q = Qualifier
- WC = Wild card
- LL = Lucky loser
- Alt = Alternate
- SE = Special exempt
- PR = Protected ranking
- ITF = ITF entry
- JE = Junior exempt
- w/o = Walkover
- r = Retired
- d = Defaulted
- SR = Special ranking

=== Finals ===
Semifinals
PR	(Switzerland) Marco Chiudinelli	3	6^{9}
3	(Russia) Mikhail Youzhny	6	7^{11}
5	(Japan) Go Soeda	7^{7}	6
7	(Russia) Konstantin Kravchuk	6^{4}	1

Final
3	(Russia) Mikhail Youzhny	6	6
5	(Japan) Go Soeda	3	4

=== Top half ===
First round
1	(Japan) T Ito	2	3
PR	(Switzerland) M Chiudinelli	6	6
(Italy) R Marcora	3
(China) Y Bai	2^{r}
(Japan) Y Uchiyama	6	6
WC	(Thailand) J Navasirisomboon	4	4
(France) S Robert	6^{3}	7^{7}	6
8	(Brazil) A Ghem	7^{7}	6^{4}	3
3	(Russia) M Youzhny	6	6
(Czech Republic) A Pavlásek	3	2
(Chinese Taipei) T Chen	4	3
(Israel) A Weintraub	6	6
(Belarus) E Gerasimov	5
Q	(Belarus) I Ivashka	3^{r}
Q	(Kazakhstan) D Popko	5	6	6
6	(Portugal) G Elias	7	3	2

Second round
PR	(Switzerland) M Chiudinelli	6	4	6
(Italy) R Marcora	1	6	2
(Japan) Y Uchiyama	6	7^{8}
(France) S Robert	2	6^{6}
3	(Russia) M Youzhny	7^{7}	6
(Israel) A Weintraub	6^{3}	3
(Belarus) E Gerasimov	6	6
Q	(Kazakhstan) D Popko	4	3

Quarterfinals
PR	(Switzerland) M Chiudinelli	7	6
(Japan) Y Uchiyama	5	3
3	(Russia) M Youzhny	6	5	6
(Belarus) E Gerasimov	4	7	3

Semifinals
PR	(Switzerland) M Chiudinelli	3	6^{9}
3	(Russia) M Youzhny	6	7^{11}

=== Bottom half ===
First round
5	(Japan) G Soeda	2	6	6
(France) D Guez	6	4	1
(Croatia) F Škugor	6	3
(China) D Wu	4	0^{r}
(Austria) M Linzer	7^{7}	3	6^{5}
(Belgium) Y Mertens	6^{2}	6	7^{7}
WC	(Thailand) Phassawit Burapharitta	3	5
4	(Belgium) K Coppejans	6	7
7	(Russia) K Kravchuk	6	6
WC	(Thailand) Nattan Benjasupawan	0	0
(Chinese Taipei) T-h Yang	6	6
WC	(Thailand) K Wachiramanowong	3	4
Q	(Austria) M Neuchrist	4	7	2
Q	(Chinese Taipei) J Jung	6	5	6
(South Korea) D-h Lee	3	6	3
2	(Japan) Y Sugita	6	2	6

Second round
5	(Japan) G Soeda	6	6
(Croatia) F Škugor	2	4
(Belgium) Y Mertens	6^{5}	5
4	(Belgium) K Coppejans	7^{7}	7
7	(Russia) K Kravchuk
(Chinese Taipei) T-h Yang	w/o
Q	(Chinese Taipei) J Jung	3	4
2	(Japan) Y Sugita	6	6

Quarterfinals
5	(Japan) G Soeda	6	2	6
4	(Belgium) K Coppejans	3	6	1
7	(Russia) K Kravchuk	4	6	6
2	(Japan) Y Sugita	6	2	4

Semifinals
5	(Japan) G Soeda	7^{7}	6
7	(Russia) K Kravchuk	6^{4}	1
