= 2009 LA Tennis Open =

- Date: July 27 – August 2
- Edition: 83rd
- Category: World Tour 250 series
- Draw: 28S / 16D
- Prize money: $550,000
- Surface: Hard / outdoor
- Location: Los Angeles, United States
- Venue: Los Angeles Tennis Center

Champions

Singles
- (United States) Sam Querrey

Doubles
- (United States) Bob Bryan / (United States) Mike Bryan
← 2008 ·	Los Angeles Open	· 2010 →

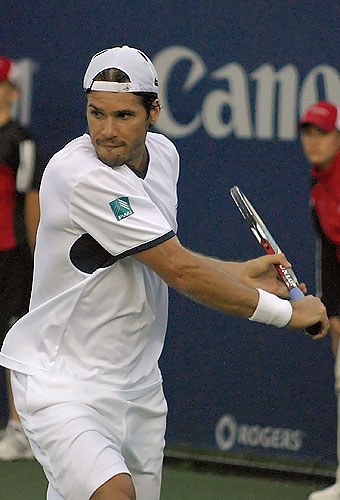
Wimbledon Semifinalist Tommy Haas headlined in Los Angeles.

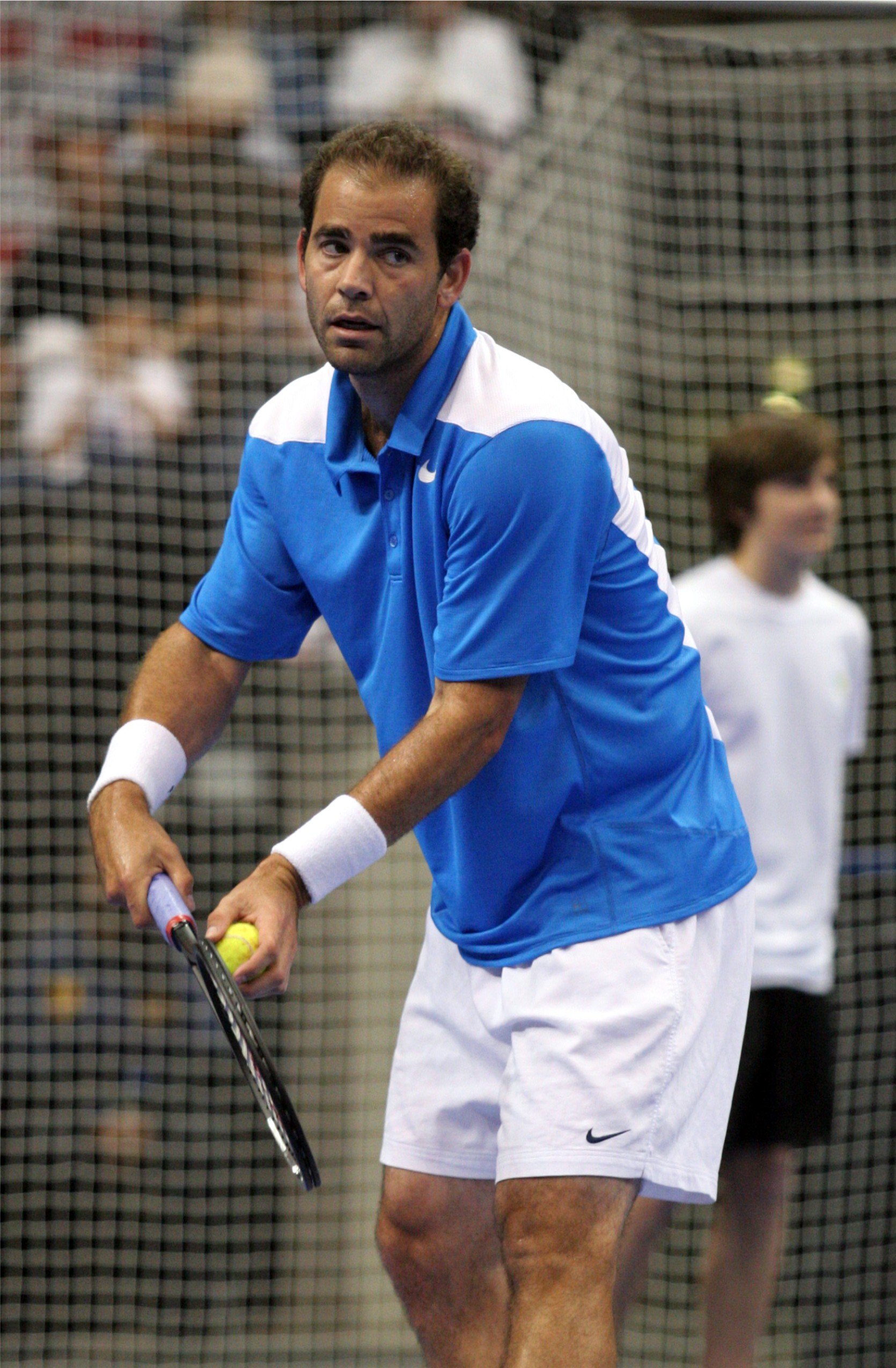
Fourteen-time Grand Slam champion Pete Sampras kicked off the tournament with an exhibition match against Marat Safin.

The 2009 LA Tennis Open (also known as the LA Tennis Open presented by Farmers Insurance Group for sponsorship reasons) was a tennis tournament played on outdoor hard courts. It was the 83rd edition of the event known that year as the LA Tennis Open and was part of the ATP World Tour 250 series of the 2009 ATP World Tour. It took place at the Los Angeles Tennis Center in Los Angeles, United States, from July 27 through August 2, 2009. The LA Tennis Open was the second ATP stop of the 2009 US Open Series.

In addition to the singles and doubles events, a Legends Invitational Singles competition was held, featuring Michael Chang, Stefan Edberg and Jim Courier, winner of the competition at the 2008 Countrywide Classic. The LA Tennis Open kicked off with the "Millennium Challenge" featuring Pete Sampras returning to the University of California, Los Angeles (UCLA) to play Marat Safin in a rematch of their 2000 US Open final, won by the Russian 6–4, 6–3, 6–3. Fourteen-time Grand Slam champion Sampras, who held the World No. 1 ranking for a record 286 weeks, was recognized as the 2009 LA Tennis Open Tournament Honoree.

== ATP entrants ==
=== Seeds ===
Player	Nation	Ranking*	Seeding
Tommy Haas	GER	20	1
Mardy Fish	USA	22	2
Dmitry Tursunov	RUS	27	3
Dudi Sela	ISR	29	4
Igor Kunitsyn	RUS	36	5
Sam Querrey	USA	37	6
Benjamin Becker	GER	45	7
Marat Safin	RUS	54	8

*Seedings based on the July 20, 2009 rankings.

=== Other entrants ===
The following players received wildcards into the singles main draw

- (United States) Taylor Dent
- (United States) Jesse Levine
- (Australia) Chris Guccione

The following players received special exemptions into the singles main draw

- (United States) Robby Ginepri
- (Canada) Frank Dancevic

The following players received entry from the qualifying draw:

- (France) Josselin Ouanna
- (Australia) Carsten Ball
- (United States) Ryan Sweeting
- (India) Somdev Devvarman

== Finals ==
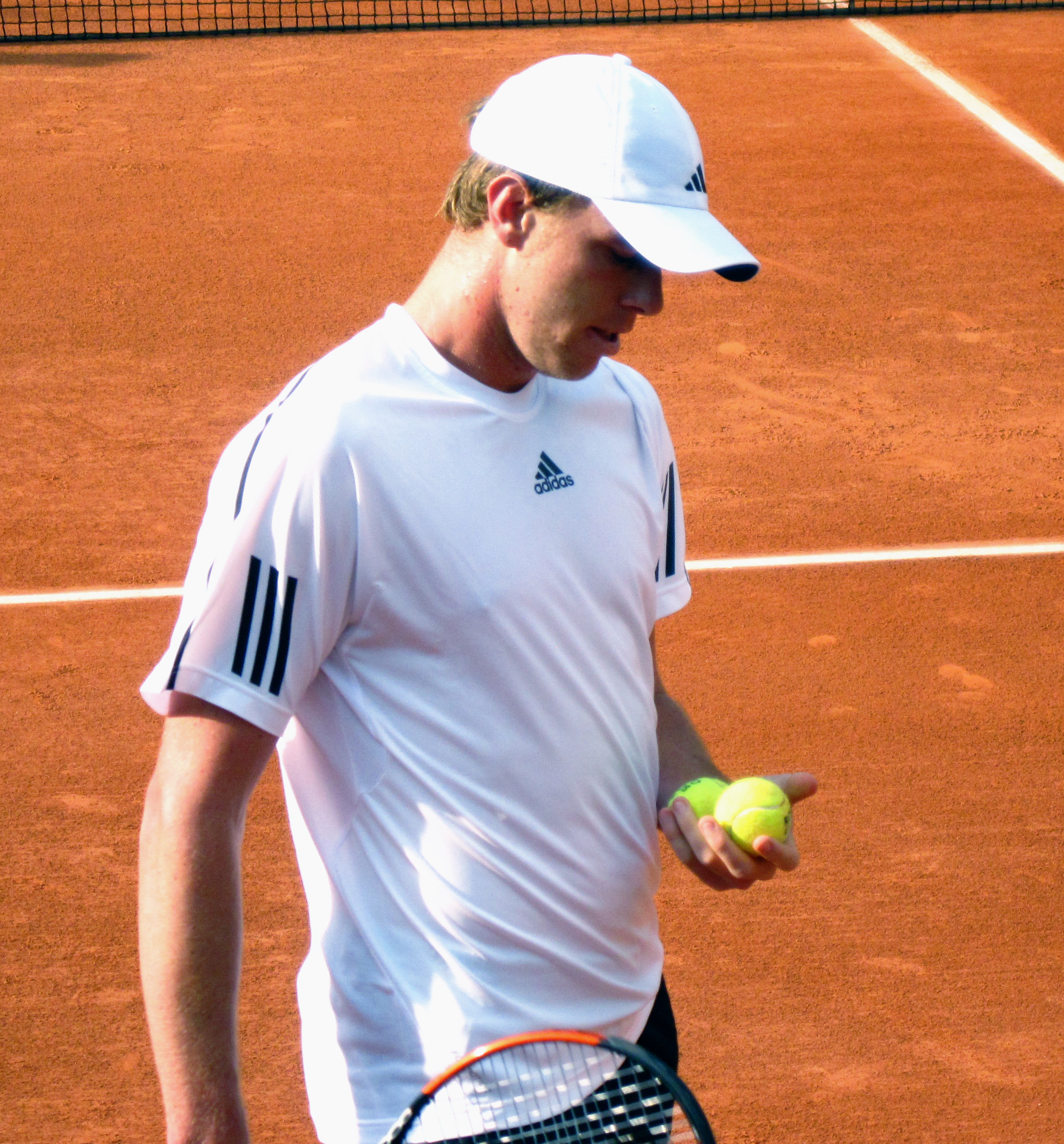
Sam Querrey, singles champion

=== Singles ===
(United States) Sam Querrey defeated (Australia) Carsten Ball, 6–4, 3–6, 6–1

- It was Querrey's first title of the year and second of his career.

=== Doubles ===
(United States) Bob Bryan / (United States) Mike Bryan defeated (Germany) Benjamin Becker / (Germany) Frank Moser, 6–4, 7–6^{(7–2)}
