= 2012 Farmers Classic – Doubles =

Doubles
- 2012 Farmers Classic

Final
- Champions: (Belgium) Ruben Bemelmans (Belgium) Xavier Malisse
- Runners-up: (United Kingdom) Jamie Delgado (United Kingdom) Ken Skupski
- Score: 7–6^{(7–5)}, 4–6, [10–7]

Details
- Draw: 16
- Seeds: 4

Events
Singles	Doubles
- Los Angeles Open

The 2012 Farmers Classic Doubles was a men's tennis tournament played on outdoor hard courts in Los Angeles, California.

Xavier Malisse, with fellow countryman Ruben Bemelmans, defended his title, defeating Jamie Delgado and Ken Skupski 7–6^{(7–5)}, 4–6, [10–7] in the final. Mark Knowles and Malisse were the defending champions but Knowles decided not to participate.

== Seeds ==
1. (Mexico) Santiago González / (United States) Scott Lipsky (quarterfinals)
2. (Australia) Colin Ebelthite / (United Kingdom) Jonathan Marray (first round)
3. (United Kingdom) Jamie Delgado / (United Kingdom) Ken Skupski (final)
4. (Australia) Matthew Ebden / (United Kingdom) Dominic Inglot (first round)

== Draw ==
Key

- Q = Qualifier
- WC = Wild card
- LL = Lucky loser
- Alt = Alternate
- ITF = ITF entry
- PR = Protected ranking
- SR = Special ranking
- SE = Special exempt
- JE = Junior exempt
- JR = Junior Accelerator Programme entrant
- CO = College Accelerator Programme entrant
- NG = Next Gen Accelerator Program entrant
- w/o = Walkover
- r = Retired
- d = Defaulted

=== Draw ===
First round
1	(Mexico) S González (United States) S Lipsky	6	6
Alt	(Australia) C Guccione (Australia) M Matosevic	4	4
(Belgium) R Bemelmans (Belgium) X Malisse	6	7^{9}
(Italy) P Lorenzi (France) B Paire	2	6^{7}
4	(Australia) M Ebden (United Kingdom) D Inglot	3	3
WC	(United States) S Johnson (United States) S Querrey	6	6
(South Africa) R Klaasen (Canada) A Shamasdin	6	6
(Italy) F Cipolla (Argentina) L Mayer	4	2
(United States) R Ram (United States) M Russell	7^{7}	6
WC	(United States) M Giron (United States) N Meister	6^{3}	2
(United States) J Cerretani (Netherlands) I Sijsling	4	6	[10]
3	(United Kingdom) J Delgado (United Kingdom) K Skupski	6	2	[12]
(Uruguay) M Felder (Israel) D Sela	5	5
(France) O Charroin (United States) JP Fruttero	7	7
(Germany) T Kamke (Germany) B Phau	6	1	[11]
2	(Australia) C Ebelthite (United Kingdom) J Marray	2	6	[9]

Quarterfinals
1	(Mexico) S Gonzalez (United States) S Lipsky	3	5
(Belgium) R Bemelmans (Belgium) X Malisse	6	7
WC	(United States) S Johnson (United States) S Querrey	7^{7}	6
(South Africa) R Klaasen (Canada) A Shamasdin	6^{5}	4
(United States) R Ram (United States) M Russell
3	(United Kingdom) J Delgado (United Kingdom) K Skupski	w/o
(France) O Charroin (United States) JP Fruttero	4	6	[5]
(Germany) T Kamke (Germany) B Phau	6	4	[10]

Semifinals
(Belgium) R Bemelmans (Belgium) X Malisse	6	6
WC	(United States) S Johnson (United States) S Querrey	4	4
3	(United Kingdom) J Delgado (United Kingdom) K Skupski	7^{7}	7^{10}
(Germany) T Kamke (Germany) B Phau	6^{4}	6^{8}

Final
(Belgium) R Bemelmans (Belgium) X Malisse	7^{7}	4	[10]
3	(United Kingdom) J Delgado (United Kingdom) K Skupski	6^{5}	6	[7]
