= 2009 LA Tennis Open – Doubles =

Doubles
- 2009 LA Tennis Open

Final
- Champion: (United States) Bob Bryan (United States) Mike Bryan
- Runner-up: (Germany) Benjamin Becker (Germany) Frank Moser
- Score: 6–4, 7–6^{(7–2)}

Details
- Draw: 16
- Seeds: 4

Events
Singles	Doubles
- Los Angeles Open

Rohan Bopanna and Eric Butorac were the defending champions, but Bopanna did not participate that year.
Butorac partnered with Scott Lipsky, but lost in the first round to Denis Istomin and Leonardo Mayer.
Bob Bryan and Mike Bryan won in the final 6–4, 7–6^{(7–2)} against Benjamin Becker and Frank Moser.

== Seeds ==
1. (United States) Bob Bryan / (United States) Mike Bryan (champions)
2. (Brazil) Bruno Soares / (Zimbabwe) Kevin Ullyett (first round)
3. (Czech Republic) Martin Damm / (Sweden) Robert Lindstedt (first round)
4. (Australia) Stephen Huss / (United Kingdom) Ross Hutchins (first round)

== Draw ==
Key

- Q = Qualifier
- WC = Wild card
- LL = Lucky loser
- Alt = Alternate
- ITF = ITF entry
- PR = Protected ranking
- SR = Special ranking
- SE = Special exempt
- JE = Junior exempt
- JR = Junior Accelerator Programme entrant
- CO = College Accelerator Programme entrant
- NG = Next Gen Accelerator Program entrant
- w/o = Walkover
- r = Retired
- d = Defaulted

=== Draw ===
First round
1	(United States) B Bryan (United States) M Bryan	7	6
WC	(Australia) C Ball (United States) K Van't Hof	5	2
WC	(Cyprus) M Baghdatis (Israel) D Sela	7^{8}	2	[9]
(Russia) I Kunitsyn (Russia) M Safin	6^{6}	6	[11]
3	(Czech Republic) M Damm (Sweden) R Lindstedt	4	4
(South Africa) J Coetzee (Israel) J Erlich	6	6
(United States) R Ginepri (Australia) J Kerr	3	2
(Brazil) M Melo (Brazil) A Sá	6	6
(Germany) B Becker (Germany) F Moser	w/o
(United States) J Isner (United States) S Querrey
(Chinese Taipei) Y-h Lu (Serbia) D Vemić	6	6^{4}	[10]
4	(Australia) S Huss (United Kingdom) R Hutchins	3	7^{7}	[6]
(United States) E Butorac (United States) S Lipsky	6^{5}	7^{7}	[4]
(Uzbekistan) D Istomin (Argentina) L Mayer	7^{7}	6^{4}	[10]
(Latvia) E Gulbis (Russia) D Tursunov	6	6
2	(Brazil) B Soares (Zimbabwe) K Ullyett	2	4

Quarterfinals
1	(United States) B Bryan (United States) M Bryan	6	6
(Russia) I Kunitsyn (Russia) M Safin	3	2
(South Africa) J Coetzee (Israel) J Erlich	1	6^{9}
(Brazil) M Melo (Brazil) A Sá	6	7^{11}
(Germany) B Becker (Germany) F Moser	6	2	[10]
(Chinese Taipei) Y-h Lu (Serbia) D Vemić	4	6	8
(Uzbekistan) D Istomin (Argentina) L Mayer	7	7^{10}
(Latvia) E Gulbis (Russia) D Tursunov	5	6^{8}

Semifinals
1	(United States) B Bryan (United States) M Bryan	6	6
(Brazil) M Melo (Brazil) A Sá	2	4
(Germany) B Becker (Germany) F Moser	6	6
(Uzbekistan) D Istomin (Argentina) L Mayer	3	3

Final
1	(United States) B Bryan (United States) M Bryan	6	7^{7}
(Germany) B Becker (Germany) F Moser	4	6^{2}
