= 2012 Farmers Classic =

- Date: July 23–29
- Edition: 86th
- Category: World Tour 250
- Draw: 28S / 16D
- Prize money: $557,550
- Surface: Hard / outdoor
- Location: Los Angeles, California; United States
- Venue: Los Angeles Tennis Center

Champions

Singles
- (United States) Sam Querrey

Doubles
- (Belgium) Ruben Bemelmans / (Belgium) Xavier Malisse
- Los Angeles Open

The 2012 Farmers Classic, presented by Mercedes-Benz, was a men's tennis tournament played on outdoor hard courts in Los Angeles. It was the 86th edition of the Los Angeles Open, and was part of the Emirates Airline US Open Series of the 2012 ATP World Tour. It took place at the Los Angeles Tennis Center on the campus of UCLA, from July 23 through July 29, 2012, with total player compensation in excess of $1 million. The events were televised by ESPN2 and the Tennis Channel.

Defending champion, second-seeded Sam Querrey, who grew up in nearby Thousand Oaks, defeated Ričardas Berankis for his third Los Angeles title in four years on July 29, 2012. Xavier Malisse teamed up with Ruben Bemelmans this year to win the doubles championship. Querrey would also join fellow Americans, Andre Agassi and Jimmy Connors as the only three men to win 3 or more titles in the Open Era. The 2012 tournament marked the last time an ATP World Tour tournament would be held in Los Angeles.

== Singles main-draw entrants ==
=== Singles seeds ===
Country	Player	Rank^{1}	Seed
FRA	Benoît Paire	47	1
USA	Sam Querrey	55	2
ARG	Leonardo Mayer	64	3
FRA	Nicolas Mahut	66	4
BEL	Xavier Malisse	71	5
AUS	Marinko Matosevic	73	6
GER	Björn Phau	76	7
USA	Brian Baker	79	8

- ^{1} Seedings based on the rankings of July 16, 2012

=== Other entrants ===
The following players received wildcards into the singles main draw:

- (United States) Brian Baker
- (United States) Steve Johnson
- (United States) Jack Sock

The following players received entry from the qualifying draw:

- (Lithuania) Ričardas Berankis
- (Australia) Chris Guccione
- (United States) Bradley Klahn
- (United States) Nicolas Meister

=== Withdrawals ===
- (Tunisia) Malek Jaziri
- (Slovakia) Lukáš Lacko

== Doubles main-draw entrants ==
=== Seeds ===
Country	Player	Country	Player	Rank^{1}	Seed
MEX	Santiago González	USA	Scott Lipsky	68	1
AUS	Colin Ebelthite	GBR	Jonathan Marray	129	2
GBR	Jamie Delgado	GBR	Ken Skupski	150	3
AUS	Matthew Ebden	GBR	Dominic Inglot	153	4

- Rankings are as of July 16, 2012

=== Other entrants ===
The following pairs received wildcards into the doubles main draw:

- (United States) Marcos Giron / (United States) Nicolas Meister
- (United States) Steve Johnson / (United States) Sam Querrey

The following pair received entry as alternates:

- (Australia) Chris Guccione / (Australia) Marinko Matosevic

=== Withdrawals ===
- (United States) Ryan Sweeting (back injury)

=== Retirements ===
- (United States) Michael Russell (back injury)

== Finals ==
=== Singles ===
- (United States) Sam Querrey defeated (Lithuania) Ričardas Berankis, 6–0, 6–2

=== Doubles ===
- (Belgium) Ruben Bemelmans / (Belgium) Xavier Malisse defeated (United Kingdom) Jamie Delgado / (United Kingdom) Ken Skupski, 7–6^{(7–5)}, 4–6, [10–7]
