= 2015 Chang-Sat Bangkok Open =

- Date: 31 August – 6 September
- Edition: 7th
- Surface: Hard
- Location: Bangkok, Thailand

Champions

Singles
- (Japan) Yūichi Sugita

Doubles
- (China) Bai Yan / (Italy) Riccardo Ghedin
← 2014 ·	Chang-Sat Bangkok Open	· 2016 →

The 2015 Chang-Sat Bangkok Open was a professional tennis tournament played on hard courts. It was the seventh edition of the tournament which was part of the 2015 ATP Challenger Tour. It took place in Bangkok, Thailand between 31 August and 6 September 2015.

== Singles main-draw entrants ==
=== Seeds ===
Country	Player	Rank^{1}	Seed
JPN	Tatsuma Ito	93	1
IND	Somdev Devvarman	152	2
JPN	Yūichi Sugita	156	3
BEL	Niels Desein	177	4
AUS	Jordan Thompson	193	5
TPE	Chen Ti	194	6
USA	Alexander Sarkissian	207	7
JPN	Yasutaka Uchiyama	213	8

- ^{1} Rankings are as of August 17, 2015.

=== Other entrants ===
The following players received wildcards into the singles main draw:

- (Thailand) Phassawit Burapharitta
- (Thailand) Puriwat Chatpatcharoen
- (Thailand) Pruchya Isaro
- (Thailand) Kittipong Wachiramanowong

The following players received entry from the qualifying draw:

- (Australia) Oliver Anderson
- (Indonesia) Christopher Rungkat
- (New Zealand) Finn Tearney
- (Australia) Andrew Whittington

== Champions ==
=== Singles ===
- (Japan) Yūichi Sugita def. (Argentina) Marco Trungelliti 6–4, 6–2

=== Doubles ===
- (China) Bai Yan / (Italy) Riccardo Ghedin def. (Chinese Taipei) Chen Ti / (China) Li Zhe 6–2, 7–5
