= 2011 Farmers Classic – Singles =

Singles
- 2011 Farmers Classic

Final
- Champion: (Latvia) Ernests Gulbis
- Runner-up: (United States) Mardy Fish
- Score: 5–7, 6–4, 6–4

Details
- Draw: 28 (4 Q / 3 WC )
- Seeds: 8

Events
Singles	Doubles
- Los Angeles Open

Sam Querrey was the defending champion but decided not to participate.

In the final, Ernests Gulbis defeated Mardy Fish in a close match, 5–7, 6–4, 6–4. He became the first unseeded player to win this tournament since Radek Štěpánek in 2007.

== Seeds ==
The first four seeds received a bye into the second round.

1. (United States) Mardy Fish (final)
2. (Argentina) Juan Martín del Potro (quarterfinals)
3. (Cyprus) Marcos Baghdatis (second round)
4. (Brazil) Thomaz Bellucci (quarterfinals)
5. (Belgium) Xavier Malisse (first round)
6. (Russia) Dmitry Tursunov (first round)
7. (Bulgaria) Grigor Dimitrov (second round)
8. (Russia) Igor Kunitsyn (quarterfinals)

== Draw ==
Key

- Q = Qualifier
- WC = Wild card
- LL = Lucky loser
- Alt = Alternate
- ITF = ITF entry
- PR = Protected ranking
- SR = Special ranking
- SE = Special exempt
- JE = Junior exempt
- JR = Junior Accelerator Programme entrant
- CO = College Accelerator Programme entrant
- NG = Next Gen Accelerator Program entrant
- w/o = Walkover
- r = Retired
- d = Defaulted

=== Finals ===
Semifinals
1	(United States) Mardy Fish	6	4	7^{7}
SE	(United States) Ryan Harrison	0	6	6^{3}
(United States) Alex Bogomolov Jr.	2	6^{4}
(Latvia) Ernests Gulbis	6	7^{7}

Final
1	(United States) Mardy Fish	7	4	4
(Latvia) Ernests Gulbis	5	6	6

=== Top half ===
First round
(Luxembourg) G Müller	2	6	6
WC	(United States) S Johnson	6	3	4
(India) S Devvarman	4	6^{6}
(United States) R Sweeting	6	7^{8}
(Chile) F González	4	3
8	(Russia) I Kunitsyn	6	6
WC	(United States) R Ginepri	4	5
(Chinese Taipei) Y-h Lu	6	7
SE	(United States) R Harrison	6^{4}	7	6
(Lithuania) R Berankis	7^{7}	5	3
(United States) M Russell	6^{5}	6	6
6	(Russia) D Tursunov	7^{7}	0	2

Second round
1	(United States) M Fish	7^{7}	6
(Luxembourg) G Müller	6^{1}	1
(United States) R Sweeting	6^{4}	6^{6}
8	(Russia) I Kunitsyn	7^{7}	7^{8}
3	(Cyprus) M Baghdatis	3	4
(Chinese Taipei) Y-h Lu	6	6
SE	(United States) R Harrison	6	6
(United States) M Russell	3	4

Quarterfinals
1	(United States) M Fish	6	6
8	(Russia) I Kunitsyn	2	4
(Chinese Taipei) Y-h Lu	6	3	4
SE	(United States) R Harrison	3	6	6

Semifinals
1	(United States) M Fish	6	4	7^{7}
SE	(United States) R Harrison	0	6	6^{3}

=== Bottom half ===
First round
7	(Bulgaria) G Dimitrov	6	6
WC	(Germany) T Haas	3	2
Q	(Australia) G Jones	6	1	1
(United States) A Bogomolov Jr.	4	6	6
(Colombia) A Falla	6	6
Q	(Lithuania) L Grigelis	2	4
5	(Belgium) X Malisse	6	3	6^{5}
(Latvia) E Gulbis	2	6	7^{7}
Q	(United States) T Smyczek	6	1	3
Q	(United States) D Kosakowski	2	6	6
(United States) J Blake	6	6
(Germany) M Berrer	2	3

Second round
7	(Bulgaria) G Dimitrov	4	3
(United States) A Bogomolov Jr.	6	6
(Colombia) A Falla	0	1
4	(Brazil) T Bellucci	6	6
(Latvia) E Gulbis	6	6
Q	(United States) D Kosakowski	2	4
(United States) J Blake	4	6^{3}
2	(Argentina) JM del Potro	6	7^{7}

Quarterfinals
(United States) A Bogomolov Jr.	1	6	6
4	(Brazil) T Bellucci	6	4	1
(Latvia) E Gulbis	6	6
2	(Argentina) JM del Potro	2	4

Semifinals
(United States) A Bogomolov Jr.	2	6^{4}
(Latvia) E Gulbis	6	7^{7}
