= 2009 LA Tennis Open – Singles =

Singles
- 2009 LA Tennis Open

Final
- Champion: (United States) Sam Querrey
- Runner-up: (Australia) Carsten Ball
- Score: 6–4, 3–6, 6–1

Details
- Draw: 28 (4 Q / 3 WC )
- Seeds: 8

Events
Singles	Doubles
- Los Angeles Open

Juan Martín del Potro was the defending champion, but chose not to participate that year.

Sam Querrey won the title, defeating Carsten Ball 6–4, 3–6, 6–1 in the final.

== Seeds ==
The top four seeds receive a bye into the second round.

1. (Germany) Tommy Haas (semifinals)
2. (United States) Mardy Fish (quarterfinals, withdrew because of abdominal strain)
3. (Russia) Dmitry Tursunov (second round, retired because of a left ankle injury)
4. (Israel) Dudi Sela (quarterfinals)
5. (Russia) Igor Kunitsyn (second round)
6. (United States) Sam Querrey (champion)
7. (Germany) Benjamin Becker (first round)
8. (Russia) Marat Safin (quarterfinals)

== Main draw ==
Key

- Q = Qualifier
- WC = Wild card
- LL = Lucky loser
- Alt = Alternate
- ITF = ITF entry
- PR = Protected ranking
- SR = Special ranking
- SE = Special exempt
- JE = Junior exempt
- JR = Junior Accelerator Programme entrant
- CO = College Accelerator Programme entrant
- NG = Next Gen Accelerator Program entrant
- w/o = Walkover
- r = Retired
- d = Defaulted

=== Finals ===
Semifinals
1	(Germany) Tommy Haas	3	5
6	(United States) Sam Querrey	6	7
Q	(Australia) Carsten Ball	7	7^{7}
(Argentina) Leonardo Mayer	5	6^{3}

Final
6	(United States) Sam Querrey	6	3	6
Q	(Australia) Carsten Ball	4	6	1

=== Top half ===
First round
WC	(United States) J Levine	6	6
(United States) B Reynolds	2	3
(Chinese Taipei) Y-h Lu	5	2
(Latvia) E Gulbis	7	6
SE	(United States) R Ginepri	6	3	4
8	(Russia) M Safin	3	6	6
(United States) V Spadea	0	0
(United States) R Kendrick	6	6
WC	(United States) T Dent	4	6	3
Q	(United States) R Sweeting	6	2	6
(Uzbekistan) D Istomin	2	0
6	(United States) S Querrey	6	6

Second round
1	(Germany) T Haas	6	6
WC	(United States) J Levine	1	3
(Latvia) E Gulbis	6	3	4
8	(Russia) M Safin	2	6	6
4	(Israel) D Sela	6	3	6
(United States) R Kendrick	4	6	1
Q	(United States) R Sweeting	3	7^{7}	3
6	(United States) S Querrey	6	6^{5}	6

Quarterfinals
1	(Germany) T Haas	7^{7}	6
8	(Russia) M Safin	6^{3}	2
4	(Israel) D Sela	3	5
6	(United States) S Querrey	6	7

Semifinals
1	(Germany) T Haas	3	5
6	(United States) S Querrey	6	7

=== Bottom half ===
First round
7	(Germany) B Becker	6^{8}	6^{3}
(United States) J Isner	7^{10}	7^{7}
SE	(Canada) F Dancevic	6^{3}	3
(Cyprus) M Baghdatis	7^{7}	6
Q	(Australia) C Ball	6	7^{8}
(France) M Gicquel	2	6^{6}
5	(Russia) I Kunitsyn	7	6
Q	(India) S Devvarman	5	2
(Argentina) L Mayer	6	6
Q	(France) J Ouanna	2	3
WC	(Australia) C Guccione	6	6
(United States) K Kim	1	4

Second round
(United States) J Isner	6	7^{13}
(Cyprus) M Baghdatis	3	6^{11}
Q	(Australia) C Ball	6	0
3	(Russia) D Tursunov	4	1^{r}
5	(Russia) I Kunitsyn	6^{5}	7^{9}	3
(Argentina) L Mayer	7^{7}	6^{7}	6
WC	(Australia) C Guccione	7^{7}	6^{12}	4
2	(United States) M Fish	6^{3}	7^{14}	6

Quarterfinals
(United States) J Isner	4	4
Q	(Australia) C Ball	6	6
(Argentina) L Mayer	w/o
2	(United States) M Fish

Semifinals
Q	(Australia) C Ball	7	7^{7}
(Argentina) L Mayer	5	6^{3}
