= 2010 Farmers Classic =

- Date: July 26 – August 1
- Edition: 84th
- Category: World Tour 250
- Draw: 28S / 16D
- Prize money: $619,500
- Surface: Hard / outdoor
- Location: Los Angeles, United States
- Venue: Los Angeles Tennis Center

Champions

Singles
- (United States) Sam Querrey

Doubles
- (United States) Bob Bryan / (United States) Mike Bryan
← 2009 ·	Los Angeles Open	· 2011 →

The 2010 Farmers Classic, presented by Mercedes-Benz, was a men's tennis tournament played on outdoor hard courts. It was the 84th edition of the Los Angeles Open, and was part of the Olympus US Open Series of the 2010 ATP World Tour. It took place at the Los Angeles Tennis Center in Los Angeles, United States, from July 26 through August 1, 2010. Second-seeded Sam Querrey defeated first-seeded Andy Murray to win his second consecutive singles title at the event. Bob and Mike Bryan won the doubles championship over Eric Butorac and Jean-Julien Rojer, who was playing on his college court. It marked the first time in the 84-year history of the tournament that both the singles and doubles championships were successfully defended. The twin brothers also set the record of 62 career doubles titles on the ATP Tour.

Jim Courier was the Tournament Honoree in a special ceremony on opening night, Monday, July 26. This year's Stars Under the Stars gala featured Andre Agassi vs. John McEnroe, along with Jim Courier, Michael Chang and Pam Shriver; comedian Jon Lovitz and rock star Gavin Rossdale on Saturday, July 24. The tournament also featured the Starry Night with Keith Urban and the Avett Brothers on July 23. Additionally, the "KLOS Rocking the Net starring Bret Michaels" show featuring Tesla scheduled for Monday, August 2, at the L.A. Tennis Center was postponed until Sunday, October 24.

The prize money is $111,950 for the singles winner and $34,000 for the doubles winner. Live television coverage was provided by ESPN2 and Tennis Channel.

== ATP entrants ==
=== Seeds ===
Player	Nation	Ranking*	Seeding
Andy Murray	GBR	4	1
Sam Querrey	USA	20	2
Marcos Baghdatis	CYP	25	3
Feliciano López	ESP	26	4
Ernests Gulbis	LAT	28	5
Janko Tipsarević	SRB	45	6
Horacio Zeballos	ARG	47	7
Mardy Fish	USA	49	8

- Seedings based on the July 19, 2010 rankings.

=== Other entrants ===
The following players received wildcards into the singles main draw

- (United States) James Blake
- (United Kingdom) Andy Murray
- (United States) Ryan Sweeting

The following players received special exempt into the singles main draw:

- (South Africa) Kevin Anderson

The following players received entry from the qualifying draw:

- (Serbia) Ilija Bozoljac
- (India) Somdev Devvarman
- (United States) Steve Johnson
- (Ecuador) Giovanni Lapentti (as a Lucky loser)
- (United States) Tim Smyczek

== Finals ==
=== Singles ===
(United States) Sam Querrey defeated (United Kingdom) Andy Murray, 5–7, 7–6^{(7–2)}, 6–3

- It was Querrey's 4th singles title of the year and 6th of his career.

=== Doubles ===
(United States) Bob Bryan / (United States) Mike Bryan defeated (United States) Eric Butorac / (Netherlands Antilles) Jean-Julien Rojer, 6–7^{(6–8)}, 6–2, [10–7]

- Their sixth title at Farmers Classic.

== Notes ==
- Novak Djokovic, Radek Štěpánek, and Mardy Fish (singles) withdrew from the tournament.
