= Carsten Ball =

Australian tennis player (born 1987)

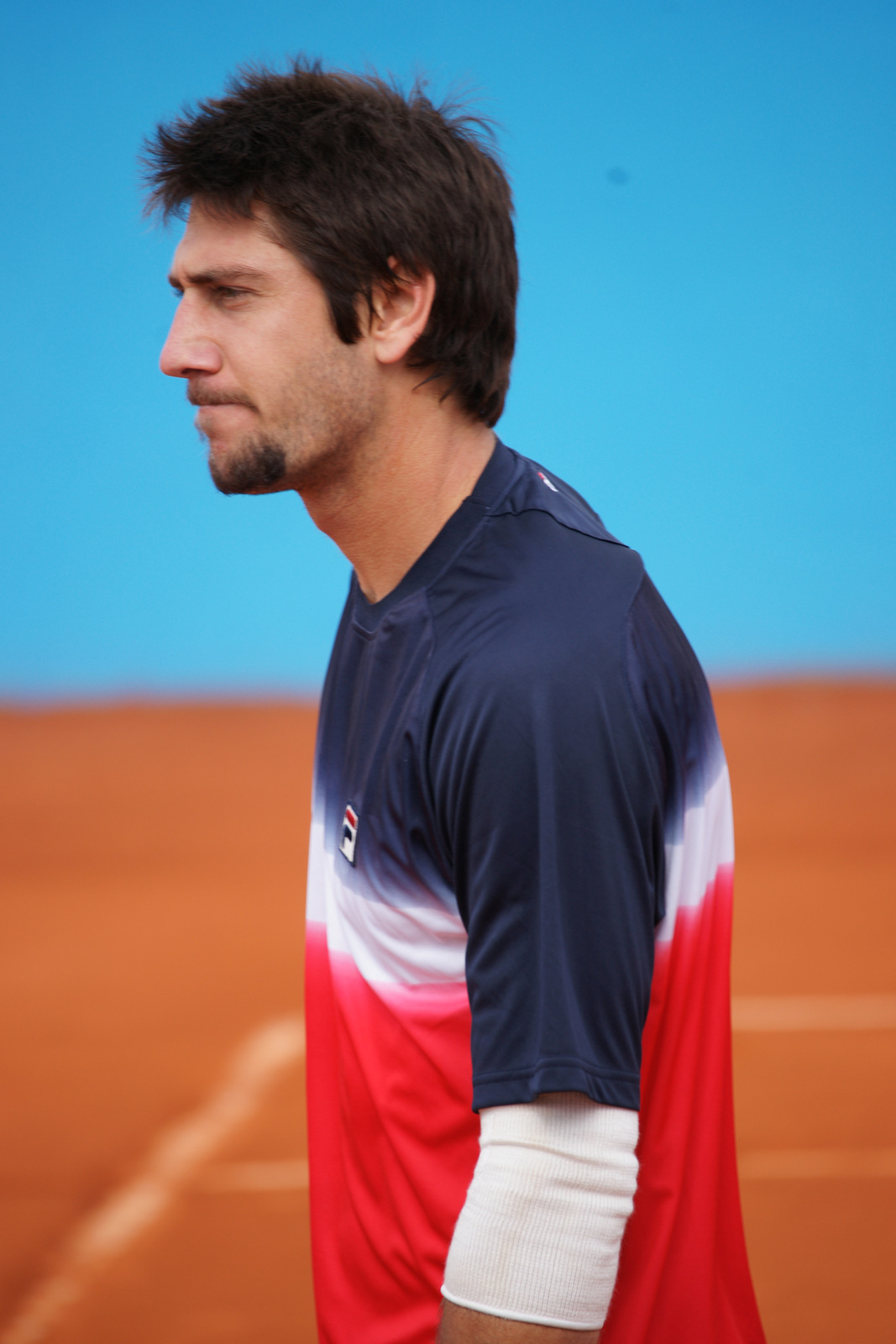
- Carsten Ball at the 2012 Open de Nice Côte d’Azur
- Country (sports): Australia
- Residence: Newport Beach, California, United States
- Born: 20 June 1987 (age 39) Newport Beach, California, U.S.
- Height: 1.98 m (6 ft 6 in)
- Turned pro: 2005
- Retired: 2016
- Plays: Left-handed (two-handed backhand)
- Prize money: $671,061

Singles
- Career record: 11–15
- Career titles: 0
- Highest ranking: No. 108 (26 July 2010)

Grand Slam singles results
- Australian Open: 1R (2009, 2010, 2011)
- French Open: 2R (2010)
- Wimbledon: 1R (2010)
- US Open: 2R (2009, 2010)

Doubles
- Career record: 30–27
- Career titles: 1
- Highest ranking: No. 54 (26 October 2009)

Grand Slam doubles results
- Australian Open: 3R (2008, 2009, 2011)
- French Open: 1R (2010)
- Wimbledon: 3R (2010, 2011)
- US Open: QF (2009)

Carsten Thomas Ball (born 20 June 1987) is an American-Australian retired professional tennis player. Although born and based in the United States, Ball represented Australia on tour.

== Tennis career ==
Carsten Ball was born in Newport Beach, California. His father, Syd Ball, was also a tour tennis player. As a junior tennis player he reached a career high of number 9 in the world. He was based in Newport Beach, with his father as his coach.

Ball has five Futures titles to his credit. His best singles results previously consisted of three runner up appearances in American Challengers in 2008 and 2009. In August 2009, as a qualifier, Ball reached the final of the LA Tennis Open. He lost to sixth-seeded Sam Querrey. Later in August he qualified for the US Open, where he reached the second round, losing to Novak Djokovic in straight sets.

Ball enjoyed considerable success as a doubles player, often partnering with fellow Australian Chris Guccione. Ball and Guccione won back-to-back doubles titles in the 2011 Sacramento Challenger and Tiburon ATP Challenger Tour events, both $100,000 tournaments. After his retirement as a player, he became a coach including working with Tennys Sandgren.

== ATP career finals ==
=== Singles: 1 (0–1) ===
Legend
Grand Slam Tournaments (0–0)
ATP World Tour Finals (0–0)
ATP World Tour Masters 1000 (0–0)
ATP World Tour 500 Series (0–0)
ATP World Tour 250 Series (0–1)

| Result | W–L | Date | Tournament | Surface | Opponent | Score |
|---|---|---|---|---|---|---|
| Loss | 0–1 | Aug 2009 | Los Angeles, US | Hard | (United States) Sam Querrey | 4–6, 6–3, 1–6 |

=== Doubles: 1 (1–0) ===
Legend
Grand Slam Tournaments (0–0)
ATP World Tour Finals (0–0)
ATP World Tour Masters 1000 (0–0)
ATP World Tour 500 Series (0–0)
ATP World Tour 250 Series (0–1)

| Result | W–L | Date | Tournament | Surface | Partner | Opponents | Score |
|---|---|---|---|---|---|---|---|
| Win | 1–0 | Jul 2010 | Newport, Rhode Island, U.S. | Grass | (Australia) Chris Guccione | (Mexico) Santiago González (United States) Travis Rettenmaier | 6–3, 6–4 |

== Performance timelines ==
Key
| W | F | SF | QF | #R | RR | Q# | DNQ | A | NH |

(W) winner; (F) finalist; (SF) semifinalist; (QF) quarterfinalist; (#R) rounds 4, 3, 2, 1; (RR) round-robin stage; (Q#) qualification round; (DNQ) did not qualify; (A) absent; (NH) not held; (SR) strike rate (events won / competed); (W–L) win–loss record.

=== Singles ===
Current as far as the 2012 US Open (tennis).

| Tournament | 2008 | 2009 | 2010 | 2011 | 2012 | W–L |
|---|---|---|---|---|---|---|
Grand Slam tournaments
| Australian Open | Q2 | 1R | 1R | 1R | Q3 | 0–3 |
| French Open | A | A | 2R | Q1 | A | 1–1 |
| Wimbledon | A | A | 1R | Q1 | A | 0–1 |
| US Open | 1R | 2R | 2R | Q2 | A | 2–3 |
| Win–loss | 0–1 | 1–2 | 2–4 | 0–1 | 0–0 | 3–8 |

=== Doubles ===
Current as far as the 2012 US Open (tennis).

| Tournament | 2006 | 2007 | 2008 | 2009 | 2010 | 2011 | 2012 | W–L |
|---|---|---|---|---|---|---|---|---|
Grand Slam tournaments
| Australian Open | 2R | 2R | 3R | 3R | 2R | 3R | 2R | 10–7 |
| French Open | A | A | A | A | 1R | A | 1R | 0–2 |
| Wimbledon | A | A | A | A | 3R | 3R | A | 4–2 |
| US Open | A | A | A | QF | 1R | A | A | 3–2 |
| Win–loss | 1–1 | 1–1 | 2–1 | 5–2 | 3–4 | 4–2 | 1–2 | 17–13 |
