= 2016 KPN Bangkok Open =

- Date: 4–10 January
- Edition: 8th
- Surface: Hard
- Location: Bangkok, Thailand

Champions

Singles
- (Russia) Mikhail Youzhny

Doubles
- (Sweden) Johan Brunström / (Sweden) Andreas Siljeström
- KPN Bangkok Open

The 2016 KPN Bangkok Open was a professional tennis tournament played on hard courts. It was the eighth edition of the tournament which was part of the 2016 ATP Challenger Tour. It took place in Bangkok, Thailand between 4 and 10 January 2016.

== Singles main-draw entrants ==
=== Seeds ===
Country	Player	Rank^{1}	Seed
JPN	Tatsuma Ito	119	1
JPN	Yūichi Sugita	126	2
RUS	Mikhail Youzhny	127	3
BEL	Kimmer Coppejans	130	4
JPN	Go Soeda	132	5
POR	Gastão Elias	133	6
RUS	Konstantin Kravchuk	139	7
BRA	André Ghem	149	8

- ^{1} Rankings are as of December 28, 2015.

=== Other entrants ===
The following players received wildcards into the singles main draw:

- (Thailand) Nattan Benjasupawan
- (Thailand) Phassawit Burapharitta
- (Thailand) Jirat Navasirisomboon
- (Thailand) Kittipong Wachiramanowong

The following player received entry to the main draw as a protected ranking:

- (Switzerland) Marco Chiudinelli

The following players received entry from the qualifying draw:

- (Belarus) Ilya Ivashka
- (Chinese Taipei) Jason Jung
- (Austria) Maximilian Neuchrist
- (Kazakhstan) Dmitry Popko

== Champions ==
=== Singles ===
- (Russia) Mikhail Youzhny def. (Japan) Go Soeda 6–3, 6–4

=== Doubles ===
- (Sweden) Johan Brunström / (Sweden) Andreas Siljeström def. (Germany) Gero Kretschmer / (Germany) Alexander Satschko 6–3, 6–4
