= Nuttanon Kadchapanan =

Thai tennis player (born 1993)

- Country (sports): Thailand
- Born: 7 June 1993 (age 33) Yala, Thailand
- Plays: Right-handed
- Prize money: $8,294

Singles
- Career record: 1–0
- Career titles: 0
- Highest ranking: No. 1213 (30 September 2013)

Doubles
- Career record: 4–3
- Career titles: 1
- Highest ranking: No. 392 (28 July 2014)
- Current ranking: No. 422
- Last updated on: 31 August 2014.

Nuttanon Kadchapanan (Thai: ณัฐนนท์ กัจฉปานันท์, born 7 June 1993) is a tennis player from Thailand playing on the ATP Challenger Tour. On 30 September 2013, he reached his highest ATP singles ranking of 1213 and his highest doubles ranking of 392 achieved on 28 July 2014.

== Tour titles ==
Legend
Grand Slam (0)
ATP Masters Series (0)
ATP Tour (0)
Challengers (1)

=== Doubles ===
Outcome	No.	Date	Tournament	Surface	Partner	Opponents	Score
Winner	1.	31 August 2014	Bangkok	Hard	(Thailand) Pruchya Isaro	(Chinese Taipei) Chen Ti (Chinese Taipei) Peng Hsien-yin	6–4, 6–4
