= Nicolas Meister (tennis) =

American tennis player

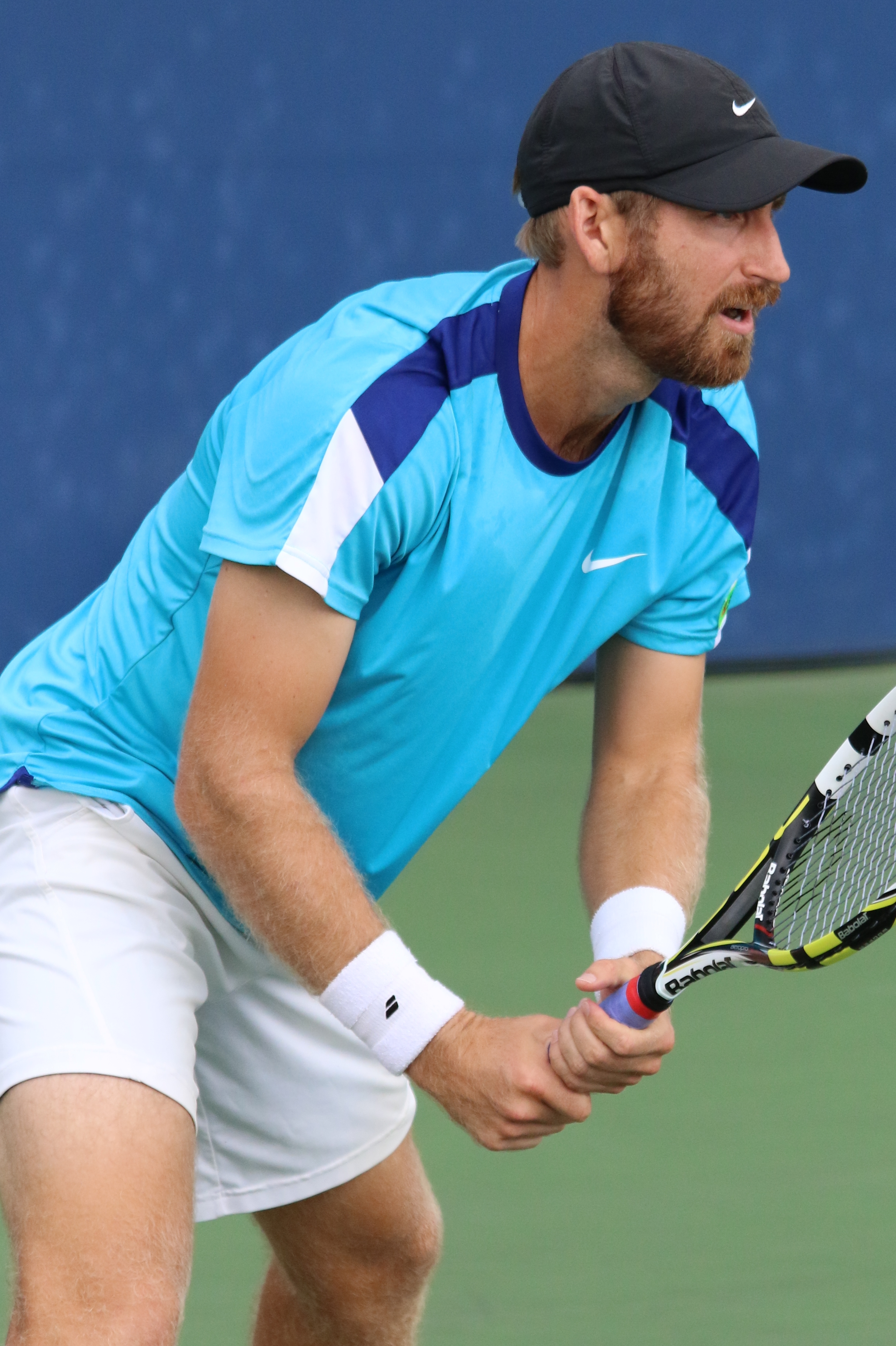
- Meister at the 2016 US Open
- Full name: Nicolas Christian Meister
- Country (sports): United States
- Residence: Los Angeles, United States
- Born: May 15, 1989 (age 36) Santa Ana, California, United States
- Height: 1.78 m (5 ft 10 in)
- Plays: Right-handed (two–handed backhand)
- Prize money: $131,491

Singles
- Career record: 0–1 (at ATP Tour level, Grand Slam level, and in Davis Cup)
- Career titles: 0
- Highest ranking: No. 263 (13 June 2016)

Doubles
- Career record: 0–2 (at ATP Tour level, Grand Slam level, and in Davis Cup)
- Career titles: 0
- Highest ranking: No. 180 (26 September 2016)

Grand Slam doubles results
- US Open: 1R (2016)

Nicolas Christian Meister (born May 15, 1989) is an American tennis player.

Meister has a career high ATP singles ranking of No. 263 achieved on 13 June 2016 and a career high ATP doubles ranking of No. 180 achieved on 26 September 2016.

Meister made his ATP main draw debut at the 2012 Farmers Classic where he qualified for the main draw, defeating Ilija Bozoljac, Rik de Voest and Jimmy Wang in the qualifying rounds. In the main draw he lost in the first round to the fifth seed Xavier Malisse, 4–6, 1–6. He was also given a wildcard into the doubles event partnering Marcos Giron, where they lost in the first round to Rajeev Ram and Michael Russell in straight sets.

Four years later, Meister made his Grand Slam debut when he received a wildcard entry into the 2016 US Open Men's Doubles tournament alongside countryman Eric Quigley. They were defeated in the first round by eventual quarter-finalists Łukasz Kubot and Alexander Peya.

Meister has graduated from UCLA Bruins.
