= 2011 Caloundra International – Singles =

Singles
- 2011 Caloundra International

Final
- Champion: (Slovenia) Grega Žemlja
- Runner-up: (Australia) Bernard Tomic
- Score: 7–6(4), 6–3

Events
| Singles | Doubles |
| ← 2010 · | Caloundra International | · 2012 → |

Grega Žemlja claimed the singles title. He won against Bernard Tomic 7–6(4), 6–3 in the final.

== Seeds ==
1. (Australia) Marinko Matosevic (quarterfinals)
2. (Czech Republic) Lukáš Rosol (first round)
3. (Italy) Paolo Lorenzi (second round)
4. (Australia) Carsten Ball (quarterfinals)
5. (Slovenia) Grega Žemlja (champion)
6. (Czech Republic) Jan Hernych (first round)
7. (Australia) Bernard Tomic (final)
8. (Australia) Matthew Ebden (semifinals)

== Draw ==
=== Key ===
- Q = Qualifier
- WC = Wild card
- LL = Lucky loser
- Alt = Alternate
- SE = Special exempt
- PR = Protected ranking
- ITF = ITF entry
- JE = Junior exempt
- w/o = Walkover
- r = Retired
- d = Defaulted
- SR = Special ranking

=== Finals ===
Semifinals
PR | (Thailand) Danai Udomchoke | 1 | 6 | 6^{6}
5 | (Slovenia) Grega Žemlja | 6 | 0 | 7
7 | (Australia) Bernard Tomic | 6 | 6
8 | (Australia) Matthew Ebden | 4 | 4

Final
5 | (Slovenia) Grega Žemlja | 7 | 6
7 | (Australia) Bernard Tomic | 6^{4} | 3

=== Top half ===
First round
1 | (Australia) M Matosevic | 6 | 2 | 6
Q | (China) D Wu | 0 | 6 | 4
(Australia) B Klein | 6 | 7
(Sweden) N Lindahl | 3 | 5
(Slovakia) P Červenák | 6 | 6^{2} | 2
PR | (Thailand) D Udomchoke | 4 | 7 | 6
(Australia) G Jones | 2 | 6 | 7
6 | (Czech Republic) J Hernych | 6 | 4 | 5
4 | (Australia) C Ball | 7 | 6
Q | (South Korea) D Yoo | 6^{3} | 2
WC | (Australia) J Lemke | 5
(United States) M Yani | 1 | r
(United Kingdom) J Ward | 6 | 1 | 6^{5}
(Canada) P Bester | 4 | 6 | 7
WC | (Australia) J Duckworth | 4 | 5
5 | (Slovenia) G Žemlja | 6 | 7

Second round
1 | (Australia) M Matosevic | 7 | 6
(Australia) B Klein | 5 | 2
PR | (Thailand) D Udomchoke | 6 | 6
(Australia) G Jones | 4 | 4
4 | (Australia) C Ball | 6 | 6
WC | (Australia) J Lemke | 3 | 4
(Canada) P Bester | 6^{4} | 6^{4}
5 | (Slovenia) G Žemlja | 7 | 7

Quarterfinals
1 | (Australia) M Matosevic | 6^{1} | 6 | 3
PR | (Thailand) D Udomchoke | 7 | 2 | 6
4 | (Australia) C Ball | 3 | 4
5 | (Slovenia) G Žemlja | 6 | 6

Semifinals
PR | (Thailand) D Udomchoke | 1 | 6 | 6^{6}
5 | (Slovenia) G Žemlja | 6 | 0 | 7

=== Bottom half ===
First round
7 | (Australia) B Tomic | 7 | 2 | 6
(Canada) P Polansky | 6^{3} | 6 | 3
(Australia) J Millman | 6 | 2 | 7
(Australia) S Groth | 2 | 6 | 5
(Czech Republic) D Lojda | 3 | 4
(Slovakia) I Klec | 6 | 6
WC | (Australia) B Mitchell | 6 | 3 | 2
3 | (Italy) P Lorenzi | 3 | 6 | 6
8 | (Australia) M Ebden | 6 | 6
(Japan) H Kondo | 2 | 1
LL | (China) M Gong | 2 | 4
Q | (Chinese Taipei) T-h Yang | 6 | 6
Q | (Australia) Dayne Kelly | 7 | 7
WC | (Australia) Matthew Barton | 5 | 6^{4}
(Italy) F Cipolla | 6 | 3 | 6
2 | (Czech Republic) L Rosol | 3 | 6 | 2

Second round
7 | (Australia) B Tomic | 1 | 6 | 7
(Australia) J Millman | 6 | 1 | 6^{6}
(Slovakia) I Klec | 7 | 6
3 | (Italy) P Lorenzi | 5 | 3
8 | (Australia) M Ebden | 6 | 3 | 6
Q | (Chinese Taipei) T-h Yang | 0 | 6 | 1
Q | (Australia) Dayne Kelly | 4 | 4
(Italy) F Cipolla | 6 | 6

Quarterfinals
7 | (Australia) B Tomic | 7 | 2 | 6
(Slovakia) I Klec | 5 | 6 | 1
8 | (Australia) M Ebden | 6 | 6
(Italy) F Cipolla | 1 | 2

Semifinals
7 | (Australia) B Tomic | 6 | 6
8 | (Australia) M Ebden | 4 | 4
