= 2012 Caloundra International – Doubles =

Doubles
- 2012 Caloundra International

Final
- Champions: (Australia) John Peers (Australia) John-Patrick Smith
- Runners-up: (United States) John Paul Fruttero (South Africa) Raven Klaasen
- Score: 7–6^{(7–5)}, 6–4

Events
Singles	Doubles
← 2011 ·	Caloundra International	· 2013 →

Matthew Ebden and Samuel Groth were the defending champions but Ebden decided not to participate.
Groth partners up with Adam Feeney, but lost in the first round to John Peers and John-Patrick Smith.
Peers and Smith then went on to win the title, defeating John Paul Fruttero and Raven Klaasen in the final, 7–6^{(7–5)}, 6–4.

== Seeds ==
1. (United States) John Paul Fruttero / (South Africa) Raven Klaasen (final)
2. (Chinese Taipei) Hsieh Cheng-peng / (Chinese Taipei) Lee Hsin-han (quarterfinals)
3. (India) Divij Sharan / (India) Vishnu Vardhan (quarterfinals)
4. (Australia) Colin Ebelthite / (Australia) Marinko Matosevic (quarterfinals)

== Draw ==
=== Key ===
- Q = Qualifier
- WC = Wild card
- LL = Lucky loser
- Alt = Alternate
- SE = Special exempt
- PR = Protected ranking
- ITF = ITF entry
- JE = Junior exempt
- w/o = Walkover
- r = Retired
- d = Defaulted
- SR = Special ranking

=== Draw ===
First round
1	(United States) JP Fruttero (South Africa) R Klaasen	7^{7}	6
(Slovakia) K Čapkovič (South Korea) W-s Jun	6^{2}	4
Alt	(Germany) G Kretschmer (Australia) N Lindahl	3	4
(Canada) É Chvojka (Australia) A Hubble	6	6
4	(Australia) C Ebelthite (Australia) M Matosevic	w/o
(Australia) B Mitchell (Australia) M Reid
(Germany) S Rieschick (Chinese Taipei) J Wang	3	6	[10]
WC	(Australia) L Saville (Australia) A Whittington	6	3	[1]
(United Kingdom) J Milton (Germany) A Satschko	5	0
o	(Australia) J Lemke (Australia) D Propoggia	7	6
WC	(Australia) M Barton (Australia) Michael Look	2	2
3	(India) D Sharan (India) V Vardhan	6	6
(Australia) J Peers (Australia) J-P Smith	6	7
(Australia) A Feeney (Australia) S Groth	3	5
(Australia) B Klein (Australia) Nima Roshan	4	6	[8]
2	(Chinese Taipei) C-p Hsieh (Chinese Taipei) H-h Lee	6	4	[10]

Quarterfinals
1	(United States) JP Fruttero (South Africa) R Klaasen	3	6	[10]
(Canada) É Chvojka (Australia) A Hubble	6	2	[6]
4	(Australia) C Ebelthite (Australia) M Matosevic	1	0
(Germany) S Rieschick (Chinese Taipei) J Wang	6	6
(Australia) J Lemke (Australia) D Propoggia	6	6
3	(India) D Sharan (India) V Vardhan	3	2
(Australia) J Peers (Australia) J-P Smith	6	6
2	(Chinese Taipei) C-p Hsieh (Chinese Taipei) H-h Lee	2	3

Semifinals
1	(United States) JP Fruttero (South Africa) R Klaasen	6	6
(Germany) S Rieschick (Chinese Taipei) J Wang	3	2
(Australia) J Lemke (Australia) D Propoggia	3	2
(Australia) J Peers (Australia) J-P Smith	6	6

Final
1	(United States) JP Fruttero (South Africa) R Klaasen	6^{5}	4
(Australia) J Peers (Australia) J-P Smith	7^{7}	6
