= 2011 Caloundra International – Doubles =

Doubles
- 2011 Caloundra International

Final
- Champions: (Australia) Matthew Ebden; (Australia) Samuel Groth
- Runners-up: (Slovakia) Pavol Červenák; (Slovakia) Ivo Klec
- Score: 6–3, 3–6, [10–1]

Events
Singles	Doubles
← 2010 ·	Caloundra International	· 2012 →

Matthew Ebden and Samuel Groth won this tournament. They defeated Pavol Červenák and Ivo Klec 6–3, 3–6, [10–1] in the final.

== Seeds ==
1. (Australia) Colin Ebelthite / (Australia) Adam Feeney (first round)
2. (Italy) Flavio Cipolla / (Czech Republic) Lukáš Rosol (semifinals)
3. (Australia) Matthew Ebden / (Australia) Samuel Groth (champions)
4. (Australia) Sadik Kadir / (Chinese Taipei) Yang Tsung-hua (semifinals)

== Draw ==
=== Key ===
- Q = Qualifier
- WC = Wild card
- LL = Lucky loser
- Alt = Alternate
- SE = Special exempt
- PR = Protected ranking
- ITF = ITF entry
- JE = Junior exempt
- w/o = Walkover
- r = Retired
- d = Defaulted
- SR = Special ranking

=== Draw ===
First round

Quarterfinals

Semifinals

Final

1
- (Australia) C Ebelthite
- (Australia) A Feeney
4
4

- (Slovakia) P Červenák
- (Slovakia) I Klec
6
6

- (Slovakia) P Červenák
- (Slovakia) I Klec
6
7

- (Italy) P Lorenzi
- (Slovenia) G Žemlja
1
4

WC
(Australia) Matthew Barton
(Australia) Michael Look
4
6^{5}

WC
(Australia) Matthew Barton
(Australia) Michael Look
6
6

- (Slovakia) P Červenák
- (Slovakia) I Klec
6
2
[10]

4
- (Australia) S Kadir
- (Chinese Taipei) T-h Yang
6
7

4
- (Australia) S Kadir
- (Chinese Taipei) T-h Yang
4
6
[6]

- (Australia) Nima Roshan
- (Australia) J Sirianni
4
5

4
- (Australia) S Kadir
- (Chinese Taipei) T-h Yang
6
5
[10]

WC
(Australia) G Jones
(Australia) Joel Lindner
5
6
[7]

- (Australia) M Matosevic
- (New Zealand) J Statham
2
7
[7]

- (Australia) M Matosevic
- (New Zealand) J Statham
7
3
[10]

- (Slovakia) P Červenák
- (Slovakia) I Klec
3
6
[1]

- (Japan) H Kondo
- (Thailand) D Udomchoke
6
6^{7}
[10]

3
- (Australia) M Ebden
- (Australia) S Groth
6
3
[10]

- (Canada) P Bester
- (Canada) P Polansky
3
7
[5]

- (Japan) H Kondo
- (Thailand) D Udomchoke
3
2

- (China) M Gong
- (China) D Wu
6
4
[5]

3
- (Australia) M Ebden
- (Australia) S Groth
6
6

3
- (Australia) M Ebden
- (Australia) S Groth
3
6
[10]

3
- (Australia) M Ebden
- (Australia) S Groth
6
6

- (Australia) C Ball
- (Sweden) N Lindahl

2
- (Italy) F Cipolla
- (Czech Republic) L Rosol
3
4

WC
- (Australia) J Duckworth
- (Australia) J Lemke
w/o

WC
- (Australia) J Duckworth
- (Australia) J Lemke
4
5

- (Australia) B Klein
- (Australia) J Millman
4
5

2
- (Italy) F Cipolla
- (Czech Republic) L Rosol
6
7

2
- (Italy) F Cipolla
- (Czech Republic) L Rosol
6
7
