= 2013 Delray Beach International Tennis Championships – Doubles =

Doubles
- 2013 Delray Beach International Tennis Championships

Final
- Champions: (United States) James Blake (United States) Jack Sock
- Runners-up: (Belarus) Max Mirnyi (Romania) Horia Tecău
- Score: 6–4, 6–4

Events
Singles	Doubles
← 2012 ·	Delray Beach Open	· 2014 →

Colin Fleming and Ross Hutchins were the defending champions, but Hutchins did not participate this year because of illness. Fleming played alongside John Peers, but the team lost to James Blake and Jack Sock in the first round.
Blake and Sock went on to win the title, defeating Max Mirnyi and Horia Tecău in the final, 6–4, 6–4.

== Seeds ==
1. (Belarus) Max Mirnyi / (Romania) Horia Tecău (final)
2. (Croatia) Ivan Dodig / (Brazil) Marcelo Melo (first round)
3. (United Kingdom) Colin Fleming / (Australia) John Peers (first round)
4. (Sweden) Johan Brunström / (South Africa) Raven Klaasen (semifinals)

== Draw ==
=== Key ===
- Q = Qualifier
- WC = Wild card
- LL = Lucky loser
- Alt = Alternate
- SE = Special exempt
- PR = Protected ranking
- ITF = ITF entry
- JE = Junior exempt
- w/o = Walkover
- r = Retired
- d = Defaulted
- SR = Special ranking

=== Draw ===
First round
1	(Belarus) M Mirnyi (Romania) H Tecău	6	6
(Brazil) A Sá (Slovakia) I Zelenay	1	4
(Russia) M Elgin (Uzbekistan) D Istomin	5	3
(Belgium) X Malisse (Germany) F Moser	7	6
4	(Sweden) J Brunström (South Africa) R Klaasen	5	7	[10]
(Poland) T Bednarek (Australia) M Matosevic	7	5	[5]
(United States) J Cerretani (France) É Roger-Vasselin	4	5
PR	(Czech Republic) J Levinský (Chinese Taipei) Y-h Lu	6	7
Alt	(Lithuania) R Berankis (Russia) E Donskoy	6	6
(Colombia) A Falla (Japan) G Soeda	0	2
WC	(United States) J Blake (United States) J Sock	6	3	[10]
3	(United Kingdom) C Fleming (Australia) J Peers	2	6	[7]
(Germany) A Begemann (Germany) M Emmrich	6^{5}	6	[10]
WC	(Australia) M Ebden (United States) M Russell	7^{7}	0	[8]
(Germany) D Brown (Germany) C Kas	2	7	[10]
2	(Croatia) I Dodig (Brazil) M Melo	6	5	[5]

Quarterfinals
1	(Belarus) M Mirnyi (Romania) H Tecău	6	6
(Belgium) X Malisse (Germany) F Moser	0	4
4	(Sweden) J Brunström (South Africa) R Klaasen	7	6
PR	(Czech Republic) J Levinský (Chinese Taipei) Y-h Lu	5	1
Alt	(Lithuania) R Berankis (Russia) E Donskoy	2	1
WC	(United States) J Blake (United States) J Sock	6	6
(Germany) A Begemann (Germany) M Emmrich	4	6	[5]
(Germany) D Brown (Germany) C Kas	6	3	[10]

Semifinals
1	(Belarus) M Mirnyi (Romania) H Tecău	7^{7}	6
4	(Sweden) J Brunström (South Africa) R Klaasen	6^{4}	3
WC	(United States) J Blake (United States) J Sock	6	7
(Germany) D Brown (Germany) C Kas	2	5

Final
1	(Belarus) M Mirnyi (Romania) H Tecău	4	4
WC	(United States) J Blake (United States) J Sock	6	6
