= 2012 Delray Beach International Tennis Championships =

- Date: 27 February – 4 March
- Edition: 20th
- Category: World Tour 250 series
- Draw: 32S / 16D
- Prize money: $442,500
- Surface: Hard / outdoor
- Location: Delray Beach, United States

Champions

Singles
- (South Africa) Kevin Anderson

Doubles
- (United Kingdom) Colin Fleming / (United Kingdom) Ross Hutchins
← 2011 ·	Delray Beach Open	· 2013 →

The 2012 Delray Beach International Tennis Championships was a professional tennis tournament played on hard courts. It was the 20th edition of the tournament which was part of the World Tour 250 series of the 2012 ATP World Tour. It took place in Delray Beach, United States between 27 February and 4 March 2012. Seventh-seeded Kevin Anderson won the singles title.

== Finals ==
=== Singles ===
(South Africa) Kevin Anderson defeated (Australia) Marinko Matosevic, 6–4, 7–6^{(7–2)}

- It was Anderson's 1st title of the year and 2nd of his career.

=== Doubles ===
(United Kingdom) Colin Fleming / (United Kingdom) Ross Hutchins defeated (Slovakia) Michal Mertiňák / (Brazil) André Sá 2–6, 7–6^{(7–5)}, [15–13]

== Singles main-draw entrants ==
=== Seeds ===
Country	Player	Rank^{1}	Seed
USA	John Isner	13	1
CRO	Marin Čilić	21	2
SRB	Viktor Troicki	22	3
USA	Andy Roddick	27	4
GER	Philipp Kohlschreiber	30	5
RUS	Alex Bogomolov Jr.	33	6
RSA	Kevin Anderson	36	7
AUS	Bernard Tomic	37	8

- Rankings are as of February 20, 2012

=== Other entrants ===
The following players received wildcards into the singles main draw:

- (Germany) Tommy Haas
- (United States) Denis Kudla
- (United States) Jesse Levine

The following players received entry from the qualifying draw:

- (United States) Austin Krajicek
- (Australia) Marinko Matosevic
- (United States) Tim Smyczek
- (United States) Michael Yani

== Doubles main-draw entrants ==
=== Seeds ===
Country	Player	Country	Player	Rank^{1}	Seed
USA	Bob Bryan	USA	Mike Bryan	2	1
~~AUT~~	~~Jürgen Melzer~~	~~GER~~	~~Philipp Petzschner~~	~~30~~	~~2~~
GBR	Colin Fleming	GBR	Ross Hutchins	62	3
BAH	Mark Knowles	BEL	Xavier Malisse	87	4

- Rankings are as of February 20, 2012

=== Other entrants ===
The following pairs received wildcards into the doubles main draw:

- (United States) Jesse Levine / (United States) Bobby Reynolds
- (United States) Nicholas Monroe / (United States) Jack Sock

The following pairs entry as alternates:

- (Italy) Stefano Ianni / (United States) Denis Kudla
- (United Kingdom) James Ward / (United States) Michael Yani

=== Withdrawals ===
- (Russia) Alex Bogomolov Jr. (illness)
- (Austria) Jürgen Melzer (back injury)
