= 2015 U.S. Men's Clay Court Championships =

- Date: April 6–12
- Edition: 47th
- Category: World Tour 250
- Draw: 28S / 16D
- Prize money: $488,225
- Surface: Clay / outdoor
- Location: Houston, Texas, United States
- Venue: River Oaks Country Club

Champions

Singles
- (United States) Jack Sock

Doubles
- (Lithuania) Ričardas Berankis / (Russia) Teymuraz Gabashvili
- U.S. Men's Clay Court Championships

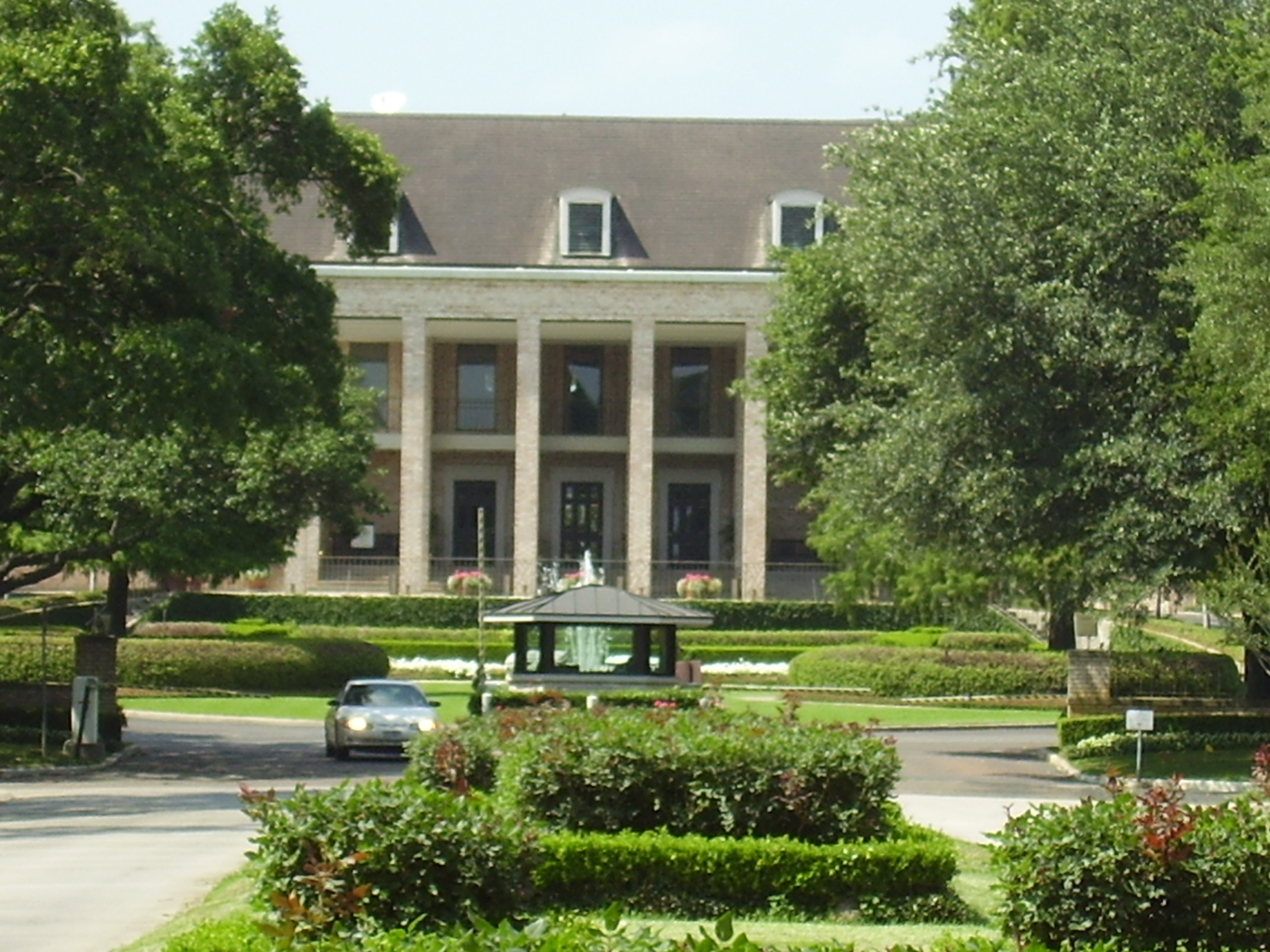
River Oaks Country Club

The 2015 U.S. Men's Clay Court Championships (also known as the Fayez Sarofim & Co. U.S. Men's Clay Court Championships for sponsorship purposes) was a tennis tournament played on outdoor clay courts. It was the 47th edition of the U.S. Men's Clay Court Championships, and an ATP World Tour 250 event on the 2015 ATP World Tour. It took place at River Oaks Country Club in Houston, Texas, United States, from April 6 through April 12, 2015. Unseeded Jack Sock won the singles title.

== Finals ==
=== Singles ===
- (United States) Jack Sock defeated (United States) Sam Querrey, 7–6^{(11–9)}, 7–6^{(7–2)}

=== Doubles ===
- (Lithuania) Ričardas Berankis / (Russia) Teymuraz Gabashvili defeated (Philippines) Treat Huey / (United States) Scott Lipsky, 6–4, 6–4

== Singles main-draw entrants ==
=== Seeds ===
Country	Player	Rank^{1}	Seed
ESP	Feliciano López	12	1
ESP	Roberto Bautista Agut	15	2
RSA	Kevin Anderson	17	3
USA	John Isner	24	4
COL	Santiago Giraldo	31	5
ESP	Fernando Verdasco	34	6
FRA	Jérémy Chardy	38	7
USA	Sam Querrey	42	8

- Rankings are as of March 23, 2015.

=== Other entrants ===
The following players received wildcards into the main draw:

- (Australia) Lleyton Hewitt
- (Spain) Feliciano López
- (Serbia) Janko Tipsarević

The following players received entry via the qualifying draw:

- (Argentina) Facundo Argüello
- (South Korea) Chung Hyeon
- (Brazil) Guilherme Clezar
- (Brazil) Rogério Dutra Silva

=== Withdrawals ===
Before the tournament

- (France) Gaël Monfils →replaced by Go Soeda
- (Australia) Bernard Tomic →replaced by Tim Smyczek

=== Retirements ===
- (Italy) Paolo Lorenzi
- (Australia) Marinko Matosevic (left foot injury)

== Doubles main-draw entrants ==
=== Seeds ===
Country	Player	Country	Player	Rank^{1}	Seed
USA	Bob Bryan	USA	Mike Bryan	2	1
USA	Eric Butorac	AUS	Sam Groth	64	2
SWE	Robert Lindstedt	AUT	Jürgen Melzer	72	3
POL	Mariusz Fyrstenberg	MEX	Santiago González	81	4

- Rankings are as of March 23, 2015.

=== Other entrants ===
The following pair received wildcards into the doubles main draw:

- (Australia) Lleyton Hewitt / (Australia) Matt Reid
- (Germany) Philipp Petzschner / (Serbia) Janko Tipsarević

The following pairs received entry as alternates:

- (Lithuania) Ričardas Berankis / (Russia) Teymuraz Gabashvili
- (India) Somdev Devvarman / (India) Sanam Singh

=== Withdrawals ===
Before the tournament

- (United States) Ryan Harrison (right hip injury)
- (Australia) Marinko Matosevic (left foot injury)

=== Retirements ===
- (Mexico) Santiago González (right hamstring injury)
