= 2011 Delray Beach International Tennis Championships – Singles =

Singles
- 2011 Delray Beach International Tennis Championships

Final
- Champion: (Argentina) Juan Martín del Potro
- Runner-up: (Serbia) Janko Tipsarević
- Score: 6–4, 6–4

Details
- Draw: 32
- Seeds: 8

Events
Singles	Doubles
- Delray Beach Open

Ernests Gulbis was the defending champion but decided to participate in the 2011 Dubai Tennis Championships instead.
Juan Martín del Potro won this tournament, by defeating Janko Tipsarević 6–4, 6–4 in the final.

== Seeds ==
1. (United States) Andy Roddick (withdrew due to flu)
2. (United States) Mardy Fish (semifinals)
3. (United States) Sam Querrey (second round)
4. (United States) John Isner (first round)
5. (South Africa) Kevin Anderson (quarterfinals)
6. (Serbia) Janko Tipsarević (final)
7. (Germany) Benjamin Becker (first round)
8. (France) Adrian Mannarino (second round)

== Draw ==
Key

- Q = Qualifier
- WC = Wild card
- LL = Lucky loser
- Alt = Alternate
- ITF = ITF entry
- PR = Protected ranking
- SR = Special ranking
- SE = Special exempt
- JE = Junior exempt
- JR = Junior Accelerator Programme entrant
- CO = College Accelerator Programme entrant
- NG = Next Gen Accelerator Program entrant
- w/o = Walkover
- r = Retired
- d = Defaulted

=== Finals ===
Semifinals
6	(Serbia) Janko Tipsarević	6	6
(Japan) Kei Nishikori	4	4
SE	(Argentina) Juan Martín del Potro	6	7
2	(United States) Mardy Fish	1	5

Final
6	(Serbia) Janko Tipsarević	4	4
SE	(Argentina) Juan Martín del Potro	6	6

=== Top half ===
First round
Q	(Australia) M Matosevic	6	1	2
(Israel) D Sela	3	6	6
LL	(Russia) I Kunitsyn	4	6	3
(Croatia) I Dodig	6	2	6
LL	(Colombia) R Farah	1	4
Q	(Slovenia) B Kavčič	6	6
(Croatia) I Karlović	6^{14}	6^{1}
6	(Serbia) J Tipsarević	7	7
3/WC	(United States) S Querrey	6	5	6
(Germany) D Brown	3	7	3
Q	(United States) R Sweeting	6	6
(Russia) I Andreev	2	3
(Argentina) B Dabul	2	6^{5}
(Japan) K Nishikori	6	7
WC	(United States) J Blake	7	6
7	(Germany) B Becker	5	4

Second round
(Israel) D Sela	6	3	2
(Croatia) I Dodig	2	6	6
Q	(Slovenia) B Kavčič	2	7	3
6	(Serbia) J Tipsarević	6	6^{8}	6
3/WC	(United States) S Querrey	6^{5}	4
Q	(United States) R Sweeting	7	6
(Japan) K Nishikori	6	6
WC	(United States) J Blake	3	4

Quarterfinals
(Croatia) I Dodig	6^{0}	1
6	(Serbia) J Tipsarević	7	6
Q	(United States) R Sweeting	7	2	4
(Japan) K Nishikori	6^{5}	6	6

Semifinals
6	(Serbia) J Tipsarević	6	6
(Japan) K Nishikori	4	4

=== Bottom half ===
First round
5	(South Africa) K Anderson	6^{5}	7	6
LL	(United States) D Young	7	6^{4}	2
(France) F Serra	3	6	7
WC	(United States) R Harrison	6	3	5
(Lithuania) R Berankis	4	1
SE	(Argentina) JM del Potro	6	6
(Russia) T Gabashvili	6	5	7
4	(United States) J Isner	4	7	6^{13}
8	(France) A Mannarino	1	7	6
(Argentina) L Mayer	6	6^{3}	4
Q	(Colombia) A Falla	6	2
LL	(Czech Republic) J Hájek	1	0	r
(Brazil) R Mello	2	6	6
(Germany) R Schüttler	6	2	3
(Germany) B Phau	0	r
2	(United States) M Fish	5

Second round
5	(South Africa) K Anderson	6	6
(France) F Serra	1	4
SE	(Argentina) JM del Potro	6	6
(Russia) T Gabashvili	1	1
8	(France) A Mannarino	3	2
Q	(Colombia) A Falla	6	6
(Brazil) R Mello	2	1
2	(United States) M Fish	6	6

Quarterfinals
5	(South Africa) K Anderson	4	4
SE	(Argentina) JM del Potro	6	6
Q	(Colombia) A Falla	1	4
2	(United States) M Fish	6	6

Semifinals
SE	(Argentina) JM del Potro	6	7
2	(United States) M Fish	1	5
