= 2011 Delray Beach International Tennis Championships =

- Date: 21–27 February
- Edition: 19th
- Category: World Tour 250 series
- Draw: 32S / 16D
- Prize money: $442,500
- Surface: Hard / outdoor
- Location: Delray Beach, Florida, U.S.
- Venue: Delray Beach Tennis Center

Champions

Singles
- (Argentina) Juan Martín del Potro

Doubles
- (United States) Scott Lipsky / (United States) Rajeev Ram
← 2010 ·	Delray Beach Open	· 2012 →

The 2011 Delray Beach International Tennis Championships was a professional tennis tournament played on hard courts. It was the 19th edition of the tournament which was part of the World Tour 250 series of the 2011 ATP World Tour. It took place in Delray Beach, United States between 21 and 27 February 2011. Unseeded Juan Martín del Potro, who entered on a Special Exempt, won the singles title.

== ATP entrants ==
=== Seeds ===
Country	Player	Rank^{1}	Seed
USA	Andy Roddick	8	1
USA	Mardy Fish	17	2
USA	Sam Querrey	18	3
USA	John Isner	24	4
RSA	Kevin Anderson	40	5
SRB	Janko Tipsarević	51	6
GER	Benjamin Becker	57	7
FRA	Adrian Mannarino	61	8

- Rankings are as of February 14, 2011.

=== Other entrants ===
The following players received wildcards into the singles main draw:

- (United States) James Blake
- (United States) Ryan Harrison
- (United States) Sam Querrey

The following entrant has been granted a Special Exemption into the main draw:

- (Argentina) Juan Martín del Potro

The following players received entry from the qualifying draw:

- (Colombia) Alejandro Falla
- (Slovenia) Blaž Kavčič
- (Australia) Marinko Matosevic
- (United States) Ryan Sweeting

The following players received entry as a lucky loser into the singles main draw:

- (Colombia) Robert Farah
- (Czech Republic) Jan Hájek
- (Russia) Igor Kunitsyn
- (United States) Donald Young

== Finals ==
=== Singles ===
(Argentina) Juan Martín del Potro defeated (Serbia) Janko Tipsarević, 6–4, 6–4

- It was del Potro's 1st title of the year and 8th of his career.

=== Doubles ===
(United States) Scott Lipsky / (United States) Rajeev Ram defeated (Germany) Christopher Kas / (Austria) Alexander Peya, 4–6, 6–4, [10–3]
