= 2016 Busan Open – Singles =

Singles
- 2016 Busan Open

Final
- Champion: (Russia) Konstantin Kravchuk
- Runner-up: (United Kingdom) Daniel Evans
- Score: 6–4, 6–4

Events
| Singles | Doubles |
| ← 2015 · | Busan Open | · 2017 → |

Konstantin Kravchuk won the singles title at the 2016 Busan Open tennis tournament after defeating Daniel Evans 6–4, 6–4 in the final.

Chung Hyeon was the defending champion but lost in the first round to Kravchuk.

== Seeds ==
1. (Lithuania) Ričardas Berankis (first round, retired)
2. (Australia) John Millman (semifinals)
3. (Australia) Sam Groth (first round)
4. (South Korea) Chung Hyeon (first round)
5. (Japan) Tatsuma Ito (first round)
6. (Slovakia) Lukáš Lacko (second round)
7. (Japan) Yūichi Sugita (quarterfinals)
8. (Germany) Michael Berrer (first round)

== Draw ==
=== Key ===
- Q = Qualifier
- WC = Wild card
- LL = Lucky loser
- Alt = Alternate
- SE = Special exempt
- PR = Protected ranking
- ITF = ITF entry
- JE = Junior exempt
- w/o = Walkover
- r = Retired
- d = Defaulted
- SR = Special ranking

=== Finals ===
Semifinals
(Slovenia) Grega Žemlja | 4 | 5
(Russia) Konstantin Kravchuk | 6 | 7
(United Kingdom) Daniel Evans | 6 | 6
2 | (Australia) John Millman | 3 | 3

Final
(Russia) Konstantin Kravchuk | 6 | 6
(United Kingdom) Daniel Evans | 4 | 4

=== Top half ===
First round
1 | (Lithuania) R Berankis | 2 | 0^{r}
(United States) A Sarkissian | 6 | 3
WC | (South Korea) Oh Chan-yeong | 3 | 2
(Switzerland) M Chiudinelli | 6 | 6
(Slovenia) G Žemlja | 7^{7} | 7^{7}
WC | (South Korea) S-w Kwon | 6^{4} | 6^{5}
WC | (South Korea) S-c Hong | 6 | 4 | 2
6 | (Slovakia) L Lacko | 4 | 6 | 6
4 | (South Korea) H Chung | 3 | 3
(Russia) K Kravchuk | 6 | 6
Q | (Australia) M Barton | 1 | 4
Q | (Chinese Taipei) J Wang | 6 | 6
(Australia) J-P Smith | 6 | 6
Q | (Poland) M Przysiężny | 3 | 1
Q | (Australia) M Matosevic | 6 | 6
5 | (Japan) T Ito | 3 | 3

Second round
(United States) A Sarkissian | 6 | 3 | 3
(Switzerland) M Chiudinelli | 4 | 6 | 6
(Slovenia) G Žemlja | 0 | 7 | 6
6 | (Slovakia) L Lacko | 6 | 5 | 3
(Russia) K Kravchuk | 6 | 7
Q | (Chinese Taipei) J Wang | 4 | 5
(Australia) J-P Smith | 6 | 3 | 3
Q | (Australia) M Matosevic | 3 | 6 | 6

Quarterfinals
(Switzerland) M Chiudinelli | 4 | 6 | 3
(Slovenia) G Žemlja | 6 | 3 | 6
(Russia) K Kravchuk | 6^{4} | 7 | 0
Q | (Australia) M Matosevic | 7^{7} | 5 | 0^{r}

Semifinals
(Slovenia) G Žemlja | 4 | 5
(Russia) K Kravchuk | 6 | 7

=== Bottom half ===
First round
7 | (Japan) Y Sugita | 3 | 7 | 6
(China) D Wu | 6 | 5 | 4
(South Korea) D-h Lee | 3 | 6 | 7^{7}
(Japan) G Soeda | 6 | 4 | 6^{5}
(United Kingdom) D Evans | 6 | 6
(Russia) A Kudryavtsev | 3 | 1
WC | (South Korea) J-s Nam | 6^{3} | 7^{7} | 7
3 | (Australia) S Groth | 7^{7} | 6^{4} | 5
8 | (Germany) M Berrer | 1 | 6 | 3
SE | (United Kingdom) L Broady | 6 | 4 | 6
Alt | (United States) D Nguyen | 6 | 6
(Chinese Taipei) T Chen | 3 | 4
(Ukraine) S Stakhovsky | 4 | 6 | 6
(China) Z Zhang | 6 | 2 | 3
(United States) A Krajicek | 1 | 0^{r}
2 | (Australia) J Millman | 6 | 0

Second round
7 | (Japan) Y Sugita | 4 | 7^{12} | 6
(South Korea) D-h Lee | 6 | 6^{10} | 0
(United Kingdom) D Evans | 6 | 6
WC | (South Korea) J-s Nam | 3 | 2
SE | (United Kingdom) L Broady | 6 | 7
Alt | (United States) D Nguyen | 3 | 5
(Ukraine) S Stakhovsky | 6 | 4 | 2
2 | (Australia) J Millman | 2 | 6 | 6

Quarterfinals
7 | (Japan) Y Sugita | 2 | 3
(United Kingdom) D Evans | 6 | 6
SE | (United Kingdom) L Broady | 0 | 0
2 | (Australia) J Millman | 6 | 6

Semifinals
(United Kingdom) D Evans | 6 | 6
2 | (Australia) J Millman | 3 | 3
