= 2013 Delray Beach International Tennis Championships – Singles =

Singles
- 2013 Delray Beach International Tennis Championships

Final
- Champion: (Latvia) Ernests Gulbis
- Runner-up: (France) Édouard Roger-Vasselin
- Score: 7–6^{(7–3)}, 6–3

Details
- Draw: 32
- Seeds: 8

Events
Singles	Doubles
- Delray Beach Open

Kevin Anderson was the defending champion, but lost to John Isner in the quarterfinals.

Ernests Gulbis won the title, defeating Édouard Roger-Vasselin 7–6^{(7–3)}, 6–3 in the final.

== Seeds ==
1. (United States) John Isner (semifinals)
2. (Germany) Tommy Haas (semifinals)
3. (United States) Sam Querrey (second round)
4. (Japan) Kei Nishikori (first round, retired)
5. (Ukraine) Alexandr Dolgopolov (first round)
6. (South Africa) Kevin Anderson (quarterfinals)
7. (Spain) Feliciano López (withdrew because of an arm injury)
8. (Belgium) Xavier Malisse (second round)

== Draw ==
Key

- Q = Qualifier
- WC = Wild card
- LL = Lucky loser
- Alt = Alternate
- ITF = ITF entry
- PR = Protected ranking
- SR = Special ranking
- SE = Special exempt
- JE = Junior exempt
- JR = Junior Accelerator Programme entrant
- CO = College Accelerator Programme entrant
- NG = Next Gen Accelerator Program entrant
- w/o = Walkover
- r = Retired
- d = Defaulted

=== Finals ===
Semifinals
1	(United States) John Isner	4	6	4
(France) Édouard Roger-Vasselin	6	4	6
Q	(Latvia) Ernests Gulbis	6	4	7^{7}
2	(Germany) Tommy Haas	3	6	6^{2}

Final
(France) Édouard Roger-Vasselin	6^{3}	3
Q	(Latvia) Ernests Gulbis	7^{7}	6

=== Top half ===
First round
1	(United States) J Isner	7^{7}	5	6
(Canada) J Levine	6^{3}	7	4
(Australia) M Matosevic	6	4	6^{6}
(Japan) G Soeda	2	6	7^{8}
Q	(United States) B Reynolds	3	5
(Chinese Taipei) Y-h Lu	6	7
Q	(United States) T Smyczek	3	4
6	(South Africa) K Anderson	6	6
4	(Japan) K Nishikori	4^{r}
(Croatia) I Karlović	5
(Italy) F Cipolla	1	4
(France) É Roger-Vasselin	6	6
(Australia) M Ebden	3	3
WC	(United States) J Sock	6	6
(Germany) B Phau	1	6^{4}
LL	(Lithuania) R Berankis	6	7^{7}

Second round
1	(United States) J Isner	7^{7}	6
(Japan) G Soeda	6^{2}	2
(Chinese Taipei) Y-h Lu	4	6	3
6	(South Africa) K Anderson	6	3	6
(Croatia) I Karlović	4	5
(France) É Roger-Vasselin	6	7
WC	(United States) J Sock	6	4	1
LL	(Lithuania) R Berankis	3	6	6

Quarterfinals
1	(United States) J Isner	6	7^{7}
6	(South Africa) K Anderson	2	6^{1}
(France) É Roger-Vasselin	6	6
LL	(Lithuania) R Berankis	4	3

Semifinals
1	(United States) J Isner	4	6	4
(France) É Roger-Vasselin	6	4	6

=== Bottom half ===
First round
8	(Belgium) X Malisse	6	6
(Colombia) A Falla	3	3
(United States) R Harrison	2	6	3
Q	(Spain) D Muñoz de la Nava	6	1	6
Q	(Latvia) E Gulbis	6	6
WC	(United States) J Blake	1	4
(United States) M Russell	2	2^{r}
3/WC	(United States) S Querrey	6	2
5	(Ukraine) A Dolgopolov	3	3
(Croatia) I Dodig	6	6
(Russia) E Donskoy	7^{7}	6
(Belgium) S Darcis	6^{5}	3
(Uzbekistan) D Istomin	6^{3}	6	7
(Germany) B Becker	7^{7}	4	5
(Netherlands) I Sijsling	7	4	0^{r}
2	(Germany) T Haas	5	6	0

Second round
8	(Belgium) X Malisse	6^{3}	6	3
Q	(Spain) D Muñoz de la Nava	7^{7}	3	6
Q	(Latvia) E Gulbis	6	4	7^{7}
3/WC	(United States) S Querrey	4	6	6^{4}
(Croatia) I Dodig	6	7
(Russia) E Donskoy	3	5
(Uzbekistan) D Istomin	4	1
2	(Germany) T Haas	6	6

Quarterfinals
Q	(Spain) D Muñoz de la Nava	1	4
Q	(Latvia) E Gulbis	6	6
(Croatia) I Dodig	6^{6}	6	1
2	(Germany) T Haas	7^{8}	2	6

Semifinals
Q	(Latvia) E Gulbis	6	4	7^{7}
2	(Germany) T Haas	3	6	6^{2}

== Qualifying ==
=== Seeds ===
1. (Lithuania) Ričardas Berankis (qualifying competition, lucky loser)
2. (United States) Tim Smyczek (qualified)
3. (Latvia) Ernests Gulbis (qualified)
4. (Belgium) Ruben Bemelmans (first round, retired because of a lower back injury)
5. (Canada) Vasek Pospisil (first round)
6. (Portugal) Gastão Elias (qualifying competition)
7. (Canada) Frank Dancevic (second round)
8. (Brazil) Thiago Alves (first round)

=== Qualifiers ===
1. (United States) Bobby Reynolds
2. (United States) Tim Smyczek
3. (Latvia) Ernests Gulbis
4. (Spain) Daniel Muñoz de la Nava

=== Lucky losers ===
1. (Lithuania) Ričardas Berankis

=== Draw ===
==== First qualifier ====
First round
1	(Lithuania) Ričardas Berankis	6	6
WC	(United States) Sekou Bangoura	4	2
WC	(Argentina) Juan Rocha	1	3
(United States) Denis Zivkovic	6	6
(Germany) Mischa Zverev	6	4	0^{r}
(United States) Bobby Reynolds	2	6	1
(Czech Republic) Marek Michalička	4	3
7	(Canada) Frank Dancevic	6	6

Second round
1	(Lithuania) Ričardas Berankis	2	6	6
(United States) Denis Zivkovic	6	2	1
(United States) Bobby Reynolds	6	7
7	(Canada) Frank Dancevic	3	5

Qualifying competition
1	(Lithuania) Ričardas Berankis	6^{9}	6^{3}
(United States) Bobby Reynolds	7^{11}	7^{7}

==== Second qualifier ====
First round
2	(United States) Tim Smyczek	6	7
(United States) Robby Ginepri	2	5
(Canada) Érik Chvojka	1	3
(United States) Bradley Klahn	6	6
PR	(Brazil) Caio Zampieri	4	1
(United States) Denis Kudla	6	6
(United States) Chase Buchanan	7	7
5	(Canada) Vasek Pospisil	5	5

Second round
2	(United States) Tim Smyczek	7^{7}	6
(United States) Bradley Klahn	6^{4}	3
(United States) Denis Kudla	6	6
(United States) Chase Buchanan	2	1

Qualifying competition
2	(United States) Tim Smyczek	6	4	6
(United States) Denis Kudla	4	6	4

==== Third qualifier ====
First round
3	(Latvia) Ernests Gulbis	6	6
(United States) Daniel Kosakowski	3	4
(United States) Alex Kuznetsov	2	3
(Ukraine) Illya Marchenko	6	6
WC	(United States) Jared Hiltzik	3	4
(Kazakhstan) Andrey Golubev	6	6
(Ukraine) Denys Molchanov	6^{1}	6	7
8	(Brazil) Thiago Alves	7^{7}	4	5

Second round
3	(Latvia) Ernests Gulbis	7^{7}	6
(Ukraine) Illya Marchenko	6^{2}	4
(Kazakhstan) Andrey Golubev	4	5
(Ukraine) Denys Molchanov	6	7

Qualifying competition
3	(Latvia) Ernests Gulbis	6^{4}	7	6
(Ukraine) Denys Molchanov	7^{7}	5	4

==== Fourth qualifier ====
First round
4	(Belgium) Ruben Bemelmans	0	0^{r}
(Spain) Daniel Muñoz de la Nava	6	0
(United States) Donald Young	7^{7}	6^{2}	6
(Russia) Alex Bogomolov Jr.	6^{5}	7^{7}	3
(Germany) Dustin Brown	4	2
(United States) Ryan Sweeting	6	6
WC	(United States) Michael McClune	3	6^{7}
6	(Portugal) Gastão Elias	6	7^{9}

Second round
(Spain) Daniel Muñoz de la Nava	7^{7}	6
(United States) Donald Young	6^{5}	3
(United States) Ryan Sweeting	3	6	4
6	(Portugal) Gastão Elias	6	3	6

Qualifying competition
(Spain) Daniel Muñoz de la Nava	6	6
6	(Portugal) Gastão Elias	2	4
