= 2012 Caloundra International =

- Date: 6–12 February
- Edition: 6th
- Location: Caloundra, Australia

Champions

Singles
- (Australia) Marinko Matosevic

Doubles
- (Australia) John Peers / (Australia) John-Patrick Smith
← 2011 ·	Caloundra International	· 2013 →

The 2012 Caloundra International was a professional tennis tournament played on hard courts. It was the sixth edition of the tournament which was part of the 2012 ATP Challenger Tour. It took place in Caloundra, Australia between 6 and 12 February 2012.

== ATP entrants ==
=== Seeds ===
Country	Player	Rank^{1}	Seed
TPE	Lu Yen-hsun	65	1
AUS	Marinko Matosevic	200	2
AUS	James Duckworth	205	3
AUS	Greg Jones	216	4
AUS	Benjamin Mitchell	221	5
SVK	Kamil Čapkovič	237	6
RSA	Raven Klaasen	244	7
GER	Sebastian Rieschick	257	8

- ^{1} Rankings are as of 30 January 2012.

=== Other entrants ===
The following players received wildcards into the singles main draw:

- (Australia) Colin Ebelthite
- (Australia) Adam Feeney
- (Australia) Luke Saville
- (Australia) Andrew Whittington

The following players received entry from the qualifying draw:

- (Australia) Maverick Banes
- (Australia) Matthew Barton
- (Australia) Nick Lindahl
- (Australia) Nima Roshan

== Champions ==
=== Singles ===
(Australia) Marinko Matosevic def. (Australia) Greg Jones, 6–0, 6–2

=== Doubles ===
(Australia) John Peers / (Australia) John-Patrick Smith def. (United States) John Paul Fruttero / (South Africa) Raven Klaasen, 7–6^{(7–5)}, 6–4
