= 2012 Caloundra International – Singles =

Singles
- 2012 Caloundra International

Final
- Champion: (Australia) Marinko Matosevic
- Runner-up: (Australia) Greg Jones
- Score: 6–0, 6–2

Events
Singles	Doubles
← 2011 ·	Caloundra International	· 2013 →

Grega Žemlja was the defending champion, but decided not to participate.

Marinko Matosevic won the title, defeating Greg Jones in the final, 6–0, 6–2.

== Seeds ==
1. (Chinese Taipei) Lu Yen-hsun (semifinals)
2. (Australia) Marinko Matosevic (champion)
3. (Australia) James Duckworth (semifinals)
4. (Australia) Greg Jones (final)
5. (Australia) Benjamin Mitchell (quarterfinals)
6. (Slovakia) Kamil Čapkovič (first round)
7. (South Africa) Raven Klaasen (first round)
8. (Germany) Sebastian Rieschick (quarterfinals)

== Draw ==
=== Key ===
- Q = Qualifier
- WC = Wild card
- LL = Lucky loser
- Alt = Alternate
- SE = Special exempt
- PR = Protected ranking
- ITF = ITF entry
- JE = Junior exempt
- w/o = Walkover
- r = Retired
- d = Defaulted
- SR = Special ranking

=== Finals ===
Semifinals
1	(Chinese Taipei) Lu Yen-hsun	3	7^{7}	6^{3}
4	(Australia) Greg Jones	6	6^{5}	7^{7}
3	(Australia) James Duckworth	6^{5}	3
2	(Australia) Marinko Matosevic	7^{7}	6

Final
4	(Australia) Greg Jones	0	2
2	(Australia) Marinko Matosevic	6	6

=== Top half ===
First round
1	(Chinese Taipei) Y-h Lu	6	6
Q	(Australia) N Lindahl	2	3
(Australia) Isaac Frost	2	3
(Australia) M Reid	6	6
(Australia) J-P Smith	3	7	6
(United States) B Strode	6	5	3
(United Kingdom) J Milton	3	1
5	(Australia) B Mitchell	6	6
4	(Australia) G Jones	6	6
(Australia) Michael Look	3	4
WC	(Australia) C Ebelthite	3	4
WC	(Australia) L Saville	6	6
(Australia) J Millman	6	6
(Australia) J Peers	3	1
(Switzerland) H Laaksonen	6	6
7	(South Africa) R Klaasen	1	3

Second round
1	(Chinese Taipei) Y-h Lu	6	6
(Australia) M Reid	3	2
(Australia) J-P Smith	4	5
5	(Australia) B Mitchell	6	7
4	(Australia) G Jones	6	6
WC	(Australia) L Saville	2	3
(Australia) J Millman	6	7
(Switzerland) H Laaksonen	2	5

Quarterfinals
1	(Chinese Taipei) Y-h Lu	6	6
5	(Australia) B Mitchell	4	1
4	(Australia) G Jones	3	6	6
(Australia) J Millman	6	3	4

Semifinals
1	(Chinese Taipei) Y-h Lu	3	7^{7}	6^{3}
4	(Australia) G Jones	6	6^{5}	7^{7}

=== Bottom half ===
First round
6	(Slovakia) K Čapkovič	3	6	3
(Australia) B Klein	6	3	6
Q	(Australia) M Barton	1	0
(Chinese Taipei) J Wang	6	6
(India) V Vardhan	6	7
Q	(Australia) Nima Roshan	4	6^{8}
WC	(Australia) A Feeney	6	6^{2}	3
3	(Australia) J Duckworth	4	7	6
8	(Germany) S Rieschick	3	7	7
WC	(Australia) A Whittington	6	6^{3}	5
Q	(Australia) M Banes	7	4	4
(Australia) S Groth	6^{4}	6	6
(Canada) É Chvojka	6	6
(South Korea) W-s Jun	3	2
(Australia) J Lemke	4	3
2	(Australia) M Matosevic	6	6

Second round
(Australia) B Klein	5	6	6
(Chinese Taipei) J Wang	7	4	3
(India) V Vardhan	4	5
3	(Australia) J Duckworth	6	6
8	(Germany) S Rieschick	6	6^{5}	6
(Australia) S Groth	1	7	2
(Canada) É Chvojka	4	2
2	(Australia) M Matosevic	6	6

Quarterfinals
(Australia) B Klein	6	3	2
3	(Australia) J Duckworth	4	6	6
8	(Germany) S Rieschick	7	6^{5}	4
2	(Australia) M Matosevic	5	7^{7}	6

Semifinals
3	(Australia) J Duckworth	6^{5}	3
2	(Australia) M Matosevic	7^{7}	6
