= Shannon Nettle =

Australian tennis player

- Country (sports): Australia
- Born: 10 June 1978 (age 47) Naracoorte, South Australia
- Plays: Right-handed
- Prize money: $52,822

Singles
- Highest ranking: No. 339 (4 October 2004)

Grand Slam singles results
- Australian Open: Q3 (2005)

Doubles
- Career record: 0–2
- Highest ranking: No. 360 (9 October 2006)

Grand Slam doubles results
- Australian Open: 1R (2005, 2006)

Shannon Nettle (born 10 June 1978) is an Australian former professional tennis player.

== Biography ==
Nettle comes from rural South Australia, born in the town of Naracoorte and growing up on the family vineyard in Cobdogla. He is a cousin of tennis player Luke Saville.

A right-handed player, Nettle played college tennis in the United States for Troy University before turning professional. He was at the Alabama based university of four years.

Nettle reached a career best singles ranking of 339 in the world, which he attained in 2004. He made the final qualifying round of the 2005 Australian Open, with wins over Kristof Vliegen and Vasilis Mazarakis. As a doubles player he twice appeared as a wildcard in the main draw of the Australian Open, partnering Sadik Kadir in 2005 and Peter Luczak in 2006. On both occasions he and his partner were beaten in the first round, by seeded opponents. His biggest title win came in doubles at the 2005 Caloundra International Challenger, partnered with Peter Luczak, who he later coached on tour.

Retiring in 2006, he turned his attention to coaching and has been a coach for the Australian Institute of Sport. He was coach of Casey Dellacqua when she broke into the world's top 30 singles rankings in 2014.

== Challenger titles ==
=== Doubles: (1) ===
| No. | Year | Tournament | Surface | Partner | Opponents | Score |
|---|---|---|---|---|---|---|
| 1. | 2005 | Caloundra, Australia | Hard | (Australia) Peter Luczak | (Australia) Robert Smeets (Serbia and Montenegro) Alex Vlaški | 6–7^{(4)}, 6–4, 6–2 |
