= 2015 U.S. Men's Clay Court Championships – Singles =

Singles
- 2015 U.S. Men's Clay Court Championships

Final
- Champion: (United States) Jack Sock
- Runner-up: (United States) Sam Querrey
- Score: 7–6^{(11–9)}, 7–6^{(7–2)}

Details
- Draw: 28
- Seeds: 8

Events
Singles	Doubles
- U.S. Men's Clay Court Championships

Fernando Verdasco was the defending champion, but lost to Sam Querrey in the semifinals.
Jack Sock won his first ATP singles title, defeating Querrey in the final, 7–6^{(11–9)}, 7–6^{(7–2)}.

== Seeds ==
The top four seeds receive a bye into the second round.

1. (Spain) Feliciano López (quarterfinals)
2. (Spain) Roberto Bautista Agut (second round)
3. (South Africa) Kevin Anderson (semifinals)
4. (United States) John Isner (second round)
5. (Colombia) Santiago Giraldo (quarterfinals)
6. (Spain) Fernando Verdasco (semifinals)
7. (France) Jérémy Chardy (quarterfinals)
8. (United States) Sam Querrey (final)

== Draw ==
Key

- Q = Qualifier
- WC = Wild card
- LL = Lucky loser
- Alt = Alternate
- ITF = ITF entry
- PR = Protected ranking
- SR = Special ranking
- SE = Special exempt
- JE = Junior exempt
- JR = Junior Accelerator Programme entrant
- CO = College Accelerator Programme entrant
- NG = Next Gen Accelerator Program entrant
- w/o = Walkover
- r = Retired
- d = Defaulted

=== Finals ===
Semifinals
8	(United States) Sam Querrey	7	2	6
6	(Spain) Fernando Verdasco	5	6	4
3	(South Africa) Kevin Anderson	6^{3}	3
(United States) Jack Sock	7^{7}	6

Final
8	(United States) Sam Querrey	6^{9}	6^{2}
(United States) Jack Sock	7^{11}	7^{7}

=== Top half ===
First round
(Dominican Republic) V Estrella Burgos	6^{3}	4
(Australia) S Groth	7^{7}	6
(United States) D Young	5	4
(United States) S Johnson	7	6
(Australia) M Matosevic	1^{r}
8	(United States) S Querrey	4
(United States) T Smyczek	3	3
(Russia) T Gabashvili	6	6
Q	(South Korea) H Chung	6	7
Q	(Argentina) F Argüello	3	5
(Italy) P Lorenzi	3	3^{r}
6	(Spain) F Verdasco	6	4

Second round
1/WC	(Spain) F López	6	6
(Australia) S Groth	3	3
(United States) S Johnson	1	6	0
8	(United States) S Querrey	6	4	6
4	(United States) J Isner	2	6^{2}
(Russia) T Gabashvili	6	7^{7}
Q	(South Korea) H Chung	6^{5}	2
6	(Spain) F Verdasco	7^{7}	6

Quarterfinals
1/WC	(Spain) F López	4	1
8	(United States) S Querrey	6	6
(Russia) T Gabashvili	2	3
6	(Spain) F Verdasco	6	6

Semifinals
8	(United States) S Querrey	7	2	6
6	(Spain) F Verdasco	5	6	4

=== Bottom half ===
First round
7	(France) J Chardy	6	6
(Serbia) D Lajović	4	4
(Japan) G Soeda	4	7^{7}	6
WC	(Australia) L Hewitt	6	6^{3}	3
(Lithuania) R Berankis	2	6^{5}
(Argentina) F Delbonis	6	7^{7}
5	(Colombia) S Giraldo	6	6
Q	(Brazil) R Dutra Silva	2	2
WC	(Serbia) J Tipsarević	6	3	7^{9}
Q	(Brazil) G Clezar	4	6	6^{7}
(Brazil) J Souza	7	4	2
(United States) J Sock	5	6	6

Second round
7	(France) J Chardy	6	6
(Japan) G Soeda	3	3
(Argentina) F Delbonis	7^{7}	0	3
3	(South Africa) K Anderson	6^{4}	6	6
5	(Colombia) S Giraldo	7^{7}	6
WC	(Serbia) J Tipsarević	6^{2}	3
(United States) J Sock	6	6
2	(Spain) R Bautista Agut	4	4

Quarterfinals
7	(France) J Chardy	5	7^{8}	6^{3}
3	(South Africa) K Anderson	7	6^{6}	7^{7}
5	(Colombia) S Giraldo	4	4
(United States) J Sock	6	6

Semifinals
3	(South Africa) K Anderson	6^{3}	3
(United States) J Sock	7^{7}	6

== Qualifying ==
=== Seeds ===
1. (Austria) Jürgen Melzer (first round)
2. (Colombia) Alejandro González (first round)
3. (Japan) Tatsuma Ito (first round)
4. (Argentina) Facundo Bagnis (second round)
5. (United States) Ryan Harrison (first round)
6. (South Korea) Chung Hyeon (qualified)
7. (Portugal) Gastão Elias (first round)
8. (Germany) Alexander Zverev (first round)

=== Qualifiers ===
1. (Argentina) Facundo Argüello
2. (South Korea) Chung Hyeon
3. (Brazil) Rogério Dutra Silva
4. (Brazil) Guilherme Clezar

=== Qualifying draw ===
==== First qualifier ====
First round
1	(Austria) Jürgen Melzer	6^{2}	1
(Argentina) Andrea Collarini	7^{7}	6
(United States) Alex Kuznetsov	4	2
(Argentina) Facundo Argüello	6	6
(United States) Denis Kudla	6	6
(Zimbabwe) Takanyi Garanganga	4	2
(United States) Jared Donaldson	7^{7}	3	6
7	(Portugal) Gastão Elias	6^{1}	6	4

Second round
(Argentina) Andrea Collarini	6^{4}	5
(Argentina) Facundo Argüello	7^{7}	7
(United States) Denis Kudla	6	6
(United States) Jared Donaldson	3	3

Qualifying competition
(Argentina) Facundo Argüello	6	7
(United States) Denis Kudla	3	5

==== Second qualifier ====
First round
2	(Colombia) Alejandro González	4	2
PR	(Germany) Mischa Zverev	6	6
(Brazil) Fabiano de Paula	7	2	6
(Australia) Jason Kubler	5	6	3
WC	(United States) Ryan Sweeting	6	6
WC	(United States) Tennys Sandgren	3	3
(United States) Michael Russell	6	2	4
6	(South Korea) Chung Hyeon	4	6	6

Second round
PR	(Germany) Mischa Zverev	6	6
(Brazil) Fabiano de Paula	2	2
WC	(United States) Ryan Sweeting	1	1
6	(South Korea) Chung Hyeon	6	6

Qualifying competition
PR	(Germany) Mischa Zverev	3	5
6	(South Korea) Chung Hyeon	6	7

==== Third qualifier ====
First round
3	(Japan) Tatsuma Ito	6	5	6^{4}
(Brazil) Rogério Dutra Silva	4	7	7^{7}
(Russia) Mikhail Ledovskikh	2	6	2
(India) Sanam Singh	6	3	6
WC	(United States) Greg Ouellette	3	4
(Japan) Yoshihito Nishioka	6	6
(Brazil) Thiago Monteiro	4	7^{7}	6
5	(United States) Ryan Harrison	6	6^{4}	2

Second round
(Brazil) Rogério Dutra Silva	6	6
(India) Sanam Singh	3	0
(Japan) Yoshihito Nishioka	4	6	6^{4}
(Brazil) Thiago Monteiro	6	2	7^{7}

Qualifying competition
(Brazil) Rogério Dutra Silva	6	6^{5}	6
(Brazil) Thiago Monteiro	0	7^{7}	1

==== Fourth qualifier ====
First round
4	(Argentina) Facundo Bagnis	6	6
(United Kingdom) Alexander Ward	4	4
(Brazil) Guilherme Clezar	7^{7}	7^{7}
WC	(United States) Sekou Bangoura	6^{3}	6^{4}
(Australia) Matt Reid	3	1
(India) Somdev Devvarman	6	6
(United States) Robby Ginepri	6	6
8	(Germany) Alexander Zverev	3	2

Second round
4	(Argentina) Facundo Bagnis	2	6^{4}
(Brazil) Guilherme Clezar	6	7^{7}
(India) Somdev Devvarman	7^{8}	6
(United States) Robby Ginepri	6^{6}	3

Qualifying competition
(Brazil) Guilherme Clezar	6	6
(India) Somdev Devvarman	4	4
