= 2016 Busan Open – Doubles =

Doubles
- 2016 Busan Open

Final
- Champion: (Australia) Sam Groth (India) Leander Paes
- Runner-up: (Thailand) Sanchai Ratiwatana (Thailand) Sonchat Ratiwatana
- Score: 4–6, 6–1, [10–7]

Events
Singles	Doubles
← 2015 ·	Busan Open	· 2017 →

Sanchai and Sonchat Ratiwatana were the defending champions but lost in the final to Sam Groth and Leander Paes 4–6, 6–1, [10–7].

== Seeds ==
1. (Australia) Sam Groth / (India) Leander Paes (champions)
2. (Thailand) Sanchai Ratiwatana / (Thailand) Sonchat Ratiwatana (final)
3. (India) Purav Raja / (India) Divij Sharan (semifinals)
4. (China) Gong Maoxin / (Chinese Taipei) Yi Chu-huan (first round)

== Draw ==
=== Key ===
- Q = Qualifier
- WC = Wild card
- LL = Lucky loser
- Alt = Alternate
- SE = Special exempt
- PR = Protected ranking
- ITF = ITF entry
- JE = Junior exempt
- w/o = Walkover
- r = Retired
- d = Defaulted
- SR = Special ranking

First round
1	(Australia) S Groth (India) L Paes	6	7^{7}
(United States) D Nguyen (China) D Wu	3	6^{4}
(United States) A Krajicek (United States) A Sarkissian	2	3
(Australia) M Reid (Australia) J-P Smith	6	6
4	(China) M Gong (Chinese Taipei) C-h Yi	6	3	[4]
(Denmark) F Nielsen (Republic of Ireland) D O'Hare	3	6	[10]
WC	(South Korea) J-s Nam (South Korea) M-k Song	6	3	[10]
WC	(South Korea) Kim Cheong-eui (South Korea) Noh Sang-woo	4	6	[6]
(Russia) A Kudryavtsev (China) Z Zhang	6	6
WC	(South Korea) Ho Chung (South Korea) Hy Chung	4	1
Q	(United Kingdom) L Glasspool (United Kingdom) A Ward	4	6^{8}
3	(India) P Raja (India) D Sharan	6	7^{10}
(United States) J Cerretani (United States) M Schnur	6	6
(Chinese Taipei) T Chen (Japan) Y Sugita	2	4
(Switzerland) M Chiudinelli (Ukraine) S Stakhovsky	5	7	[11]
2	(Thailand) Sa Ratiwatana (Thailand) So Ratiwatana	7	5	[13]

Quarterfinals
1	(Australia) S Groth (India) L Paes	6	5	[10]
(Australia) M Reid (Australia) J-P Smith	3	7	[5]
(Denmark) F Nielsen (Republic of Ireland) D O'Hare	3	6	[6]
WC	(South Korea) J-s Nam (South Korea) M-k Song	6	3	[10]
(Russia) A Kudryavtsev (China) Z Zhang	3	4
3	(India) P Raja (India) D Sharan	6	6
(United States) J Cerretani (United States) M Schnur	1	7^{7}	[8]
2	(Thailand) Sa Ratiwatana (Thailand) So Ratiwatana	6	6^{5}	[10]

Semifinals
1	(Australia) S Groth (India) L Paes	6	6
WC	(South Korea) J-s Nam (South Korea) M-k Song	3	4
3	(India) P Raja (India) D Sharan	4	2
2	(Thailand) Sa Ratiwatana (Thailand) So Ratiwatana	6	6

Final
1	(Australia) S Groth (India) L Paes	4	6	[10]
2	(Thailand) Sa Ratiwatana (Thailand) So Ratiwatana	6	1	[7]
