= 2015 U.S. Men's Clay Court Championships – Doubles =

Doubles
- 2015 U.S. Men's Clay Court Championships

Final
- Champions: (Lithuania) Ričardas Berankis (Russia) Teymuraz Gabashvili
- Runners-up: (Philippines) Treat Huey (United States) Scott Lipsky
- Score: 6–4, 6–4

Details
- Draw: 16
- Seeds: 4

Events
Singles	Doubles
- U.S. Men's Clay Court Championships

Bob Bryan and Mike Bryan were the defending champions, but lost to Ričardas Berankis and Teymuraz Gabashvili in the quarterfinals. Berankis and Gabashvili went on to win the title, defeating Treat Huey and Scott Lipsky in the final, 6–4, 6–4.

== Seeds ==
1. (United States) Bob Bryan / (United States) Mike Bryan (quarterfinals)
2. (United States) Eric Butorac / (Australia) Sam Groth (first round)
3. (Sweden) Robert Lindstedt / (Austria) Jürgen Melzer (semifinals)
4. (Poland) Mariusz Fyrstenberg / (Mexico) Santiago González (semifinals, retired)

== Draw ==
Key

- Q = Qualifier
- WC = Wild card
- LL = Lucky loser
- Alt = Alternate
- ITF = ITF entry
- PR = Protected ranking
- SR = Special ranking
- SE = Special exempt
- JE = Junior exempt
- JR = Junior Accelerator Programme entrant
- CO = College Accelerator Programme entrant
- NG = Next Gen Accelerator Program entrant
- w/o = Walkover
- r = Retired
- d = Defaulted

=== Draw ===
First round
1	(United States) B Bryan (United States) M Bryan	5	6	[13]
WC	(Germany) P Petzschner (Serbia) J Tipsarević	7	2	[11]
(Argentina) F Delbonis (Serbia) D Lajović	6	2	[17]
Alt	(Lithuania) R Berankis (Russia) T Gabashvili	4	6	[19]
3	(Sweden) R Lindstedt (Austria) J Melzer	7	6
(Australia) C Guccione (Brazil) A Sá	5	4
(New Zealand) M Daniell (Colombia) S Giraldo	7	7
(Israel) J Erlich (Pakistan) A-u-H Qureshi	5	5
(Dominican Republic) V Estrella Burgos (Brazil) J Souza	6	7
(South Africa) K Anderson (Germany) F Moser	4	5
WC	(Australia) L Hewitt (Australia) M Reid	4	4
4	(Poland) M Fyrstenberg (Mexico) S González	6	6
(Sweden) J Brunström (United States) D Young	6	6
Alt	(India) S Devvarman (India) S Singh	3	1
(Philippines) T Huey (United States) S Lipsky	7^{7}	6^{2}	[12]
2	(United States) E Butorac (Australia) S Groth	6^{4}	7^{7}	[10]

Quarterfinals
1	(United States) B Bryan (United States) M Bryan	6^{7}	5
Alt	(Lithuania) R Berankis (Russia) T Gabashvili	7^{9}	7
3	(Sweden) R Lindstedt (Austria) J Melzer	6	6
(New Zealand) M Daniell (Colombia) S Giraldo	4	1
(Dominican Republic) V Estrella Burgos (Brazil) J Souza	3	1
4	(Poland) M Fyrstenberg (Mexico) S González	6	6
(Sweden) J Brunström (United States) D Young	7	4	[8]
(Philippines) T Huey (United States) S Lipsky	5	6	[10]

Semifinals
Alt	(Lithuania) R Berankis (Russia) T Gabashvili	6	6
3	(Sweden) R Lindstedt (Austria) J Melzer	3	4
4	(Poland) M Fyrstenberg (Mexico) S González	7^{7}	3^{r}
(Philippines) T Huey (United States) S Lipsky	6^{3}	4

Final
Alt	(Lithuania) R Berankis (Russia) T Gabashvili	6	6
(Philippines) T Huey (United States) S Lipsky	4	4
