= 2012 Delray Beach International Tennis Championships – Doubles =

Doubles
- 2012 Delray Beach International Tennis Championships

Final
- Champions: (United Kingdom) Colin Fleming (United Kingdom) Ross Hutchins
- Runners-up: (Slovakia) Michal Mertiňák (Brazil) André Sá
- Score: 2–6, 7–6^{(7–5)}, [15–13]

Events
Singles	Doubles
← 2011 ·	Delray Beach Open	· 2013 →

Scott Lipsky and Rajeev Ram were the defending champions but chose not to participate.
Colin Fleming and Ross Hutchins defeated Michal Mertiňák and André Sá 2–6, 7–6^{(7–5)}, [15–13] in the final to win the title.

== Seeds ==
1. (United States) Bob Bryan / (United States) Mike Bryan (quarterfinals)
2. (Austria) Jürgen Melzer / (Germany) Philipp Petzschner (withdrew due to Melzer's back injury)
3. (United Kingdom) Colin Fleming / (United Kingdom) Ross Hutchins (champions)
4. (The Bahamas) Mark Knowles / (Belgium) Xavier Malisse (quarterfinals)

== Draw ==
=== Key ===
- Q = Qualifier
- WC = Wild card
- LL = Lucky loser
- Alt = Alternate
- SE = Special exempt
- PR = Protected ranking
- ITF = ITF entry
- JE = Junior exempt
- w/o = Walkover
- r = Retired
- d = Defaulted
- SR = Special ranking

=== Draw ===
First round
1	(United States) B Bryan (United States) M Bryan	7^{7}	6
(Finland) J Nieminen (Serbia) V Troicki	6^{4}	2
(Croatia) I Karlović (Germany) F Moser	7	7^{8}
(Croatia) M Čilić (Croatia) I Dodig	5	6^{6}
4	(The Bahamas) M Knowles (Belgium) X Malisse	6	6
Alt	(Italy) S Ianni (United States) D Kudla	4	3
(Slovakia) M Mertiňák (Brazil) A Sá	6	3	[10]
(Belgium) D Norman (Sweden) A Siljeström	4	6	[5]
WC	(United States) N Monroe (United States) J Sock	7^{12}	3	[2]
(Belgium) S Darcis (Belgium) O Rochus	6^{10}	6	[10]
(United States) R Sweeting (Australia) B Tomic	4	5
3	(United Kingdom) C Fleming (United Kingdom) R Hutchins	6	7
WC	(United States) J Levine (United States) B Reynolds	4	6^{6}
(Colombia) R Farah (Philippines) TC Huey	6	7^{8}
(Russia) M Elgin (Uzbekistan) D Istomin	6	6
Alt	(United Kingdom) J Ward (United States) M Yani	4	2

Quarterfinals
1	(United States) B Bryan (United States) M Bryan	6	4	[4]
(Croatia) I Karlović (Germany) F Moser	4	6	[10]
4	(The Bahamas) M Knowles (Belgium) X Malisse	6^{4}	4
(Slovakia) M Mertiňák (Brazil) A Sá	7^{7}	6
(Belgium) S Darcis (Belgium) O Rochus	1	2
3	(United Kingdom) C Fleming (United Kingdom) R Hutchins	6	6
(Colombia) R Farah (Philippines) TC Huey	2	6	[8]
(Russia) M Elgin (Uzbekistan) D Istomin	6	3	[10]

Semifinals
(Croatia) I Karlović (Germany) F Moser	4	4
(Slovakia) M Mertiňák (Brazil) A Sá	6	6
3	(United Kingdom) C Fleming (United Kingdom) R Hutchins	7^{8}	6
(Russia) M Elgin (Uzbekistan) D Istomin	6^{6}	4

Final
(Slovakia) M Mertiňák (Brazil) A Sá	6	6^{5}	[13]
3	(United Kingdom) C Fleming (United Kingdom) R Hutchins	2	7^{7}	[15]
