= 2011 Rogers Cup – Men's singles qualifying =

This article shows the Qualifying Draw for the 2011 Rogers Cup.

== Players ==
=== Seeds ===
1. (United States) Alex Bogomolov Jr. (qualified)
2. (Chinese Taipei) Lu Yen-hsun (qualifying competition) (lucky loser)
3. (Germany) Philipp Petzschner (qualified)
4. (Germany) Tobias Kamke (qualified)
5. (Colombia) Alejandro Falla (qualified)
6. (Italy) Flavio Cipolla (qualified)
7. (Turkey) Marsel İlhan (qualifying competition)
8. (United States) Michael Russell (qualified)
9. (Australia) Matthew Ebden (qualifying competition)
10. (Australia) Marinko Matosevic (qualifying competition)
11. (Ukraine) Sergei Bubka (first round)
12. (South Africa) Fritz Wolmarans (first round)
13. (United States) Michael Yani (qualified)
14. (Bosnia and Herzegovina) Amer Delić (qualifying competition)

=== Qualifiers ===
1. (United States) Alex Bogomolov Jr.
2. (United States) Michael Yani
3. (Germany) Philipp Petzschner
4. (Germany) Tobias Kamke
5. (Colombia) Alejandro Falla
6. (Italy) Flavio Cipolla
7. (United States) Michael Russell

=== Lucky losers ===
1. (Chinese Taipei) Lu Yen-hsun

== Results ==
=== First qualifier ===
First round
1	(United States) Alex Bogomolov Jr.
bye
(Mexico) Daniel Garza	5	1
10	(Australia) Marinko Matosevic	7	6

Qualifying competition
1	(United States) Alex Bogomolov Jr.	7^{7}	4	6
10	(Australia) Marinko Matosevic	6^{0}	6	3

=== Second qualifier ===
First round
2	(Chinese Taipei) Lu Yen-hsun
bye
Alt	(Canada) Steven Diez	0	3
13	(United States) Michael Yani	6	6

Qualifying competition
2	(Chinese Taipei) Lu Yen-hsun	4	4
13	(United States) Michael Yani	6	6

=== Third qualifier ===
First round
3	(Germany) Philipp Petzschner	6	6
(United States) Nicholas Monroe	2	4
(United States) Greg Ouellette	4	7^{7}	6
12	(South Africa) Fritz Wolmarans	6	6^{4}	3

Qualifying competition
3	(Germany) Philipp Petzschner	6	6
(United States) Greg Ouellette	4	4

=== Fourth qualifier ===
First round
4	(Germany) Tobias Kamke	6^{2}	6	6
Alt	(New Zealand) Artem Sitak	7^{7}	3	3
(Canada) Pierre-Ludovic Duclos	4	6^{4}
9	(Australia) Matthew Ebden	6	7^{7}

Qualifying competition
4	(Germany) Tobias Kamke	6^{5}	6	6
9	(Australia) Matthew Ebden	7^{7}	3	2

=== Fifth qualifier ===
First round
5	(Colombia) Alejandro Falla	6^{2}	6	6
(United States) Zack Fleishman	7^{7}	2	2
(United States) Kevin Kim	3	3
14	(Bosnia and Herzegovina) Amer Delić	6	6

Qualifying competition
5	(Colombia) Alejandro Falla	6	6
14	(Bosnia and Herzegovina) Amer Delić	3	2

=== Sixth qualifier ===
First round
6	(Italy) Flavio Cipolla	6	6
WC	(Switzerland) George Bastl	3	1
(United States) Jesse Levine	6	2	7^{7}
11	(Ukraine) Sergei Bubka	4	6	6^{4}

Qualifying competition
6	(Italy) Flavio Cipolla	6	6
(United States) Jesse Levine	2	1

=== Seventh qualifier ===
First round
7	(Turkey) Marsel İlhan	6	6
WC	(United States) William Boe-Wiegaard	3	4
(Japan) Toshihide Matsui	4	7	4
8	(United States) Michael Russell	6	5	6

Qualifying competition
7	(Turkey) Marsel İlhan	5	2
8	(United States) Michael Russell	7	6
