= 2011 Delray Beach International Tennis Championships – Doubles =

Doubles
- 2011 Delray Beach International Tennis Championships

Final
- Champions: (United States) Scott Lipsky (United States) Rajeev Ram
- Runners-up: (Germany) Christopher Kas (Austria) Alexander Peya
- Score: 4–6, 6–4, [10–3]

Events
| Singles | Doubles |
| ← 2010 · | Delray Beach Open | · 2012 → |

Bob Bryan and Mike Bryan were the defending champions, but decided not to participate.
Scott Lipsky and Rajeev Ram won this tournament after defeating Christopher Kas and Alexander Peya 4–6, 6–4, [10–3] in the final.

== Seeds ==
1. (United States) Eric Butorac / (Curaçao) Jean-Julien Rojer (semifinals)
2. (United States) John Isner / (United States) Sam Querrey (withdrew)
3. (Israel) Jonathan Erlich / (Israel) Andy Ram (first round)
4. (Germany) Dustin Brown / (Netherlands) Rogier Wassen (first round)

== Draw ==
=== Key ===
- Q = Qualifier
- WC = Wild card
- LL = Lucky loser
- Alt = Alternate
- SE = Special exempt
- PR = Protected ranking
- ITF = ITF entry
- JE = Junior exempt
- w/o = Walkover
- r = Retired
- d = Defaulted
- SR = Special ranking

=== Draw ===
First round
1 | (United States) E Butorac (Curaçao) J-J Rojer | 6 | 6
(Sweden) J Brunström (Slovakia) I Zelenay | 3 | 4
(Australia) A Fisher (Australia) S Huss | 6 | 4 | [10]
WC | (United States) J Sock (United States) D Young | 3 | 6 | [7]
3 | (Israel) J Erlich (Israel) A Ram | 2 | 6 | [2]
(United States) S Lipsky (United States) R Ram | 6 | 3 | [10]
(United Kingdom) C Fleming (United Kingdom) R Hutchins | 5 | 6^{5}
(United Kingdom) J Murray (United Kingdom) K Skupski | 7 | 7
(Croatia) I Dodig (Croatia) I Karlović | 6^{1} | 6^{3}
(Germany) B Becker (Germany) M Kohlmann | 7 | 7
(Germany) C Kas (Austria) A Peya | 7 | 6
4 | (Germany) D Brown (Netherlands) R Wassen | 5 | 4
(South Africa) K Anderson (United States) D Martin | 6^{6} | 3
(Brazil) F Ferreiro (Brazil) A Sá | 7 | 6
WC | (United States) J Cerretani (Canada) A Shamasdin | 3 | 4
Alt | (Australia) M Ebden (Australia) S Groth | 6 | 6

Quarterfinals
1 | (United States) E Butorac (Curaçao) J-J Rojer | 6 | 6
(Australia) A Fisher (Australia) S Huss | 1 | 4
(United States) S Lipsky (United States) R Ram | 7 | 6
(United Kingdom) J Murray (United Kingdom) K Skupski | 6^{3} | 3
(Germany) B Becker (Germany) M Kohlmann | 6 | 3 | [8]
(Germany) C Kas (Austria) A Peya | 4 | 6 | [10]
(Brazil) F Ferreiro (Brazil) A Sá | 7 | 6^{5} | [11]
Alt | (Australia) M Ebden (Australia) S Groth | 6^{4} | 7 | [9]

Semifinals
1 | (United States) E Butorac (Curaçao) J-J Rojer | 4 | 7 | [8]
(United States) S Lipsky (United States) R Ram | 6 | 6^{5} | [10]
(Germany) C Kas (Austria) A Peya | 7 | 3 | [10]
(Brazil) F Ferreiro (Brazil) A Sá | 6^{3} | 6 | [8]

Final
(United States) S Lipsky (United States) R Ram | 4 | 6 | [10]
(Germany) C Kas (Austria) A Peya | 6 | 4 | [3]
