= 2016 Busan Open =

- Date: 2–8 May
- Edition: 15th
- Draw: 32S / 16D
- Prize money: $100,000+H
- Surface: Hard
- Location: Busan, South Korea

Champions

Singles
- (Russia) Konstantin Kravchuk

Doubles
- (Australia) Sam Groth / (India) Leander Paes
← 2015 ·	Busan Open	· 2017 →

The 2016 Busan Open was a professional tennis tournament played on hard courts. It was the fifteenth edition of the tournament which was part of the 2016 ATP Challenger Tour. It took place in Busan, South Korea between 2 and 8 May 2016.

== Singles main-draw entrants ==
=== Seeds ===
Country	Player	Rank^{1}	Seed
LTU	Ričardas Berankis	55	1
AUS	John Millman	66	2
AUS	Sam Groth	80	3
KOR	Chung Hyeon	84	4
JPN	Tatsuma Ito	104	5
SVK	Lukáš Lacko	113	6
JPN	Yūichi Sugita	114	7
GER	Michael Berrer	115	8

* ^{1} Rankings as of April 25, 2016.

=== Other entrants ===
The following players received wildcards into the singles main draw:

- (South Korea) Oh Chan-yeong
- (South Korea) Kwon Soon-woo
- (South Korea) Hong Seong-chan
- (South Korea) Nam Ji-sung

The following player were given special exempt to gain entry into the singles main draw:

- (United Kingdom) Liam Broady

The following player entered as alternate:

- (United States) Daniel Nguyen

The following players received entry from the qualifying draw:

- (Australia) Matthew Barton
- (Chinese Taipei) Jimmy Wang
- (Poland) Michał Przysiężny
- (Australia) Marinko Matosevic

== Champions ==
=== Singles ===
- (Russia) Konstantin Kravchuk def. (United Kingdom) Daniel Evans, 6–4, 6–4

=== Doubles ===
- (Australia) Sam Groth / (India) Leander Paes def. (Thailand) Sanchai Ratiwatana / (Thailand) Sonchat Ratiwatana, 4–6, 6–1, [10–7]
