= 2012 Delray Beach International Tennis Championships – Singles =

Singles
- 2012 Delray Beach International Tennis Championships

Final
- Champion: (South Africa) Kevin Anderson
- Runner-up: (Australia) Marinko Matosevic
- Score: 6–4, 7–6^{(7–2)}

Details
- Draw: 32
- Seeds: 8

Events
Singles	Doubles
- Delray Beach Open

Juan Martín del Potro was the defending champion, but chose to compete in Dubai instead.
Kevin Anderson won the title after defeating Marinko Matosevic 6–4, 7–6^{(7–2)} in the final.

== Seeds ==
1. (United States) John Isner (semifinals)
2. (Croatia) Marin Čilić (first round)
3. (Serbia) Viktor Troicki (first round)
4. (United States) Andy Roddick (quarterfinals)
5. (Germany) Philipp Kohlschreiber (quarterfinals)
6. (Russia) Alex Bogomolov Jr. (second round)
7. (South Africa) Kevin Anderson (champion)
8. (Australia) Bernard Tomic (quarterfinals)

== Draw ==
Key

- Q = Qualifier
- WC = Wild card
- LL = Lucky loser
- Alt = Alternate
- ITF = ITF entry
- PR = Protected ranking
- SR = Special ranking
- SE = Special exempt
- JE = Junior exempt
- JR = Junior Accelerator Programme entrant
- CO = College Accelerator Programme entrant
- NG = Next Gen Accelerator Program entrant
- w/o = Walkover
- r = Retired
- d = Defaulted

=== Finals ===
Semifinals
1	(United States) John Isner	5	6^{4}
7	(South Africa) Kevin Anderson	7	7^{7}
Q	(Australia) Marinko Matosevic	5	6	7^{9}
(Israel) Dudi Sela	7	4	6^{7}

Final
7	(South Africa) Kevin Anderson	6	7^{7}
Q	(Australia) Marinko Matosevic	4	6^{2}

=== Top half ===
First round
1	(United States) J Isner	6	7^{17}
WC	(United States) J Levine	4	6^{15}
(United States) R Sweeting	6	6
(United States) D Young	1	1
Q	(United States) T Smyczek	6	2	7
(Austria) J Melzer	4	6	5
WC	(Germany) T Haas	4	3
8	(Australia) B Tomic	6	6
4	(United States) A Roddick	4	6	6
(Germany) P Petzschner	6	4	1
(Australia) M Ebden	2	3
(Uzbekistan) D Istomin	6	6
(Belgium) X Malisse	7^{7}	6
(Spain) G García-López	6^{3}	3
Q	(United States) A Krajicek	1	4
7	(South Africa) K Anderson	6	6

Second round
1	(United States) J Isner	6	6
(United States) R Sweeting	3	4
Q	(United States) T Smyczek	1	5
8	(Australia) B Tomic	6	7
4	(United States) A Roddick	6	7
(Uzbekistan) D Istomin	4	5
(Belgium) X Malisse	3	6	3
7	(South Africa) K Anderson	6	3	6

Quarterfinals
1	(United States) J Isner	6	6
8	(Australia) B Tomic	3	2
4	(United States) A Roddick	6	6^{9}	4
7	(South Africa) K Anderson	2	7^{11}	6

Semifinals
1	(United States) J Isner	5	6^{4}
7	(South Africa) K Anderson	7	7^{7}

=== Bottom half ===
First round
6	(Russia) A Bogomolov Jr.	6	6
Q	(United States) M Yani	3	1
Q	(Australia) M Matosevic	6	6
(Croatia) I Karlović	3	4
(Colombia) A Falla	4	1
(Latvia) E Gulbis	6	6
(Belgium) S Darcis	6	4	6
3	(Serbia) V Troicki	4	6	4
5	(Germany) P Kohlschreiber	6	6
(Belgium) O Rochus	1	4
(Croatia) I Dodig	4	6	6
(Germany) M Bachinger	6	4	4
WC	(United States) D Kudla	4	3
(Israel) D Sela	6	6
(Finland) J Nieminen	6	3	6
2	(Croatia) M Čilić	3	6	2

Second round
6	(Russia) A Bogomolov Jr.	6	1	3
Q	(Australia) M Matosevic	4	6	6
(Latvia) E Gulbis	6^{6}	6	6
(Belgium) S Darcis	7^{8}	1	3
5	(Germany) P Kohlschreiber	6	6
(Croatia) I Dodig	2	2
(Israel) D Sela	6	6
(Finland) J Nieminen	4	4

Quarterfinals
Q	(Australia) M Matosevic	3	6	6
(Latvia) E Gulbis	6	1	1
5	(Germany) P Kohlschreiber	4	7^{7}	0
(Israel) D Sela	6	6^{4}	6

Semifinals
Q	(Australia) M Matosevic	5	6	7^{9}
(Israel) D Sela	7	4	6^{7}

== Qualifying ==
=== Seeds ===
1. (Canada) Vasek Pospisil (first round)
2. (United States) Bobby Reynolds (second round)
3. (South Africa) Izak van der Merwe (second round)
4. (United States) Jesse Levine (Main draw)
5. (United Kingdom) James Ward (first round)
6. (Australia) Marinko Matosevic (qualified)
7. (United States) Michael Yani (qualified)
8. (Australia) Greg Jones (withdrew because of a knee injury)

=== Qualifiers ===
1. (Australia) Marinko Matosevic
2. (United States) Michael Yani
3. (United States) Austin Krajicek
4. (United States) Tim Smyczek

=== Draw ===
==== First qualifier ====
First round
1	(Canada) Vasek Pospisil	2	6	4
(Monaco) Benjamin Balleret	6	3	6
(Germany) Frank Moser	2	4
(Colombia) Robert Farah	6	6
(United States) Ty Trombetta	5	0
(United States) Blake Strode	7	6
(United States) Denis Zivkovic	1	3
6	(Australia) Marinko Matosevic	6	6

Second round
(Monaco) Benjamin Balleret	7	2	2
(Colombia) Robert Farah	5	6	6
(United States) Blake Strode	1	6^{2}
6	(Australia) Marinko Matosevic	6	7^{7}

Qualifying competition
(Colombia) Robert Farah	5	1
6	(Australia) Marinko Matosevic	7	6

==== Second qualifier ====
First round
2	(United States) Bobby Reynolds	6	6
(Italy) Stefano Ianni	4	4
(Germany) Mischa Zverev	6	6
(Haiti) Olivier Sajous	2	2
WC	(Russia) Mikhail Elgin	6	6
(Serbia) Vladimir Obradović	4	1
(Barbados) Darian King	2	4
7	(United States) Michael Yani	6	6

Second round
2	(United States) Bobby Reynolds	0	1
(Germany) Mischa Zverev	6	6
WC	(Russia) Mikhail Elgin	6^{6}	6	6^{5}
7	(United States) Michael Yani	7^{8}	3	7^{7}

Qualifying competition
(Germany) Mischa Zverev	6^{6}	6	5
7	(United States) Michael Yani	7^{8}	3	7

==== Third qualifier ====
First round
3	(South Africa) Izak van der Merwe	6	3	7^{7}
(Australia) Carsten Ball	4	6	6^{4}
(United States) Phillip Simmonds	7	4	3
(United States) Austin Krajicek	5	6	6
(New Zealand) Artem Sitak	6	7^{10}
WC	(United States) Sekou Bangoura	2	6^{8}
(United States) Nicholas Monroe	6	7^{7}
5	(United Kingdom) James Ward	2	6^{5}

Second round
3	(South Africa) Izak van der Merwe	6	3	4
(United States) Austin Krajicek	3	6	6
(New Zealand) Artem Sitak	6	2	3
(United States) Nicholas Monroe	4	6	6

Qualifying competition
(United States) Austin Krajicek	3	7^{8}	6
(United States) Nicholas Monroe	6	6^{6}	3

==== Fourth qualifier ====
First round
Alt	(United States) Patrick Davidson	5	1
WC	(United States) Dennis Lajola	7	6
(Barbados) Haydn Lewis	4	4
(United States) Tim Smyczek	6	6
WC	(United States) Matt Bocko	6	3	2
(Monaco) Jean-René Lisnard	4	6	6
(United States) Jack Sock	6^{6}	6	7^{7}
Alt	(United States) Reid Carleton	7^{8}	3	6^{2}

Second round
WC	(United States) Dennis Lajola	3	1
(United States) Tim Smyczek	6	6
(Monaco) Jean-René Lisnard	2	4
(United States) Jack Sock	6	6

Qualifying competition
(United States) Tim Smyczek	7^{7}	6
(United States) Jack Sock	6^{1}	2
