= 2011 Caloundra International =

- Date: 7–13 February
- Edition: 5th
- Location: Caloundra, Queensland, Australia

Champions

Singles
- (Slovenia) Grega Žemlja

Doubles
- (Australia) Matthew Ebden / (Australia) Samuel Groth
- Caloundra International

The 2011 Caloundra International was a professional tennis tournament played on outdoor hard courts in Queensland, Australia. It was part of the 2011 ATP Challenger Tour. It took place in Caloundra, Australia between 7 and 13 February 2011.

== ATP entrants ==
=== Seeds ===
Country	Player	Rank	Seed
AUS	Marinko Matosevic	142	1
CZE	Lukáš Rosol	143	2
ITA	Paolo Lorenzi	145	3
AUS	Carsten Ball	159	4
SLO	Grega Žemlja	166	5
CZE	Jan Hernych	174	6
AUS	Bernard Tomic	182	7
AUS	Matthew Ebden	201	8

- Rankings are as of 31 January 2011.

=== Other entrants ===
The following players received wildcards into the singles main draw:

- (Australia) Matthew Barton
- (Australia) James Duckworth
- (Australia) James Lemke
- (Australia) Benjamin Mitchell

The following players received a special exempt into the main draw:

- (Australia) Chris Guccione

The following players received entry from the qualifying draw:

- (Australia) Dayne Kelly
- (China) Wu Di
- (Chinese Taipei) Yang Tsung-hua
- (South Korea) Daniel Yoo

== Champions ==
=== Singles ===
(Slovenia) Grega Žemlja def. (Australia) Bernard Tomic, 7–6(4), 6–3

=== Doubles ===
(Australia) Matthew Ebden / (Australia) Samuel Groth def. (Slovakia) Pavol Červenák / (Slovakia) Ivo Klec, 6–3, 3–6, [10–1]
