= 2013 Delray Beach International Tennis Championships =

- Date: February 25 – March 3
- Edition: 21st
- Category: World Tour 250
- Draw: 32S / 16D
- Prize money: $455,775
- Surface: Hard / outdoor
- Location: Delray Beach, United States

Champions

Singles
- (Latvia) Ernests Gulbis

Doubles
- (United States) James Blake / (United States) Jack Sock
- Delray Beach Open

The 2013 Delray Beach International Tennis Championships was a professional men's tennis tournament played on hard courts. It was the 21st edition of the tournament which was part of the World Tour 250 series of the 2013 ATP World Tour. It took place in Delray Beach, United States between February 25 and March 3, 2013. Unseeded Ernests Gulbis, who entered the main draw as a qualifier, won the singles title.

== Finals ==
=== Singles ===
- (Latvia) Ernests Gulbis defeated (France) Édouard Roger-Vasselin, 7–6^{(7–3)}, 6–3

=== Doubles ===
- (United States) James Blake / (United States) Jack Sock defeated (Belarus) Max Mirnyi / (Romania) Horia Tecău, 6–4, 6–4

== Singles main-draw entrants ==
=== Seeds ===
Country	Player	Rank^{1}	Seed
USA	John Isner	16	1
GER	Tommy Haas	18	2
USA	Sam Querrey	21	3
JPN	Kei Nishikori	22	4
UKR	Alexandr Dolgopolov	23	5
RSA	Kevin Anderson	30	6
ESP	Feliciano López	47	7
BEL	Xavier Malisse	48	8

- Rankings are as of February 18, 2013.

=== Other entrants ===
The following players received wildcards into the singles main draw:

- (United States) James Blake
- (United States) Sam Querrey
- (United States) Jack Sock

The following players received entry from the qualifying draw:

- (Latvia) Ernests Gulbis
- (Spain) Daniel Muñoz de la Nava
- (United States) Bobby Reynolds
- (United States) Tim Smyczek

The following player received entry as lucky loser:

- (Lithuania) Ričardas Berankis

=== Withdrawals ===
Before the tournament

- (Croatia) Marin Čilić (fatigue)
- (United States) Mardy Fish (heart problems)
- (Slovakia) Lukáš Lacko
- (Spain) Feliciano López (arm injury)
- (France) Gaël Monfils
- (Slovenia) Grega Žemlja

=== Retirements ===
- (Japan) Kei Nishikori (side injury)
- (United States) Michael Russell (leg injury)
- (Netherlands) Igor Sijsling (ankle injury)

== Doubles main-draw entrants ==
=== Seeds ===
Country	Player	Country	Player	Rank^{1}	Seed
BLR	Max Mirnyi	ROU	Horia Tecău	17	1
CRO	Ivan Dodig	BRA	Marcelo Melo	49	2
GBR	Colin Fleming	AUS	John Peers	104	3
SWE	Johan Brunström	RSA	Raven Klaasen	105	4

- Rankings are as of February 18, 2013.

=== Other entrants ===
The following pairs received wildcards into the doubles main draw:

- (United States) James Blake / (United States) Jack Sock
- (Australia) Matthew Ebden / (United States) Michael Russell

=== Withdrawals ===
Before the tournament

- (Netherlands) Igor Sijsling (ankle injury)
