= Caloundra International =

Tennis tournament in Australia

- 2012 Caloundra International

ATP Challenger Tour
- Location: Caloundra, Queensland, Australia
- Category: ATP Challenger Tour
- Surface: Hard
- Draw: 32S/32Q/16D
- Prize money: $50,000
- Website: Official website

The Caloundra International is a tennis tournament held in Caloundra, Australia. In 2004, it was held in November as the Uncle Tobys Challenger in Caloundra, then as the Kia International in Caloundra from 2005 to 2006, and the Caloundra ATP Challenger in 2007. The tournament returned in February 2011 as the Elite Tennis International.

== Past finals ==
=== Singles ===
Year	Champion	Runner-up	Score
2012	(Australia) Marinko Matosevic	(Australia) Greg Jones	6–0, 6–2
2011	(Slovenia) Grega Žemlja	(Australia) Bernard Tomic	7–6(4), 6–3
2007	(Australia) Joseph Sirianni	(United States) Todd Widom	7–6(2), 7–6(5)
2006	(Chinese Taipei) Lu Yen-hsun	(Australia) Peter Luczak	6–3, 6–1
2005	(Australia) Peter Luczak	(Australia) Alun Jones	7–5, 7–6(1)
2004	(Chinese Taipei) Lu Yen-hsun	(Japan) Takahiro Terachi	6–0, 7–5

=== Doubles ===
Year	Champions	Runners-up	Score
2012	(Australia) John Peers (Australia) John-Patrick Smith	(United States) John Paul Fruttero (South Africa) Raven Klaasen	7–6^{(7–5)}, 6–4
2011	(Australia) Matthew Ebden (Australia) Samuel Groth	(Slovakia) Pavol Červenák (Slovakia) Ivo Klec	6–3, 3–6, [10–1]
2007	(Chinese Taipei) Chen Ti (South Korea) Jun Woong-sun	(Croatia) Ivan Cerović (Croatia) Vjekoslav Skenderović	6–2, 6–3
2006	(Australia) Nathan Healey (Australia) Robert Smeets	(Australia) Carsten Ball (Australia) Adam Feeney	6–3, 6–2
2005	(Australia) Peter Luczak (Australia) Shannon Nettle	(Australia) Robert Smeets (Serbia and Montenegro) Alex Vlaški	6–7(4), 6–4, 6–2
2004	(Australia) Luke Bourgeois (Chinese Taipei) Lu Yen-hsun	(Australia) Mark Hlawaty (Australia) Shannon Nettle	7–6(2), 7–5
