= Marinko Matosevic =

Australian tennis player

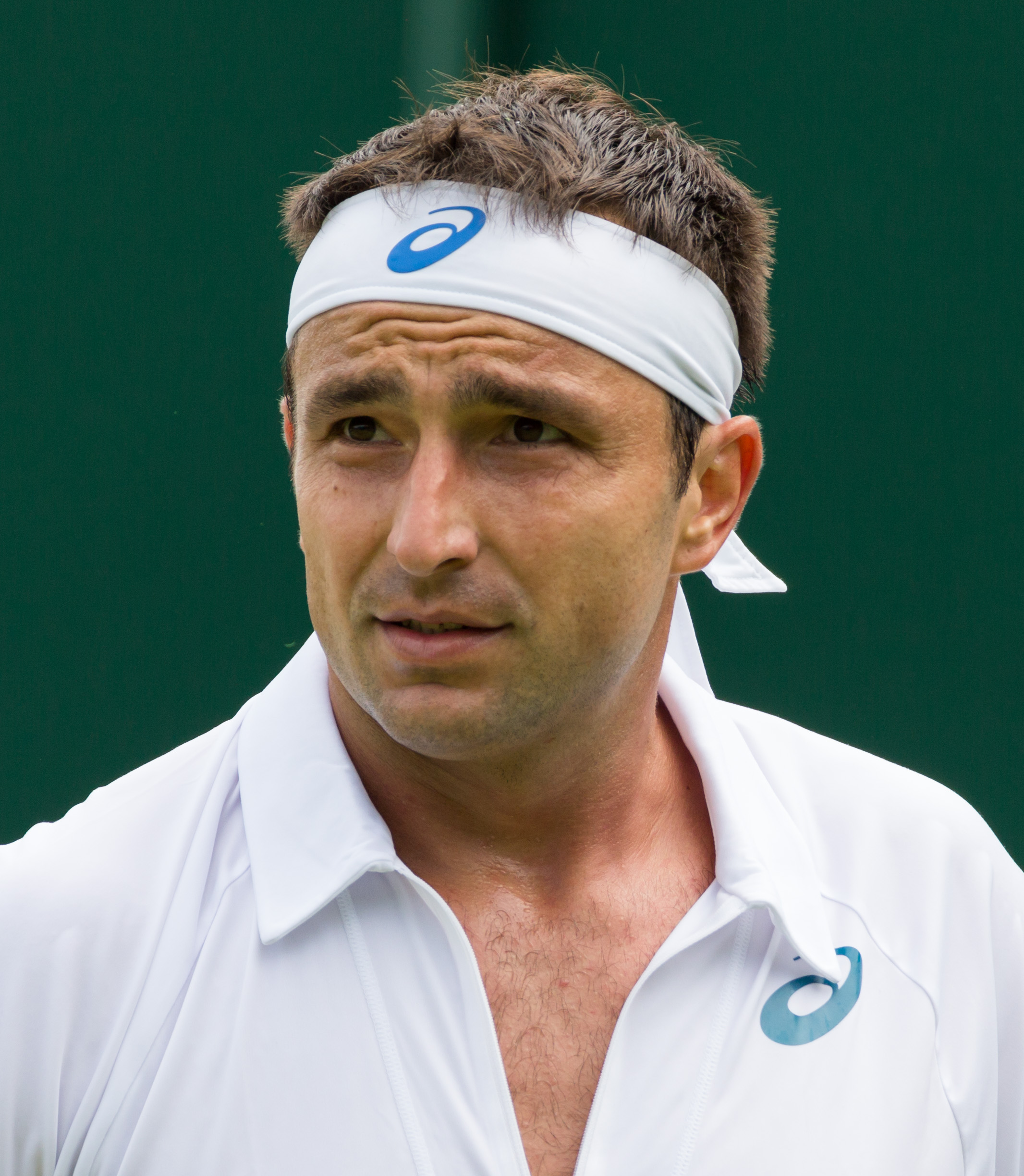
- Marinko Matosevic at the 2015 Wimbledon Championships
- Country (sports): Australia
- Residence: Melbourne, Victoria, Australia
- Born: 8 August 1985 (age 40) Jajce, Bosnia and Herzegovina, Yugoslavia
- Height: 1.93 m (6 ft 4 in)
- Turned pro: 2003
- Retired: 2018
- Plays: Right-handed (two-handed backhand)
- Prize money: $2,041,040

Singles
- Career record: 63–95 (Grand Slam, ATP Tour level, and Davis Cup)
- Career titles: 0
- Highest ranking: No. 39 (25 February 2013)

Grand Slam singles results
- Australian Open: 2R (2015)
- French Open: 2R (2014)
- Wimbledon: 2R (2014)
- US Open: 1R (2011, 2012, 2013, 2014)

Doubles
- Career record: 18–45 (Grand Slam, ATP Tour level, and Davis Cup)
- Career titles: 0
- Highest ranking: No. 114 (19 November 2012)

Grand Slam doubles results
- Australian Open: 2R (2012)
- French Open: 2R (2014)
- Wimbledon: 2R (2013)
- US Open: 3R (2012)

Grand Slam mixed doubles results
- Australian Open: 2R (2011)
- Last updated on: 28 December 2021.

Marinko Matosevic (Croatian: Marinko Matošević, pronounced [marǐːŋko matǒːʃeʋitɕ]; born 8 August 1985) is an Australian former professional tennis player and coach. His career-high singles ranking was World No. 39, which he achieved in February 2013.

Matosevic is currently serving a four-year ban set to expire in March 2030 for multiple anti-doping rule violations.

== Personal life ==
Matosevic was born in Jajce, Bosnia and Herzegovina, and is of Croat descent. During his childhood, Matosevic's parents, Branko and Ljubica, moved the family to Melbourne, Australia, and he competed for his adopted country during his career. While growing up, he played soccer, along with tennis, and is a fan of cricketer Shane Warne, as well as following the Sydney Swans in the Australian Football League.

== Tennis career and background ==
Starting tennis at age 10, he trained at the Universal Tennis Academy from age 13. Marinko was unable to obtain an ITF junior ranking. After achieving an ATP ranking inside the top 300 with Jay Salter, at the age of 24 Jay Salter hired Marc Kimmich as Marinko Matosevic coach of Pure Tennis Academy as his coach. Working with Kimmich as his coach Marinko was able to increase from 300 to the top 150 over the next 3 years. Marinko was last coached by former ATP Professional and doubles specialist Mark Woodforde.

Matosevic won five futures titles and four ATP Challenger titles. His biggest title was in July 2010 at the $75,000 Comerica Bank Challenger in Aptos, California where, in a heated match with American Donald Young, he won the title in straight sets.

=== 2010 ===
In January 2010, he played his first Grand Slam match in Melbourne at the Australian Open and lost in the first round.

He entered the 2010 BNP Paribas Open, in Indian Wells as a qualifier. He beat Michaël Llodra in the first round before losing out to No. 9 seed Tsonga.

Matosevic won his first challenger tournament at the 2010 Comerica Bank Challenger beating the Donald Young in the final. A second challenger title followed in Calabasas when he beat Ryan Sweeting.

=== 2011 ===
In February, Matosevic was seeded number 1 for the 2011 Caloundra International, on the ATP Challenger Tour. In the first round, he defeated Chinese qualifier Wu Di. In the second round, he faced fellow Australian Brydan Klein and won. In the quarterfinals, Matosevic lost to Danai Udomchoke from Thailand. He then went to America, where he entered the qualifying draw for the 2011 Delray Beach International Tennis Championship. He qualified, defeating Raven Klaasen, Bobby Reynolds and Igor Kunitsyn. He then took the place of number one seed Andy Roddick after he withdrew. In the first round, he lost to Dudi Sela of Israel.

=== 2012: Breakthrough, first ATP final ===
After an unsuccessful start to the 2012 season (which included four consecutive losses in home tournaments) Matosevic entered the 2012 Caloundra International as the No. 2 seed and steamrolled his way to the title where he defeated Greg Jones in the final.

Matosevic continued his form when he entered the 2012 Delray Beach International Tennis Championships and qualified for the main draw. In the first round he ousted Ivo Karlović, he followed up the victory with a second round win over Alex Bogomolov, Jr. In the quarterfinals Matosevic defeated Ernests Gulbis to reach the semifinal. In the semifinal Matosevic played Israeli Dudi Sela where he defeated him to reach his first ever ATP final, where ultimately he lost to South African Kevin Anderson in straight sets.

Matosevic lost to Luxembourg's Gilles Müller in the opening round of Atlanta Open on 16 July.

In the first round of the US Open, Matosevic led Croatian 12th seed Marin Čilić by two sets to love before losing in five sets. In November Matosevic was voted the most improved player on the ATP Tour. In addition, Matosevic ended the year at World No. 49 and Australia's No. 1 player in singles.

=== 2013: Reaching the Top 40 ===
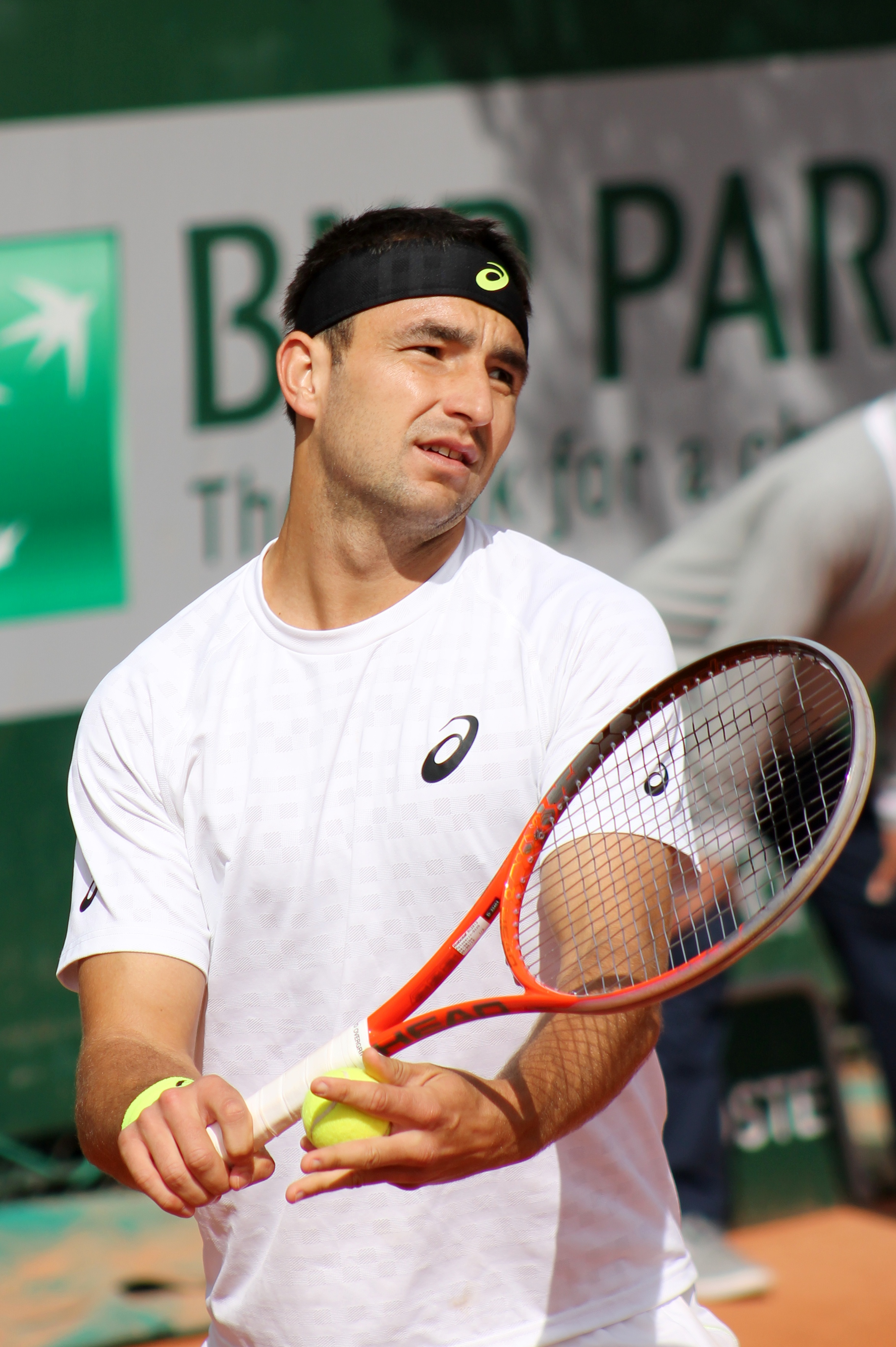
Serving at Roland Garros in 2013

Matosevic began 2013 poorly with first round losses at the Brisbane International to Kei Nishikori and the Apia International to Bernard Tomic, both matches losing in straight sets. Like the 2012 US Open, Matosevic was defeated by Marin Čilić in the first round of the 2013 Australian Open. Nonetheless, Matosevic rebounded, and reached the semi-finals of Memphis by defeating Go Soeda, and upsetting 4th seed Sam Querrey and 7th seed Alexandr Dolgopolov before he retired against Kei Nishikori. As a result, he entered the top 40 reaching a career-high of World No. 39 on 25 February 2013. Soeda got his revenge however, by ousting Matosevic in the first round of Delray Beach.

At the Monte Carlo Masters, Matosevic earned one of the biggest victories of his career, defeating former top ten player Fernando Verdasco in the first round. He lost to eight-time champion Rafael Nadal in the next round. Matosevic upset Milos Raonic in the round of 16 at the Citi Open. In the quarterfinals of the same event he fell in a third set tiebreak to Dmitry Tursunov.

=== 2014 ===
Matosevic's season began at the Brisbane International where he defeated Julien Benneteau and Sam Querrey. He was defeated by Roger Federer in the quarter-finals in straight sets. During the second set, he was treated briefly for his shoulder injury which has persisted since the end of last season. He reach the quarterfinals of the 2014 Apia International Sydney defeating Florian Mayer and Andreas Seppi on the route but lost to Sergiy Stakhovsky. At the Australian Open, Matosevic was defeated by Kei Nishikori in five sets. At the French Open, he reached the second round of a Grand Slam tournament for the first time in his thirteenth attempt, defeating Dustin Brown in four sets. It was his first ever win at a Major tournament, and his first ever win in a best-of-5 sets match. The following week, Matosevic made the final of the 2014 Aegon Trophy, but lost to Marcos Baghdatis. Matosevic won his second grand slam match by defeating the Spaniard Fernando Verdasco in four sets in the first round of Wimbledon. Matosevic made it to the quarterfinals of the BB&T Atlanta Open where he fell to John Isner. In the first round of the Western & Southern Open Matosevic beat Nicolas Mahut in two sets. On match point the chair umpire overruled a Matosevic ace, after Matosevic won the match on his second serve he verbally berated the chair umpire and spit on the court.

=== 2015 ===
After gaining a wild card into Brisbane ATP tournament Matosevic lost first round to American Steve Johnson. Following his first round exit from the Brisbane ATP tournament Marinko was invited to fill in for Matthew Ebden at the Hopman Cup in Perth.

At the Australian Open, Matosevic recorded his first victory at the event after five previous unsuccessful attempts, defeating Alexander Kudryavtsev in five sets in the opening round. He then faced former Wimbledon champion Andy Murray in the second round but lost in straight sets. Matosevic then played in Memphis but lost in the first round. His next tournament was at Delray Beach where he caused an upset over World number 20 and second seed John Isner in the first round. He then lost in the second round to Yoshihito Nishioka. After Delray Beach, he played in Acapulco where he defeated Marcel Granollers before losing to eventual champion David Ferrer. Following this was a string of first round losses at Indian Wells, Irving, Miami, Houston, Barcelona, Estoril, Geneva, French Open and Rosmalen. This continued at Wimbledon as Matosevic let a two-set lead slip before losing to Liam Broady. Matosevic ended the year with a ranking of No. 296.

=== 2016 ===
Matosevic reached the second round of qualifying for the 2016 Australian Open before heading to North America where he qualified for and reached the quarter-final of Dallas and Puebla challengers. In April, Matosevic headed to Asia and qualified for and reached the quarter-finals of Santaizi and Busan challengers before heading to the United Kingdom with limited success. In August and September, Matosevic has his best singles results reaching the semi-finals of Bangkok and Nanchang challengers before ending the season in October. Matosevic ended 2016 with a ranking of No. 221.

=== 2017 ===
Matosevic lost in the first round of qualifying for the 2017 Australian Open before playing on the Asian challenger circuit between February and May; failing to pass round 1 in any. From July to August Matosevic played in North America also unable to pass round 1. In September, Matosevic won his first challenger match for the year at Gwangju, ultimately reaching the quarter-final. In October, Matosevic reached the semi-final of OEC Kaohsiung as a lucky loser, before playing further Asian challenger events until November. Matosevic ended 2017 with a ranking of No. 377.

=== 2018 ===
Matosevic commenced the year qualifying for and reaching the quarter-final of the Playford Challenger. He lost in the first round of 2018 Australian Open men's singles qualifying. He has since played at the Burnie International, again being knocked out in the 1st round of qualifying. The Launceston International saw him progress to the round of 16, before being knocked out by Alexander Sarkissian. After a knockout in the round of 32 at the Morelos Open, Matosevic played the Oracle Challenger Series, being knocked out in the second round of qualifiers.

Matosevic retired from professional tennis in February and officially announced in November 2018.

== Coaching and ban ==
He became the head coach at a tennis academy in Bali in 2019.

He is the coach of fellow Australian Christopher O'Connell who under his guidance reached the third round of the 2022 Australian Open.

He is also coaching compatriot Jordan Thompson and was his coach when he reached the final at the 2023 Libéma Open for a second time and won his first title at the 2024 Los Cabos Open.

In March 2026, Matosevic was issued with a four-year ban by the International Tennis Integrity Agency for multiple anti-doping rule violations between 2018 and 2020 including blood doping and assisting other players how to blood dope and avoid positive tests.

== ATP career finals ==
=== Singles: 1 (1 runner-up) ===
| Legend Grand Slam Tournaments (0–0) ATP World Tour Finals (0–0) ATP Masters 1000 Series (0–0) ATP 500 Series (0–0) ATP 250 Series (0–1) | Finals by surface Hard (0–1) Clay (0–0) Grass (0–0) Carpet (0–0) | Finals by setting Outdoors (0–1) Indoors (0–0) |

| Result | W–L | Date | Tournament | Tier | Surface | Opponent | Score |
|---|---|---|---|---|---|---|---|
| Loss | 0–1 | Mar 2012 | Delray Beach, United States | 250 Series | Hard | (South Africa) Kevin Anderson | 4–6, 6–7^{(2–7)} |

=== Doubles: 1 (1 runner-up) ===
| Legend Grand Slam Tournaments (0–0) ATP World Tour Finals (0–0) ATP Masters 1000 Series (0–0) ATP 500 Series (0–0) ATP 250 Series (0–1) | Finals by surface Hard (0–1) Clay (0–0) Grass (0–0) Carpet (0–0) | Finals by setting Outdoors (0–0) Indoors (0–1) |

| Result | W–L | Date | Tournament | Tier | Surface | Partner | Opponents | Score |
|---|---|---|---|---|---|---|---|---|
| Loss | 0–1 | Feb 2013 | San Jose, United States | 250 Series | Hard | (Australia) Lleyton Hewitt | (Belgium) Xavier Malisse (Germany) Frank Moser | 0–6, 7–6^{(7–5)}, [4–10] |

== ATP Challenger and ITF Futures Finals ==
=== Singles: 16 (9–7) ===
| Legend ATP Challenger (4–3) ITF Futures (5–4) | Finals by surface Hard (8–4) Clay (0–2) Grass (1–1) Carpet (0–0) |

| Result | W–L | Date | Tournament | Tier | Surface | Opponent | Score |
|---|---|---|---|---|---|---|---|
| Loss | 0–1 | Sep 2007 | Indonesia F6, Denpasar | Futures | Hard | (Japan) Kento Takeuchi | 6–4, 4–6, 4–6 |
| Loss | 0–2 | May 2008 | Mexico F5, Guadalajara | Futures | Clay | (Mexico) Victor Romero | 4–6, 2–6 |
| Win | 1–2 | May 2008 | Mexico F7, Morelia | Futures | Hard | (Mexico) Miguel Gallardo-Valles | 6–3, 4–6, 6–3 |
| Win | 2–2 | May 2008 | Mexico F8, Puerto Vallarta | Futures | Hard | (United States) Nima Roshan | 6–3, 6–7^{(8–10)}, 6–3 |
| Loss | 2–3 | Sep 2008 | Australia F6, Kawana | Futures | Hard | (Australia) Colin Ebelthite | 4–6, 6–7^{(3–7)} |
| Loss | 2–4 | Oct 2008 | Australia F9, Sale | Futures | Clay | (Australia) Nick Lindahl | 4–6, 0–6 |
| Win | 3–4 | Oct 2008 | Australia F10, Happy Valley | Futures | Hard | (Australia) Greg Jones | 6–1, 7–6^{(7–3)} |
| Win | 4–4 | Dec 2008 | Australia F12, Sorrento | Futures | Hard | (Australia) Adam Feeney | 6–3, 7–6^{(7–4)} |
| Win | 5–4 | Feb 2009 | Australia F2, Berri | Futures | Grass | (Australia) Colin Ebelthite | 6–3, 6–4 |
| Loss | 5–5 | Mar 2009 | Melbourne, Australia | Challenger | Hard | (Australia) Bernard Tomic | 7–5, 4–6, 3–6 |
| Loss | 5–6 | Jun 2010 | Ojai, United States | Challenger | Hard | (United States) Bobby Reynolds | 6–3, 5–7, 5–7 |
| Win | 6–6 | Jul 2010 | Aptos, United States | Challenger | Hard | (United States) Donald Young | 6–4, 6–2 |
| Win | 7–6 | Oct 2010 | Calabasas, United States | Challenger | Hard | (United States) Ryan Sweeting | 2–6, 6–4, 6–3 |
| Win | 8–6 | Feb 2012 | Caloundra, Australia | Challenger | Hard | (Australia) Greg Jones | 6–0, 6–2 |
| Win | 9–6 | May 2012 | Athens, Greece | Challenger | Hard | (Belgium) Ruben Bemelmans | 6–3, 6–4 |
| Loss | 9–7 | Jun 2014 | Nottingham, United Kingdom | Challenger | Grass | (Cyprus) Marcos Baghdatis | 4–6, 3–6 |

=== Doubles: 5 (1–4) ===
| Legend ATP Challenger (1–1) ITF Futures (0–3) | Finals by surface Hard (1–3) Clay (0–1) Grass (0–0) Carpet (0–0) |

| Result | W–L | Date | Tournament | Tier | Surface | Partner | Opponents | Score |
|---|---|---|---|---|---|---|---|---|
| Loss | 0–1 | Aug 2007 | Indonesia F1, Makassar | Futures | Hard | (Australia) Sadik Kadir | (South Korea) Kwon Oh-Hee (South Korea) Lee Chul-Hee | 4–6, 3–6 |
| Loss | 0–2 | Oct 2007 | Australia F6, Sawtell | Futures | Clay | (Australia) Nick Lindahl | (Australia) Miles Armstrong (Australia) Strahinja Bobusic | walkover |
| Loss | 0–3 | May 2008 | Mexico F8, Puerto Vallarta | Futures | Hard | (Australia) Andrew Roberts | (United States) Mason Fuller (United States) Ikaika Jobe | 2–6, 1–6 |
| Loss | 0–4 | Feb 2011 | Burnie, Australia | Challenger | Hard | (New Zealand) Jose Statham | (Canada) Peter Polansky (Canada) Philip Bester | 4–6, 6–3, [12–14] |
| Win | 1–4 | Nov 2015 | Traralgon, Australia | Challenger | Hard | (Australia) Dayne Kelly | (Australia) Omar Jasika (Australia) Bradley Mousley | 7–5, 6–2 |

== Performance timelines ==
Key
| W | F | SF | QF | #R | RR | Q# | DNQ | A | NH |

(W) winner; (F) finalist; (SF) semifinalist; (QF) quarterfinalist; (#R) rounds 4, 3, 2, 1; (RR) round-robin stage; (Q#) qualification round; (DNQ) did not qualify; (A) absent; (NH) not held; (SR) strike rate (events won / competed); (W–L) win–loss record.

=== Singles ===
| Tournament | 2006 | 2007 | 2008 | 2009 | 2010 | 2011 | 2012 | 2013 | 2014 | 2015 | 2016 | 2017 | 2018 | SR | W–L | Win % |
|---|---|---|---|---|---|---|---|---|---|---|---|---|---|---|---|---|
Grand Slam tournaments
| Australian Open | A | A | A | Q1 | 1R | 1R | 1R | 1R | 1R | 2R | Q2 | Q1 | Q1 | 0 / 6 | 1–6 | 14% |
| French Open | A | A | A | Q2 | Q1 | Q2 | Q2 | 1R | 2R | 1R | A | A | A | 0 / 3 | 1–3 | 25% |
| Wimbledon | A | A | A | Q1 | Q2 | 1R | 1R | 1R | 2R | 1R | A | A | A | 0 / 5 | 1–5 | 17% |
| US Open | A | A | A | Q1 | Q2 | 1R | 1R | 1R | 1R | A | A | A | A | 0 / 4 | 0–4 | 0% |
| Win–loss | 0–0 | 0–0 | 0–0 | 0–0 | 0–1 | 0–3 | 0–3 | 0–4 | 2–4 | 1–3 | 0–0 | 0–0 | 0–0 | 0 / 18 | 3–18 | 14% |
ATP World Tour Masters 1000
| Indian Wells Masters | A | A | A | A | 2R | 1R | 2R | 3R | 2R | 1R | A | A | A | 0 / 6 | 5–6 | 45% |
| Miami Open | A | A | A | A | A | Q2 | 1R | 1R | 2R | 1R | A | A | A | 0 / 4 | 1–4 | 20% |
| Monte Carlo Masters | A | A | A | A | A | A | A | 2R | 1R | A | A | A | A | 0 / 2 | 1–2 | 33% |
| Madrid Open | A | A | A | A | A | A | A | 1R | 2R | A | A | A | A | 0 / 2 | 1–2 | 33% |
| Canadian Open | A | A | A | A | A | Q2 | Q1 | QF | Q2 | A | A | A | A | 0 / 1 | 3–1 | 75% |
| Cincinnati Masters | A | A | A | A | A | A | 1R | A | 2R | A | A | A | A | 0 / 2 | 1–2 | 33% |
| Shanghai Masters | Not Held | | | A | A | Q1 | 1R | A | Q1 | A | A | A | A | 0 / 1 | 0–1 | 0% |
| Paris Masters | A | A | A | A | A | A | Q1 | A | A | A | A | A | A | 0 / 0 | 0–0 | – |
| Win–loss | 0–0 | 0–0 | 0–0 | 0–0 | 1–1 | 0–1 | 1–4 | 6–5 | 4–5 | 0–2 | 0–0 | 0–0 | 0–0 | 0 / 18 | 12–18 | 40% |
National representation
| Davis Cup | A | A | A | A | A | Z1 | Z1 | Z1 | A | A | A | A | A | 0 / 0 | 2–2 | 50% |
Career statistics
| Titles / Finals | 0 / 0 | 0 / 0 | 0 / 0 | 0 / 0 | 0 / 0 | 0 / 0 | 0 / 1 | 0 / 0 | 0 / 0 | 0 / 0 | 0 / 0 | 0 / 0 | 0 / 0 | 0 / 1 | | |
| Overall win–loss | 0–0 | 0–0 | 0–0 | 0–0 | 1–3 | 2–10 | 17–19 | 18–25 | 22–22 | 3–16 | 0–0 | 0–0 | 0–0 | 63–95 | | |
| Year-end ranking | 616 | 610 | 294 | 186 | 138 | 203 | 49 | 61 | 75 | 296 | 221 | 377 | 410 | 40% | | |

=== Doubles ===
| Tournament | 2010 | 2011 | 2012 | 2013 | 2014 | 2015 | SR | W–L | Win % |
|---|---|---|---|---|---|---|---|---|---|
Grand Slam tournaments
| Australian Open | 1R | 1R | 2R | 1R | 1R | 1R | 0 / 6 | 1–6 | 14% |
| French Open | A | A | 1R | 1R | 2R | A | 0 / 3 | 1–3 | 25% |
| Wimbledon | A | A | A | 2R | 1R | A | 0 / 2 | 1–2 | 33% |
| US Open | A | A | 3R | 1R | A | A | 0 / 2 | 2–2 | 50% |
| Win–loss | 0–1 | 0–1 | 3–3 | 1–4 | 1–3 | 0–1 | 0 / 13 | 5–13 | 28% |

Awards
| Preceded by (United States) Alex Bogomolov, Jr. | ATP Most Improved Player; 2012 | Succeeded by (Spain) Pablo Carreño Busta |
