= 2009 ATP Challenger Tour =

Details
- Duration: 5 January 2009 – 6 December 2009
- Edition: 32nd (1st under this name)
- Tournaments: 163

Achievements (singles)

The ATP Challenger Tour is the secondary professional tennis circuit organized by the ATP. The 2009 ATP Challenger Tour calendar comprised 20 top tier Tretorn SERIE+ tournaments, and 142 regular series tournaments, with prize money ranging from $25,000 up to $150,000.

== Schedule ==
=== January ===
Week of	Tournament	Champions	Runners-up	Semifinalists	Quarterfinalists
January 5	2009 Prime Cup Aberto de São Paulo; São Paulo, Brazil; Regular series Hard – $100,000+H – 32S/32Q/16D; Single Draw – Doubles	(Brazil) Ricardo Mello; 6–2, 6–4	(Chile) Paul Capdeville	(Brazil) João Souza (Argentina) Horacio Zeballos	(Brazil) Franco Ferreiro (Argentina) Sebastián Decoud (Brazil) Thiago Alves (Brazil) Rogério Dutra Silva
January 5	2009 Prime Cup Aberto de São Paulo; São Paulo, Brazil; Regular series Hard – $100,000+H – 32S/32Q/16D; Single Draw – Doubles	(Argentina) Carlos Berlocq (Argentina) Leonardo Mayer; 7–6^{(7–1)}, 6–3	(Argentina) Mariano Hood (Argentina) Horacio Zeballos	(Brazil) João Souza (Argentina) Horacio Zeballos	(Brazil) Franco Ferreiro (Argentina) Sebastián Decoud (Brazil) Thiago Alves (Brazil) Rogério Dutra Silva
January 5	2009 Internationaux de Nouvelle-Calédonie; Nouméa, New Caledonia, France; Regular series Hard – $75,000+H – 32S/28Q/16D; Singles	(United States) Brendan Evans; 4–6, 6–3, 6–4	(Germany) Florian Mayer	(France) Mathieu Montcourt (United States) Ryan Sweeting	(Austria) Stefan Koubek (France) Jean-Christophe Faurel (Monaco) Jean-René Lisnard (United Kingdom) Alex Bogdanovic
January 5	2009 Internationaux de Nouvelle-Calédonie; Nouméa, New Caledonia, France; Regular series Hard – $75,000+H – 32S/28Q/16D; Singles	Play cancelled due to rain		(France) Mathieu Montcourt (United States) Ryan Sweeting	(Austria) Stefan Koubek (France) Jean-Christophe Faurel (Monaco) Jean-René Lisnard (United Kingdom) Alex Bogdanovic
January 12	2009 Abierto Internacional de Salinas; Salinas, Ecuador; Regular series Hard – $35,000+H – 32S/32Q/16D; Singles – Doubles	(Colombia) Santiago Giraldo; 6–3, 6–2	(United States) Michael Russell	(Argentina) Leonardo Mayer (Argentina) Carlos Berlocq	(Paraguay) Ramón Delgado (Germany) Benjamin Becker (Colombia) Alejandro Falla (South Africa) Izak van der Merwe
January 12	2009 Abierto Internacional de Salinas; Salinas, Ecuador; Regular series Hard – $35,000+H – 32S/32Q/16D; Singles – Doubles	(Thailand) Sanchai Ratiwatana (Thailand) Sonchat Ratiwatana; 6–3, 7–6^{(7–4)}	(Argentina) Juan Pablo Brzezicki (Peru) Iván Miranda	(Argentina) Leonardo Mayer (Argentina) Carlos Berlocq	(Paraguay) Ramón Delgado (Germany) Benjamin Becker (Colombia) Alejandro Falla (South Africa) Izak van der Merwe
January 19	2009 Challenger ATP Iquique; Iquique, Chile; Regular series Clay (red) – $35,000+H – 32S/17Q/16D; Singles – Doubles	(Argentina) Máximo González; 6–4, 6–4	(Chile) Guillermo Hormazábal	(Argentina) Juan Pablo Brzezicki (Brazil) Ricardo Hocevar	(Argentina) Horacio Zeballos (Argentina) Gastón Gaudio (Serbia) Boris Pašanski (Brazil) João Souza
January 19	2009 Challenger ATP Iquique; Iquique, Chile; Regular series Clay (red) – $35,000+H – 32S/17Q/16D; Singles – Doubles	(Sweden) Johan Brunström (Netherlands Antilles) Jean-Julien Rojer; 6–3, 6–4	(Uruguay) Pablo Cuevas (Argentina) Horacio Zeballos	(Argentina) Juan Pablo Brzezicki (Brazil) Ricardo Hocevar	(Argentina) Horacio Zeballos (Argentina) Gastón Gaudio (Serbia) Boris Pašanski (Brazil) João Souza
January 26	2009 Intersport Heilbronn Open; Talheim, Germany; Tretorn SERIE+ Carpet (i) – €85,000+H – 32S/32Q/16D; Singles – Doubles	(Germany) Benjamin Becker; 6–4, 6–4	(Slovakia) Karol Beck	(Germany) Michael Berrer (Germany) Florian Mayer	(France) Arnaud Clément (Belgium) Olivier Rochus (Ukraine) Sergiy Stakhovsky (France) Adrian Mannarino
January 26	2009 Intersport Heilbronn Open; Talheim, Germany; Tretorn SERIE+ Carpet (i) – €85,000+H – 32S/32Q/16D; Singles – Doubles	(Slovakia) Karol Beck (Czech Republic) Jaroslav Levinský; 6–3, 6–2	(Germany) Benedikt Dorsch (Germany) Philipp Petzschner	(Germany) Michael Berrer (Germany) Florian Mayer	(France) Arnaud Clément (Belgium) Olivier Rochus (Ukraine) Sergiy Stakhovsky (France) Adrian Mannarino
January 26	2009 Home Depot Center USTA Challenger; Carson, United States; Regular series Hard – $50,000 – 32S/32Q/16D/4Q; Singles – Doubles	(United States) Wayne Odesnik; 6–4, 6–4	(United States) Scoville Jenkins	(United States) Vince Spadea (United States) Kevin Kim	(United States) Donald Young (United States) Jesse Levine (Philippines) Cecil Mamiit (Paraguay) Ramón Delgado
January 26	2009 Home Depot Center USTA Challenger; Carson, United States; Regular series Hard – $50,000 – 32S/32Q/16D/4Q; Singles – Doubles	(United States) Scott Lipsky (United States) David Martin; 7–6^{(7–3)}, 4–6, [10–6]	(United States) Lester Cook (United States) Donald Young	(United States) Vince Spadea (United States) Kevin Kim	(United States) Donald Young (United States) Jesse Levine (Philippines) Cecil Mamiit (Paraguay) Ramón Delgado
January 26	2009 Seguros Bolívar Open Bucaramanga; Bucaramanga, Colombia; Regular series Clay (red) – $35,000+H – 32S/32Q/16D; Singles – Doubles	(Argentina) Horacio Zeballos; 7–5, 6–2	(Colombia) Carlos Salamanca	(Spain) Miguel Ángel López Jaén (Poland) Grzegorz Panfil	(Dominican Republic) Víctor Estrella Burgos (Italy) Alessio di Mauro (Brazil) João Souza (Serbia) Filip Krajinović
January 26	2009 Seguros Bolívar Open Bucaramanga; Bucaramanga, Colombia; Regular series Clay (red) – $35,000+H – 32S/32Q/16D; Singles – Doubles	(Argentina) Diego Álvarez (Spain) Carles Poch Gradin; 7–6^{(9–7)}, 6–1	(Ecuador) Carlos Avellán (Brazil) Eric Gomes	(Spain) Miguel Ángel López Jaén (Poland) Grzegorz Panfil	(Dominican Republic) Víctor Estrella Burgos (Italy) Alessio di Mauro (Brazil) João Souza (Serbia) Filip Krajinović

=== February ===
Week of	Tournament	Champions	Runners-up	Semifinalists	Quarterfinalists
February 2	2009 KGHM Dialog Polish Indoors; Wrocław, Poland; Tretorn SERIE+ Hard (i) – €106,500+H – 32S/24Q/16D; Singles – Doubles	(Germany) Michael Berrer; 6–3, 6–4	(Russia) Alexander Kudryavtsev	(Czech Republic) Robin Vik (Slovakia) Karol Beck	(Germany) Daniel Brands (Colombia) Santiago Giraldo (France) Édouard Roger-Vasselin (United States) Sam Warburg
February 2	2009 KGHM Dialog Polish Indoors; Wrocław, Poland; Tretorn SERIE+ Hard (i) – €106,500+H – 32S/24Q/16D; Singles – Doubles	(Thailand) Sanchai Ratiwatana (Thailand) Sonchat Ratiwatana; 6–4, 3–6, [10–8]	(Germany) Benedikt Dorsch (United States) Sam Warburg	(Czech Republic) Robin Vik (Slovakia) Karol Beck	(Germany) Daniel Brands (Colombia) Santiago Giraldo (France) Édouard Roger-Vasselin (United States) Sam Warburg
February 2	2009 McDonald's Burnie International; Burnie, Australia; Regular series Hard – $50,000 – 32S/28Q/16D; Singles – Doubles	(Australia) Brydan Klein; 6–3, 6–3	(Slovenia) Grega Žemlja	(Australia) Peter Luczak (Australia) John Millman	(Australia) Bernard Tomic (Japan) Tasuku Iwami (South Korea) Im Kyu-tae (Australia) Greg Jones
February 2	2009 McDonald's Burnie International; Burnie, Australia; Regular series Hard – $50,000 – 32S/28Q/16D; Singles – Doubles	(Australia) Miles Armstrong (Australia) Sadik Kadir; 6–3, 3–6, [10–7]	(Australia) Peter Luczak (Australia) Robert Smeets	(Australia) Peter Luczak (Australia) John Millman	(Australia) Bernard Tomic (Japan) Tasuku Iwami (South Korea) Im Kyu-tae (Australia) Greg Jones
February 2	2009 Challenger of Dallas; Dallas, United States; Regular series Hard (i) – $50,000 – 32S/32Q/16D/4Q; Singles – Doubles	(United States) Ryan Sweeting; 6–4, 6–3	(United States) Brendan Evans	(United States) Rajeev Ram (India) Prakash Amritraj	(United States) Kevin Kim (United States) Michael Russell (United States) Scoville Jenkins (United States) Amer Delić
February 2	2009 Challenger of Dallas; Dallas, United States; Regular series Hard (i) – $50,000 – 32S/32Q/16D/4Q; Singles – Doubles	(India) Prakash Amritraj (United States) Rajeev Ram; 6–3, 4–6, [10–8]	(United States) Patrick Briaud (United States) Jason Marshall	(United States) Rajeev Ram (India) Prakash Amritraj	(United States) Kevin Kim (United States) Michael Russell (United States) Scoville Jenkins (United States) Amer Delić
February 9	No events that week.				
February 16	2009 MT:S Open p/b Sony Ericsson; Belgrade, Serbia; Tretorn SERIE+ Hard (i) – €106,500+H – 32S/32Q/16D; Singles – Doubles	(Serbia) Viktor Troicki; 6–4, 6–2	(Slovakia) Dominik Hrbatý	(Belgium) Olivier Rochus (Germany) Benedikt Dorsch	(Germany) Daniel Brands (Slovakia) Karol Beck (France) Josselin Ouanna (United States) Sam Warburg
February 16	2009 MT:S Open p/b Sony Ericsson; Belgrade, Serbia; Tretorn SERIE+ Hard (i) – €106,500+H – 32S/32Q/16D; Singles – Doubles	(Germany) Michael Kohlmann (Germany) Philipp Marx; 3–6, 6–2, [10–8]	(Pakistan) Aisam-ul-Haq Qureshi (Croatia) Lovro Zovko	(Belgium) Olivier Rochus (Germany) Benedikt Dorsch	(Germany) Daniel Brands (Slovakia) Karol Beck (France) Josselin Ouanna (United States) Sam Warburg
February 16	2009 Morocco Tennis Tour – Tanger; Tanger, Morocco; Regular series Clay (red) – €30,000+H – 32S/32Q/16D; Singles – Doubles	(Spain) Marc López; 5–7, 6–4, 7–6(9)	(Spain) Pere Riba	(Italy) Alberto Brizzi (Argentina) Leandro Migani	(Romania) Gabriel Moraru (Algeria) Lamine Ouahab (Australia) Peter Luczak (Tunisia) Malek Jaziri
February 16	2009 Morocco Tennis Tour – Tanger; Tanger, Morocco; Regular series Clay (red) – €30,000+H – 32S/32Q/16D; Singles – Doubles	(France) Augustin Gensse (France) Éric Prodon; 6–1, 7–6(3)	(Italy) Giancarlo Petrazzuolo (Italy) Simone Vagnozzi	(Italy) Alberto Brizzi (Argentina) Leandro Migani	(Romania) Gabriel Moraru (Algeria) Lamine Ouahab (Australia) Peter Luczak (Tunisia) Malek Jaziri
February 23	2009 Open de Franche-Comté; Besançon, France; Regular series Hard (i) – €106,500+H – 32S/28Q/16D; Singles – Doubles	(Belgium) Kristof Vliegen; 6–2, 6–7(6), 6–3	(Germany) Andreas Beck	(Kazakhstan) Mikhail Kukushkin (France) Josselin Ouanna	(Switzerland) Stéphane Bohli (Germany) Michael Berrer (France) Édouard Roger-Vasselin (France) Alexandre Sidorenko
February 23	2009 Open de Franche-Comté; Besançon, France; Regular series Hard (i) – €106,500+H – 32S/28Q/16D; Singles – Doubles	(Slovakia) Karol Beck (Czech Republic) Jaroslav Levinský; 2–6, 7–5, [10–7]	(Czech Republic) David Škoch (Slovakia) Igor Zelenay	(Kazakhstan) Mikhail Kukushkin (France) Josselin Ouanna	(Switzerland) Stéphane Bohli (Germany) Michael Berrer (France) Édouard Roger-Vasselin (France) Alexandre Sidorenko
February 23	2009 Maccabi Men's Challenger; Melbourne, Australia; Regular series Hard – $50,000 – 32S/32Q/16D; Singles – Doubles	(Australia) Bernard Tomic; 5–7, 6–4, 6–3	(Australia) Marinko Matosevic	(Australia) Brydan Klein (Australia) Colin Ebelthite	(Japan) Junn Mitsuhashi (Slovakia) Ivo Klec (Australia) Nick Lindahl (Thailand) Danai Udomchoke
February 23	2009 Maccabi Men's Challenger; Melbourne, Australia; Regular series Hard – $50,000 – 32S/32Q/16D; Singles – Doubles	(Thailand) Sanchai Ratiwatana (Thailand) Sonchat Ratiwatana; 7–6(5), 5–7, [10–7]	(Chinese Taipei) Chen Ti (Thailand) Danai Udomchoke	(Australia) Brydan Klein (Australia) Colin Ebelthite	(Japan) Junn Mitsuhashi (Slovakia) Ivo Klec (Australia) Nick Lindahl (Thailand) Danai Udomchoke
February 23	2009 Morocco Tennis Tour – Meknes; Meknes, Morocco; Regular series Clay (red) – €30,000+H – 32S/29Q/16D; Singles – Doubles	(Portugal) Rui Machado; 6–2, 6–7(6), 6–3	(Spain) David Marrero	(Algeria) Lamine Ouahab (Australia) Peter Luczak	(Czech Republic) Jiří Vaněk (Spain) Fernando Vicente (Italy) Alessio di Mauro (Slovakia) Pavol Červenák
February 23	2009 Morocco Tennis Tour – Meknes; Meknes, Morocco; Regular series Clay (red) – €30,000+H – 32S/29Q/16D; Singles – Doubles	(Spain) Marc López (Algeria) Lamine Ouahab; 6–3, 7–5	(Italy) Alessio di Mauro (Italy) Giancarlo Petrazzuolo	(Algeria) Lamine Ouahab (Australia) Peter Luczak	(Czech Republic) Jiří Vaněk (Spain) Fernando Vicente (Italy) Alessio di Mauro (Slovakia) Pavol Červenák
February 23	2009 Volkswagen Challenger; Wolfsburg, Germany; Regular series Carpet (i) – €30,000+H – 32S/32Q/16D; Singles – Doubles	(Belgium) Ruben Bemelmans; 7–6(5), 3–6, 6–3	(Italy) Stefano Galvani	(Netherlands) Michel Koning (Czech Republic) Lukáš Rosol	(Germany) Matthias Bachinger (United Kingdom) Alex Bogdanovic (Slovakia) Dominik Hrbatý (Germany) Florian Mayer
February 23	2009 Volkswagen Challenger; Wolfsburg, Germany; Regular series Carpet (i) – €30,000+H – 32S/32Q/16D; Singles – Doubles	(United States) Travis Rettenmaier (United Kingdom) Ken Skupski; 6–3, 6–4	(Ukraine) Sergei Bubka (Russia) Alexander Kudryavtsev	(Netherlands) Michel Koning (Czech Republic) Lukáš Rosol	(Germany) Matthias Bachinger (United Kingdom) Alex Bogdanovic (Slovakia) Dominik Hrbatý (Germany) Florian Mayer

=== March ===
Week of	Tournament	Champions	Runners-up	Semifinalists	Quarterfinalists
March 2	2009 Internazionali di Tennis di Bergamo; Bergamo, Italy; Tretorn SERIE+ Hard (i) – €106,500+H – 32S/24Q/16D; Singles – Doubles	(Czech Republic) Lukáš Rosol; 6–1, 4–6, 7–6(3)	(Germany) Benedikt Dorsch	(Kazakhstan) Mikhail Kukushkin (Germany) Björn Phau	(France) Fabrice Santoro (Italy) Marco Crugnola (Czech Republic) Pavel Šnobel (Russia) Alexander Kudryavtsev
March 2	2009 Internazionali di Tennis di Bergamo; Bergamo, Italy; Tretorn SERIE+ Hard (i) – €106,500+H – 32S/24Q/16D; Singles – Doubles	(Slovakia) Karol Beck (Czech Republic) Jaroslav Levinský; 7–6(6), 6–4	(South Africa) Chris Haggard (Czech Republic) Pavel Vízner	(Kazakhstan) Mikhail Kukushkin (Germany) Björn Phau	(France) Fabrice Santoro (Italy) Marco Crugnola (Czech Republic) Pavel Šnobel (Russia) Alexander Kudryavtsev
March 2	2009 Challenger DCNS de Cherbourg; Cherbourg, France; Regular series Hard (i) – €42,500+H – 32S/32Q/16D; Singles – Doubles	(France) Arnaud Clément; 6–2, 6–4	(France) Thierry Ascione	(France) Édouard Roger-Vasselin (France) Adrian Mannarino	(Germany) Dominik Meffert (France) Nicolas Mahut (France) Romain Jouan (Switzerland) George Bastl
March 2	2009 Challenger DCNS de Cherbourg; Cherbourg, France; Regular series Hard (i) – €42,500+H – 32S/32Q/16D; Singles – Doubles	(France) Arnaud Clément (France) Édouard Roger-Vasselin; 4–6, 6–2, [10–3]	(Austria) Martin Fischer (Austria) Martin Slanar	(France) Édouard Roger-Vasselin (France) Adrian Mannarino	(Germany) Dominik Meffert (France) Nicolas Mahut (France) Romain Jouan (Switzerland) George Bastl
March 9	2009 Morocco Tennis Tour – Rabat; Rabat, Morocco; Regular series Clay (red) – €42,500+H – 32S/29Q/16D; Singles – Doubles	(France) Laurent Recouderc; 6–0, 6–2	(Spain) Santiago Ventura	(Peru) Iván Miranda (Romania) Victor Crivoi	(Spain) Daniel Muñoz de la Nava (Spain) David Marrero (Spain) Rubén Ramírez Hidalgo (Algeria) Lamine Ouahab
March 9	2009 Morocco Tennis Tour – Rabat; Rabat, Morocco; Regular series Clay (red) – €42,500+H – 32S/29Q/16D; Singles – Doubles	(Spain) Rubén Ramírez Hidalgo (Spain) Santiago Ventura; 6–4, 7–6(5)	(Germany) Michael Kohlmann (Germany) Philipp Marx	(Peru) Iván Miranda (Romania) Victor Crivoi	(Spain) Daniel Muñoz de la Nava (Spain) David Marrero (Spain) Rubén Ramírez Hidalgo (Algeria) Lamine Ouahab
March 9	2009 Japan Indoor Tennis Championships; Kyoto, Japan; Regular series Carpet (i) – $35,000+H – 32S/28Q/16D/3Q; Singles – Doubles	(Ukraine) Sergei Bubka; 7–6(6), 6–4	(Japan) Takao Suzuki	(Croatia) Ivan Dodig (Japan) Tatsuma Ito	(Japan) Hiroki Moriya (Germany) Matthias Bachinger (Japan) Junn Mitsuhashi (Japan) Toshihide Matsui
March 9	2009 Japan Indoor Tennis Championships; Kyoto, Japan; Regular series Carpet (i) – $35,000+H – 32S/28Q/16D/3Q; Singles – Doubles	(Pakistan) Aisam-ul-Haq Qureshi (Austria) Martin Slanar; 6–7(7), 7–6(3), [10–6]	(Japan) Tatsuma Ito (Japan) Takao Suzuki	(Croatia) Ivan Dodig (Japan) Tatsuma Ito	(Japan) Hiroki Moriya (Germany) Matthias Bachinger (Japan) Junn Mitsuhashi (Japan) Toshihide Matsui
March 9	2009 Challenger de Providencia; Santiago, Chile; Regular series Clay (red) – $35,000+H – 32S/29Q/15D; Singles – Doubles	(Argentina) Máximo González; 6–4, 6–3	(Argentina) Mariano Zabaleta	(Brazil) Caio Zampieri (Brazil) Franco Ferreiro	(Chile) Jorge Aguilar (Brazil) Júlio Silva (Argentina) Sergio Roitman (Argentina) Diego Álvarez
March 9	2009 Challenger de Providencia; Santiago, Chile; Regular series Clay (red) – $35,000+H – 32S/29Q/15D; Singles – Doubles	(Argentina) Sebastián Prieto (Argentina) Horacio Zeballos; 7–6(2), 6–2	(Brazil) Rogério Dutra Silva (Brazil) Flávio Saretta	(Brazil) Caio Zampieri (Brazil) Franco Ferreiro	(Chile) Jorge Aguilar (Brazil) Júlio Silva (Argentina) Sergio Roitman (Argentina) Diego Álvarez
March 16	2009 BMW Tennis Championship; Sunrise, United States; Regular series Hard – $125,000+H – 32S/32Q/16D; Singles – Doubles	(Sweden) Robin Söderling; 6–1, 6–1	(Czech Republic) Tomáš Berdych	(Serbia) Janko Tipsarević (Spain) Feliciano López	(France) Arnaud Clément (Russia) Teymuraz Gabashvili (Germany) Mischa Zverev (Germany) Rainer Schüttler
March 16	2009 BMW Tennis Championship; Sunrise, United States; Regular series Hard – $125,000+H – 32S/32Q/16D; Singles – Doubles	(United States) Eric Butorac (United States) Bobby Reynolds; 5–7, 6–4, [10–4]	(South Africa) Jeff Coetzee (Australia) Jordan Kerr	(Serbia) Janko Tipsarević (Spain) Feliciano López	(France) Arnaud Clément (Russia) Teymuraz Gabashvili (Germany) Mischa Zverev (Germany) Rainer Schüttler
March 16	2009 Bancolombia Open; Bogotá, Colombia; Regular series Clay (red) – $125,000+H – 32S/27Q/16D; Singles – Doubles	(Argentina) Horacio Zeballos; 7–6(3), 6–0	(Mexico) Santiago González	(Brazil) Franco Ferreiro (Ecuador) Giovanni Lapentti	(Argentina) Mariano Puerta (Argentina) Diego Álvarez (Brazil) Ricardo Mello (Brazil) Ricardo Hocevar
March 16	2009 Bancolombia Open; Bogotá, Colombia; Regular series Clay (red) – $125,000+H – 32S/27Q/16D; Singles – Doubles	(Argentina) Sebastián Prieto (Argentina) Horacio Zeballos; 4–6, 6–1, [11–9]	(Austria) Alexander Peya (Spain) Fernando Vicente	(Brazil) Franco Ferreiro (Ecuador) Giovanni Lapentti	(Argentina) Mariano Puerta (Argentina) Diego Álvarez (Brazil) Ricardo Mello (Brazil) Ricardo Hocevar
March 16	2009 Morocco Tennis Tour – Marrakech; Marrakesh, Morocco; Regular series Clay (red) – €106,500+H – 32S/27Q/16D; Singles – Doubles	(Brazil) Marcos Daniel; 4–6, 7–5, 6–2	(Algeria) Lamine Ouahab	(Czech Republic) Ivo Minář (France) Alexandre Sidorenko	(Portugal) Rui Machado (Spain) Pablo Andújar (Morocco) Rabie Chaki (Spain) Santiago Ventura
March 16	2009 Morocco Tennis Tour – Marrakech; Marrakesh, Morocco; Regular series Clay (red) – €106,500+H – 32S/27Q/16D; Singles – Doubles	(Spain) Rubén Ramírez Hidalgo (Spain) Santiago Ventura; 6–3, 7–6(5)	(Spain) Alberto Martín (Spain) Daniel Muñoz de la Nava	(Czech Republic) Ivo Minář (France) Alexandre Sidorenko	(Portugal) Rui Machado (Spain) Pablo Andújar (Morocco) Rabie Chaki (Spain) Santiago Ventura
March 16	2009 SAT Bangkok Open; Bangkok, Thailand; Regular series Hard – $50,000 – 32S/32Q/16D; Singles – Doubles	(Germany) Florian Mayer; 7–5, 6–2	(Thailand) Danai Udomchoke	(Israel) Noam Okun (South Korea) Im Kyu-tae	(Germany) Andreas Beck (Italy) Paolo Lorenzi (Japan) Go Soeda (Turkey) Marsel İlhan
March 16	2009 SAT Bangkok Open; Bangkok, Thailand; Regular series Hard – $50,000 – 32S/32Q/16D; Singles – Doubles	(United Kingdom) Josh Goodall (Australia) Joseph Sirianni; 6–3, 6–1	(Russia) Mikhail Elgin (Russia) Alexander Kudryavtsev	(Israel) Noam Okun (South Korea) Im Kyu-tae	(Germany) Andreas Beck (Italy) Paolo Lorenzi (Japan) Go Soeda (Turkey) Marsel İlhan
March 16	2009 Città di Caltanissetta; Caltanissetta, Italy; Regular series Clay (red) – €30,000+H – 32S/30Q/16D; Singles – Doubles	(Netherlands) Jesse Huta Galung; 6–2, 6–3	(Netherlands) Thiemo de Bakker	(Spain) David Marrero (Belgium) Xavier Malisse	(Belgium) Niels Desein (Argentina) Juan Pablo Brzezicki (Peru) Iván Miranda (Italy) Stefano Galvani
March 16	2009 Città di Caltanissetta; Caltanissetta, Italy; Regular series Clay (red) – €30,000+H – 32S/30Q/16D; Singles – Doubles	(Argentina) Juan Pablo Brzezicki (Spain) David Marrero; 7–6(5), 6–3	(Italy) Daniele Bracciali (Italy) Simone Vagnozzi	(Spain) David Marrero (Belgium) Xavier Malisse	(Belgium) Niels Desein (Argentina) Juan Pablo Brzezicki (Peru) Iván Miranda (Italy) Stefano Galvani
March 23	2009 SAT Khorat Open; Khorat, Thailand; Regular series Hard – $50,000 – 32S/22Q/16D; Singles – Doubles	(Germany) Andreas Beck; 7–5, 6–3	(Sweden) Filip Prpic	(United States) Rajeev Ram (Turkey) Marsel İlhan	(Italy) Paolo Lorenzi (Israel) Noam Okun (South Africa) Izak van der Merwe (Japan) Go Soeda
March 23	2009 SAT Khorat Open; Khorat, Thailand; Regular series Hard – $50,000 – 32S/22Q/16D; Singles – Doubles	(India) Rohan Bopanna (Pakistan) Aisam-ul-Haq Qureshi; 6–3, 6–7(5), [10–5]	(Thailand) Sanchai Ratiwatana (Thailand) Sonchat Ratiwatana	(United States) Rajeev Ram (Turkey) Marsel İlhan	(Italy) Paolo Lorenzi (Israel) Noam Okun (South Africa) Izak van der Merwe (Japan) Go Soeda
March 23	2009 Open Barletta – Città della Disfida; Barletta, Italy; Regular series Clay (red) – €42,500+H – 32S/31Q/16D; Singles – Doubles	(Czech Republic) Ivo Minář; 6–4, 6–3	(Spain) Santiago Ventura	(Spain) David Marrero (Uzbekistan) Denis Istomin	(Peru) Luis Horna (Italy) Alessio di Mauro (Spain) Rubén Ramírez Hidalgo (Kazakhstan) Yuri Schukin
March 23	2009 Open Barletta – Città della Disfida; Barletta, Italy; Regular series Clay (red) – €42,500+H – 32S/31Q/16D; Singles – Doubles	(Spain) Rubén Ramírez Hidalgo (Spain) Santiago Ventura; 7–6(1), 6–2	(Uruguay) Pablo Cuevas (Peru) Luis Horna	(Spain) David Marrero (Uzbekistan) Denis Istomin	(Peru) Luis Horna (Italy) Alessio di Mauro (Spain) Rubén Ramírez Hidalgo (Kazakhstan) Yuri Schukin
March 23	2009 The Caversham International; Jersey, Channel Islands; Regular series Hard (i) – €42,500 – 32S/22Q/16D; Singles – Doubles	(United Kingdom) Dan Evans; 6–3, 6–2	(Czech Republic) Jan Minář	(France) Sébastien de Chaunac (United Kingdom) Alex Bogdanovic	(France) Adrian Mannarino (Italy) Andrea Stoppini (United Kingdom) Daniel Cox (France) Stéphane Robert
March 23	2009 The Caversham International; Jersey, Channel Islands; Regular series Hard (i) – €42,500 – 32S/22Q/16D; Singles – Doubles	(United States) Eric Butorac (United States) Travis Rettenmaier; 6–4, 6–3	(United Kingdom) Colin Fleming (United Kingdom) Ken Skupski	(France) Sébastien de Chaunac (United Kingdom) Alex Bogdanovic	(France) Adrian Mannarino (Italy) Andrea Stoppini (United Kingdom) Daniel Cox (France) Stéphane Robert
March 23	2009 BH Telecom Indoors; Sarajevo, Bosnia and Herzegovina; Regular series Hard (i) – €30,000+H – 32S/22Q/16D; Singles – Doubles	(Croatia) Ivan Dodig; 6–4, 6–3	(Germany) Dominik Meffert	(France) Gary Lugassy (Austria) Andreas Haider-Maurer	(Slovakia) Lukáš Lacko (Russia) Konstantin Kravchuk (Slovenia) Blaž Kavčič (Bosnia and Herzegovina) Ismar Gorčić
March 23	2009 BH Telecom Indoors; Sarajevo, Bosnia and Herzegovina; Regular series Hard (i) – €30,000+H – 32S/22Q/16D; Singles – Doubles	(Russia) Konstantin Kravchuk (Poland) Dawid Olejniczak; 6–2, 3–6, [10–7]	(United Kingdom) James Auckland (Netherlands) Rogier Wassen	(France) Gary Lugassy (Austria) Andreas Haider-Maurer	(Slovakia) Lukáš Lacko (Russia) Konstantin Kravchuk (Slovenia) Blaž Kavčič (Bosnia and Herzegovina) Ismar Gorčić
March 30	2009 Tennis Napoli Cup; Naples, Italy; Regular series Clay (red) – €85,000+H – 32S/32Q/16D; Singles – Doubles	(Uruguay) Pablo Cuevas; 6–1, 6–3	(Romania) Victor Crivoi	(Italy) Fabio Fognini (Spain) Pablo Andújar	(Kazakhstan) Andrey Golubev (Brazil) Marcos Daniel (Argentina) Federico Delbonis (Spain) Santiago Ventura
March 30	2009 Tennis Napoli Cup; Naples, Italy; Regular series Clay (red) – €85,000+H – 32S/32Q/16D; Singles – Doubles	(Uruguay) Pablo Cuevas (Spain) David Marrero; 6–4, 6–3	(Czech Republic) Lukáš Rosol (Germany) Frank Moser	(Italy) Fabio Fognini (Spain) Pablo Andújar	(Kazakhstan) Andrey Golubev (Brazil) Marcos Daniel (Argentina) Federico Delbonis (Spain) Santiago Ventura
March 30	2009 Open Prévadiès; Saint-Brieuc, France; Regular series Clay (red) (i) – €30,000+H – 32S/20Q/13D; Singles – Doubles	(France) Josselin Ouanna; 7–5, 1–6, 6–4	(France) Adrian Mannarino	(Kazakhstan) Yuri Schukin (Italy) Andrea Stoppini	(Slovenia) Grega Žemlja (Monaco) Jean-René Lisnard (France) Thierry Ascione (Argentina) Juan Pablo Brzezicki
March 30	2009 Open Prévadiès; Saint-Brieuc, France; Regular series Clay (red) (i) – €30,000+H – 32S/20Q/13D; Singles – Doubles	(United States) David Martin (Germany) Simon Stadler; 6–3, 6–2	(Australia) Peter Luczak (Australia) Joseph Sirianni	(Kazakhstan) Yuri Schukin (Italy) Andrea Stoppini	(Slovenia) Grega Žemlja (Monaco) Jean-René Lisnard (France) Thierry Ascione (Argentina) Juan Pablo Brzezicki

=== April ===
Week of	Tournament	Champions	Runners-up	Semifinalists	Quarterfinalists
April 6	2009 Status Athens Open; Athens, Greece; Regular series Hard – €85,000+H – 32S/32Q/16D; Singles – Doubles	(Portugal) Rui Machado; 6–3, 7–6(4)	(Spain) Daniel Muñoz de la Nava	(Czech Republic) Jan Hájek (Germany) Daniel Brands	(Slovakia) Dominik Hrbatý (France) Alexandre Sidorenko (Greece) Konstantinos Economidis (Uzbekistan) Denis Istomin
April 6	2009 Status Athens Open; Athens, Greece; Regular series Hard – €85,000+H – 32S/32Q/16D; Singles – Doubles	(Australia) Rameez Junaid (Germany) Philipp Marx; 6–4, 6–3	(Netherlands) Jesse Huta Galung (Portugal) Rui Machado	(Czech Republic) Jan Hájek (Germany) Daniel Brands	(Slovakia) Dominik Hrbatý (France) Alexandre Sidorenko (Greece) Konstantinos Economidis (Uzbekistan) Denis Istomin
April 6	2009 Price LeBlanc Lexus Pro Tennis Classic; Baton Rouge, United States; Regular series Hard – $50,000 – 32S/21Q/16D/4D; Singles – Doubles	(Germany) Benjamin Becker; 6–2, 3–6, 6–4	(United States) Rajeev Ram	(Australia) Sam Groth (Australia) Marinko Matosevic	(United States) Lester Cook (Republic of Ireland) Conor Niland (Germany) Benedikt Dorsch (Germany) Matthias Bachinger
April 6	2009 Price LeBlanc Lexus Pro Tennis Classic; Baton Rouge, United States; Regular series Hard – $50,000 – 32S/21Q/16D/4D; Singles – Doubles	(United States) Rajeev Ram (United States) Bobby Reynolds; 6–3, 6–7(6), [10–3]	(India) Harsh Mankad (United States) Scott Oudsema	(Australia) Sam Groth (Australia) Marinko Matosevic	(United States) Lester Cook (Republic of Ireland) Conor Niland (Germany) Benedikt Dorsch (Germany) Matthias Bachinger
April 6	2009 San Luis Potosí Challenger; San Luis Potosí, Mexico; Regular series Clay (red) – $35,000+H – 32S/32Q/16D; Singles – Doubles	(Colombia) Santiago Giraldo; 6–2, 6–7(3), 6–2	(Italy) Paolo Lorenzi	(Mexico) Santiago González (Argentina) Mariano Puerta	(Argentina) Horacio Zeballos (Brazil) Franco Ferreiro (Dominican Republic) Víctor Estrella Burgos (Austria) Rainer Eitzinger
April 6	2009 San Luis Potosí Challenger; San Luis Potosí, Mexico; Regular series Clay (red) – $35,000+H – 32S/32Q/16D; Singles – Doubles	(Mexico) Santiago González (Argentina) Horacio Zeballos; 6–2, 7–6(5)	(Brazil) Franco Ferreiro (Brazil) Júlio Silva	(Mexico) Santiago González (Argentina) Mariano Puerta	(Argentina) Horacio Zeballos (Brazil) Franco Ferreiro (Dominican Republic) Víctor Estrella Burgos (Austria) Rainer Eitzinger
April 6	2009 Mitsubishi Electric Europe Cup; Monza, Italy; Regular series Clay (red) – €30,000+H – 32S/32Q/16D; Singles – Doubles	(Spain) David Marrero; 5–7, 6–4, 6–4	(Croatia) Antonio Veić	(Italy) Alessio di Mauro (Monaco) Jean-René Lisnard	(Germany) Alexander Flock (Germany) Julian Reister (Spain) Albert Ramos Viñolas (France) Adrian Mannarino
April 6	2009 Mitsubishi Electric Europe Cup; Monza, Italy; Regular series Clay (red) – €30,000+H – 32S/32Q/16D; Singles – Doubles	(United Kingdom) James Auckland (United States) Travis Rettenmaier; 7–5, 6–7(6), [10–4]	(Czech Republic) Dušan Karol (Czech Republic) Jaroslav Pospíšil	(Italy) Alessio di Mauro (Monaco) Jean-René Lisnard	(Germany) Alexander Flock (Germany) Julian Reister (Spain) Albert Ramos Viñolas (France) Adrian Mannarino
April 13	2009 Soweto Open; Johannesburg, South Africa; Regular series Hard – $100,000+H – 32S/26Q/16D; Singles – Doubles	(France) Fabrice Santoro; 7–5, 6–4	(South Africa) Rik de Voest	(Brazil) Thiago Alves (South Africa) Fritz Wolmarans	(France) Nicolas Mahut (Israel) Harel Levy (Slovakia) Karol Beck (Australia) Joseph Sirianni
April 13	2009 Soweto Open; Johannesburg, South Africa; Regular series Hard – $100,000+H – 32S/26Q/16D; Singles – Doubles	(Switzerland) George Bastl (Australia) Chris Guccione; 6–2, 4–6, [11–9]	(Russia) Mikhail Elgin (Russia) Alexander Kudryavtsev	(Brazil) Thiago Alves (South Africa) Fritz Wolmarans	(France) Nicolas Mahut (Israel) Harel Levy (Slovakia) Karol Beck (Australia) Joseph Sirianni
April 13	2009 Abierto Internacional Varonil Club Casablanca; Mexico City, Mexico; Regular series Hard – $35,000+H – 32S/32Q/16D; Singles – Doubles	(Belgium) Dick Norman; 6–4, 6–7(6), 7–5	(Uruguay) Marcel Felder	(Thailand) Danai Udomchoke (South Korea) Im Kyu-tae	(Switzerland) Michael Lammer (Ecuador) Giovanni Lapentti (India) Prakash Amritraj (Poland) Dawid Olejniczak
April 13	2009 Abierto Internacional Varonil Club Casablanca; Mexico City, Mexico; Regular series Hard – $35,000+H – 32S/32Q/16D; Singles – Doubles	(Thailand) Sanchai Ratiwatana (Thailand) Sonchat Ratiwatana; 6–3, 6–3	(Dominican Republic) Víctor Estrella Burgos (Brazil) João Souza	(Thailand) Danai Udomchoke (South Korea) Im Kyu-tae	(Switzerland) Michael Lammer (Ecuador) Giovanni Lapentti (India) Prakash Amritraj (Poland) Dawid Olejniczak
April 13	2009 Rai Open; Rome, Italy; Regular series Clay (red) – €30,000+H – 32S/32Q/16D; Singles – Doubles	(Argentina) Sebastián Decoud; 7–6(2), 6–1	(Germany) Simon Greul	(Italy) Marco Crugnola (France) Éric Prodon	(Italy) Tomas Tenconi (Italy) Andrea Arnaboldi (Czech Republic) Jiří Vaněk (Netherlands) Jesse Huta Galung
April 13	2009 Rai Open; Rome, Italy; Regular series Clay (red) – €30,000+H – 32S/32Q/16D; Singles – Doubles	(Germany) Simon Greul (Italy) Alessandro Motti; 6–4, 7–5	(Italy) Daniele Bracciali (Italy) Filippo Volandri	(Italy) Marco Crugnola (France) Éric Prodon	(Italy) Tomas Tenconi (Italy) Andrea Arnaboldi (Czech Republic) Jiří Vaněk (Netherlands) Jesse Huta Galung
April 20	2009 Zagorka Cup; Sofia, Bulgaria; Regular series Clay (red) – €85,000 – 32S/32Q/16D; Singles – Doubles	(Czech Republic) Ivo Minář; 6–4, 6–3	(Germany) Florian Mayer	(France) Alexandre Sidorenko (Belgium) Steve Darcis	(Austria) Andreas Haider-Maurer (Croatia) Roko Karanušić (Belgium) Olivier Rochus (Czech Republic) Lukáš Rosol
April 20	2009 Zagorka Cup; Sofia, Bulgaria; Regular series Clay (red) – €85,000 – 32S/32Q/16D; Singles – Doubles	(Slovakia) Dominik Hrbatý (Czech Republic) David Škoch; 6–2, 6–4	(United Kingdom) James Auckland (Australia) Peter Luczak	(France) Alexandre Sidorenko (Belgium) Steve Darcis	(Austria) Andreas Haider-Maurer (Croatia) Roko Karanušić (Belgium) Olivier Rochus (Czech Republic) Lukáš Rosol
April 20	2009 Tallahassee Tennis Challenger; Tallahassee, United States; Regular series Hard – $50,000 – 32S/32Q/16D/4Q; Singles – Doubles	(United States) John Isner; 7–5, 6–4	(United States) Donald Young	(Thailand) Danai Udomchoke (United States) Robert Kendrick	(United States) Ryan Sweeting (India) Prakash Amritraj (South Korea) Im Kyu-tae (Australia) Marinko Matosevic
April 20	2009 Tallahassee Tennis Challenger; Tallahassee, United States; Regular series Hard – $50,000 – 32S/32Q/16D/4Q; Singles – Doubles	(United States) Eric Butorac (United States) Scott Lipsky; 6–1, 6–4	(United Kingdom) Colin Fleming (United Kingdom) Ken Skupski	(Thailand) Danai Udomchoke (United States) Robert Kendrick	(United States) Ryan Sweeting (India) Prakash Amritraj (South Korea) Im Kyu-tae (Australia) Marinko Matosevic
April 20	2009 Roma Open; Rome, Italy; Regular series Clay (red) – €30,000+H – 32S/32Q/16D; Singles – Doubles	(Austria) Daniel Köllerer; 6–3, 6–3	(Sweden) Andreas Vinciguerra	(Italy) Paolo Lorenzi (Italy) Filippo Volandri	(Serbia) Ilija Bozoljac (Romania) Victor Crivoi (United States) Michael Russell (Czech Republic) Jiří Vaněk
April 20	2009 Roma Open; Rome, Italy; Regular series Clay (red) – €30,000+H – 32S/32Q/16D; Singles – Doubles	(Germany) Simon Greul (Germany) Christopher Kas; 4–6, 7–6(2), [10–2]	(Sweden) Johan Brunström (Netherlands Antilles) Jean-Julien Rojer	(Italy) Paolo Lorenzi (Italy) Filippo Volandri	(Serbia) Ilija Bozoljac (Romania) Victor Crivoi (United States) Michael Russell (Czech Republic) Jiří Vaněk
April 27	2009 Tunis Open; Tunis, Tunisia; Tretorn SERIE+ Clay (red) – $125,000+H – 32S/32Q/16D; Singles – Doubles	(Argentina) Gastón Gaudio; 6–2, 1–6, 6–3	(Portugal) Fred Gil	(Finland) Jarkko Nieminen (Croatia) Roko Karanušić	(Argentina) Guillermo Cañas (France) Alexandre Sidorenko (Portugal) Rui Machado (Argentina) Diego Junqueira
April 27	2009 Tunis Open; Tunis, Tunisia; Tretorn SERIE+ Clay (red) – $125,000+H – 32S/32Q/16D; Singles – Doubles	(Argentina) Brian Dabul (Argentina) Leonardo Mayer; 6–4, 7–6(6)	(Sweden) Johan Brunström (Netherlands Antilles) Jean-Julien Rojer	(Finland) Jarkko Nieminen (Croatia) Roko Karanušić	(Argentina) Guillermo Cañas (France) Alexandre Sidorenko (Portugal) Rui Machado (Argentina) Diego Junqueira
April 27	2009 Aegean Tennis Cup; Rhodes, Greece; Tretorn SERIE+ Hard – €85,000+H – 32S/23Q/16D; Singles – Doubles	(Germany) Benjamin Becker; 7–5, 6–3	(Germany) Simon Stadler	(India) Prakash Amritraj (Brazil) Thiago Alves	(Israel) Dudi Sela (Germany) Benedikt Dorsch (United States) Brendan Evans (India) Rohan Bopanna
April 27	2009 Aegean Tennis Cup; Rhodes, Greece; Tretorn SERIE+ Hard – €85,000+H – 32S/23Q/16D; Singles – Doubles	(Slovakia) Karol Beck (Czech Republic) Jaroslav Levinský; 6–3, 6–3	(United States) Rajeev Ram (United States) Bobby Reynolds	(India) Prakash Amritraj (Brazil) Thiago Alves	(Israel) Dudi Sela (Germany) Benedikt Dorsch (United States) Brendan Evans (India) Rohan Bopanna
April 27	2009 Prosperita Open; Ostrava, Czech Republic; Regular series Clay (red) – €42,500 – 32S/32Q/16D; Singles – Doubles	(Czech Republic) Jan Hájek; 7–5, 6–1	(Croatia) Ivan Dodig	(Belgium) Steve Darcis (Spain) David Marrero	(Poland) Łukasz Kubot (Czech Republic) Lukáš Rosol (Belgium) Olivier Rochus (Czech Republic) Jiří Vaněk
April 27	2009 Prosperita Open; Ostrava, Czech Republic; Regular series Clay (red) – €42,500 – 32S/32Q/16D; Singles – Doubles	(Czech Republic) Jan Hájek (Czech Republic) Robin Vik; 6–2, 6–4	(Slovakia) Matúš Horečný (Slovakia) Tomáš Janči	(Belgium) Steve Darcis (Spain) David Marrero	(Poland) Łukasz Kubot (Czech Republic) Lukáš Rosol (Belgium) Olivier Rochus (Czech Republic) Jiří Vaněk
April 27	2009 Seguros Bolívar Open Pereira; Pereira, Colombia; Regular series Clay (red) – $35,000+H – 32S/30Q/16D; Singles – Doubles	(Colombia) Alejandro Falla; 6–4, 4–6, 6–2	(Argentina) Horacio Zeballos	(Argentina) Mariano Puerta (Brazil) João Souza	(Colombia) Eduardo Struvay (United Kingdom) James Ward (Ecuador) Giovanni Lapentti (Colombia) Santiago Giraldo
April 27	2009 Seguros Bolívar Open Pereira; Pereira, Colombia; Regular series Clay (red) – $35,000+H – 32S/30Q/16D; Singles – Doubles	(Dominican Republic) Víctor Estrella Burgos (Brazil) João Souza; 6–4, 6–4	(Colombia) Juan Sebastián Cabal (Colombia) Alejandro Falla	(Argentina) Mariano Puerta (Brazil) João Souza	(Colombia) Eduardo Struvay (United Kingdom) James Ward (Ecuador) Giovanni Lapentti (Colombia) Santiago Giraldo
April 27	2009 Open Costa Adeje – Isla de Tenerife; Tenerife, Spain; Regular series Hard – €30,000+H – 32S/28Q/16D; Singles – Doubles	(Switzerland) Marco Chiudinelli; 6–3, 6–4	(Italy) Paolo Lorenzi	(Spain) Iván Navarro (Germany) Philipp Petzschner	(Chinese Taipei) Lu Yen-hsun (Sweden) Björn Rehnquist (Switzerland) Michael Lammer (United States) Michael Yani
April 27	2009 Open Costa Adeje – Isla de Tenerife; Tenerife, Spain; Regular series Hard – €30,000+H – 32S/28Q/16D; Singles – Doubles	(Germany) Philipp Petzschner (Austria) Alexander Peya; 6–2, 3–6, [10–4]	(United Kingdom) James Auckland (United Kingdom) Josh Goodall	(Spain) Iván Navarro (Germany) Philipp Petzschner	(Chinese Taipei) Lu Yen-hsun (Sweden) Björn Rehnquist (Switzerland) Michael Lammer (United States) Michael Yani

=== May ===
Week of	Tournament	Champions	Runners-up	Semifinalists	Quarterfinalists
May 4	2009 Israel Open; Ramat HaSharon, Israel; Tretorn SERIE+ Hard – $100,000 – 32S/32Q/16D; Singles – Doubles	(Chinese Taipei) Lu Yen-hsun; 6–3, 3–1 retired	(Germany) Benjamin Becker	(Australia) Marinko Matosevic (Germany) Simon Stadler	(Israel) Dudi Sela (Israel) Harel Levy (Turkey) Marsel İlhan (Germany) Benedikt Dorsch
May 4	2009 Israel Open; Ramat HaSharon, Israel; Tretorn SERIE+ Hard – $100,000 – 32S/32Q/16D; Singles – Doubles	(Switzerland) George Bastl (Australia) Chris Guccione; 7–5, 7–6(6)	(Israel) Jonathan Erlich (Israel) Andy Ram	(Australia) Marinko Matosevic (Germany) Simon Stadler	(Israel) Dudi Sela (Israel) Harel Levy (Turkey) Marsel İlhan (Germany) Benedikt Dorsch
May 4	2009 Tail Savannah Challenger; Savannah, United States; Regular series Clay (green) – $50,000 – 32S/20Q/16D/3Q; Singles – Doubles	(United States) Michael Russell; 6–4, 7–6(6)	(United States) Alex Kuznetsov	(United States) Kevin Kim (United States) Jesse Levine	(South Africa) Fritz Wolmarans (United States) John Isner (Uruguay) Marcel Felder (United States) Ryler DeHeart
May 4	2009 Tail Savannah Challenger; Savannah, United States; Regular series Clay (green) – $50,000 – 32S/20Q/16D/3Q; Singles – Doubles	(Australia) Carsten Ball (United States) Travis Rettenmaier; 7–6(4), 6–4	(India) Harsh Mankad (United States) Kaes Van't Hof	(United States) Kevin Kim (United States) Jesse Levine	(South Africa) Fritz Wolmarans (United States) John Isner (Uruguay) Marcel Felder (United States) Ryler DeHeart
May 4	2009 Sanremo Tennis Cup; Sanremo, Italy; Regular series Clay (red) – €30,000+H – 32S/20Q/16D; Singles – Doubles	(South Africa) Kevin Anderson; 2–6, 6–2, 7–5	(Slovenia) Blaž Kavčič	(Kazakhstan) Yuri Schukin (Italy) Daniele Bracciali	(Serbia) Ilija Bozoljac (Spain) Miguel Ángel López Jaén (Argentina) Juan Pablo Brzezicki (Italy) Daniele Giorgini
May 4	2009 Sanremo Tennis Cup; Sanremo, Italy; Regular series Clay (red) – €30,000+H – 32S/20Q/16D; Singles – Doubles	(Kazakhstan) Yuri Schukin (Russia) Dmitri Sitak; 6–4, 7–6(4)	(Italy) Daniele Bracciali (Italy) Giancarlo Petrazzuolo	(Kazakhstan) Yuri Schukin (Italy) Daniele Bracciali	(Serbia) Ilija Bozoljac (Spain) Miguel Ángel López Jaén (Argentina) Juan Pablo Brzezicki (Italy) Daniele Giorgini
May 11	2009 BNP Paribas Primrose Bordeaux; Bordeaux, France; Regular series Clay (red) – €85,000+H – 32S/25Q/16D; Singles – Doubles	(France) Marc Gicquel; 3–6, 6–1, 6–4	(France) Mathieu Montcourt	(France) Laurent Recouderc (Kazakhstan) Andrey Golubev	(Argentina) Gastón Gaudio (France) Arnaud Clément (France) Josselin Ouanna (Kazakhstan) Yuri Schukin
May 11	2009 BNP Paribas Primrose Bordeaux; Bordeaux, France; Regular series Clay (red) – €85,000+H – 32S/25Q/16D; Singles – Doubles	(Uruguay) Pablo Cuevas (Argentina) Horacio Zeballos; 4–6, 6–4, [10–4]	(France) Xavier Pujo (France) Stéphane Robert	(France) Laurent Recouderc (Kazakhstan) Andrey Golubev	(Argentina) Gastón Gaudio (France) Arnaud Clément (France) Josselin Ouanna (Kazakhstan) Yuri Schukin
May 11	2009 Busan Open Challenger Tennis; Busan, South Korea; Regular series Hard – $75,000+H – 32S/32Q/16D/4Q; Singles – Doubles	(Thailand) Danai Udomchoke; 6–2, 6–2	(Slovenia) Blaž Kavčič	(South Korea) Im Kyu-tae (Germany) Florian Mayer	(Japan) Toshihide Matsui (Pakistan) Aisam-ul-Haq Qureshi (Slovakia) Lukáš Lacko (Australia) Sam Groth
May 11	2009 Busan Open Challenger Tennis; Busan, South Korea; Regular series Hard – $75,000+H – 32S/32Q/16D/4Q; Singles – Doubles	(Thailand) Sanchai Ratiwatana (Thailand) Sonchat Ratiwatana; 6–4, 6–2	(Japan) Tasuku Iwami (Japan) Toshihide Matsui	(South Korea) Im Kyu-tae (Germany) Florian Mayer	(Japan) Toshihide Matsui (Pakistan) Aisam-ul-Haq Qureshi (Slovakia) Lukáš Lacko (Australia) Sam Groth
May 11	2009 Türk Telecom İzmir Cup; İzmir, Turkey; Regular series Hard – €64,000+H – 32S/31Q/16D; Singles – Doubles	(Italy) Andrea Stoppini; 7–6(5), 6–2	(Turkey) Marsel İlhan	(Israel) Harel Levy (Sweden) Joachim Johansson	(Italy) Paolo Lorenzi (Czech Republic) Pavel Šnobel (United Kingdom) Josh Goodall (Germany) Dominik Meffert
May 11	2009 Türk Telecom İzmir Cup; İzmir, Turkey; Regular series Hard – €64,000+H – 32S/31Q/16D; Singles – Doubles	(Israel) Jonathan Erlich (Israel) Harel Levy; 6–3, 6–3	(India) Prakash Amritraj (United States) Rajeev Ram	(Israel) Harel Levy (Sweden) Joachim Johansson	(Italy) Paolo Lorenzi (Czech Republic) Pavel Šnobel (United Kingdom) Josh Goodall (Germany) Dominik Meffert
May 11	2009 All Star Children's Foundation Sarasota Open; Sarasota, United States; Regular series Clay – $50,000 – 32S/32Q/16D/4Q; Singles – Doubles	(United Kingdom) James Ward; 7–6(4), 4–6, 6–3	(Australia) Carsten Ball	(Belgium) Xavier Malisse (United States) Michael Yani	(United States) Ryan Harrison (France) Éric Prodon (United States) Michael Russell (France) Jonathan Dasnières de Veigy
May 11	2009 All Star Children's Foundation Sarasota Open; Sarasota, United States; Regular series Clay – $50,000 – 32S/32Q/16D/4Q; Singles – Doubles	(Dominican Republic) Víctor Estrella Burgos (Mexico) Santiago González; 6–2, 6–4	(India) Harsh Mankad (United States) Kaes Van't Hof	(Belgium) Xavier Malisse (United States) Michael Yani	(United States) Ryan Harrison (France) Éric Prodon (United States) Michael Russell (France) Jonathan Dasnières de Veigy
May 11	2009 Zagreb Open; Zagreb, Croatia; Regular series Clay (red) – $50,000+H – 32S/32Q/16D; Singles – Doubles	(Brazil) Marcos Daniel; 6–3, 6–4	(Belgium) Olivier Rochus	(France) Nicolas Devilder (Brazil) Ricardo Hocevar	(Serbia) Ilija Bozoljac (Argentina) Brian Dabul (Serbia) Boris Pašanski (Croatia) Roko Karanušić
May 11	2009 Zagreb Open; Zagreb, Croatia; Regular series Clay (red) – $50,000+H – 32S/32Q/16D; Singles – Doubles	(Australia) Peter Luczak (Italy) Alessandro Motti; 6–4, 6–4	(United States) Brendan Evans (United States) Ryan Sweeting	(France) Nicolas Devilder (Brazil) Ricardo Hocevar	(Serbia) Ilija Bozoljac (Argentina) Brian Dabul (Serbia) Boris Pašanski (Croatia) Roko Karanušić
May 11	2009 Aberto Santa Catarina de Tenis; Blumenau, Brazil; Regular series Clay (red) – $35,000+H – 32S/32Q/16D; Singles – Doubles	(Brazil) Marcelo Demoliner; 6–1, 6–0	(Brazil) Rogério Dutra Silva	(Portugal) Leonardo Tavares (Brazil) Eric Gomes	(Brazil) Júlio Silva (Uruguay) Marcel Felder (Serbia) David Savić (Brazil) Daniel Dutra da Silva
May 11	2009 Aberto Santa Catarina de Tenis; Blumenau, Brazil; Regular series Clay (red) – $35,000+H – 32S/32Q/16D; Singles – Doubles	(Brazil) Marcelo Demoliner (Brazil) Rodrigo Guidolin; 7–5, 4–6, [13–11]	(Brazil) Rogério Dutra Silva (Brazil) Júlio Silva	(Portugal) Leonardo Tavares (Brazil) Eric Gomes	(Brazil) Júlio Silva (Uruguay) Marcel Felder (Serbia) David Savić (Brazil) Daniel Dutra da Silva
May 18	2009 Fergana Challenger; Fergana, Uzbekistan; Regular series Hard – €35,000+H – 32S/27Q/16D; Singles – Doubles	(Slovakia) Lukáš Lacko; 4–6, 7–5, 7–6(4)	(Australia) Sam Groth	(Ukraine) Illya Marchenko (Russia) Evgeny Kirillov	(Thailand) Danai Udomchoke (Canada) Pierre-Ludovic Duclos (Russia) Alexander Kudryavtsev (Russia) Artem Sitak
May 18	2009 Fergana Challenger; Fergana, Uzbekistan; Regular series Hard – €35,000+H – 32S/27Q/16D; Singles – Doubles	(Russia) Pavel Chekhov (Kazakhstan) Alexey Kedryuk; 4–6, 6–3, [10–5]	(Canada) Pierre-Ludovic Duclos (Pakistan) Aisam-ul-Haq Qureshi	(Ukraine) Illya Marchenko (Russia) Evgeny Kirillov	(Thailand) Danai Udomchoke (Canada) Pierre-Ludovic Duclos (Russia) Alexander Kudryavtsev (Russia) Artem Sitak
May 18	2009 Trofeo Paolo Corazzi; Cremona, Italy; Regular series Hard – €30,000+H – 32S/18Q/16D; Singles – Doubles	(Germany) Benjamin Becker; 7–6(3), 6–1	(South Africa) Izak van der Merwe	(Switzerland) Marco Chiudinelli (Italy) Stefano Galvani	(Bulgaria) Grigor Dimitrov (Australia) Nick Lindahl (Republic of Ireland) Conor Niland (Czech Republic) Jan Minář
May 18	2009 Trofeo Paolo Corazzi; Cremona, Italy; Regular series Hard – €30,000+H – 32S/18Q/16D; Singles – Doubles	(United Kingdom) Colin Fleming (United Kingdom) Ken Skupski; 6–2, 6–1	(Italy) Daniele Bracciali (Italy) Alessandro Motti	(Switzerland) Marco Chiudinelli (Italy) Stefano Galvani	(Bulgaria) Grigor Dimitrov (Australia) Nick Lindahl (Republic of Ireland) Conor Niland (Czech Republic) Jan Minář
May 25	2009 USTA LA Tennis Open; Carson, United States; Regular series Hard – $50,000 – 32S/32Q/16D/4Q; Singles – Doubles	(United States) Michael Russell; 6–1, 6–1	(United States) Michael Yani	(Sweden) Michael Ryderstedt (United States) Lester Cook	(South Africa) Fritz Wolmarans (Australia) Nick Lindahl (United States) Jesse Witten (Thailand) Danai Udomchoke
May 25	2009 USTA LA Tennis Open; Carson, United States; Regular series Hard – $50,000 – 32S/32Q/16D/4Q; Singles – Doubles	(India) Harsh Mankad (Denmark) Frederik Nielsen; 6–4, 6–4	(Australia) Carsten Ball (United States) Travis Rettenmaier	(Sweden) Michael Ryderstedt (United States) Lester Cook	(South Africa) Fritz Wolmarans (Australia) Nick Lindahl (United States) Jesse Witten (Thailand) Danai Udomchoke
May 25	2009 Alessandria Challenger; Alessandria, Italy; Regular series Clay (red) – €30,000+H – 32S/14Q/16D; Singles – Doubles	(Slovenia) Blaž Kavčič; 7–5, 6–3	(United States) Jesse Levine	(Spain) Rubén Ramírez Hidalgo (Colombia) Alejandro Falla	(France) Stéphane Robert (Italy) Marco Crugnola (Brazil) Ricardo Hocevar (Spain) Daniel Muñoz de la Nava
May 25	2009 Alessandria Challenger; Alessandria, Italy; Regular series Clay (red) – €30,000+H – 32S/14Q/16D; Singles – Doubles	(Spain) Rubén Ramírez Hidalgo (Spain) José Antonio Sánchez de Luna; 6–4, 6–2	(Argentina) Martín Alund (Chile) Guillermo Hormazábal	(Spain) Rubén Ramírez Hidalgo (Colombia) Alejandro Falla	(France) Stéphane Robert (Italy) Marco Crugnola (Brazil) Ricardo Hocevar (Spain) Daniel Muñoz de la Nava
May 25	2009 Baden Open; Karlsruhe, Germany; Regular series Clay (red) – €30,000+H – 32S/32Q/16D; Singles – Doubles	(Germany) Florian Mayer; 6–2, 6–4	(Jamaica) Dustin Brown	(Germany) Julian Reister (Germany) Dominik Meffert	(Germany) Matthias Bachinger (Lithuania) Ričardas Berankis (Belgium) Niels Desein (Spain) Pere Riba
May 25	2009 Baden Open; Karlsruhe, Germany; Regular series Clay (red) – €30,000+H – 32S/32Q/16D; Singles – Doubles	(Australia) Rameez Junaid (Germany) Philipp Marx; 7–5, 6–4	(Poland) Tomasz Bednarek (Pakistan) Aisam-ul-Haq Qureshi	(Germany) Julian Reister (Germany) Dominik Meffert	(Germany) Matthias Bachinger (Lithuania) Ričardas Berankis (Belgium) Niels Desein (Spain) Pere Riba

=== June ===
Week of	Tournament	Champions	Runners-up	Semifinalists	Quarterfinalists
June 1	2009 UniCredit Czech Open; Prostějov, Czech Republic; Regular series Clay (red) – €127,500+H – 32S/32Q/16D; Singles – Doubles	(Czech Republic) Jan Hájek; 6–2, 1–6, 6–4	(Belgium) Steve Darcis	(Italy) Potito Starace (Czech Republic) Tomáš Berdych	(Spain) Alberto Martín (Croatia) Ivan Ljubičić (Spain) Iván Navarro (Slovakia) Martin Kližan
June 1	2009 UniCredit Czech Open; Prostějov, Czech Republic; Regular series Clay (red) – €127,500+H – 32S/32Q/16D; Singles – Doubles	(Sweden) Johan Brunström (Netherlands Antilles) Jean-Julien Rojer; 6–2, 6–3	(Uruguay) Pablo Cuevas (Slovakia) Dominik Hrbatý	(Italy) Potito Starace (Czech Republic) Tomáš Berdych	(Spain) Alberto Martín (Croatia) Ivan Ljubičić (Spain) Iván Navarro (Slovakia) Martin Kližan
June 1	2009 Sunset Moulding YCRC Challenger; Yuba City, United States; Regular series Hard – $50,000 – 32S/32Q/16D/4Q; Singles – Doubles	(United States) Ryler DeHeart; 6–2, 3–6, 7–5	(Australia) Carsten Ball	(United States) Michael Russell (United States) Michael Yani	(Philippines) Cecil Mamiit (Australia) Adam Feeney (United States) Lester Cook (United States) Eric Nunez
June 1	2009 Sunset Moulding YCRC Challenger; Yuba City, United States; Regular series Hard – $50,000 – 32S/32Q/16D/4Q; Singles – Doubles	(Australia) Carsten Ball (United States) Travis Rettenmaier; 6–3, 6–4	(Australia) Adam Feeney (Australia) Nathan Healey	(United States) Michael Russell (United States) Michael Yani	(Philippines) Cecil Mamiit (Australia) Adam Feeney (United States) Lester Cook (United States) Eric Nunez
June 1	2009 Schickedanz Open; Fürth, Germany; Regular series Clay (red) – €42,500+H – 32S/32Q/16D; Singles – Doubles	(Australia) Peter Luczak; 6–2, 6–0	(Argentina) Juan Pablo Brzezicki	(Russia) Teymuraz Gabashvili (Germany) Daniel Brands	(Spain) Pere Riba (Spain) Rubén Ramírez Hidalgo (Czech Republic) Jiří Vaněk (Austria) Daniel Köllerer
June 1	2009 Schickedanz Open; Fürth, Germany; Regular series Clay (red) – €42,500+H – 32S/32Q/16D; Singles – Doubles	(Spain) Rubén Ramírez Hidalgo (Spain) Santiago Ventura; 4–6, 6–1, [10–6]	(Germany) Simon Greul (Italy) Alessandro Motti	(Russia) Teymuraz Gabashvili (Germany) Daniel Brands	(Spain) Pere Riba (Spain) Rubén Ramírez Hidalgo (Czech Republic) Jiří Vaněk (Austria) Daniel Köllerer
June 1	2009 Aegon Trophy; Nottingham, United Kingdom; Regular series Grass – €42,500 – 32S/32Q/16D/4Q; Singles – Doubles	(United States) Brendan Evans; 6–7(4), 6–4, 7–6(4)	(Serbia) Ilija Bozoljac	(United Kingdom) Josh Goodall (Ukraine) Sergei Bubka	(India) Prakash Amritraj (Bulgaria) Grigor Dimitrov (France) Adrian Mannarino (United States) Robert Kendrick
June 1	2009 Aegon Trophy; Nottingham, United Kingdom; Regular series Grass – €42,500 – 32S/32Q/16D/4Q; Singles – Doubles	(United States) Eric Butorac (United States) Scott Lipsky; 6–4, 6–4	(United Kingdom) Colin Fleming (United Kingdom) Ken Skupski	(United Kingdom) Josh Goodall (Ukraine) Sergei Bubka	(India) Prakash Amritraj (Bulgaria) Grigor Dimitrov (France) Adrian Mannarino (United States) Robert Kendrick
June 8	2009 BSI Challenger Lugano; Lugano, Switzerland; Tretorn SERIE+ Clay (red) – €85,000+H – 32S/32Q/16D; Singles – Doubles	(Switzerland) Stan Wawrinka; 7–5, 6–3	(Italy) Potito Starace	(Australia) Peter Luczak (Italy) Andrea Arnaboldi	(France) Mathieu Montcourt (Czech Republic) Lukáš Rosol (Germany) Simon Greul (Argentina) Cristian Villagrán
June 8	2009 BSI Challenger Lugano; Lugano, Switzerland; Tretorn SERIE+ Clay (red) – €85,000+H – 32S/32Q/16D; Singles – Doubles	(Sweden) Johan Brunström (Netherlands Antilles) Jean-Julien Rojer walkover	(Uruguay) Pablo Cuevas (Argentina) Sergio Roitman	(Australia) Peter Luczak (Italy) Andrea Arnaboldi	(France) Mathieu Montcourt (Czech Republic) Lukáš Rosol (Germany) Simon Greul (Argentina) Cristian Villagrán
June 8	2009 Košice Open; Košice, Slovakia; Regular series Clay (red) – €30,000+H – 32S/28Q/16D; Singles – Doubles	(France) Stéphane Robert; 7–6(5), 7–6(5)	(Czech Republic) Jiří Vaněk	(Spain) Miguel Ángel López Jaén (Serbia) Boris Pašanski	(Slovakia) Martin Kližan (Romania) Adrian Ungur (Czech Republic) Jan Hájek (Spain) Rubén Ramírez Hidalgo
June 8	2009 Košice Open; Košice, Slovakia; Regular series Clay (red) – €30,000+H – 32S/28Q/16D; Singles – Doubles	(Spain) Rubén Ramírez Hidalgo (Spain) Santiago Ventura; 6–2, 7–6(5)	(Slovakia) Dominik Hrbatý (Slovakia) Martin Kližan	(Spain) Miguel Ángel López Jaén (Serbia) Boris Pašanski	(Slovakia) Martin Kližan (Romania) Adrian Ungur (Czech Republic) Jan Hájek (Spain) Rubén Ramírez Hidalgo
June 15	2009 Polska Energia Open; Bytom, Poland; Regular series Clay (red) – €30,000+H – 32S/32Q/16D; Singles – Doubles	(France) Laurent Recouderc; 6–3, 6–4	(Czech Republic) Jan Hájek	(Slovakia) Pavol Červenák (Spain) Rubén Ramírez Hidalgo	(Poland) Jerzy Janowicz (Spain) Santiago Ventura (France) Guillaume Rufin (Argentina) Nicolás Todero
June 15	2009 Polska Energia Open; Bytom, Poland; Regular series Clay (red) – €30,000+H – 32S/32Q/16D; Singles – Doubles	(Spain) Pablo Santos (Spain) Gabriel Trujillo Soler; 6–3, 7–6(3)	(Czech Republic) Jan Hájek (Czech Republic) Dušan Karol	(Slovakia) Pavol Červenák (Spain) Rubén Ramírez Hidalgo	(Poland) Jerzy Janowicz (Spain) Santiago Ventura (France) Guillaume Rufin (Argentina) Nicolás Todero
June 15	2009 Zenith Tennis Cup; Milan, Italy; Regular series Clay (red) – €30,000+H – 32S/25Q/16D; Singles – Doubles	(Italy) Alessio di Mauro; 6–4, 7–6(3)	(France) Vincent Millot	(Argentina) Federico Delbonis (Italy) Filippo Volandri	(Chile) Nicolás Massú (Argentina) Mariano Puerta (France) Mathieu Montcourt (United States) Wayne Odesnik
June 15	2009 Zenith Tennis Cup; Milan, Italy; Regular series Clay (red) – €30,000+H – 32S/25Q/16D; Singles – Doubles	(Switzerland) Yves Allegro (Italy) Daniele Bracciali; 6–4, 6–2	(Italy) Manuel Jorquera (Italy) Francesco Piccari	(Argentina) Federico Delbonis (Italy) Filippo Volandri	(Chile) Nicolás Massú (Argentina) Mariano Puerta (France) Mathieu Montcourt (United States) Wayne Odesnik
June 22	2009 Camparini Gioielli Cup; Reggio Emilia, Italy; Regular series Clay (red) – €42,500+H – 32S/28Q/16D; Singles – Doubles	(Italy) Paolo Lorenzi; 7–5, 1–6, 6–2	(Monaco) Jean-René Lisnard	(Germany) Denis Gremelmayr (Argentina) Sebastián Decoud	(Canada) Peter Polansky (Spain) Miguel Ángel López Jaén (Italy) Flavio Cipolla (Brazil) Marcos Daniel
June 22	2009 Camparini Gioielli Cup; Reggio Emilia, Italy; Regular series Clay (red) – €42,500+H – 32S/28Q/16D; Singles – Doubles	(Spain) Miguel Ángel López Jaén (Spain) Pere Riba; 6–4, 6–4	(Italy) Gianluca Naso (Italy) Walter Trusendi	(Germany) Denis Gremelmayr (Argentina) Sebastián Decoud	(Canada) Peter Polansky (Spain) Miguel Ángel López Jaén (Italy) Flavio Cipolla (Brazil) Marcos Daniel
June 22	2009 Mamaia Challenger; Constanța, Romania; Regular series Clay (red) – €30,000+H – 32S/32Q/16D; Singles – Doubles	(Slovenia) Blaž Kavčič; 3–6, 6–3, 6–4	(Germany) Julian Reister	(Brazil) João Souza (Austria) Andreas Haider-Maurer	(Czech Republic) Jaroslav Pospíšil (Romania) Adrian Ungur (Spain) Fernando Vicente (Germany) Dieter Kindlmann
June 22	2009 Mamaia Challenger; Constanța, Romania; Regular series Clay (red) – €30,000+H – 32S/32Q/16D; Singles – Doubles	(Chile) Adrián García (Spain) David Marrero; 7–6(5), 6–2	(Romania) Adrian Cruciat (Romania) Florin Mergea	(Brazil) João Souza (Austria) Andreas Haider-Maurer	(Czech Republic) Jaroslav Pospíšil (Romania) Adrian Ungur (Spain) Fernando Vicente (Germany) Dieter Kindlmann
June 29	2009 Nord LB Open; Braunschweig, Germany; Regular series Clay (red) – €106,500+H – 32S/25Q/16D; Singles – Doubles	(Spain) Óscar Hernández; 6–1, 3–6, 6–4	(Russia) Teymuraz Gabashvili	(Germany) Andreas Beck (Germany) Florian Mayer	(Spain) Alberto Martín (Czech Republic) Lukáš Rosol (Chile) Nicolás Massú (Belgium) Kristof Vliegen
June 29	2009 Nord LB Open; Braunschweig, Germany; Regular series Clay (red) – €106,500+H – 32S/25Q/16D; Singles – Doubles	(Sweden) Johan Brunström (Netherlands Antilles) Jean-Julien Rojer; 7–6(2), 6–4	(Argentina) Brian Dabul (Chile) Nicolás Massú	(Germany) Andreas Beck (Germany) Florian Mayer	(Spain) Alberto Martín (Czech Republic) Lukáš Rosol (Chile) Nicolás Massú (Belgium) Kristof Vliegen
June 29	2009 Sporting Challenger; Turin, Italy; Tretorn SERIE+ Clay (red) – €85,000+H – 32S/32Q/16D; Singles – Doubles	(Italy) Potito Starace; 7–6(4), 6–3	(Argentina) Máximo González	(Germany) Simon Greul (Czech Republic) Jiří Vaněk	(Italy) Thomas Fabbiano (Colombia) Santiago Giraldo (Sweden) Andreas Vinciguerra (Brazil) Thiago Alves
June 29	2009 Sporting Challenger; Turin, Italy; Tretorn SERIE+ Clay (red) – €85,000+H – 32S/32Q/16D; Singles – Doubles	(Italy) Daniele Bracciali (Italy) Potito Starace; 6–3, 6–4	(Colombia) Santiago Giraldo (Spain) Pere Riba	(Germany) Simon Greul (Czech Republic) Jiří Vaněk	(Italy) Thomas Fabbiano (Colombia) Santiago Giraldo (Sweden) Andreas Vinciguerra (Brazil) Thiago Alves
June 29	2009 Nielsen Pro Tennis Championship; Winnetka, United States; Regular series Hard – $50,000 – 32S/21Q/16D; Singles – Doubles	(United States) Alex Kuznetsov; 6–4, 7–6(1)	(United States) Tim Smyczek	(United States) Ryler DeHeart (Denmark) Kristian Pless	(United States) Scoville Jenkins (United States) Donald Young (Slovenia) Luka Gregorc (United States) Todd Widom
June 29	2009 Nielsen Pro Tennis Championship; Winnetka, United States; Regular series Hard – $50,000 – 32S/21Q/16D; Singles – Doubles	(Australia) Carsten Ball (United States) Travis Rettenmaier; 6–1, 6–2	(United States) Brett Joelson (United States) Ryan Sweeting	(United States) Ryler DeHeart (Denmark) Kristian Pless	(United States) Scoville Jenkins (United States) Donald Young (Slovenia) Luka Gregorc (United States) Todd Widom
June 29	2009 Rijeka Open; Rijeka, Croatia; Regular series Clay (red) – €30,000+H – 32S/32Q/16D; Singles – Doubles	(Italy) Paolo Lorenzi; 6–3, 7–6(2)	(Slovenia) Blaž Kavčič	(Czech Republic) Jan Hájek (France) Mathieu Montcourt	(Switzerland) Michael Lammer (Switzerland) Stéphane Bohli (France) Stéphane Robert (Italy) Simone Vagnozzi
June 29	2009 Rijeka Open; Rijeka, Croatia; Regular series Clay (red) – €30,000+H – 32S/32Q/16D; Singles – Doubles	(Argentina) Sebastián Decoud (Spain) Miguel Ángel López Jaén; 7–6(7), 3–6, [10–8]	(Croatia) Ivan Dodig (Croatia) Antonio Veić	(Czech Republic) Jan Hájek (France) Mathieu Montcourt	(Switzerland) Michael Lammer (Switzerland) Stéphane Bohli (France) Stéphane Robert (Italy) Simone Vagnozzi

=== July ===
Week of	Tournament	Champions	Runners-up	Semifinalists	Quarterfinalists
July 6	2009 Open Diputación Ciudad de Pozoblanco; Pozoblanco, Spain; Tretorn SERIE+ Hard – €85,000+H – 32S/32Q/16D; Singles – Doubles	(Slovakia) Karol Beck; 6–4, 6–3	(Brazil) Thiago Alves	(Switzerland) Marco Chiudinelli (Switzerland) Stéphane Bohli	(Spain) Iván Navarro (Spain) Marcel Granollers (Spain) Steven Diez (Slovakia) Lukáš Lacko
July 6	2009 Open Diputación Ciudad de Pozoblanco; Pozoblanco, Spain; Tretorn SERIE+ Hard – €85,000+H – 32S/32Q/16D; Singles – Doubles	(Slovakia) Karol Beck (Czech Republic) Jaroslav Levinský; 2–6, 7–6(5), [10–7]	(United Kingdom) Colin Fleming (United Kingdom) Ken Skupski	(Switzerland) Marco Chiudinelli (Switzerland) Stéphane Bohli	(Spain) Iván Navarro (Spain) Marcel Granollers (Spain) Steven Diez (Slovakia) Lukáš Lacko
July 6	2009 Siemens Open; Scheveningen, Netherlands; Tretorn SERIE+ Clay (red) – €64,000+H – 32S/18Q/16D; Singles – Doubles	(Belgium) Kristof Vliegen; 4–2 retired	(Spain) Albert Montañés	(Belgium) Steve Darcis (Uruguay) Pablo Cuevas	(Austria) Daniel Köllerer (Argentina) Juan Ignacio Chela (Italy) Tomas Tenconi (Netherlands) Raemon Sluiter
July 6	2009 Siemens Open; Scheveningen, Netherlands; Tretorn SERIE+ Clay (red) – €64,000+H – 32S/18Q/16D; Singles – Doubles	(Argentina) Lucas Arnold Ker (Argentina) Máximo González; 7–5, 6–2	(Netherlands) Thomas Schoorel (Netherlands) Nick van der Meer	(Belgium) Steve Darcis (Uruguay) Pablo Cuevas	(Austria) Daniel Köllerer (Argentina) Juan Ignacio Chela (Italy) Tomas Tenconi (Netherlands) Raemon Sluiter
July 6	2009 San Benedetto Tennis Cup; San Benedetto del Tronto, Italy; Regular series Clay (red) – €30,000+H – 32S/32Q/16D; Singles – Doubles	(Italy) Fabio Fognini; 6–7(5), 7–6(2), 6–0	(Argentina) Cristian Villagrán	(Spain) Albert Ramos Viñolas (Spain) Guillermo Olaso	(France) Thierry Ascione (Argentina) Sebastián Decoud (Slovakia) Martin Kližan (Czech Republic) Jaroslav Pospíšil
July 6	2009 San Benedetto Tennis Cup; San Benedetto del Tronto, Italy; Regular series Clay (red) – €30,000+H – 32S/32Q/16D; Singles – Doubles	(Italy) Stefano Ianni (Argentina) Cristian Villagrán; 7–6(3), 1–6, [10–6]	(Belgium) Niels Desein (France) Stéphane Robert	(Spain) Albert Ramos Viñolas (Spain) Guillermo Olaso	(France) Thierry Ascione (Argentina) Sebastián Decoud (Slovakia) Martin Kližan (Czech Republic) Jaroslav Pospíšil
July 6	2009 Oberstaufen Cup; Oberstaufen, Germany; Regular series Clay (red) – €30,000+H – 32S/14Q/16D; Singles – Doubles	(Czech Republic) Robin Vik; 6–1, 6–2	(Czech Republic) Jan Minář	(Austria) Stefan Koubek (Brazil) João Souza	(Brazil) Rogério Dutra Silva (Germany) Denis Gremelmayr (Germany) Marcel Zimmermann (Germany) Alexander Flock
July 6	2009 Oberstaufen Cup; Oberstaufen, Germany; Regular series Clay (red) – €30,000+H – 32S/14Q/16D; Singles – Doubles	(Germany) Dieter Kindlmann (Germany) Marcel Zimmermann; 6–4, 2–6, [10–4]	(Germany) Michael Berrer (Austria) Philipp Oswald	(Austria) Stefan Koubek (Brazil) João Souza	(Brazil) Rogério Dutra Silva (Germany) Denis Gremelmayr (Germany) Marcel Zimmermann (Germany) Alexander Flock
July 13	2009 Seguros Bolívar Open Bogotá; Bogotá, Colombia; Regular series Clay (red) – $125,000+H – 32S/32Q/16D; Singles – Doubles	(Brazil) Marcos Daniel; 4–6, 7–6(5), 6–4	(Argentina) Horacio Zeballos	(Argentina) Sebastián Decoud (Mexico) Santiago González	(Chile) Nicolás Massú (Colombia) Santiago Giraldo (Brazil) Ricardo Hocevar (Argentina) Brian Dabul
July 13	2009 Seguros Bolívar Open Bogotá; Bogotá, Colombia; Regular series Clay (red) – $125,000+H – 32S/32Q/16D; Singles – Doubles	(Argentina) Sebastián Prieto (Argentina) Horacio Zeballos; 6–4, 7–5	(Brazil) Marcos Daniel (Brazil) Ricardo Mello	(Argentina) Sebastián Decoud (Mexico) Santiago González	(Chile) Nicolás Massú (Colombia) Santiago Giraldo (Brazil) Ricardo Hocevar (Argentina) Brian Dabul
July 13	2009 Comerica Bank Challenger; Aptos, United States; Regular series Hard – $75,000 – 32S/32Q/16D; Singles – Doubles	(Australia) Chris Guccione; 6–3, 6–4	(Australia) Nick Lindahl	(United States) Michael Yani (India) Somdev Devvarman	(South Korea) Im Kyu-tae (Australia) Marinko Matosevic (United States) Wayne Odesnik (South Africa) Izak van der Merwe
July 13	2009 Comerica Bank Challenger; Aptos, United States; Regular series Hard – $75,000 – 32S/32Q/16D; Singles – Doubles	(Australia) Carsten Ball (Australia) Chris Guccione; 6–3, 6–2	(Thailand) Sanchai Ratiwatana (Thailand) Sonchat Ratiwatana	(United States) Michael Yani (India) Somdev Devvarman	(South Korea) Im Kyu-tae (Australia) Marinko Matosevic (United States) Wayne Odesnik (South Africa) Izak van der Merwe
July 13	2009 Riviera di Rimini Challenger; Rimini, Italy; Regular series Clay (red) – €42,500+H – 32S/32Q/16D; Singles – Doubles	(Brazil) Thomaz Bellucci; 3–6, 6–3, 6–1	(Argentina) Juan Pablo Brzezicki	(Germany) Dieter Kindlmann (Argentina) Juan Ignacio Chela	(Germany) Julian Reister (Czech Republic) Jiří Vaněk (Italy) Filippo Volandri (France) Stéphane Robert
July 13	2009 Riviera di Rimini Challenger; Rimini, Italy; Regular series Clay (red) – €42,500+H – 32S/32Q/16D; Singles – Doubles	(Germany) Matthias Bachinger (Germany) Dieter Kindlmann; 6–4, 6–2	(Italy) Leonardo Azzaro (Italy) Marco Crugnola	(Germany) Dieter Kindlmann (Argentina) Juan Ignacio Chela	(Germany) Julian Reister (Czech Republic) Jiří Vaněk (Italy) Filippo Volandri (France) Stéphane Robert
July 13	2009 Manchester Trophy; Manchester, United Kingdom; Regular series Grass – €30,000+H – 32S/13Q/16D/2Q; Singles – Doubles	(Belgium) Olivier Rochus; 6–3, 4–6, 6–2	(Netherlands) Igor Sijsling	(United Kingdom) Alex Bogdanovic (France) Nicolas Mahut	(Turkey) Marsel İlhan (Slovakia) Karol Beck (Slovakia) Lukáš Lacko (Austria) Martin Fischer
July 13	2009 Manchester Trophy; Manchester, United Kingdom; Regular series Grass – €30,000+H – 32S/13Q/16D/2Q; Singles – Doubles	(United Kingdom) Josh Goodall (United Kingdom) Jonathan Marray; 6–7(1), 6–3, [11–9]	(United Kingdom) Colin Fleming (United Kingdom) Ken Skupski	(United Kingdom) Alex Bogdanovic (France) Nicolas Mahut	(Turkey) Marsel İlhan (Slovakia) Karol Beck (Slovakia) Lukáš Lacko (Austria) Martin Fischer
July 20	2009 Poznań Porsche Open; Poznań, Poland; Tretorn SERIE+ Clay (red) – €64,000+H – 32S/32Q/16D; Singles – Doubles	(Australia) Peter Luczak; 3–6, 7–6(4), 7–6(6)	(Kazakhstan) Yuri Schukin	(Poland) Jerzy Janowicz (Ukraine) Alexandr Dolgopolov	(Sweden) Björn Rehnquist (France) Laurent Recouderc (Croatia) Antonio Veić (Germany) Denis Gremelmayr
July 20	2009 Poznań Porsche Open; Poznań, Poland; Tretorn SERIE+ Clay (red) – €64,000+H – 32S/32Q/16D; Singles – Doubles	(Argentina) Sergio Roitman (France) Alexandre Sidorenko; 6–4, 6–4	(Germany) Michael Kohlmann (Netherlands) Rogier Wassen	(Poland) Jerzy Janowicz (Ukraine) Alexandr Dolgopolov	(Sweden) Björn Rehnquist (France) Laurent Recouderc (Croatia) Antonio Veić (Germany) Denis Gremelmayr
July 20	2009 Fifth Third Bank Tennis Championships; Lexington, United States; Regular series Hard – $50,000 – 32S/22Q/16D/4Q; Singles – Doubles	(Israel) Harel Levy; 6–4, 4–6, 6–2	(United States) Alex Kuznetsov	(United Kingdom) Dan Evans (Australia) Marinko Matosevic	(South Korea) Im Kyu-tae (United States) Tim Smyczek (Germany) Tobias Kamke (United Kingdom) Alex Bogdanovic
July 20	2009 Fifth Third Bank Tennis Championships; Lexington, United States; Regular series Hard – $50,000 – 32S/22Q/16D/4Q; Singles – Doubles	(South Africa) Kevin Anderson (United States) Ryler DeHeart; 6–4, 4–6, [10–6]	(Israel) Amir Hadad (Israel) Harel Levy	(United Kingdom) Dan Evans (Australia) Marinko Matosevic	(South Korea) Im Kyu-tae (United States) Tim Smyczek (Germany) Tobias Kamke (United Kingdom) Alex Bogdanovic
July 20	2009 Penza Cup; Penza, Russia; Regular series Hard – $50,000 – 32S/31Q/16D/4Q; Singles – Doubles	(Kazakhstan) Mikhail Kukushkin; 6–4, 6–2	(Ukraine) Illya Marchenko	(Australia) Greg Jones (Spain) Íñigo Cervantes	(Russia) Mikhail Elgin (Russia) Mikhail Ledovskikh (Russia) Alexander Kudryavtsev (Netherlands) Matwé Middelkoop
July 20	2009 Penza Cup; Penza, Russia; Regular series Hard – $50,000 – 32S/31Q/16D/4Q; Singles – Doubles	(Russia) Mikhail Elgin (Russia) Alexander Kudryavtsev; 4–6, 6–3, [10–6]	(Kazakhstan) Alexey Kedryuk (Russia) Denis Matsukevich	(Australia) Greg Jones (Spain) Íñigo Cervantes	(Russia) Mikhail Elgin (Russia) Mikhail Ledovskikh (Russia) Alexander Kudryavtsev (Netherlands) Matwé Middelkoop
July 20	2009 Manta Open; Manta, Ecuador; Regular series Hard – $35,000+H – 32S/23Q/15D; Singles – Doubles	(Argentina) Horacio Zeballos; 3–6, 7–5, 6–3	(France) Vincent Millot	(Brazil) Ricardo Hocevar (Ecuador) Giovanni Lapentti	(Spain) Fernando Vicente (Argentina) Mariano Zabaleta (Mexico) Santiago González (Mexico) Bruno Echagaray
July 20	2009 Manta Open; Manta, Ecuador; Regular series Hard – $35,000+H – 32S/23Q/15D; Singles – Doubles	(Brazil) Ricardo Hocevar (Brazil) André Miele; 6–1, 2–6, [10–7]	(Mexico) Santiago González (Argentina) Horacio Zeballos	(Brazil) Ricardo Hocevar (Ecuador) Giovanni Lapentti	(Spain) Fernando Vicente (Argentina) Mariano Zabaleta (Mexico) Santiago González (Mexico) Bruno Echagaray
July 20	2009 Guzzini Challenger; Recanati, Italy; Regular series Hard – €30,000+H – 32S/29Q/16D; Singles – Doubles	(Switzerland) Stéphane Bohli; 6–4, 7–6(4)	(Kazakhstan) Andrey Golubev	(Italy) Daniele Bracciali (Slovakia) Lukáš Lacko	(Italy) Paolo Lorenzi (Denmark) Frederik Nielsen (Austria) Martin Fischer (Ukraine) Sergiy Stakhovsky
July 20	2009 Guzzini Challenger; Recanati, Italy; Regular series Hard – €30,000+H – 32S/29Q/16D; Singles – Doubles	(Denmark) Frederik Nielsen (Australia) Joseph Sirianni; 6–4, 3–6, [10–6]	(Italy) Adriano Biasella (Kazakhstan) Andrey Golubev	(Italy) Daniele Bracciali (Slovakia) Lukáš Lacko	(Italy) Paolo Lorenzi (Denmark) Frederik Nielsen (Austria) Martin Fischer (Ukraine) Sergiy Stakhovsky
July 27	2009 Trofeo Bellaveglia; Orbetello, Italy; Regular series Clay (red) – €85,000+H – 32S/15Q/16D; Singles – Doubles	(Ukraine) Alexandr Dolgopolov; 6–4, 6–2	(Spain) Pablo Andújar	(Republic of Ireland) Louk Sorensen (Algeria) Lamine Ouahab	(Serbia) Boris Pašanski (Italy) Paolo Lorenzi (Argentina) Juan Pablo Brzezicki (Portugal) Rui Machado
July 27	2009 Trofeo Bellaveglia; Orbetello, Italy; Regular series Clay (red) – €85,000+H – 32S/15Q/16D; Singles – Doubles	(Italy) Paolo Lorenzi (Italy) Giancarlo Petrazzuolo; 7–6(5), 3–6, [10–6]	(Italy) Alessio di Mauro (Italy) Manuel Jorquera	(Republic of Ireland) Louk Sorensen (Algeria) Lamine Ouahab	(Serbia) Boris Pašanski (Italy) Paolo Lorenzi (Argentina) Juan Pablo Brzezicki (Portugal) Rui Machado
July 27	2009 Challenger Banque Nationale de Granby; Granby, Canada; Regular series Hard – $50,000+H – 32S/18Q/16D; Singles – Doubles	(Belgium) Xavier Malisse; 6–4, 6–4	(South Africa) Kevin Anderson	(Canada) Peter Polansky (United States) Ryler DeHeart	(United States) Lester Cook (Canada) Frédéric Niemeyer (United States) Jesse Witten (South Korea) Im Kyu-tae
July 27	2009 Challenger Banque Nationale de Granby; Granby, Canada; Regular series Hard – $50,000+H – 32S/18Q/16D; Singles – Doubles	(United Kingdom) Colin Fleming (United Kingdom) Ken Skupski; 6–3, 7–6(6)	(Israel) Amir Hadad (Israel) Harel Levy	(Canada) Peter Polansky (United States) Ryler DeHeart	(United States) Lester Cook (Canada) Frédéric Niemeyer (United States) Jesse Witten (South Korea) Im Kyu-tae
July 27	2009 Mordovia Cup; Saransk, Russia; Regular series Clay (red) – $50,000 – 32S/32Q/16D; Singles – Doubles	(Spain) Íñigo Cervantes; 7–5, 6–4	(France) Jonathan Dasnières de Veigy	(Russia) Mikhail Elgin (Spain) Guillermo Olaso	(Ukraine) Denys Molchanov (Ukraine) Illya Marchenko (Russia) Mikhail Ledovskikh (Republic of Ireland) Conor Niland
July 27	2009 Mordovia Cup; Saransk, Russia; Regular series Clay (red) – $50,000 – 32S/32Q/16D; Singles – Doubles	(Russia) Mikhail Elgin (Russia) Evgeny Kirillov; 6–1, 6–2	(Kazakhstan) Alexey Kedryuk (Russia) Denis Matsukevich	(Russia) Mikhail Elgin (Spain) Guillermo Olaso	(Ukraine) Denys Molchanov (Ukraine) Illya Marchenko (Russia) Mikhail Ledovskikh (Republic of Ireland) Conor Niland
July 27	2009 Tampere Open; Tampere, Finland; Regular series Clay (red) – €42,500 – 32S/32Q/16D; Singles – Doubles	(Netherlands) Thiemo de Bakker; 6–4, 7–6(7)	(Australia) Peter Luczak	(Italy) Alberto Brizzi (Germany) Florian Mayer	(Germany) Matthias Bachinger (Austria) Andreas Haider-Maurer (Finland) Henri Kontinen (Kazakhstan) Yuri Schukin
July 27	2009 Tampere Open; Tampere, Finland; Regular series Clay (red) – €42,500 – 32S/32Q/16D; Singles – Doubles	(Australia) Peter Luczak (Kazakhstan) Yuri Schukin; 6–1, 6(6)–7, [10–4]	(Italy) Simone Vagnozzi (Italy) Uros Vico	(Italy) Alberto Brizzi (Germany) Florian Mayer	(Germany) Matthias Bachinger (Austria) Andreas Haider-Maurer (Finland) Henri Kontinen (Kazakhstan) Yuri Schukin
July 27	2009 BH Tennis Open International Cup; Belo Horizonte, Brazil; Regular series Hard – $35,000+H – 32S/25Q/16D; Singles – Doubles	(Brazil) Júlio Silva; 4–6, 6–3, 6–4	(Argentina) Eduardo Schwank	(Spain) Guillermo Alcaide (Brazil) Caio Zampieri	(Brazil) Thiago Alves (Denmark) Kristian Pless (Brazil) Ricardo Hocevar (France) David Guez
July 27	2009 BH Tennis Open International Cup; Belo Horizonte, Brazil; Regular series Hard – $35,000+H – 32S/25Q/16D; Singles – Doubles	(Brazil) Márcio Torres (South Africa) Izak van der Merwe walkover	(Argentina) Juan Pablo Amado (Argentina) Eduardo Schwank	(Spain) Guillermo Alcaide (Brazil) Caio Zampieri	(Brazil) Thiago Alves (Denmark) Kristian Pless (Brazil) Ricardo Hocevar (France) David Guez

=== August ===
Week of	Tournament	Champions	Runners-up	Semifinalists	Quarterfinalists
August 3	2009 Open Castilla y León; Segovia, Spain; Tretorn SERIE+ Hard – €106,500+H – 32S/29Q/16D; Singles – Doubles	(Spain) Feliciano López; 6–3, 6–4	(France) Adrian Mannarino	(France) Nicolas Mahut (Spain) Marcel Granollers	(Spain) Iván Navarro (France) Édouard Roger-Vasselin (Bulgaria) Grigor Dimitrov (Spain) Roberto Bautista Agut
August 3	2009 Open Castilla y León; Segovia, Spain; Tretorn SERIE+ Hard – €106,500+H – 32S/29Q/16D; Singles – Doubles	(France) Nicolas Mahut (France) Édouard Roger-Vasselin; 6–7(4), 6–3, [10–8]	(Ukraine) Sergiy Stakhovsky (Croatia) Lovro Zovko	(France) Nicolas Mahut (Spain) Marcel Granollers	(Spain) Iván Navarro (France) Édouard Roger-Vasselin (Bulgaria) Grigor Dimitrov (Spain) Roberto Bautista Agut
August 3	2009 Odlum Brown Vancouver Open; Vancouver, Canada; Regular series Hard – $100,000 – 32S/17Q/16D/3Q; Singles – Doubles	(Cyprus) Marcos Baghdatis; 6–4, 6–4	(Belgium) Xavier Malisse	(United Kingdom) Alex Bogdanovic (United States) Tim Smyczek	(Ukraine) Sergei Bubka (Canada) Philip Bester (United States) Lester Cook (United States) Taylor Dent
August 3	2009 Odlum Brown Vancouver Open; Vancouver, Canada; Regular series Hard – $100,000 – 32S/17Q/16D/3Q; Singles – Doubles	(South Africa) Kevin Anderson (South Africa) Rik de Voest; 6–4, 6–4	(Paraguay) Ramón Delgado (United States) Kaes Van't Hof	(United Kingdom) Alex Bogdanovic (United States) Tim Smyczek	(Ukraine) Sergei Bubka (Canada) Philip Bester (United States) Lester Cook (United States) Taylor Dent
August 3	2009 San Marino CEPU Open; City of San Marino, San Marino; Tretorn SERIE+ Clay (red) – €85,000+H – 32S/24Q/16D; Singles – Doubles	(Italy) Andreas Seppi; 7–6(4), 2–6, 6–4	(Italy) Potito Starace	(Austria) Daniel Köllerer (Ukraine) Alexandr Dolgopolov	(Argentina) Sergio Roitman (Portugal) Rui Machado (Australia) Peter Luczak (Spain) Pere Riba
August 3	2009 San Marino CEPU Open; City of San Marino, San Marino; Tretorn SERIE+ Clay (red) – €85,000+H – 32S/24Q/16D; Singles – Doubles	(Argentina) Lucas Arnold Ker (Argentina) Sebastián Prieto; 7–6(4), 2–6, [10–7]	(Sweden) Johan Brunström (Netherlands Antilles) Jean-Julien Rojer	(Austria) Daniel Köllerer (Ukraine) Alexandr Dolgopolov	(Argentina) Sergio Roitman (Portugal) Rui Machado (Australia) Peter Luczak (Spain) Pere Riba
August 3	2009 Credicard Citi MasterCard Tennis Cup; Campos do Jordão, Brazil; Regular series Hard – $50,000+H – 32S/32Q/16D; Singles – Doubles	(Argentina) Horacio Zeballos; 6–7(4), 6–4, 6–3	(Brazil) Thiago Alves	(Brazil) Marcelo Demoliner (Argentina) Juan Ignacio Chela	(South Africa) Raven Klaasen (Brazil) Ricardo Mello (Brazil) Caio Zampieri (France) David Guez
August 3	2009 Credicard Citi MasterCard Tennis Cup; Campos do Jordão, Brazil; Regular series Hard – $50,000+H – 32S/32Q/16D; Singles – Doubles	(United Kingdom) Josh Goodall (Australia) Sam Groth; 7–6(4), 6–3	(Brazil) Rogério Dutra Silva (Brazil) Júlio Silva	(Brazil) Marcelo Demoliner (Argentina) Juan Ignacio Chela	(South Africa) Raven Klaasen (Brazil) Ricardo Mello (Brazil) Caio Zampieri (France) David Guez
August 10	2009 Zucchetti Kos Tennis Cup; Cordenons, Italy; Tretorn SERIE+ Clay (red) – €85,000+H – 32S/19Q/16D; Singles – Doubles	(Australia) Peter Luczak; 6–3, 3–6, 6–1	(Belgium) Olivier Rochus	(Italy) Filippo Volandri (Belgium) Christophe Rochus	(Argentina) Brian Dabul (Romania) Victor Crivoi (Austria) Daniel Köllerer (Spain) Óscar Hernández
August 10	2009 Zucchetti Kos Tennis Cup; Cordenons, Italy; Tretorn SERIE+ Clay (red) – €85,000+H – 32S/19Q/16D; Singles – Doubles	(United States) James Cerretani (United States) Travis Rettenmaier; 4–6, 6–3, [11–9]	(Australia) Peter Luczak (Italy) Alessandro Motti	(Italy) Filippo Volandri (Belgium) Christophe Rochus	(Argentina) Brian Dabul (Romania) Victor Crivoi (Austria) Daniel Köllerer (Spain) Óscar Hernández
August 10	2009 LG&T Tennis Challenger; Binghamton, United States; Regular series Hard – $50,000 – 32S/28Q/16D/4Q; Singles – Doubles	(Chile) Paul Capdeville; 7–6(7), 7–6(11)	(South Africa) Kevin Anderson	(Israel) Harel Levy (South Africa) Rik de Voest	(Uzbekistan) Denis Istomin (United States) Lester Cook (Armenia) Tigran Martirosyan (Ukraine) Sergei Bubka
August 10	2009 LG&T Tennis Challenger; Binghamton, United States; Regular series Hard – $50,000 – 32S/28Q/16D/4Q; Singles – Doubles	(South Africa) Rik de Voest (United States) Scott Lipsky; 7–6(2), 6–4	(Australia) Carsten Ball (United States) Kaes Van't Hof	(Israel) Harel Levy (South Africa) Rik de Voest	(Uzbekistan) Denis Istomin (United States) Lester Cook (Armenia) Tigran Martirosyan (Ukraine) Sergei Bubka
August 10	2009 American Express – TED Open; Istanbul, Turkey; Regular series Hard – $50,000 – 32S/16Q/16D; Singles – Doubles	(Ukraine) Illya Marchenko; 6–4, 6–4	(Germany) Florian Mayer	(Portugal) Fred Gil (Slovakia) Karol Beck	(Kazakhstan) Mikhail Kukushkin (Turkey) Marsel İlhan (France) Stéphane Robert (Austria) Martin Fischer
August 10	2009 American Express – TED Open; Istanbul, Turkey; Regular series Hard – $50,000 – 32S/16Q/16D; Singles – Doubles	(Portugal) Fred Gil (Sweden) Filip Prpic; 3–6, 6–2, [10–6]	(Bulgaria) Grigor Dimitrov (Turkey) Marsel İlhan	(Portugal) Fred Gil (Slovakia) Karol Beck	(Kazakhstan) Mikhail Kukushkin (Turkey) Marsel İlhan (France) Stéphane Robert (Austria) Martin Fischer
August 10	2009 Aberto de Brasília; Brasília, Brazil; Regular series Hard – $35,000+H – 32S/28Q/16D; Singles – Doubles	(Brazil) Ricardo Mello; 7–6(2), 6–4	(Argentina) Juan Ignacio Chela	(Chile) Nicolás Massú (Argentina) Horacio Zeballos	(New Zealand) Daniel King-Turner (Ecuador) Giovanni Lapentti (Uruguay) Marcel Felder (Brazil) João Souza
August 10	2009 Aberto de Brasília; Brasília, Brazil; Regular series Hard – $35,000+H – 32S/28Q/16D; Singles – Doubles	(Brazil) Marcelo Demoliner (Brazil) Rodrigo Guidolin; 6–4, 6–2	(Brazil) Ricardo Mello (Brazil) Caio Zampieri	(Chile) Nicolás Massú (Argentina) Horacio Zeballos	(New Zealand) Daniel King-Turner (Ecuador) Giovanni Lapentti (Uruguay) Marcel Felder (Brazil) João Souza
August 10	2009 Samarkand Challenger; Samarkand, Uzbekistan; Regular series Clay (red) – $35,000+H – 32S/32Q/16D; Singles – Doubles	(Jamaica) Dustin Brown; 7–6(3), 6–3	(France) Jonathan Dasnières de Veigy	(Spain) Carles Poch Gradin (Russia) Evgeny Kirillov	(Russia) Valery Rudnev (France) Guillaume Rufin (Belgium) David Goffin (Slovakia) Kamil Čapkovič
August 10	2009 Samarkand Challenger; Samarkand, Uzbekistan; Regular series Clay (red) – $35,000+H – 32S/32Q/16D; Singles – Doubles	(Australia) Kaden Hensel (Australia) Adam Hubble; 7–5, 7–5	(Russia) Valery Rudnev (Ukraine) Ivan Sergeyev	(Spain) Carles Poch Gradin (Russia) Evgeny Kirillov	(Russia) Valery Rudnev (France) Guillaume Rufin (Belgium) David Goffin (Slovakia) Kamil Čapkovič
August 10	2009 Concurso Int'l de Tenis – Vigo; Vigo, Spain; Regular series Clay (red) – €30,000+H – 32S/30Q/16D; Singles – Doubles	(Netherlands) Thiemo de Bakker; 6–4, 4–6, 6–2	(France) Thierry Ascione	(Spain) Pablo Andújar (Argentina) Martín Alund	(Spain) Marcel Granollers (Spain) Iván Navarro (Spain) Santiago Ventura (Spain) Rubén Ramírez Hidalgo
August 10	2009 Concurso Int'l de Tenis – Vigo; Vigo, Spain; Regular series Clay (red) – €30,000+H – 32S/30Q/16D; Singles – Doubles	(Netherlands) Thiemo de Bakker (Netherlands) Raemon Sluiter; 7–5, 6–2	(Spain) Pedro Clar-Rosselló (Spain) Albert Ramos Viñolas	(Spain) Pablo Andújar (Argentina) Martín Alund	(Spain) Marcel Granollers (Spain) Iván Navarro (Spain) Santiago Ventura (Spain) Rubén Ramírez Hidalgo
August 17	2009 Trani Cup; Trani, Italy; Regular series Clay (red) – €42,500+H – 32S/16Q/16D; Singles – Doubles	(Austria) Daniel Köllerer; 6–3, 7–5	(Italy) Filippo Volandri	(Italy) Daniele Bracciali (Germany) Simon Greul	(Italy) Enrico Burzi (Italy) Simone Vagnozzi (Italy) Marco Crugnola (Peru) Luis Horna
August 17	2009 Trani Cup; Trani, Italy; Regular series Clay (red) – €42,500+H – 32S/16Q/16D; Singles – Doubles	(United Kingdom) Jamie Delgado (United Kingdom) Jamie Murray; 3–6, 6–4, [12–10]	(Germany) Simon Greul (Italy) Alessandro Motti	(Italy) Daniele Bracciali (Germany) Simon Greul	(Italy) Enrico Burzi (Italy) Simone Vagnozzi (Italy) Marco Crugnola (Peru) Luis Horna
August 17	2009 Karshi Challenger; Qarshi, Uzbekistan; Regular series Hard – $35,000+H – 32S/32Q/16D; Singles – Doubles	(Austria) Rainer Eitzinger; 6–3, 1–6, 7–6(3)	(Ukraine) Ivan Sergeyev	(Spain) Carles Poch Gradin (Lithuania) Ričardas Berankis	(Australia) Greg Jones (Serbia) Nikola Ćirić (Jamaica) Dustin Brown (Australia) Sadik Kadir
August 17	2009 Karshi Challenger; Qarshi, Uzbekistan; Regular series Hard – $35,000+H – 32S/32Q/16D; Singles – Doubles	(Australia) Sadik Kadir (India) Purav Raja; 6–3, 7–6(4)	(Latvia) Andis Juška (Latvia) Deniss Pavlovs	(Spain) Carles Poch Gradin (Lithuania) Ričardas Berankis	(Australia) Greg Jones (Serbia) Nikola Ćirić (Jamaica) Dustin Brown (Australia) Sadik Kadir
August 17	2009 Concurso Int'l de Tenis – San Sebastián; San Sebastián, Spain; Regular series Clay (red) – €30,000+H – 32S/21Q/16D; Singles – Doubles	(Netherlands) Thiemo de Bakker; 6–2, 6–3	(Serbia) Filip Krajinović	(France) Olivier Patience (Spain) Pedro Clar-Rosselló	(Spain) David Marrero (Spain) Albert Ramos Viñolas (Spain) Pablo Andújar (Spain) José Checa Calvo
August 17	2009 Concurso Int'l de Tenis – San Sebastián; San Sebastián, Spain; Regular series Clay (red) – €30,000+H – 32S/21Q/16D; Singles – Doubles	(France) Jonathan Eysseric (France) Romain Jouan; 7–5, 6–3	(Spain) Pedro Clar-Rosselló (Spain) Albert Ramos Viñolas	(France) Olivier Patience (Spain) Pedro Clar-Rosselló	(Spain) David Marrero (Spain) Albert Ramos Viñolas (Spain) Pablo Andújar (Spain) José Checa Calvo
August 17	2009 IPP Trophy; Geneva, Switzerland; Regular series Clay (red) – €30,000+H – 32S/18Q/16D; Singles – Doubles	(Germany) Dominik Meffert; 6–3, 6–1	(Monaco) Benjamin Balleret	(Austria) Philipp Oswald (Kazakhstan) Yuri Schukin	(Czech Republic) Robin Vik (Russia) Evgeny Donskoy (Argentina) Diego Álvarez (Czech Republic) Jan Hájek
August 17	2009 IPP Trophy; Geneva, Switzerland; Regular series Clay (red) – €30,000+H – 32S/18Q/16D; Singles – Doubles	(Argentina) Diego Álvarez (Argentina) Juan-Martín Aranguren; 6–4, 4–6, [10–2]	(Finland) Henri Laaksonen (Austria) Philipp Oswald	(Austria) Philipp Oswald (Kazakhstan) Yuri Schukin	(Czech Republic) Robin Vik (Russia) Evgeny Donskoy (Argentina) Diego Álvarez (Czech Republic) Jan Hájek
August 24	2009 Savoldi–Cò – Trofeo Dimmidisì; Manerbio, Italy; Regular series Clay (red) – €64,000+H – 32S/32Q/16D; Singles – Doubles	(Argentina) Federico Delbonis; 6–1, 6–3	(Portugal) Leonardo Tavares	(Monaco) Benjamin Balleret (Czech Republic) Jiří Vaněk	(Argentina) Martín Alund (Italy) Daniele Giorgini (Argentina) Eduardo Schwank (Argentina) Carlos Berlocq
August 24	2009 Savoldi–Cò – Trofeo Dimmidisì; Manerbio, Italy; Regular series Clay (red) – €64,000+H – 32S/32Q/16D; Singles – Doubles	(Italy) Alessio di Mauro (Italy) Simone Vagnozzi; 6–4, 3–6, [10–4]	(Switzerland) Yves Allegro (Netherlands) Jesse Huta Galung	(Monaco) Benjamin Balleret (Czech Republic) Jiří Vaněk	(Argentina) Martín Alund (Italy) Daniele Giorgini (Argentina) Eduardo Schwank (Argentina) Carlos Berlocq
August 24	2009 Almaty Cup; Almaty, Kazakhstan; Regular series Hard – $50,000 – 32S/20Q/16D; Singles – Doubles	(Ukraine) Ivan Sergeyev; 6–3, 5–7, 6–4	(Jamaica) Dustin Brown	(Canada) Pierre-Ludovic Duclos (Russia) Ilya Belyaev	(Australia) Greg Jones (Russia) Konstantin Kravchuk (Russia) Mikhail Ledovskikh (Latvia) Andis Juška
August 24	2009 Almaty Cup; Almaty, Kazakhstan; Regular series Hard – $50,000 – 32S/20Q/16D; Singles – Doubles	(Ukraine) Denys Molchanov (Chinese Taipei) Yang Tsung-hua; 4–6, 7–6(5), [11–9]	(Canada) Pierre-Ludovic Duclos (Kazakhstan) Alexey Kedryuk	(Canada) Pierre-Ludovic Duclos (Russia) Ilya Belyaev	(Australia) Greg Jones (Russia) Konstantin Kravchuk (Russia) Mikhail Ledovskikh (Latvia) Andis Juška
August 31	2009 Black Forest Open; Freudenstadt, Germany; Regular series Clay (red) – €35,000+H – 32S/18Q/16D; Singles – Doubles	(Czech Republic) Jan Hájek; 2–6, 6–3, 7–6(5)	(France) Laurent Recouderc	(Germany) Florian Mayer (Germany) Daniel Brands	(Germany) Nils Langer (France) Jonathan Dasnières de Veigy (Australia) Joseph Sirianni (United Kingdom) James Ward
August 31	2009 Black Forest Open; Freudenstadt, Germany; Regular series Clay (red) – €35,000+H – 32S/18Q/16D; Singles – Doubles	(Czech Republic) Jan Hájek (Czech Republic) Dušan Karol; 4–6, 6–4, [10–5]	(Slovakia) Martin Kližan (Canada) Adil Shamasdin	(Germany) Florian Mayer (Germany) Daniel Brands	(Germany) Nils Langer (France) Jonathan Dasnières de Veigy (Australia) Joseph Sirianni (United Kingdom) James Ward
August 31	2009 Brașov Challenger; Brașov, Romania; Regular series Clay (red) – €30,000+H – 32S/19Q/15D; Singles – Doubles	(Netherlands) Thiemo de Bakker; 7–5, 6–0	(Spain) Pere Riba	(Italy) Francesco Aldi (Romania) Adrian Ungur	(Spain) Sergio Gutiérrez Ferrol (Ukraine) Artem Smirnov (Czech Republic) Dušan Lojda (Spain) Pablo Santos
August 31	2009 Brașov Challenger; Brașov, Romania; Regular series Clay (red) – €30,000+H – 32S/19Q/15D; Singles – Doubles	(Spain) Pere Riba (Spain) Pablo Santos; 6–3, 6–2	(Italy) Simone Vagnozzi (Italy) Uros Vico	(Italy) Francesco Aldi (Romania) Adrian Ungur	(Spain) Sergio Gutiérrez Ferrol (Ukraine) Artem Smirnov (Czech Republic) Dušan Lojda (Spain) Pablo Santos
August 31	2009 Città di Como Challenger; Como, Italy; Regular series Clay (red) – €30,000+H – 32S/22Q/16D; Singles – Doubles	(Ukraine) Alexandr Dolgopolov; 7–5, 7–6(5)	(Argentina) Juan-Martín Aranguren	(Italy) Paolo Lorenzi (France) Olivier Patience	(Italy) Marco Crugnola (Italy) Filippo Volandri (Argentina) Carlos Berlocq (Italy) Tomas Tenconi
August 31	2009 Città di Como Challenger; Como, Italy; Regular series Clay (red) – €30,000+H – 32S/22Q/16D; Singles – Doubles	(Italy) Marco Crugnola (Italy) Alessandro Motti; 7–6(3), 6–2	(Philippines) Treat Huey (India) Harsh Mankad	(Italy) Paolo Lorenzi (France) Olivier Patience	(Italy) Marco Crugnola (Italy) Filippo Volandri (Argentina) Carlos Berlocq (Italy) Tomas Tenconi

=== September ===
Week of	Tournament	Champions	Runners-up	Semifinalists	Quarterfinalists
September 7	2009 AON Open Challenger; Genoa, Italy; Regular series Clay (red) – €85,000+H – 32S/27Q/16D; Singles – Doubles	(Spain) Alberto Martín; 6–3, 6–3	(Argentina) Carlos Berlocq	(Belgium) Steve Darcis (Germany) Simon Greul	(Argentina) Juan-Martín Aranguren (Kazakhstan) Evgeny Korolev (Israel) Harel Levy (Germany) Daniel Brands
September 7	2009 AON Open Challenger; Genoa, Italy; Regular series Clay (red) – €85,000+H – 32S/27Q/16D; Singles – Doubles	(Italy) Daniele Bracciali (Italy) Alessandro Motti; 6–4, 6–2	(Israel) Amir Hadad (Israel) Harel Levy	(Belgium) Steve Darcis (Germany) Simon Greul	(Argentina) Juan-Martín Aranguren (Kazakhstan) Evgeny Korolev (Israel) Harel Levy (Germany) Daniel Brands
September 7	2009 Copa Sevilla; Seville, Spain; Regular series Clay – €42,500+H (Yellow) – 32S/32Q/16D; Singles – Doubles	(Spain) Pere Riba; 7–6(2), 6–2	(Spain) Albert Ramos Viñolas	(Spain) Santiago Ventura (Brazil) Júlio Silva	(Spain) Daniel Gimeno Traver (Italy) Simone Vagnozzi (Spain) Pablo Santos (Spain) Agustín Boje-Ordóñez
September 7	2009 Copa Sevilla; Seville, Spain; Regular series Clay – €42,500+H (Yellow) – 32S/32Q/16D; Singles – Doubles	(Philippines) Treat Huey (India) Harsh Mankad; 6–1, 7–5	(Italy) Alberto Brizzi (Italy) Simone Vagnozzi	(Spain) Santiago Ventura (Brazil) Júlio Silva	(Spain) Daniel Gimeno Traver (Italy) Simone Vagnozzi (Spain) Pablo Santos (Spain) Agustín Boje-Ordóñez
September 7	2009 TEAN International; Alphen aan den Rijn, Netherlands; Regular series Clay (red) – €42,500 – 32S/31Q/16D; Singles – Doubles	(France) Stéphane Robert; 7–6(2), 5–7, 7–6(5)	(United States) Michael Russell	(Netherlands) Raemon Sluiter (Netherlands) Thiemo de Bakker	(Germany) Julian Reister (Italy) Andrea Arnaboldi (Germany) Matthias Bachinger (Netherlands) Matwé Middelkoop
September 7	2009 TEAN International; Alphen aan den Rijn, Netherlands; Regular series Clay (red) – €42,500 – 32S/31Q/16D; Singles – Doubles	(United Kingdom) Jonathan Marray (United Kingdom) Jamie Murray; 6–1, 6–4	(Ukraine) Sergei Bubka (Ukraine) Sergiy Stakhovsky	(Netherlands) Raemon Sluiter (Netherlands) Thiemo de Bakker	(Germany) Julian Reister (Italy) Andrea Arnaboldi (Germany) Matthias Bachinger (Netherlands) Matwé Middelkoop
September 7	2009 Trophée des Alpilles; Saint-Rémy-de-Provence, France; Regular series Hard – €42,500 – 32S/14Q/16D; Singles – Doubles	(Cyprus) Marcos Baghdatis; 6–4, 6–1	(Belgium) Xavier Malisse	(Germany) Björn Phau (Slovakia) Lukáš Lacko	(France) Sébastien de Chaunac (Switzerland) Stéphane Bohli (France) Nicolas Mahut (France) David Guez
September 7	2009 Trophée des Alpilles; Saint-Rémy-de-Provence, France; Regular series Hard – €42,500 – 32S/14Q/16D; Singles – Doubles	(Czech Republic) Jiří Krkoška (Slovakia) Lukáš Lacko; 6–1, 3–6, [10–3]	(Belgium) Ruben Bemelmans (Belgium) Niels Desein	(Germany) Björn Phau (Slovakia) Lukáš Lacko	(France) Sébastien de Chaunac (Switzerland) Stéphane Bohli (France) Nicolas Mahut (France) David Guez
September 14	2009 Pekao Open; Szczecin, Poland; Tretorn SERIE+ Clay (red) – €106,500+H – 32S/31Q/16D; Singles – Doubles	(Kazakhstan) Evgeny Korolev; 6–4, 6–3	(France) Florent Serra	(Spain) Albert Montañés (Spain) Óscar Hernández	(Germany) Daniel Brands (Kazakhstan) Yuri Schukin (Germany) Florian Mayer (Spain) Santiago Ventura
September 14	2009 Pekao Open; Szczecin, Poland; Tretorn SERIE+ Clay (red) – €106,500+H – 32S/31Q/16D; Singles – Doubles	(Poland) Tomasz Bednarek (Poland) Mateusz Kowalczyk; 6–3, 6–4	(Ukraine) Alexandr Dolgopolov (Ukraine) Artem Smirnov	(Spain) Albert Montañés (Spain) Óscar Hernández	(Germany) Daniel Brands (Kazakhstan) Yuri Schukin (Germany) Florian Mayer (Spain) Santiago Ventura
September 14	2009 Seguros Bolívar Open Cali; Cali, Colombia; Regular series Clay (red) – $75,000+H – 32S/26Q/16D; Singles – Doubles	(Colombia) Alejandro Falla; 6–3, 6–4	(Argentina) Horacio Zeballos	(Argentina) Juan Ignacio Chela (Colombia) Santiago Giraldo	(Brazil) Ricardo Mello (Colombia) Eduardo Struvay (Spain) Carles Poch Gradin (Colombia) Carlos Salamanca
September 14	2009 Seguros Bolívar Open Cali; Cali, Colombia; Regular series Clay (red) – $75,000+H – 32S/26Q/16D; Singles – Doubles	(Argentina) Sebastián Prieto (Argentina) Horacio Zeballos; 4–6, 6–3, [10–5]	(Brazil) Ricardo Hocevar (Brazil) João Souza	(Argentina) Juan Ignacio Chela (Colombia) Santiago Giraldo	(Brazil) Ricardo Mello (Colombia) Eduardo Struvay (Spain) Carles Poch Gradin (Colombia) Carlos Salamanca
September 14	2009 USTA Challenger of Oklahoma; Tulsa, United States; Regular series Hard – $50,000 – 32S/24Q/16D; Singles – Doubles	(United States) Taylor Dent; 7–6(9), 7–6(4)	(United States) Wayne Odesnik	(Armenia) Tigran Martirosyan (United States) Todd Widom	(United States) Jesse Levine (United States) Ryan Sweeting (Russia) Artem Sitak (Mexico) Daniel Garza
September 14	2009 USTA Challenger of Oklahoma; Tulsa, United States; Regular series Hard – $50,000 – 32S/24Q/16D; Singles – Doubles	(United States) David Martin (United States) Rajeev Ram; 6–2, 6–2	(United Kingdom) Philip Stephens (United Kingdom) Ashley Watling	(Armenia) Tigran Martirosyan (United States) Todd Widom	(United States) Jesse Levine (United States) Ryan Sweeting (Russia) Artem Sitak (Mexico) Daniel Garza
September 14	2009 Internazionali di Tennis dell'Umbria; Todi, Italy; Regular series Clay (red) – €42,500+H – 32S/31Q/16D; Singles – Doubles	(Germany) Simon Greul; 2–6, 6–1, 7–6(6)	(Romania) Adrian Ungur	(Belgium) David Goffin (Italy) Andrea Arnaboldi	(France) Édouard Roger-Vasselin (South Africa) Kevin Anderson (Italy) Paolo Lorenzi (Spain) David Marrero
September 14	2009 Internazionali di Tennis dell'Umbria; Todi, Italy; Regular series Clay (red) – €42,500+H – 32S/31Q/16D; Singles – Doubles	(Austria) Martin Fischer (Austria) Philipp Oswald; 7–5, 6–3	(Spain) Pablo Santos (Spain) Gabriel Trujillo Soler	(Belgium) David Goffin (Italy) Andrea Arnaboldi	(France) Édouard Roger-Vasselin (South Africa) Kevin Anderson (Italy) Paolo Lorenzi (Spain) David Marrero
September 14	2009 Banja Luka Challenger; Banja Luka, Bosnia and Herzegovina; Regular series Clay (red) – €42,500+H – 32S/32Q/16D; Singles – Doubles	(Spain) Daniel Gimeno Traver; 6–4, 6–1	(Germany) Julian Reister	(Germany) Tobias Kamke (Czech Republic) Dušan Lojda	(France) Stéphane Robert (Russia) Valery Rudnev (Netherlands) Matwé Middelkoop (Montenegro) Goran Tošić
September 14	2009 Banja Luka Challenger; Banja Luka, Bosnia and Herzegovina; Regular series Clay (red) – €42,500+H – 32S/32Q/16D; Singles – Doubles	(Jamaica) Dustin Brown (Austria) Rainer Eitzinger; 6–4, 6–3	(Bosnia and Herzegovina) Ismar Gorčić (Italy) Simone Vagnozzi	(Germany) Tobias Kamke (Czech Republic) Dušan Lojda	(France) Stéphane Robert (Russia) Valery Rudnev (Netherlands) Matwé Middelkoop (Montenegro) Goran Tošić
September 21	2009 Copa Petrobras Bogotá; Bogotá, Colombia; Regular series Clay (red) – $75,000+H – 32S/24Q/16D; Singles – Doubles	(Colombia) Carlos Salamanca; 6–1, 7–6(5)	(Italy) Riccardo Ghedin	(Brazil) Caio Zampieri (Brazil) Ricardo Mello	(Colombia) Alejandro González (Germany) Andre Begemann (Ecuador) Giovanni Lapentti (Chile) Paul Capdeville
September 21	2009 Copa Petrobras Bogotá; Bogotá, Colombia; Regular series Clay (red) – $75,000+H – 32S/24Q/16D; Singles – Doubles	(Colombia) Alejandro Falla (Colombia) Alejandro González; 5–7, 6–4, [10–8]	(Argentina) Diego Álvarez (Argentina) Sebastián Decoud	(Brazil) Caio Zampieri (Brazil) Ricardo Mello	(Colombia) Alejandro González (Germany) Andre Begemann (Ecuador) Giovanni Lapentti (Chile) Paul Capdeville
September 21	2009 ATP Challenger Trophy; Trnava, Slovakia; Regular series Clay (red) – €64,000 – 32S/21Q/16D; Singles – Doubles	(Ukraine) Alexandr Dolgopolov; 6–2, 6–2	(Algeria) Lamine Ouahab	(Russia) Teymuraz Gabashvili (Ukraine) Sergiy Stakhovsky	(Slovakia) Dominik Hrbatý (Czech Republic) Jan Hájek (Germany) Tobias Kamke (Slovakia) Marek Semjan
September 21	2009 ATP Challenger Trophy; Trnava, Slovakia; Regular series Clay (red) – €64,000 – 32S/21Q/16D; Singles – Doubles	(Bulgaria) Grigor Dimitrov (Russia) Teymuraz Gabashvili; 6–4, 2–6, [10–8]	(Czech Republic) Jan Minář (Czech Republic) Lukáš Rosol	(Russia) Teymuraz Gabashvili (Ukraine) Sergiy Stakhovsky	(Slovakia) Dominik Hrbatý (Czech Republic) Jan Hájek (Germany) Tobias Kamke (Slovakia) Marek Semjan
September 21	2009 BMW Ljubljana Open; Ljubljana, Slovenia; Regular series Clay (red) – €42,500 – 32S/30Q/16D; Singles – Doubles	(Italy) Paolo Lorenzi; 1–6, 7–6(4), 6–2	(Slovenia) Grega Žemlja	(Slovenia) Janez Semrajc (France) Stéphane Robert	(Serbia) Filip Krajinović (Italy) Enrico Burzi (Italy) Simone Vagnozzi (Croatia) Roko Karanušić
September 21	2009 BMW Ljubljana Open; Ljubljana, Slovenia; Regular series Clay (red) – €42,500 – 32S/30Q/16D; Singles – Doubles	(United Kingdom) Jamie Delgado (United Kingdom) Jamie Murray; 6–3, 6–3	(France) Stéphane Robert (Italy) Simone Vagnozzi	(Slovenia) Janez Semrajc (France) Stéphane Robert	(Serbia) Filip Krajinović (Italy) Enrico Burzi (Italy) Simone Vagnozzi (Croatia) Roko Karanušić
September 21	2009 Sicilia Classic Mancuso Company Cup; Palermo, Italy; Regular series Clay (red) – €30,000+H – 32S/18Q/16D; Singles – Doubles	(Romania) Adrian Ungur; 6–4, 6–4	(Spain) Albert Ramos Viñolas	(Serbia) Nikola Ćirić (Spain) Miguel Ángel López Jaén	(Spain) Guillermo Olaso (Germany) Gero Kretschmer (Spain) Iván Navarro (Spain) Íñigo Cervantes
September 21	2009 Sicilia Classic Mancuso Company Cup; Palermo, Italy; Regular series Clay (red) – €30,000+H – 32S/18Q/16D; Singles – Doubles	(Austria) Martin Fischer (Austria) Philipp Oswald; 6–3, 7–6(4)	(Canada) Pierre-Ludovic Duclos (Brazil) Rogério Dutra Silva	(Serbia) Nikola Ćirić (Spain) Miguel Ángel López Jaén	(Spain) Guillermo Olaso (Germany) Gero Kretschmer (Spain) Iván Navarro (Spain) Íñigo Cervantes
September 28	2009 Copa Petrobras Buenos Aires; Buenos Aires, Argentina; Regular series Clay (red) – $75,000+H – 32S/30Q/16D; Singles – Doubles	(Argentina) Horacio Zeballos; 6–2, 3–6, 6–3	(Argentina) Gastón Gaudio	(Brazil) Júlio Silva (Argentina) Juan Ignacio Chela	(Argentina) Brian Dabul (Spain) Santiago Ventura (Ecuador) Nicolás Lapentti (Argentina) Máximo González
September 28	2009 Copa Petrobras Buenos Aires; Buenos Aires, Argentina; Regular series Clay (red) – $75,000+H – 32S/30Q/16D; Singles – Doubles	(Argentina) Brian Dabul (Argentina) Sergio Roitman; 6–7(4), 6–0, [10–8]	(Argentina) Lucas Arnold Ker (Argentina) Máximo González	(Brazil) Júlio Silva (Argentina) Juan Ignacio Chela	(Argentina) Brian Dabul (Spain) Santiago Ventura (Ecuador) Nicolás Lapentti (Argentina) Máximo González
September 28	2009 Tennislife Cup; Naples, Italy; Regular series Clay (red) – €64,000+H – 32S/22Q/16D; Singles – Doubles	(Portugal) Fred Gil; 2–6, 6–1, 6–4	(Italy) Potito Starace	(Romania) Adrian Ungur (Spain) Óscar Hernández	(Australia) Peter Luczak (Spain) Marcel Granollers (Russia) Teymuraz Gabashvili (Spain) Pablo Andújar
September 28	2009 Tennislife Cup; Naples, Italy; Regular series Clay (red) – €64,000+H – 32S/22Q/16D; Singles – Doubles	(Croatia) Ivan Dodig (Portugal) Fred Gil; 6–3, 6–1	(Brazil) Thiago Alves (Czech Republic) Lukáš Rosol	(Romania) Adrian Ungur (Spain) Óscar Hernández	(Australia) Peter Luczak (Spain) Marcel Granollers (Russia) Teymuraz Gabashvili (Spain) Pablo Andújar
September 28	2009 Club Premium Open; Quito, Ecuador; Regular series Clay (red) – $35,000+H – 32S/24Q/16D; Singles – Doubles	(Colombia) Carlos Salamanca; 7–6(4), 6–7(5), 6–4	(Argentina) Sebastián Decoud	(Colombia) Santiago Giraldo (Germany) Andre Begemann	(Ecuador) Giovanni Lapentti (Canada) Peter Polansky (Mexico) Santiago González (United States) Eric Nunez
September 28	2009 Club Premium Open; Quito, Ecuador; Regular series Clay (red) – $35,000+H – 32S/24Q/16D; Singles – Doubles	(Mexico) Santiago González (United States) Travis Rettenmaier; 1–6, 6–3, [10–3]	(Colombia) Michael Quintero (Spain) Fernando Vicente	(Colombia) Santiago Giraldo (Germany) Andre Begemann	(Ecuador) Giovanni Lapentti (Canada) Peter Polansky (Mexico) Santiago González (United States) Eric Nunez

=== October ===
Week of	Tournament	Champions	Runners-up	Semifinalists	Quarterfinalists
October 5	2009 Ethias Trophy; Mons, Belgium; Tretorn SERIE+ Hard (i) – €106,500+H – 32S/32Q/16D; Singles – Doubles	(Serbia) Janko Tipsarević; 7–6(4), 6–3	(Ukraine) Sergiy Stakhovsky	(Belgium) Steve Darcis (Ukraine) Illya Marchenko	(Belgium) Xavier Malisse (France) Josselin Ouanna (Russia) Evgeny Korolev (Slovakia) Lukáš Lacko
October 5	2009 Ethias Trophy; Mons, Belgium; Tretorn SERIE+ Hard (i) – €106,500+H – 32S/32Q/16D; Singles – Doubles	(Uzbekistan) Denis Istomin (Russia) Evgeny Korolev; 6–7(4), 7–6(4), [11–9]	(Colombia) Alejandro Falla (Russia) Teymuraz Gabashvili	(Belgium) Steve Darcis (Ukraine) Illya Marchenko	(Belgium) Xavier Malisse (France) Josselin Ouanna (Russia) Evgeny Korolev (Slovakia) Lukáš Lacko
October 5	2009 Copa Petrobras Montevideo; Montevideo, Uruguay; Regular series Clay (red) – $75,000+H – 32S/24Q/16D; Singles – Doubles	(Uruguay) Pablo Cuevas; 7–5, 6–1	(Ecuador) Nicolás Lapentti	(Argentina) Gastón Gaudio (Argentina) Juan Ignacio Chela	(Portugal) Leonardo Tavares (Peru) Luis Horna (Argentina) Juan Pablo Brzezicki (Argentina) Máximo González
October 5	2009 Copa Petrobras Montevideo; Montevideo, Uruguay; Regular series Clay (red) – $75,000+H – 32S/24Q/16D; Singles – Doubles	(Argentina) Juan Pablo Brzezicki (Spain) David Marrero; 6–4, 6–4	(Uruguay) Martín Cuevas (Uruguay) Pablo Cuevas	(Argentina) Gastón Gaudio (Argentina) Juan Ignacio Chela	(Portugal) Leonardo Tavares (Peru) Luis Horna (Argentina) Juan Pablo Brzezicki (Argentina) Máximo González
October 5	2009 Natomas Men's Pro Tennis Tournament; Sacramento, United States; Regular series Hard – $50,000 – 32S/32Q/16D/4Q; Singles – Doubles	(Colombia) Santiago Giraldo; 7–6(4), 6–1	(United States) Jesse Levine	(United States) Jesse Witten (United States) Ryan Harrison	(United States) Robert Kendrick (Philippines) Treat Huey (United States) Scoville Jenkins (Australia) Nick Lindahl
October 5	2009 Natomas Men's Pro Tennis Tournament; Sacramento, United States; Regular series Hard – $50,000 – 32S/32Q/16D/4Q; Singles – Doubles	(United States) Lester Cook (United States) David Martin; 4–6, 6–3, [10–5]	(Mexico) Santiago González (United States) Travis Rettenmaier	(United States) Jesse Witten (United States) Ryan Harrison	(United States) Robert Kendrick (Philippines) Treat Huey (United States) Scoville Jenkins (Australia) Nick Lindahl
October 5	2009 Open Tarragona Costa Daurada; Tarragona, Spain; Regular series Clay (red) – €42,500+H – 32S/32Q/16D; Singles – Doubles	(Spain) Daniel Gimeno Traver; 6–4, 6–0	(Italy) Paolo Lorenzi	(Czech Republic) Jan Hájek (Spain) Albert Ramos Viñolas	(Australia) Peter Luczak (Italy) Alberto Brizzi (Croatia) Antonio Veić (Spain) Pere Riba
October 5	2009 Open Tarragona Costa Daurada; Tarragona, Spain; Regular series Clay (red) – €42,500+H – 32S/32Q/16D; Singles – Doubles	(Poland) Tomasz Bednarek (Poland) Mateusz Kowalczyk; 6–1, 6–1	(Italy) Flavio Cipolla (Italy) Alessandro Motti	(Czech Republic) Jan Hájek (Spain) Albert Ramos Viñolas	(Australia) Peter Luczak (Italy) Alberto Brizzi (Croatia) Antonio Veić (Spain) Pere Riba
October 12	2009 Tashkent Challenger; Tashkent, Uzbekistan; Regular series Hard – $125,000+H – 32S/16Q/16D; Singles – Doubles	(Cyprus) Marcos Baghdatis; 6–3, 1–6, 6–3	(Uzbekistan) Denis Istomin	(Ukraine) Alexandr Dolgopolov (Slovakia) Lukáš Lacko	(Russia) Alexander Kudryavtsev (Russia) Andrey Kumantsov (Belgium) Christophe Rochus (Ukraine) Sergiy Stakhovsky
October 12	2009 Tashkent Challenger; Tashkent, Uzbekistan; Regular series Hard – $125,000+H – 32S/16Q/16D; Singles – Doubles	(Uzbekistan) Murad Inoyatov (Uzbekistan) Denis Istomin; 7–6(4), 6–4	(Czech Republic) Jiří Krkoška (Slovakia) Lukáš Lacko	(Ukraine) Alexandr Dolgopolov (Slovakia) Lukáš Lacko	(Russia) Alexander Kudryavtsev (Russia) Andrey Kumantsov (Belgium) Christophe Rochus (Ukraine) Sergiy Stakhovsky
October 12	2009 Copa Petrobras Asunción; Asunción, Paraguay; Regular series Clay (red) – $75,000+H – 32S/27Q/16D; Singles – Doubles	(Paraguay) Ramón Delgado; 7–6(2), 1–6, 6–3	(Spain) Daniel Gimeno Traver	(Slovenia) Blaž Kavčič (Argentina) Diego Junqueira	(Argentina) Juan-Martín Aranguren (Spain) Santiago Ventura (Argentina) Facundo Bagnis (Argentina) Gastón Gaudio
October 12	2009 Copa Petrobras Asunción; Asunción, Paraguay; Regular series Clay (red) – $75,000+H – 32S/27Q/16D; Singles – Doubles	(Spain) Rubén Ramírez Hidalgo (Spain) Santiago Ventura; 6–3, 7–6(5)	(Argentina) Máximo González (Argentina) Eduardo Schwank	(Slovenia) Blaž Kavčič (Argentina) Diego Junqueira	(Argentina) Juan-Martín Aranguren (Spain) Santiago Ventura (Argentina) Facundo Bagnis (Argentina) Gastón Gaudio
October 12	2009 Open de Rennes; Rennes, France; Regular series Hard (i) – €64,000+H – 32S/20Q/16D; Singles – Doubles	(Colombia) Alejandro Falla; 6–3, 6–2	(France) Thierry Ascione	(France) David Guez (Germany) Dieter Kindlmann	(Italy) Stefano Galvani (Belgium) Xavier Malisse (South Africa) Kevin Anderson (Czech Republic) Jan Minář
October 12	2009 Open de Rennes; Rennes, France; Regular series Hard (i) – €64,000+H – 32S/20Q/16D; Singles – Doubles	(United States) Eric Butorac (Croatia) Lovro Zovko; 6–4, 3–6, [10–6]	(South Africa) Kevin Anderson (Slovakia) Dominik Hrbatý	(France) David Guez (Germany) Dieter Kindlmann	(Italy) Stefano Galvani (Belgium) Xavier Malisse (South Africa) Kevin Anderson (Czech Republic) Jan Minář
October 12	2009 Royal Bank of Scotland Challenger; Tiburon, United States; Regular series Hard – $50,000 – 32S/32Q/16D/4Q; Singles – Doubles	(Japan) Go Soeda; 3–6, 6–3, 6–2	(Serbia) Ilija Bozoljac	(Australia) Nick Lindahl (United States) Kevin Kim	(United States) Michael Russell (United States) Jesse Levine (Colombia) Santiago Giraldo (Croatia) Roko Karanušić
October 12	2009 Royal Bank of Scotland Challenger; Tiburon, United States; Regular series Hard – $50,000 – 32S/32Q/16D/4Q; Singles – Doubles	(Philippines) Treat Huey (India) Harsh Mankad; 6–4, 6–4	(Serbia) Ilija Bozoljac (Serbia) Dušan Vemić	(Australia) Nick Lindahl (United States) Kevin Kim	(United States) Michael Russell (United States) Jesse Levine (Colombia) Santiago Giraldo (Croatia) Roko Karanušić
October 12	2009 Købstædernes ATP Challenger; Kolding, Denmark; Regular series Hard (i) – €42,500 – 32S/32Q/16D; Singles – Doubles	(United Kingdom) Alex Bogdanovic; 3–6, 7–6(7) defaulted	(Croatia) Ivan Dodig	(Austria) Alexander Peya (Czech Republic) Robin Vik	(Austria) Martin Fischer (Netherlands) Thiemo de Bakker (Germany) Matthias Bachinger (Austria) Stefan Koubek
October 12	2009 Købstædernes ATP Challenger; Kolding, Denmark; Regular series Hard (i) – €42,500 – 32S/32Q/16D; Singles – Doubles	(Austria) Martin Fischer (Austria) Philipp Oswald; 7–5, 6–3	(United Kingdom) Jonathan Marray (Pakistan) Aisam-ul-Haq Qureshi	(Austria) Alexander Peya (Czech Republic) Robin Vik	(Austria) Martin Fischer (Netherlands) Thiemo de Bakker (Germany) Matthias Bachinger (Austria) Stefan Koubek
October 19	2009 Open d'Orléans; Orléans, France; Regular series Hard (i) – €106,500+H – 32S/28Q/16D; Singles – Doubles	(Belgium) Xavier Malisse; 6–1, 6–2	(France) Stéphane Robert	(Switzerland) Stéphane Bohli (France) Michaël Llodra	(France) Jérémy Chardy (France) Nicolas Mahut (Germany) Daniel Brands (Portugal) Fred Gil
October 19	2009 Open d'Orléans; Orléans, France; Regular series Hard (i) – €106,500+H – 32S/28Q/16D; Singles – Doubles	(United Kingdom) Colin Fleming (United Kingdom) Ken Skupski; 6–1, 6–1	(France) Sébastien Grosjean (France) Olivier Patience	(Switzerland) Stéphane Bohli (France) Michaël Llodra	(France) Jérémy Chardy (France) Nicolas Mahut (Germany) Daniel Brands (Portugal) Fred Gil
October 19	2009 Copa Petrobras Santiago; Santiago, Chile; Regular series Clay (red) – $100,000+H – 32S/13Q/16D; Singles – Doubles	(Argentina) Eduardo Schwank; 6–2, 6–2	(Chile) Nicolás Massú	(Argentina) Juan Ignacio Chela (Spain) Daniel Muñoz de la Nava	(Canada) Peter Polansky (Spain) Rubén Ramírez Hidalgo (Argentina) Federico Delbonis (Ecuador) Nicolás Lapentti
October 19	2009 Copa Petrobras Santiago; Santiago, Chile; Regular series Clay (red) – $100,000+H – 32S/13Q/16D; Singles – Doubles	(Argentina) Diego Cristín (Argentina) Eduardo Schwank; 6–4, 7–5	(Argentina) Juan Pablo Brzezicki (Spain) David Marrero	(Argentina) Juan Ignacio Chela (Spain) Daniel Muñoz de la Nava	(Canada) Peter Polansky (Spain) Rubén Ramírez Hidalgo (Argentina) Federico Delbonis (Ecuador) Nicolás Lapentti
October 19	2009 Calabasas Pro Tennis Championships; Calabasas, United States; Regular series Hard – $50,000 – 32S/32Q/16D/4Q; Singles – Doubles	(United States) Donald Young; 7–6(4), 6–1	(United States) Michael Russell	(United States) Michael Yani (Philippines) Cecil Mamiit	(Slovenia) Luka Gregorc (India) Prakash Amritraj (Japan) Go Soeda (Slovenia) Grega Žemlja
October 19	2009 Calabasas Pro Tennis Championships; Calabasas, United States; Regular series Hard – $50,000 – 32S/32Q/16D/4Q; Singles – Doubles	(Mexico) Santiago González (Germany) Simon Stadler; 6–2, 5–7, [10–4]	(Philippines) Treat Huey (India) Harsh Mankad	(United States) Michael Yani (Philippines) Cecil Mamiit	(Slovenia) Luka Gregorc (India) Prakash Amritraj (Japan) Go Soeda (Slovenia) Grega Žemlja
October 19	2009 Cyclus Open de Tênis; Florianópolis, Brazil; Regular series Clay (red) – $35,000+H – 32S/29Q/16D; Singles – Doubles	(France) Guillaume Rufin; 6–4, 3–6, 6–3	(Spain) Pere Riba	(Germany) Andre Begemann (Argentina) Gastón Gaudio	(Argentina) Diego Junqueira (Slovenia) Blaž Kavčič (France) Jonathan Dasnieres de Veigy (Spain) Íñigo Cervantes
October 19	2009 Cyclus Open de Tênis; Florianópolis, Brazil; Regular series Clay (red) – $35,000+H – 32S/29Q/16D; Singles – Doubles	(Poland) Tomasz Bednarek (Poland) Mateusz Kowalczyk; 6–1, 6–4	(Spain) Daniel Gimeno Traver (Spain) Pere Riba	(Germany) Andre Begemann (Argentina) Gastón Gaudio	(Argentina) Diego Junqueira (Slovenia) Blaž Kavčič (France) Jonathan Dasnieres de Veigy (Spain) Íñigo Cervantes
October 26	2009 Samsung Securities Cup; Seoul, South Korea; Tretorn SERIE+ Hard – $125,000+H – 32S/32Q/16D; Singles – Doubles	(Slovakia) Lukáš Lacko; 6–4, 6–2	(Czech Republic) Dušan Lojda	(United States) Lester Cook (Netherlands) Thiemo de Bakker	(Australia) Greg Jones (India) Somdev Devvarman (Australia) Marinko Matosevic (Chinese Taipei) Lu Yen-hsun
October 26	2009 Samsung Securities Cup; Seoul, South Korea; Tretorn SERIE+ Hard – $125,000+H – 32S/32Q/16D; Singles – Doubles	(South Africa) Rik de Voest (Chinese Taipei) Lu Yen-hsun; 7–6(5), 3–6, [10–6]	(Thailand) Sanchai Ratiwatana (Thailand) Sonchat Ratiwatana	(United States) Lester Cook (Netherlands) Thiemo de Bakker	(Australia) Greg Jones (India) Somdev Devvarman (Australia) Marinko Matosevic (Chinese Taipei) Lu Yen-hsun
October 26	2009 Copa Petrobras São Paulo; São Paulo, Brazil; Regular series Clay (red) – $75,000+H – 32S/28Q/16D; Singles – Doubles	(Brazil) Thomaz Bellucci; 6–4, 6–4	(Ecuador) Nicolás Lapentti	(Spain) David Marrero (Spain) Santiago Ventura	(Chile) Nicolás Massú (Brazil) Franco Ferreiro (Brazil) Júlio Silva (Argentina) Juan Ignacio Chela
October 26	2009 Copa Petrobras São Paulo; São Paulo, Brazil; Regular series Clay (red) – $75,000+H – 32S/28Q/16D; Singles – Doubles	(Brazil) Franco Ferreiro (Brazil) Ricardo Mello; 6–3, 6–3	(Argentina) Diego Junqueira (Spain) David Marrero	(Spain) David Marrero (Spain) Santiago Ventura	(Chile) Nicolás Massú (Brazil) Franco Ferreiro (Brazil) Júlio Silva (Argentina) Juan Ignacio Chela

=== November ===
Week of	Tournament	Champions	Runners-up	Semifinalists	Quarterfinalists
November 2	2009 President's Cup; Astana, Kazakhstan; Regular series Hard (i) – $125,000 – 32S/15Q/16D; Singles – Doubles	(Kazakhstan) Andrey Golubev; 6–3, 6–3	(Ukraine) Illya Marchenko	(Germany) Björn Phau (Russia) Konstantin Kravchuk	(Slovakia) Marek Semjan (Russia) Evgeny Donskoy (France) Stéphane Robert (Kazakhstan) Mikhail Kukushkin
November 2	2009 President's Cup; Astana, Kazakhstan; Regular series Hard (i) – $125,000 – 32S/15Q/16D; Singles – Doubles	(United Kingdom) Jonathan Marray (United Kingdom) Jamie Murray; 4–6, 6–3, [10–5]	(United States) David Martin (Netherlands) Rogier Wassen	(Germany) Björn Phau (Russia) Konstantin Kravchuk	(Slovakia) Marek Semjan (Russia) Evgeny Donskoy (France) Stéphane Robert (Kazakhstan) Mikhail Kukushkin
November 2	2009 Flea Market Cup; Chuncheon, South Korea; Tretorn SERIE+ Hard – $100,000+H – 32S/32Q/16D; Singles – Doubles	(Chinese Taipei) Lu Yen-hsun; 6–2, 6–3	(Netherlands) Igor Sijsling	(Denmark) Frederik Nielsen (Israel) Harel Levy	(United States) Alex Kuznetsov (India) Prakash Amritraj (Germany) Tobias Kamke (Japan) Tatsuma Ito
November 2	2009 Flea Market Cup; Chuncheon, South Korea; Tretorn SERIE+ Hard – $100,000+H – 32S/32Q/16D; Singles – Doubles	(Latvia) Andis Juška (Russia) Dmitri Sitak; 3–6, 6–3, [10–2]	(Chinese Taipei) Lee Hsin-han (Chinese Taipei) Yang Tsung-hua	(Denmark) Frederik Nielsen (Israel) Harel Levy	(United States) Alex Kuznetsov (India) Prakash Amritraj (Germany) Tobias Kamke (Japan) Tatsuma Ito
November 2	2009 Seguros Bolívar Open Medellín; Medellín, Colombia; Regular series Clay (red) – $50,000+H – 32S/22Q/16D; Singles – Doubles	(Argentina) Juan Ignacio Chela; 6–4, 4–6, 6–4	(Brazil) João Souza	(Argentina) Eduardo Schwank (Spain) Pere Riba	(Brazil) Ricardo Hocevar (Argentina) Martín Alund (Spain) Pablo Andújar (Colombia) Carlos Salamanca
November 2	2009 Seguros Bolívar Open Medellín; Medellín, Colombia; Regular series Clay (red) – $50,000+H – 32S/22Q/16D; Singles – Doubles	(Argentina) Sebastián Decoud (Argentina) Eduardo Schwank; 6–0, 6–2	(Argentina) Diego Junqueira (Spain) David Marrero	(Argentina) Eduardo Schwank (Spain) Pere Riba	(Brazil) Ricardo Hocevar (Argentina) Martín Alund (Spain) Pablo Andújar (Colombia) Carlos Salamanca
November 2	2009 Virginia National Bank Men's Pro Champ; Charlottesville, United States; Regular series Hard (i) – $50,000 – 32S/32Q/16D/4Q; Singles – Doubles	(United States) Kevin Kim; 6–4, 6–7(8), 6–4	(India) Somdev Devvarman	(United States) Ryan Sweeting (United States) Donald Young	(United States) Michael Russell (Netherlands) Matwé Middelkoop (United Kingdom) Dominic Inglot (India) Sanam Singh
November 2	2009 Virginia National Bank Men's Pro Champ; Charlottesville, United States; Regular series Hard (i) – $50,000 – 32S/32Q/16D/4Q; Singles – Doubles	(Germany) Martin Emmrich (Sweden) Andreas Siljeström; 6–4, 3–6, [11–9]	(United Kingdom) Dominic Inglot (United States) Rylan Rizza	(United States) Ryan Sweeting (United States) Donald Young	(United States) Michael Russell (Netherlands) Matwé Middelkoop (United Kingdom) Dominic Inglot (India) Sanam Singh
November 2	2009 Bauer Watertechnology Cup; Eckental, Germany; Regular series Carpet (i) – €30,000+H – 32S/32Q/16D; Singles – Doubles	(Germany) Daniel Brands; 6–4, 6–4	(Jamaica) Dustin Brown	(Germany) Dieter Kindlmann (France) Sébastien de Chaunac	(Germany) Peter Gojowczyk (Germany) Nils Langer (Austria) Alexander Peya (Czech Republic) Lukáš Rosol
November 2	2009 Bauer Watertechnology Cup; Eckental, Germany; Regular series Carpet (i) – €30,000+H – 32S/32Q/16D; Singles – Doubles	(Germany) Michael Kohlmann (Austria) Alexander Peya; 6–4, 7–6(4)	(Germany) Philipp Marx (Slovakia) Igor Zelenay	(Germany) Dieter Kindlmann (France) Sébastien de Chaunac	(Germany) Peter Gojowczyk (Germany) Nils Langer (Austria) Alexander Peya (Czech Republic) Lukáš Rosol
November 9	2009 Challenger Ciudad de Guayaquil; Guayaquil, Ecuador; Regular series Clay (red) – $50,000+H – 32S/32Q/16D; Singles – Doubles	(Ecuador) Nicolás Lapentti; 6–2, 2–6, 7–6(4)	(Colombia) Santiago Giraldo	(Argentina) Eduardo Schwank (Germany) Lars Pörschke	(Brazil) Júlio Silva (Portugal) Pedro Sousa (Portugal) Rui Machado (Argentina) Brian Dabul
November 9	2009 Challenger Ciudad de Guayaquil; Guayaquil, Ecuador; Regular series Clay (red) – $50,000+H – 32S/32Q/16D; Singles – Doubles	(Ecuador) Julio César Campozano (Ecuador) Emilio Gómez; 6–7(2), 6–3, [10–8]	(Austria) Andreas Haider-Maurer (Germany) Lars Pörschke	(Argentina) Eduardo Schwank (Germany) Lars Pörschke	(Brazil) Júlio Silva (Portugal) Pedro Sousa (Portugal) Rui Machado (Argentina) Brian Dabul
November 9	2009 Knoxville Challenger; Knoxville, United States; Regular series Hard (i) – $50,000 – 32S/32Q/16D/4Q; Singles – Doubles	(United States) Taylor Dent; 6–3, 7–6(6)	(Serbia) Ilija Bozoljac	(United States) Ryan Sweeting (Slovenia) Grega Žemlja	(United States) Wayne Odesnik (South Africa) Kevin Anderson (Paraguay) Ramón Delgado (United States) Donald Young
November 9	2009 Knoxville Challenger; Knoxville, United States; Regular series Hard (i) – $50,000 – 32S/32Q/16D/4Q; Singles – Doubles	(Germany) Martin Emmrich (Sweden) Andreas Siljeström; 7–5, 6–4	(South Africa) Raven Klaasen (South Africa) Izak van der Merwe	(United States) Ryan Sweeting (Slovenia) Grega Žemlja	(United States) Wayne Odesnik (South Africa) Kevin Anderson (Paraguay) Ramón Delgado (United States) Donald Young
November 9	2009 Lambertz Open by STAWAG; Aachen, Germany; Regular series Carpet (i) – €42,500+H – 32S/31Q/16D; Singles – Doubles	(United States) Rajeev Ram; 7–6(2), 6–7(5), 7–6(2)	(Jamaica) Dustin Brown	(Germany) Daniel Brands (Belgium) Ruben Bemelmans	(Republic of Ireland) Louk Sorensen (Belgium) Steve Darcis (Poland) Michał Przysiężny (Germany) Simon Stadler
November 9	2009 Lambertz Open by STAWAG; Aachen, Germany; Regular series Carpet (i) – €42,500+H – 32S/31Q/16D; Singles – Doubles	(India) Rohan Bopanna (Pakistan) Aisam-ul-Haq Qureshi; 6–4, 7–6(6)	(Germany) Philipp Marx (Slovakia) Igor Zelenay	(Germany) Daniel Brands (Belgium) Ruben Bemelmans	(Republic of Ireland) Louk Sorensen (Belgium) Steve Darcis (Poland) Michał Przysiężny (Germany) Simon Stadler
November 9	2009 Caversham Int'l Tennis Tournament; Saint Brélade, Jersey, Great Britain; Regular series Carpet (i) – €42,500 – 32S/18Q/16D; Singles – Doubles	(Finland) Jarkko Nieminen; 4–6, 6–1, 7–5	(France) Stéphane Robert	(Germany) Tobias Kamke (Netherlands) Robin Haase	(Denmark) Frederik Nielsen (Finland) Henri Kontinen (Belgium) Yannick Mertens (Belarus) Uladzimir Ignatik
November 9	2009 Caversham Int'l Tennis Tournament; Saint Brélade, Jersey, Great Britain; Regular series Carpet (i) – €42,500 – 32S/18Q/16D; Singles – Doubles	(Denmark) Frederik Nielsen (Australia) Joseph Sirianni; 7–5, 3–6, [10–2]	(Finland) Henri Kontinen (Finland) Jarkko Nieminen	(Germany) Tobias Kamke (Netherlands) Robin Haase	(Denmark) Frederik Nielsen (Finland) Henri Kontinen (Belgium) Yannick Mertens (Belarus) Uladzimir Ignatik
November 16	2009 Ritro Slovak Open; Bratislava, Slovakia; Tretorn SERIE+ Hard (i) – €106,500 – 32S/29Q/16D; Singles – Doubles	(Germany) Michael Berrer; 6–7(6), 6–4, 7–6(3)	(Slovakia) Dominik Hrbatý	(Israel) Harel Levy (Slovakia) Lukáš Lacko	(Australia) Rameez Junaid (United Kingdom) Alex Bogdanovic (Austria) Stefan Koubek (Kazakhstan) Andrey Golubev
November 16	2009 Ritro Slovak Open; Bratislava, Slovakia; Tretorn SERIE+ Hard (i) – €106,500 – 32S/29Q/16D; Singles – Doubles	(Germany) Philipp Marx (Slovakia) Igor Zelenay; 6–4, 6–4	(Czech Republic) Leoš Friedl (Czech Republic) David Škoch	(Israel) Harel Levy (Slovakia) Lukáš Lacko	(Australia) Rameez Junaid (United Kingdom) Alex Bogdanovic (Austria) Stefan Koubek (Kazakhstan) Andrey Golubev
November 16	2009 JSM Challenger of Champaign–Urbana; Champaign, United States; Regular series Hard (i) – $50,000 – 32S/31Q/16D/4Q; Singles – Doubles	(United States) Michael Russell; 7–5, 6–4	(United States) Taylor Dent	(United States) Kevin Kim (Lithuania) Ričardas Berankis	(United States) Ryan Sweeting (United States) Jesse Levine (Sweden) Björn Rehnquist (Australia) Kaden Hensel
November 16	2009 JSM Challenger of Champaign–Urbana; Champaign, United States; Regular series Hard (i) – $50,000 – 32S/31Q/16D/4Q; Singles – Doubles	(United States) Brian Battistone (United States) Dann Battistone; 7–5, 7–6(5)	(Philippines) Treat Huey (India) Harsh Mankad	(United States) Kevin Kim (Lithuania) Ričardas Berankis	(United States) Ryan Sweeting (United States) Jesse Levine (Sweden) Björn Rehnquist (Australia) Kaden Hensel
November 16	2009 Lima Challenger; Lima, Peru; Regular series Clay (red) – $50,000 – 32S/29Q/16D; Singles – Doubles	(Argentina) Eduardo Schwank; 7–5, 6–4	(Chile) Jorge Aguilar	(Argentina) Brian Dabul (Chile) Cristóbal Saavedra Corvalán	(Argentina) Diego Junqueira (Peru) Iván Miranda (Argentina) Martín Alund (Argentina) Carlos Berlocq
November 16	2009 Lima Challenger; Lima, Peru; Regular series Clay (red) – $50,000 – 32S/29Q/16D; Singles – Doubles	(Argentina) Martín Alund (Argentina) Juan-Martín Aranguren; 6–2, 7–6(4)	(Chile) Guillermo Rivera Aránguiz (Chile) Cristóbal Saavedra Corvalán	(Argentina) Brian Dabul (Chile) Cristóbal Saavedra Corvalán	(Argentina) Diego Junqueira (Peru) Iván Miranda (Argentina) Martín Alund (Argentina) Carlos Berlocq
November 16	2009 Keio Challenger; Yokohama, Japan; Regular series Hard – $50,000 – 32S/32Q/16D; Singles – Doubles	(Japan) Takao Suzuki; 6–4, 7–6(5)	(Austria) Martin Fischer	(Japan) Go Soeda (Austria) Philipp Oswald	(Chinese Taipei) Yang Tsung-hua (Belarus) Uladzimir Ignatik (Germany) Dieter Kindlmann (South Korea) Im Kyu-tae
November 16	2009 Keio Challenger; Yokohama, Japan; Regular series Hard – $50,000 – 32S/32Q/16D; Singles – Doubles	(Chinese Taipei) Yang Tsung-hua (Chinese Taipei) Yi Chu-huan; 6–7(9), 6–3, [12–10]	(Kazakhstan) Alexey Kedryuk (Japan) Junn Mitsuhashi	(Japan) Go Soeda (Austria) Philipp Oswald	(Chinese Taipei) Yang Tsung-hua (Belarus) Uladzimir Ignatik (Germany) Dieter Kindlmann (South Korea) Im Kyu-tae
November 16	2009 Abierto Int'l Varonil Casablanca Cancún; Cancún, Mexico; Regular series Clay (red) – $35,000+H – 32S/32Q/16D; Singles – Doubles	(Chile) Nicolás Massú; 6–3, 7–5	(Slovenia) Grega Žemlja	(Austria) Andreas Haider-Maurer (Spain) Adrián Menéndez Maceiras	(Portugal) Rui Machado (Monaco) Benjamin Balleret (Germany) Marc Sieber (Uruguay) Marcel Felder
November 16	2009 Abierto Int'l Varonil Casablanca Cancún; Cancún, Mexico; Regular series Clay (red) – $35,000+H – 32S/32Q/16D; Singles – Doubles	(Germany) Andre Begemann (Portugal) Leonardo Tavares; 6–1, 6–7(6), [10–8]	(United States) Greg Ouellette (Canada) Adil Shamasdin	(Austria) Andreas Haider-Maurer (Spain) Adrián Menéndez Maceiras	(Portugal) Rui Machado (Monaco) Benjamin Balleret (Germany) Marc Sieber (Uruguay) Marcel Felder
November 23	2009 IPP Open; Helsinki, Finland; Regular series Carpet (i) – €106,500+H – 32S/30Q/16D; Singles – Doubles	(Poland) Michał Przysiężny; 4–6, 6–4, 6–1	(Switzerland) Stéphane Bohli	(Finland) Henri Kontinen (Netherlands) Robin Haase	(Finland) Jarkko Nieminen (Croatia) Antonio Veić (Belgium) Niels Desein (Slovakia) Karol Beck
November 23	2009 IPP Open; Helsinki, Finland; Regular series Carpet (i) – €106,500+H – 32S/30Q/16D; Singles – Doubles	(India) Rohan Bopanna (Pakistan) Aisam-ul-Haq Qureshi; 6–2, 7–6(7)	(Finland) Henri Kontinen (Finland) Jarkko Nieminen	(Finland) Henri Kontinen (Netherlands) Robin Haase	(Finland) Jarkko Nieminen (Croatia) Antonio Veić (Belgium) Niels Desein (Slovakia) Karol Beck
November 23	2009 Challenger Varonil Britania Zavaleta; Puebla, Mexico; Regular series Hard – $35,000+H – 32S/24Q/16D; Singles – Doubles	(Paraguay) Ramón Delgado; 6–3, 6–4	(Germany) Andre Begemann	(Slovenia) Grega Žemlja (Spain) Pere Riba	(Spain) José Checa Calvo (Slovenia) Blaž Kavčič (Chile) Nicolás Massú (Portugal) Leonardo Tavares
November 23	2009 Challenger Varonil Britania Zavaleta; Puebla, Mexico; Regular series Hard – $35,000+H – 32S/24Q/16D; Singles – Doubles	(Canada) Vasek Pospisil (Canada) Adil Shamasdin; 7–6(7), 6–0	(Spain) Guillermo Olaso (Spain) Pere Riba	(Slovenia) Grega Žemlja (Spain) Pere Riba	(Spain) José Checa Calvo (Slovenia) Blaž Kavčič (Chile) Nicolás Massú (Portugal) Leonardo Tavares
November 23	2009 Dunlop World Challenge; Toyota, Japan; Regular series Carpet (i) – $35,000+H – 32S/26Q/16D; Singles – Doubles	(Belarus) Uladzimir Ignatik; 7–6(7), 7–6(3)	(Japan) Tatsuma Ito	(Germany) Simon Stadler (Austria) Martin Fischer	(Japan) Junn Mitsuhashi (Austria) Philipp Oswald (Australia) Greg Jones (Japan) Yūichi Sugita
November 23	2009 Dunlop World Challenge; Toyota, Japan; Regular series Carpet (i) – $35,000+H – 32S/26Q/16D; Singles – Doubles	(Latvia) Andis Juška (Russia) Alexander Kudryavtsev; 6–4, 7–6(6)	(Kazakhstan) Alexey Kedryuk (Japan) Junn Mitsuhashi	(Germany) Simon Stadler (Austria) Martin Fischer	(Japan) Junn Mitsuhashi (Austria) Philipp Oswald (Australia) Greg Jones (Japan) Yūichi Sugita
November 30	2009 ATP Salzburg Indoors; Salzburg, Austria; Regular series Hard (i) – €64,000+H – 32S/26Q/16D; Singles – Doubles	(Germany) Michael Berrer; 6–7(4), 6–4, 6–4	(Finland) Jarkko Nieminen	(Germany) Daniel Brands (Slovakia) Karol Beck	(Belgium) Yannick Mertens (Germany) Philipp Petzschner (Austria) Daniel Köllerer (Switzerland) Stéphane Bohli
November 30	2009 ATP Salzburg Indoors; Salzburg, Austria; Regular series Hard (i) – €64,000+H – 32S/26Q/16D; Singles – Doubles	(Germany) Philipp Marx (Slovakia) Igor Zelenay; 6–4, 7–5	(Thailand) Sanchai Ratiwatana (Thailand) Sonchat Ratiwatana	(Germany) Daniel Brands (Slovakia) Karol Beck	(Belgium) Yannick Mertens (Germany) Philipp Petzschner (Austria) Daniel Köllerer (Switzerland) Stéphane Bohli
November 30	2009 Yugra Cup; Khanty-Mansiysk, Russia; Regular series Carpet (i) – $50,000+H – 32S/20Q/16D; Singles – Doubles	(Russia) Konstantin Kravchuk; 1–6, 6–3, 6–2	(Spain) Marcel Granollers	(Czech Republic) Jan Mertl (Russia) Andrey Kuznetsov	(Czech Republic) Daniel Lustig (Slovakia) Ivo Klec (Russia) Andrey Kumantsov (Russia) Alexander Kudryavtsev
November 30	2009 Yugra Cup; Khanty-Mansiysk, Russia; Regular series Carpet (i) – $50,000+H – 32S/20Q/16D; Singles – Doubles	(Spain) Marcel Granollers (Spain) Gerard Granollers; 6–3, 6–2	(Russia) Evgeny Kirillov (Russia) Andrey Kuznetsov	(Czech Republic) Jan Mertl (Russia) Andrey Kuznetsov	(Czech Republic) Daniel Lustig (Slovakia) Ivo Klec (Russia) Andrey Kumantsov (Russia) Alexander Kudryavtsev

=== December ===
No events that month.

== Statistical information ==
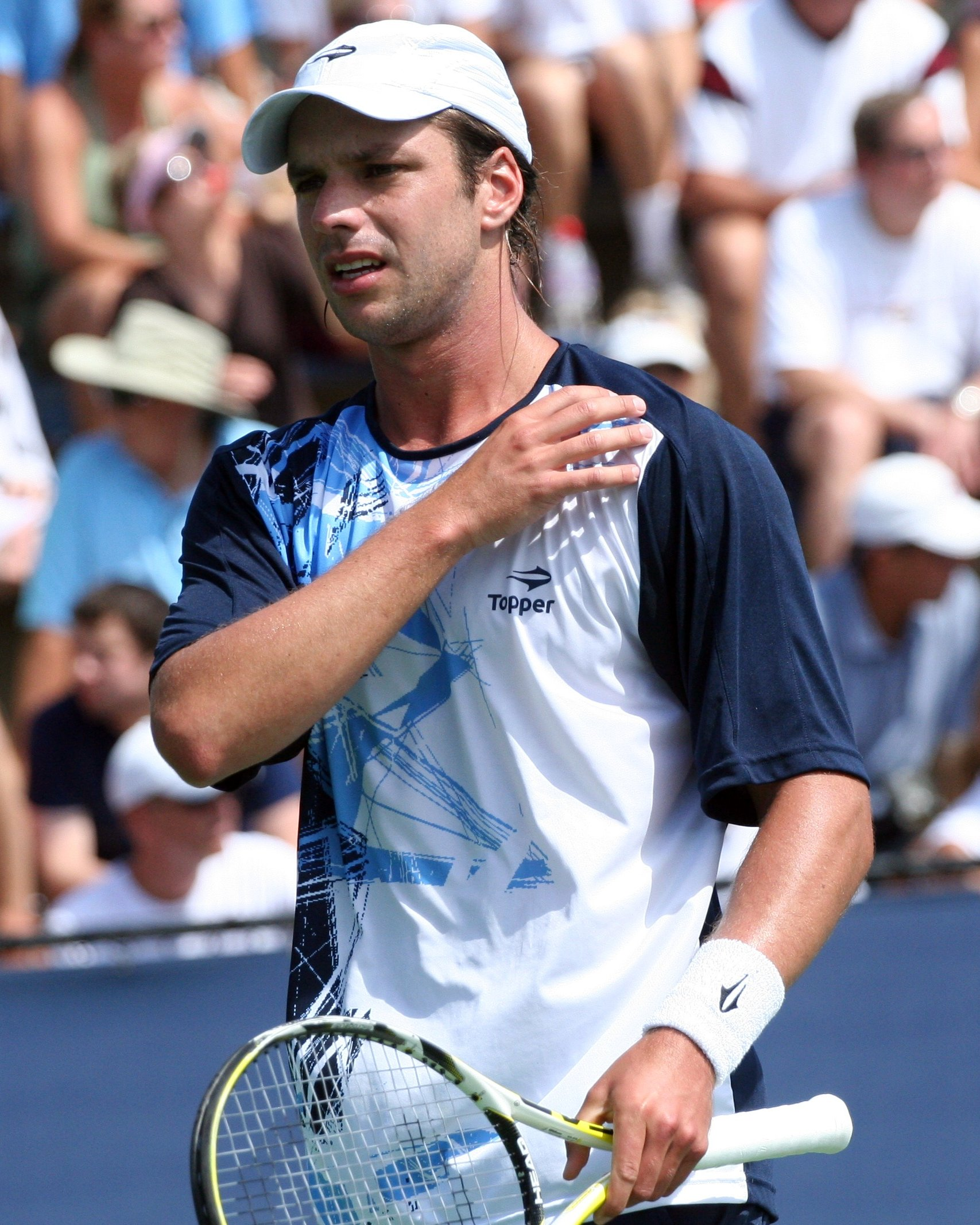
2009 ATP Challenger Tour title-leader Horacio Zeballos reached a career-high ranking of No. 41 during the season.

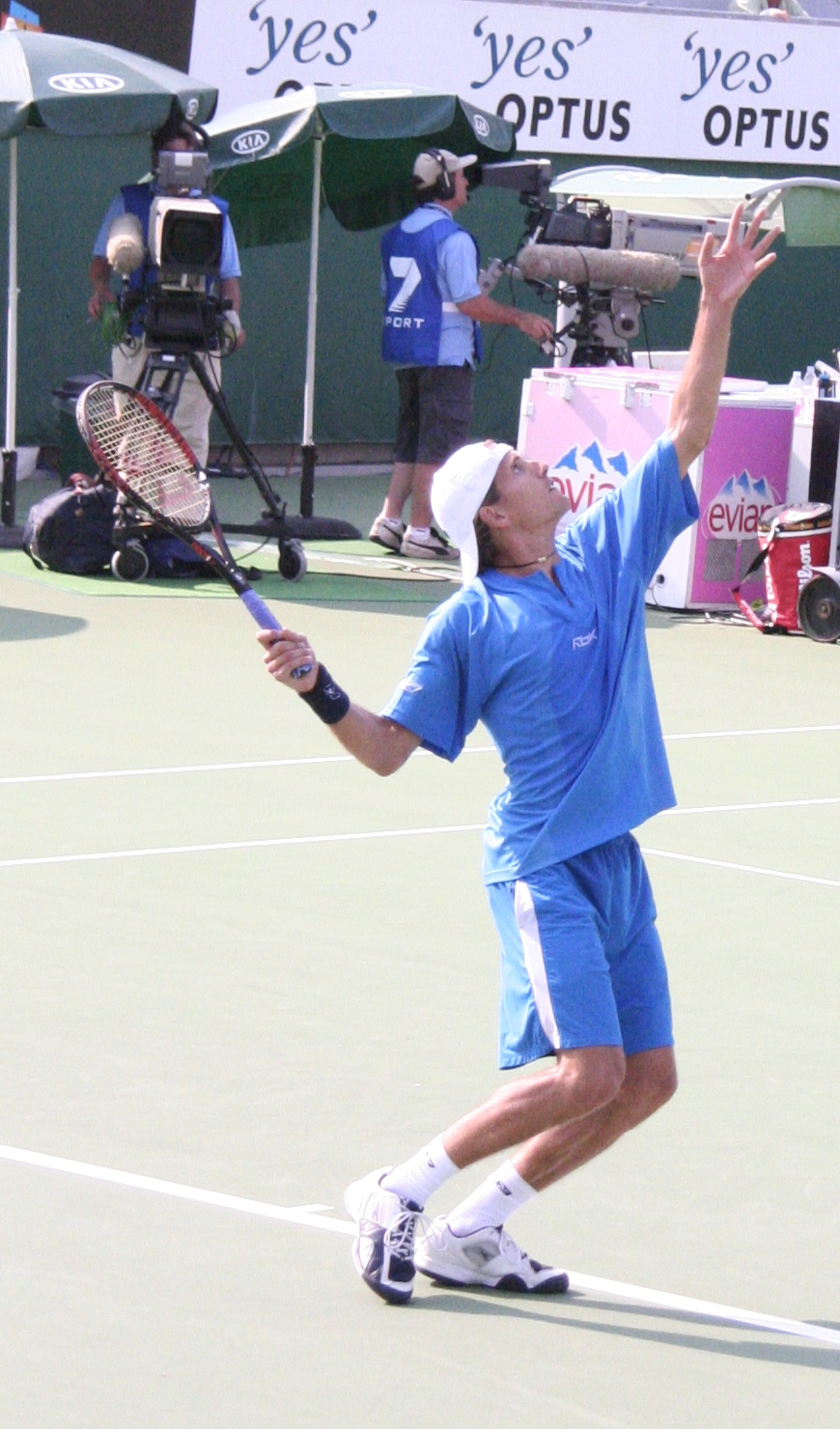
Rubén Ramírez Hidalgo was one of the most successful doubles players on the circuit with seven wins.

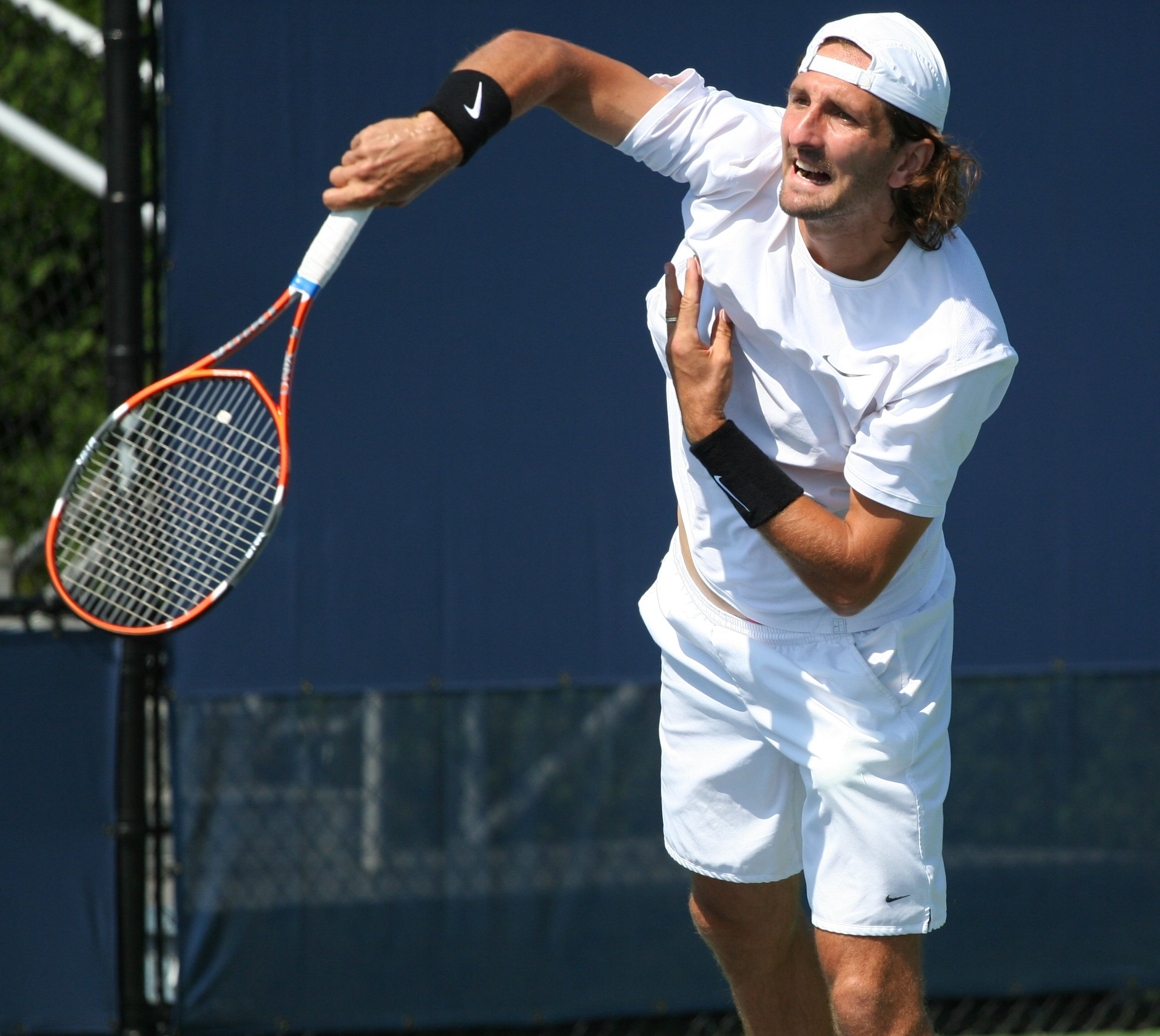
Jaroslav Levinský won four Tretorn SERIE+ doubles titles in 2009.

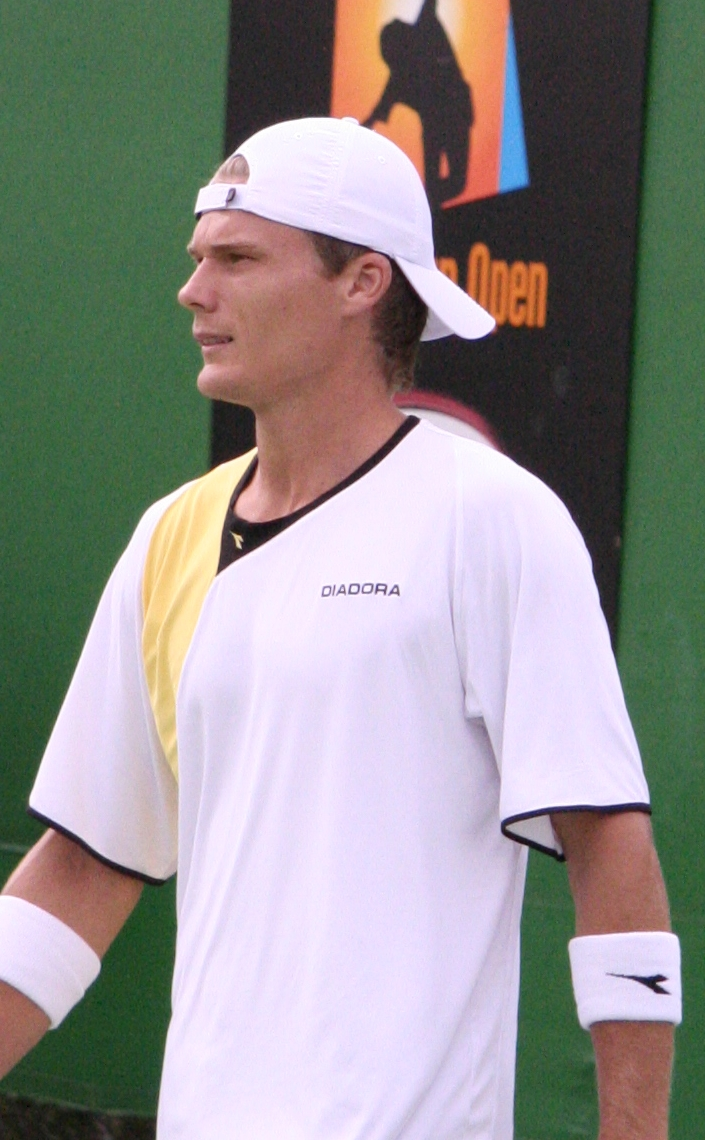
Peter Luczak won three singles and two doubles titles in 2009.

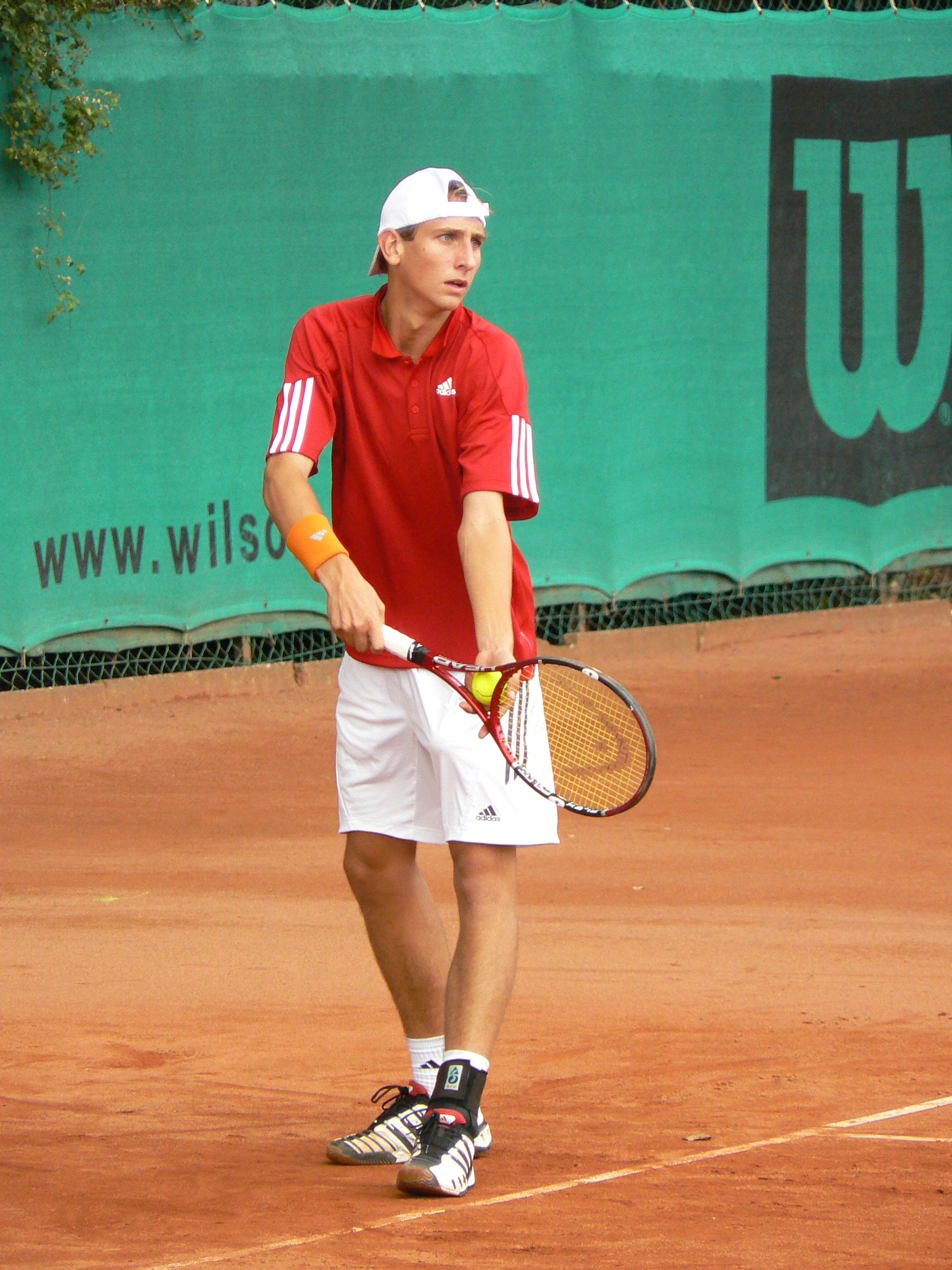
Thiemo de Bakker was the second most successful singles player in the 2009 season (alongside Becker), winning four titles.

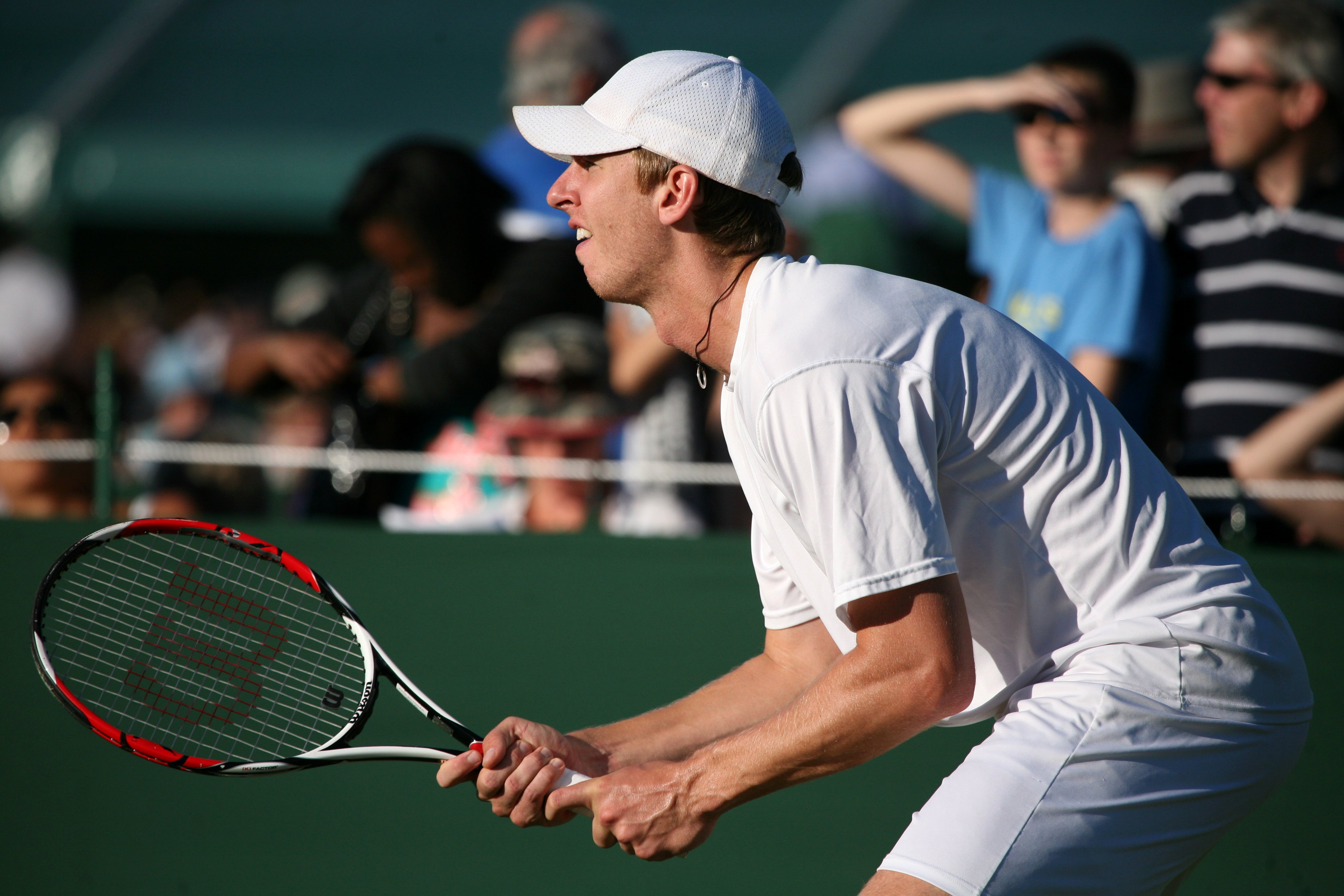
Eric Butorac was a doubles champion five times on the 2009 ATP Challenger Tour.

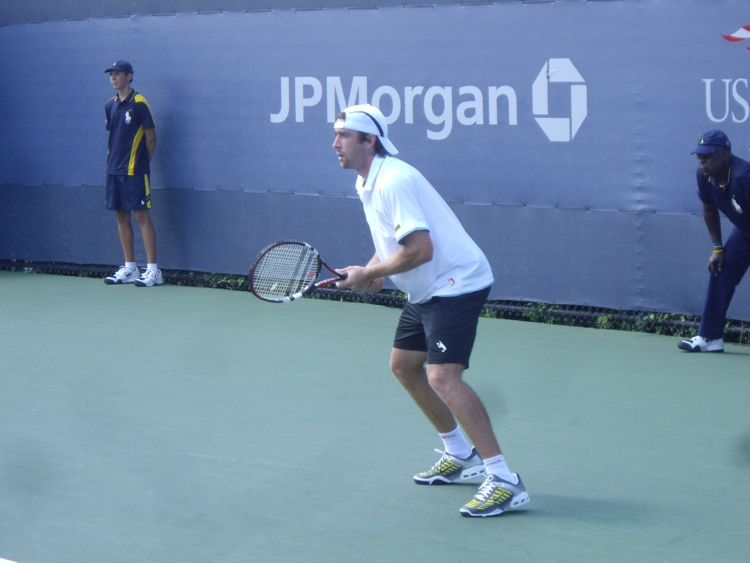
Benjamin Becker collected four singles titles on carpet and hard courts in the 2009 season.

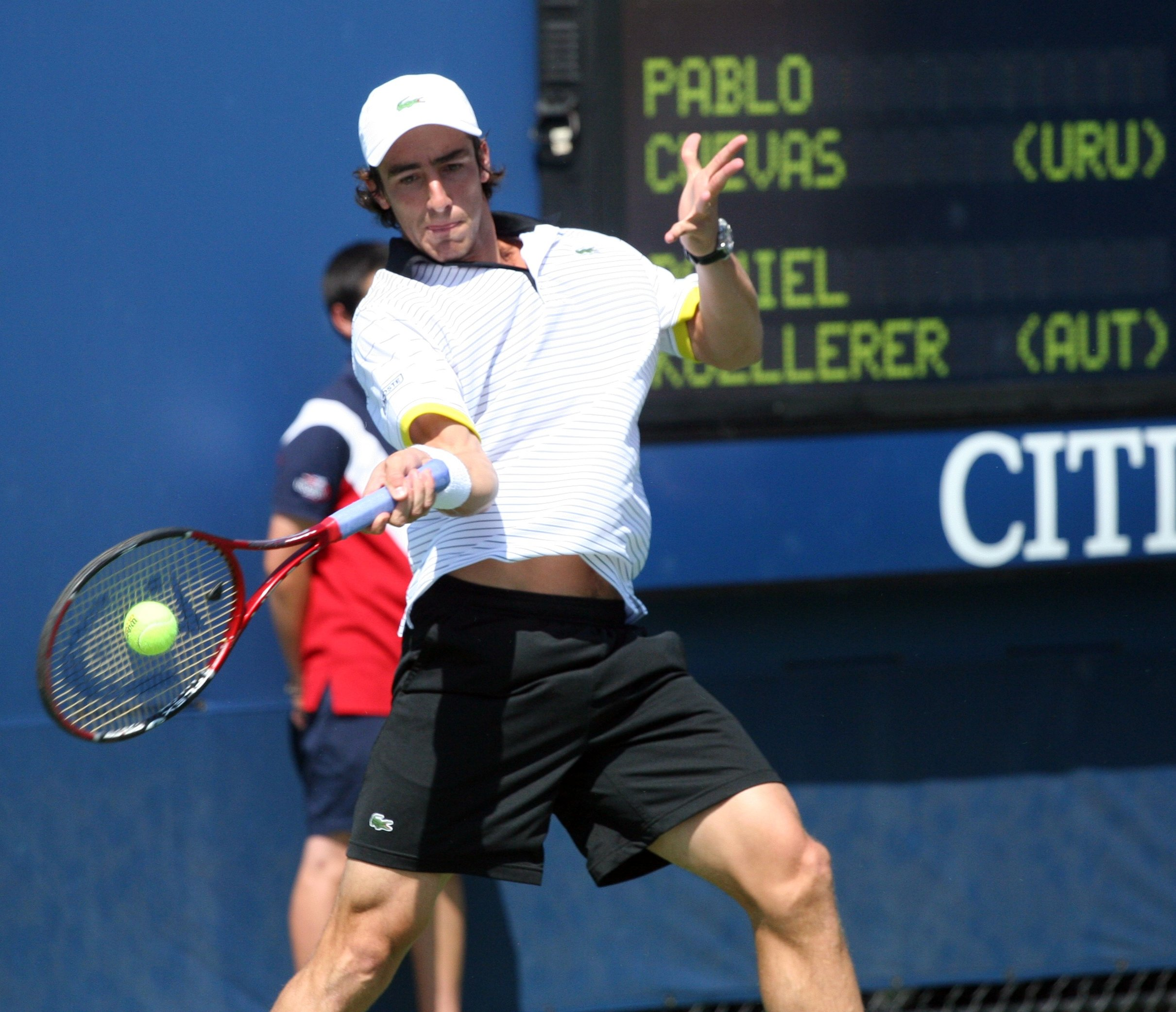
2008 French Open doubles champion Pablo Cuevas titled twice in singles and in doubles.

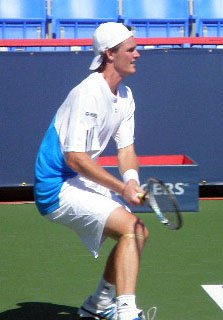
2007 Wimbledon mixed doubles champion Jamie Murray won four doubles titles in 2009.

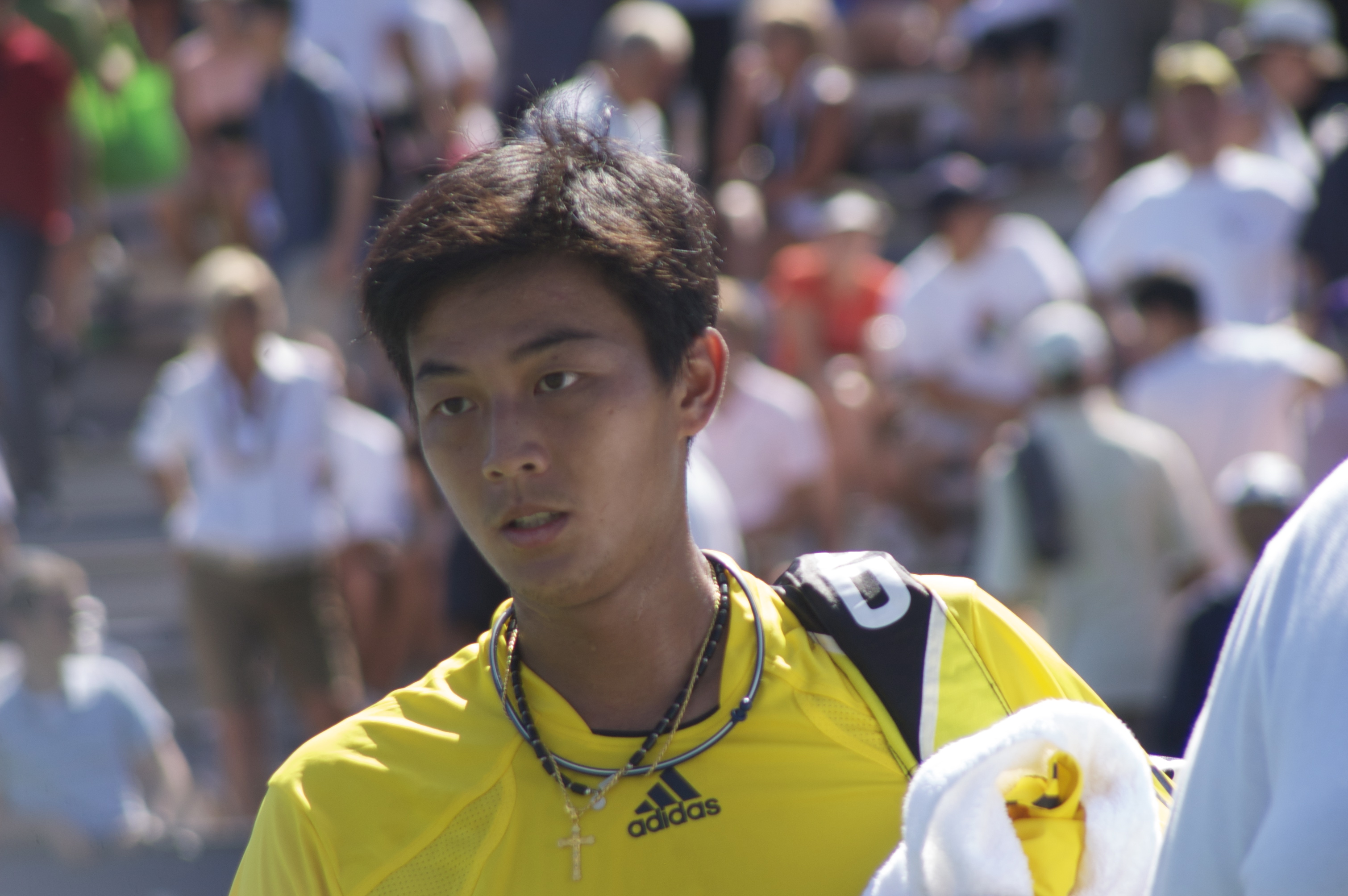
Lu Yen-hsun clinched singles victory twice in Tretorn SERIE+ tournaments.

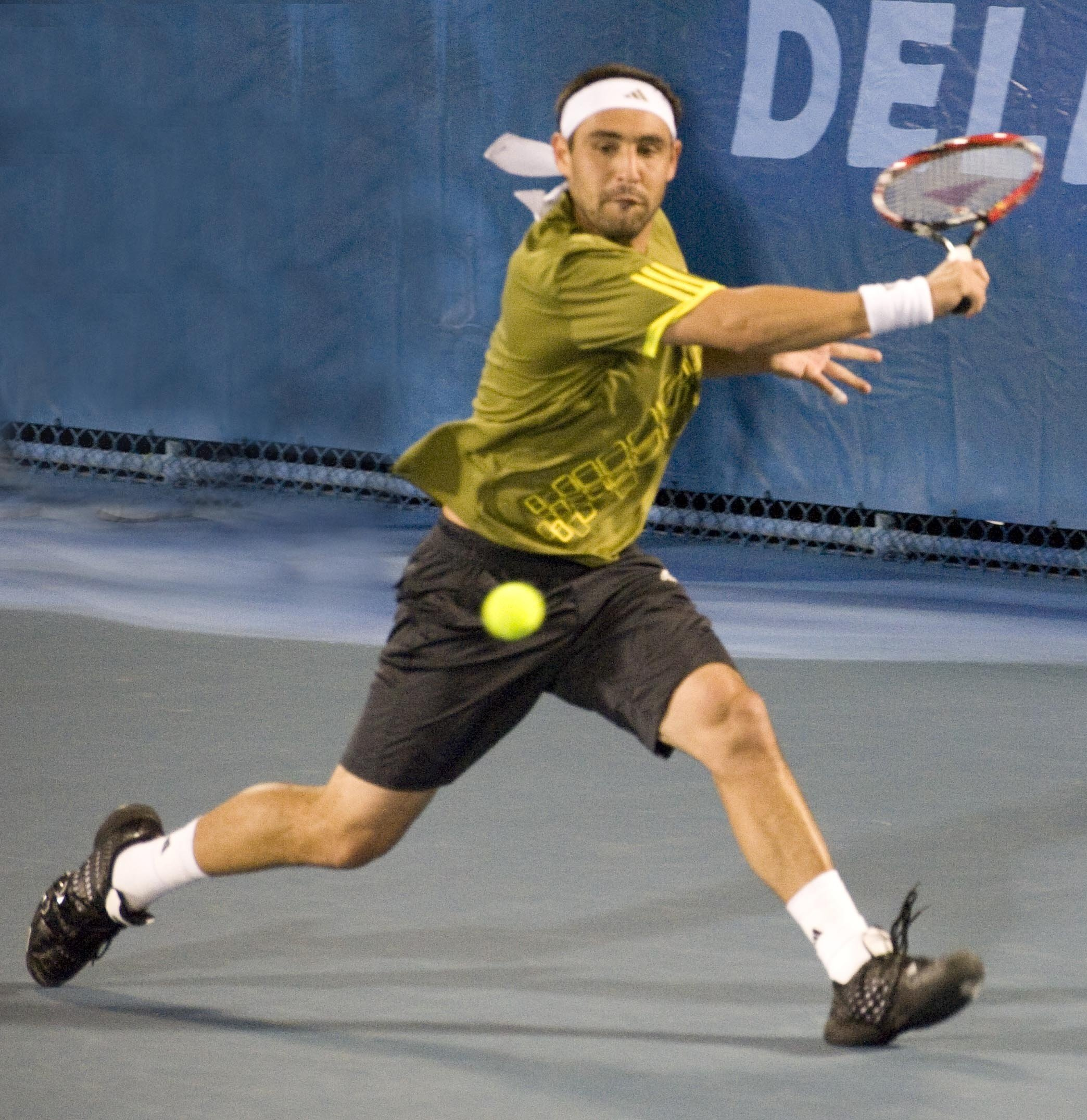
2006 Australian Open finalist Marcos Baghdatis returned to the ATP rankings Top 100 with three singles wins.

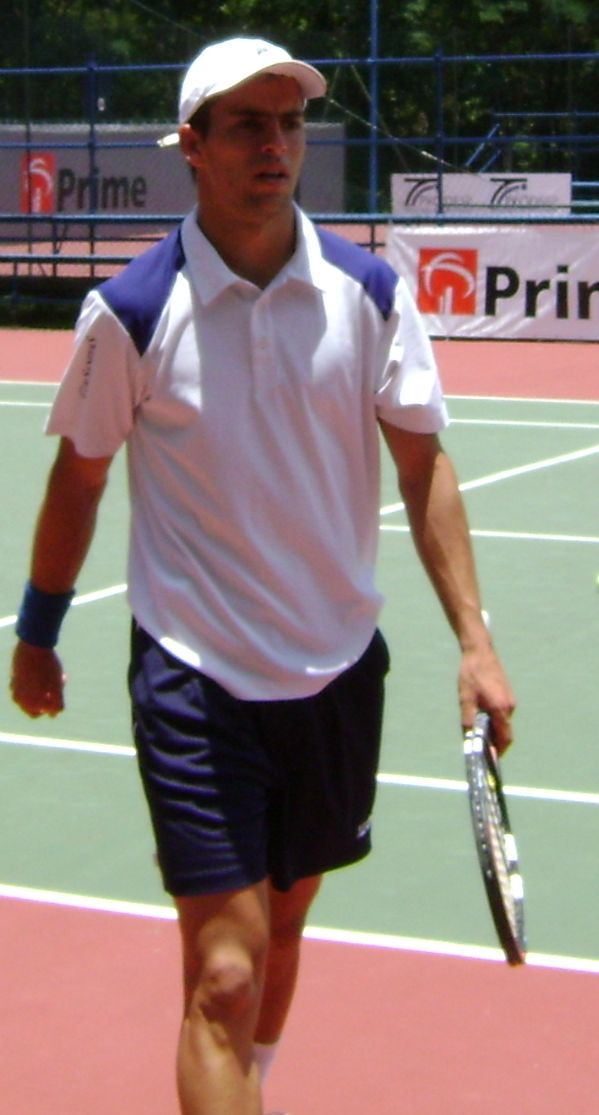
Santiago Giraldo was one of three Colombians to title in singles during the 2009 ATP Challenger Tour.

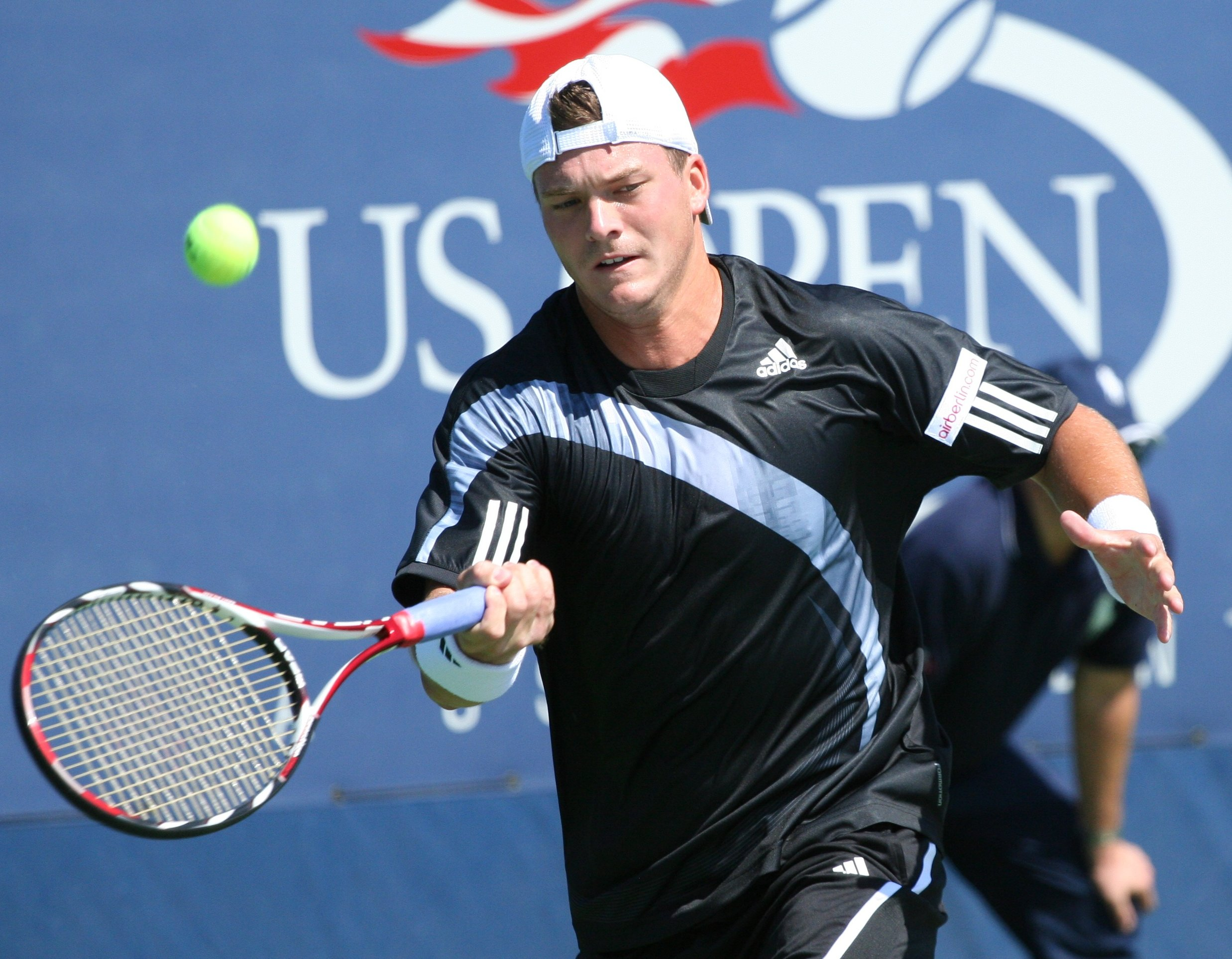
Evgeny Korolev won one singles and one doubles titles in Tretorn SERIE+ tournaments.

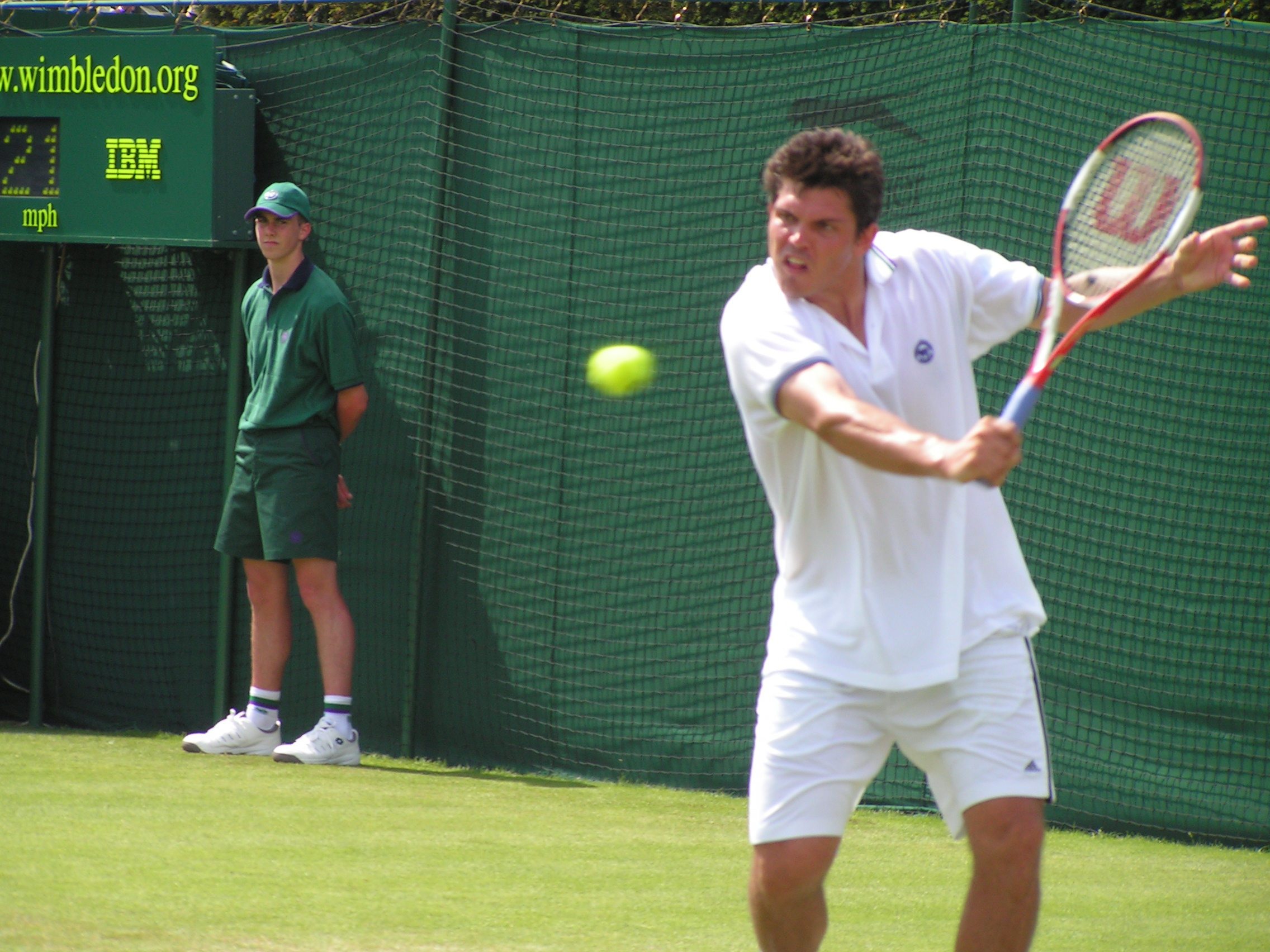
Taylor Dent won two singles titles on the 2009 ATP Challenger Tour.

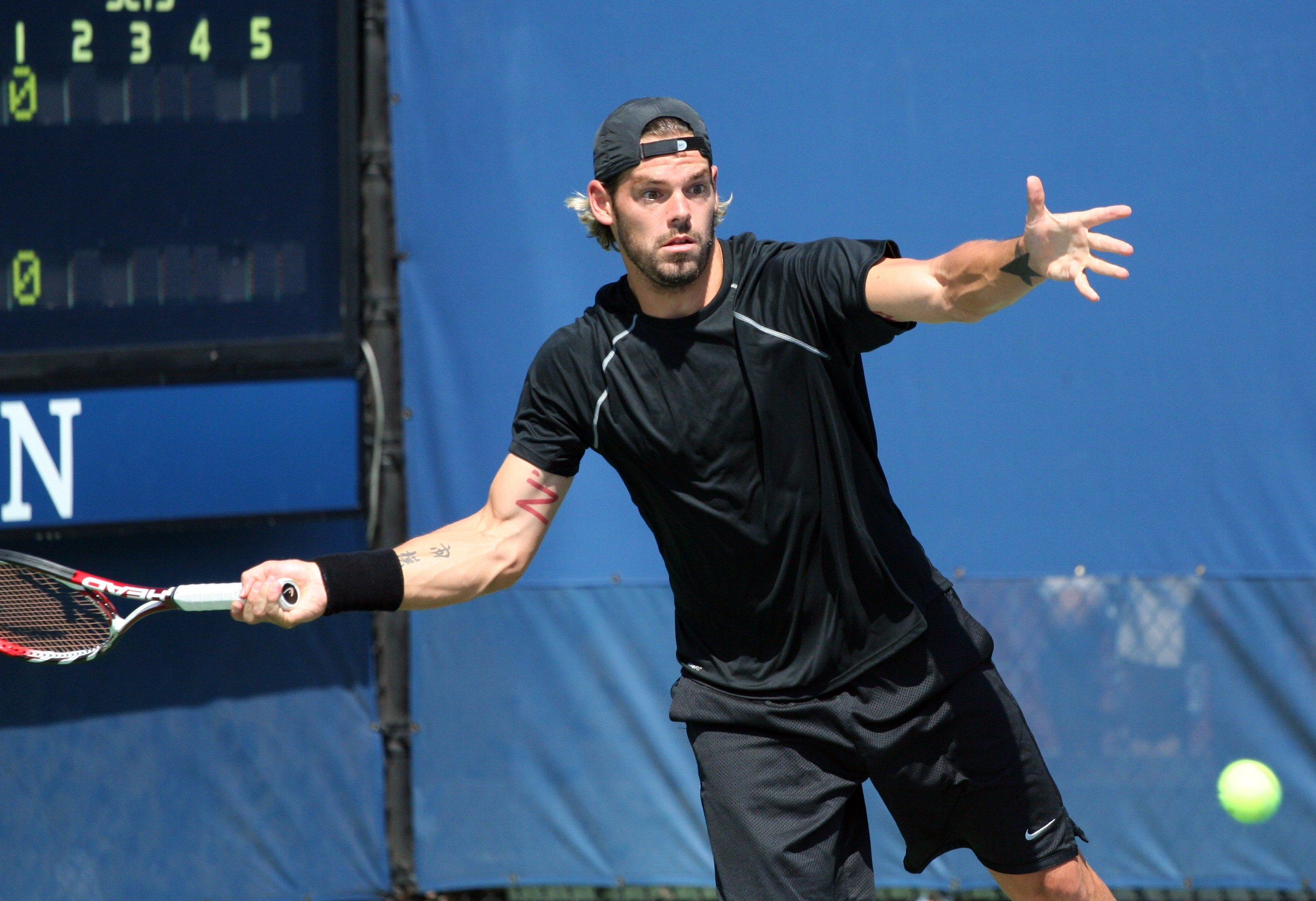
Daniel Köllerer titled twice in singles during the season.

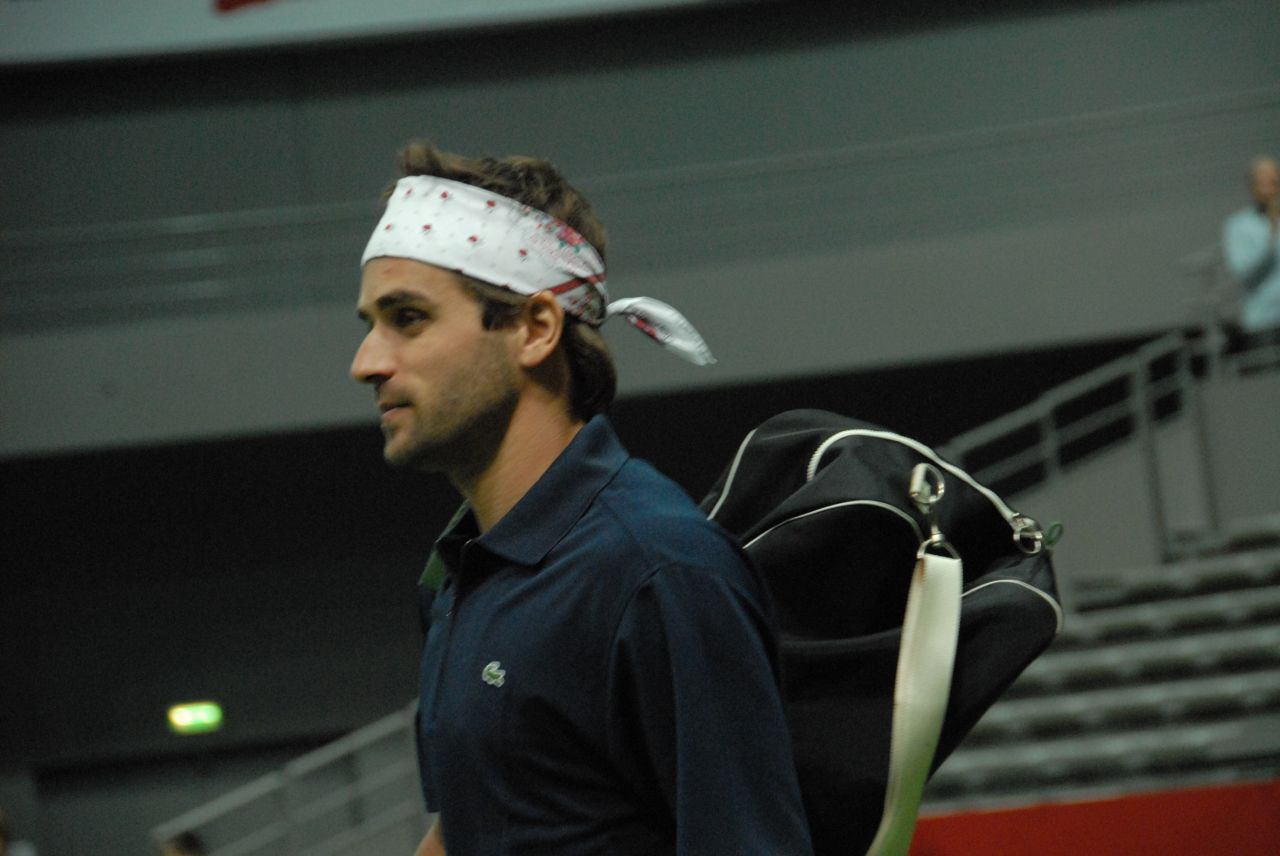
2001 Australian Open runner-up Arnaud Clément completed a singles-doubles sweep in Cherbourg.

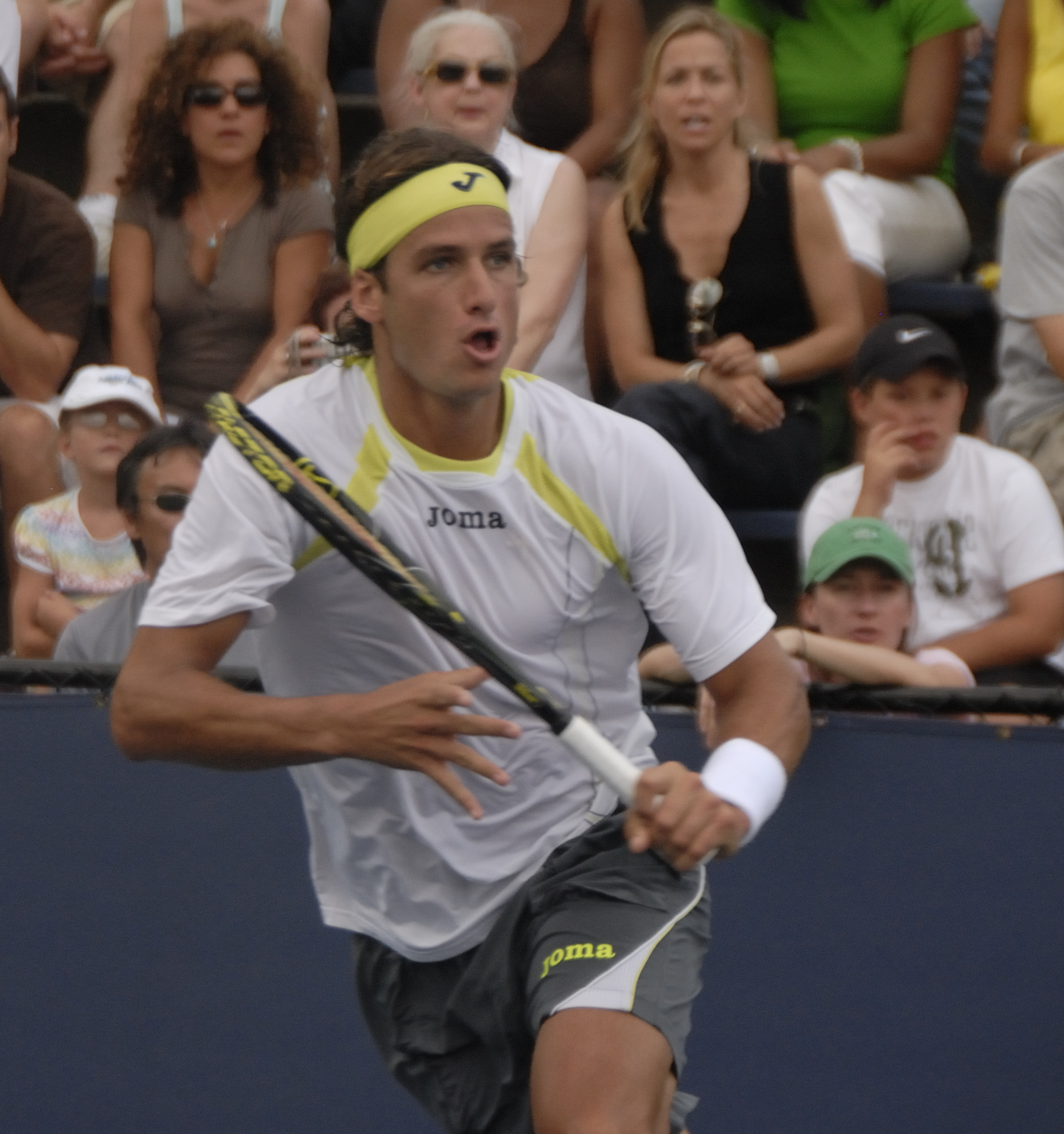
Feliciano López returned to the ATP Challenger Tour to clinch the Segovia singles title.

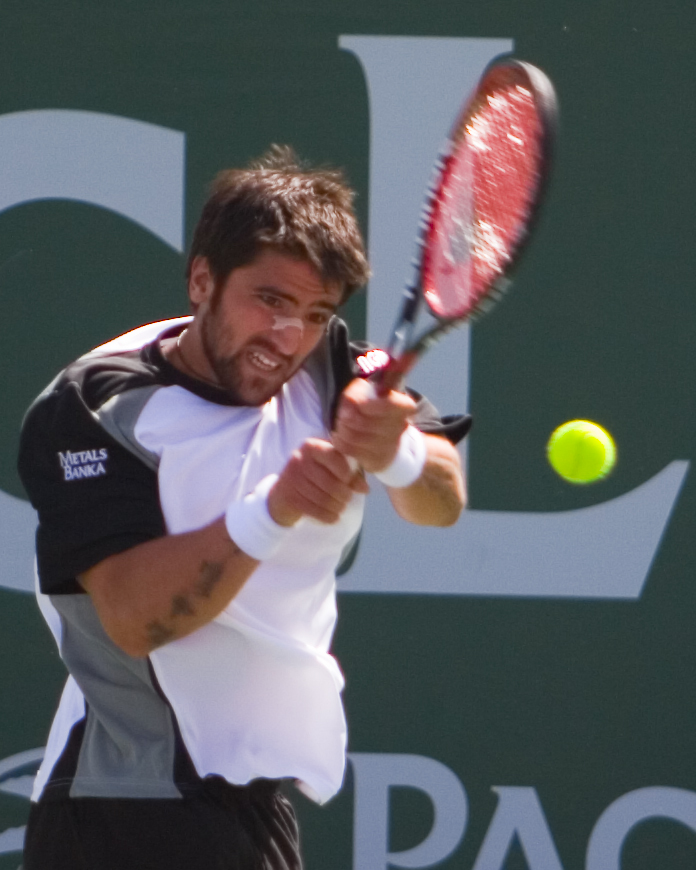
Janko Tipsarević won his first title since 2007 with the Mons singles.

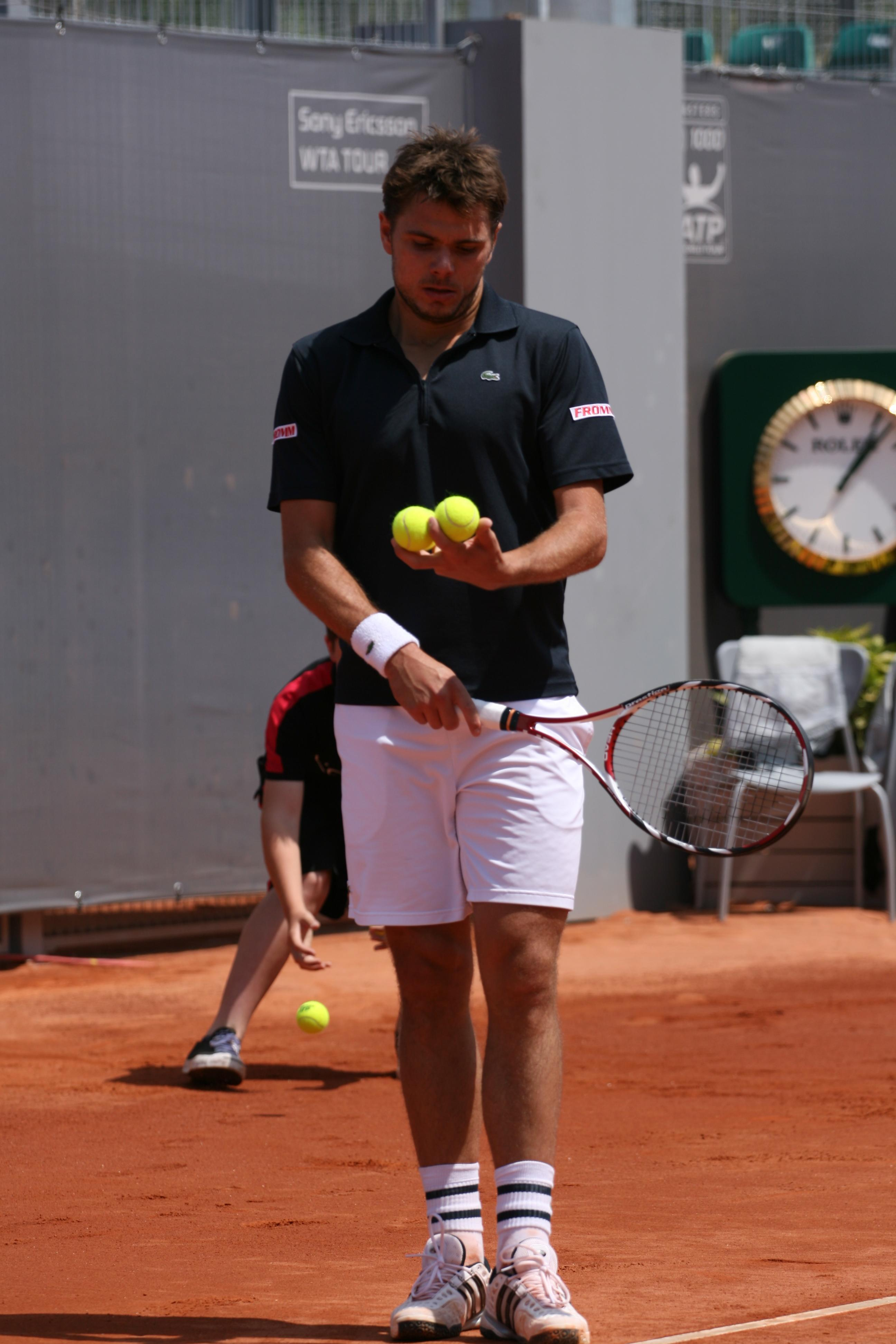
2008 Beijing Olympics gold medalist in doubles Stan Wawrinka took the singles in Lugano.

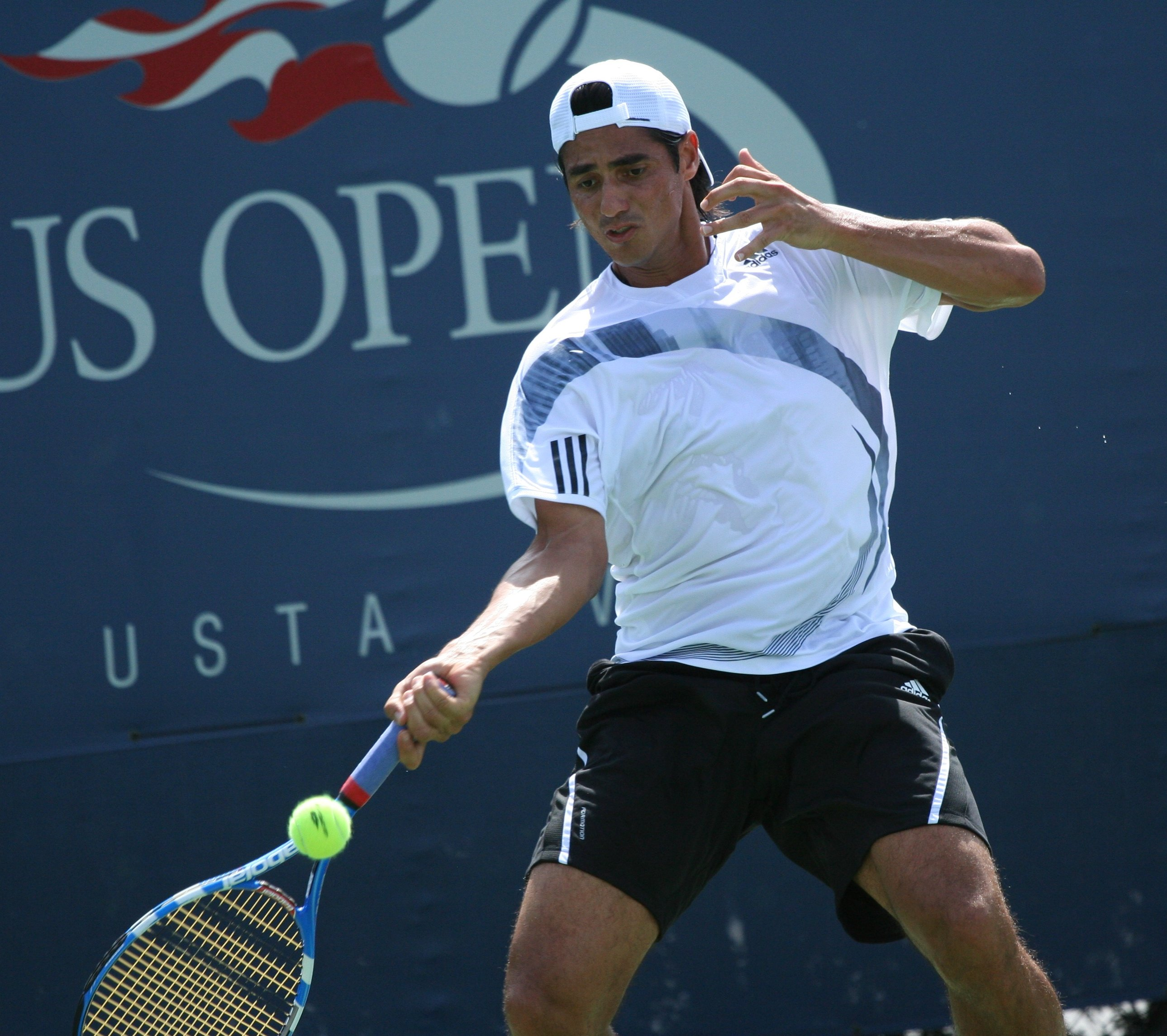
Former World No. 5 Nicolás Lapentti won the singles title in his home tournament of Guayaquil.

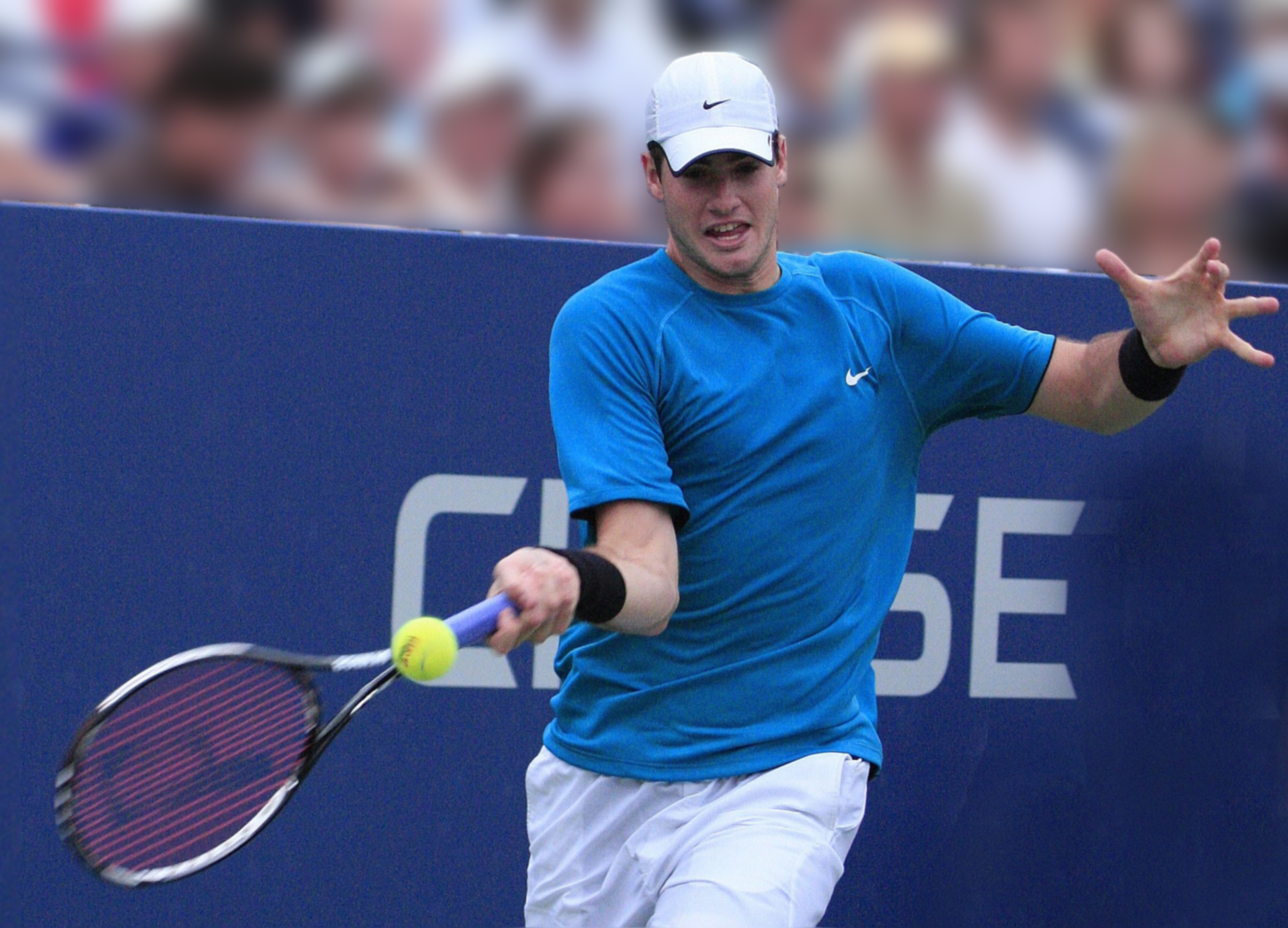
6-feet, 9-inches tall John Isner won his first ATP Challenger Tour singles title in Tallahassee.

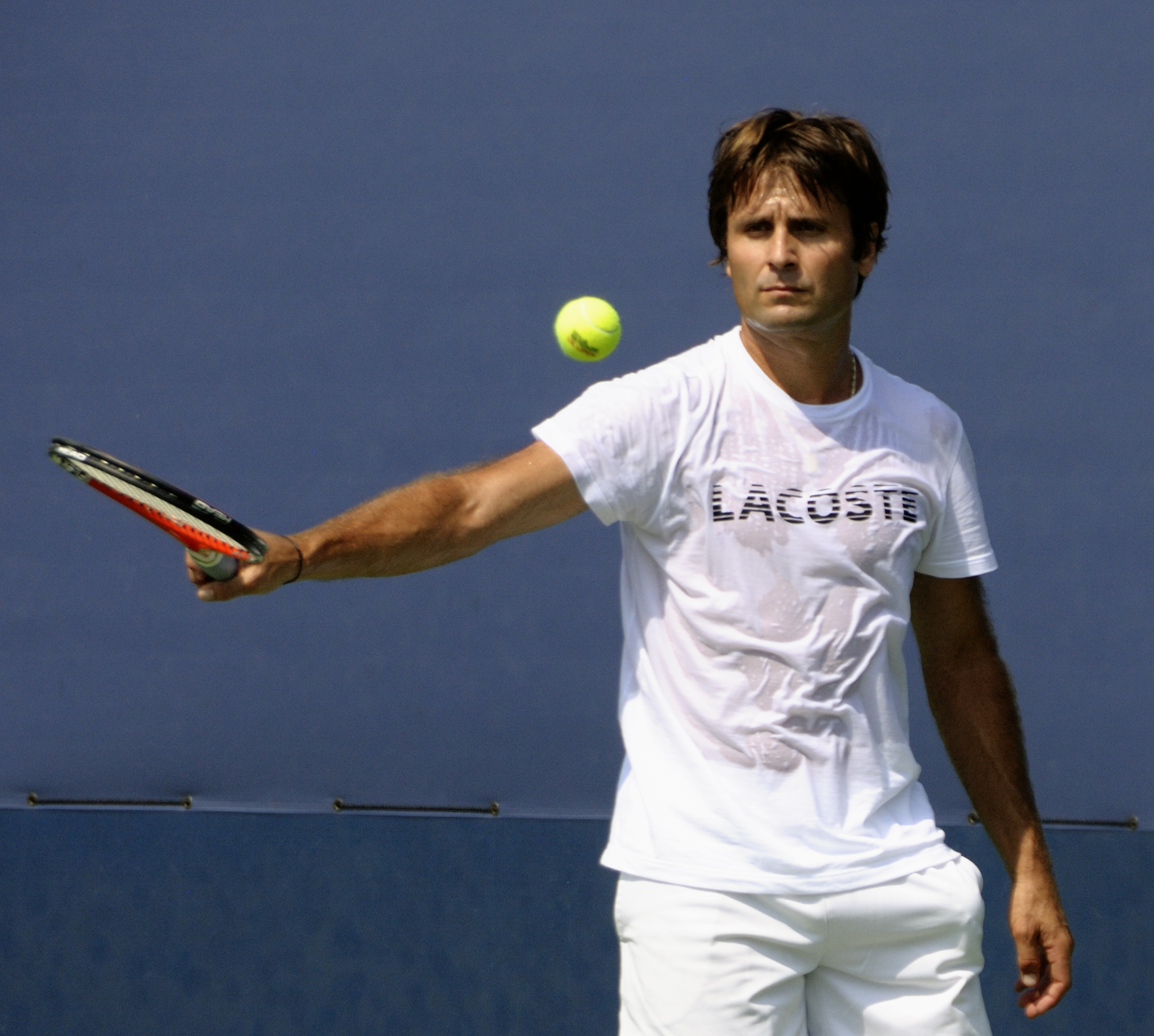
Fabrice Santoro claimed his last career title at the inaugural Johannesburg singles event.

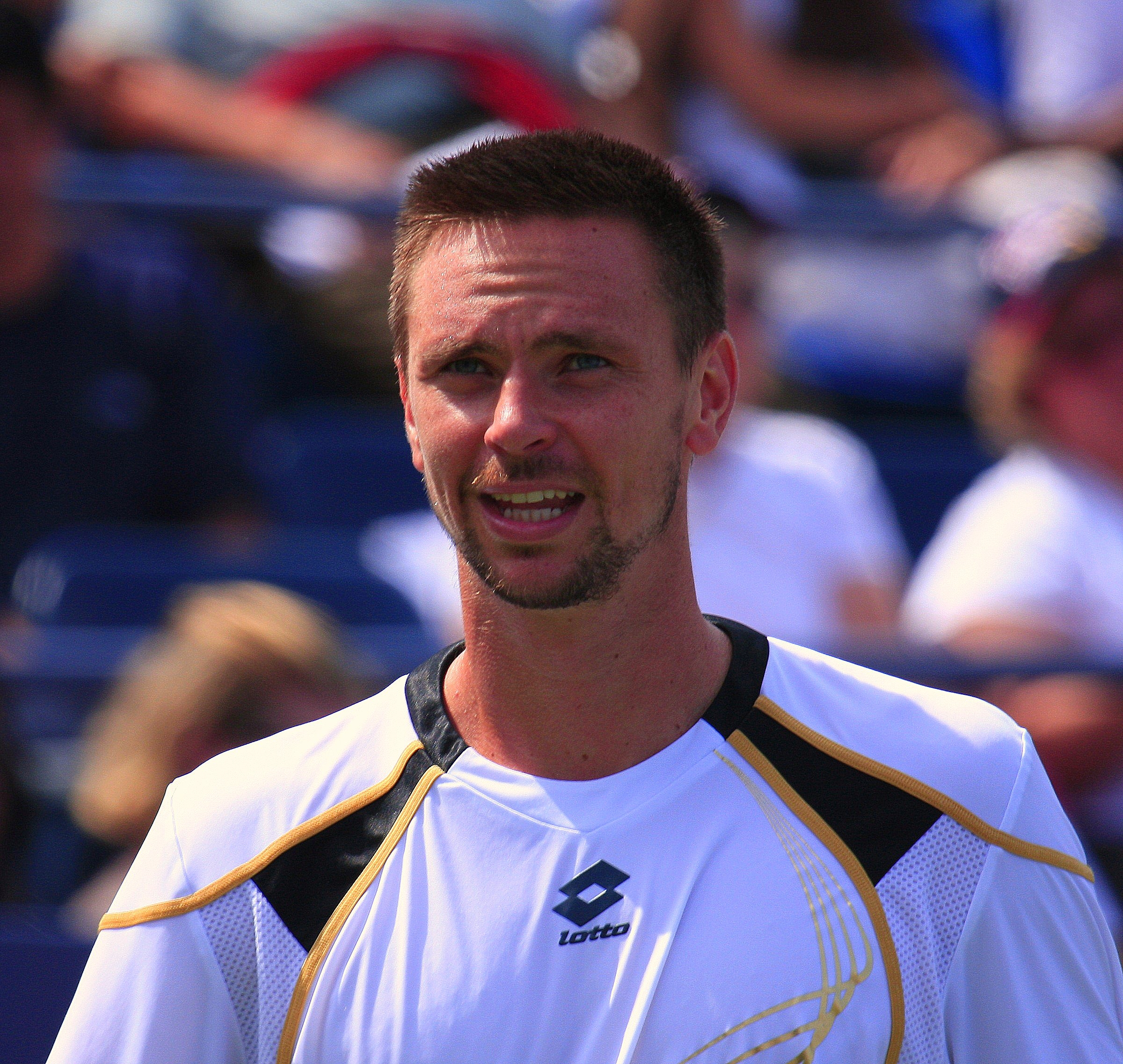
Eventual French Open runner-up Robin Söderling defeated Tomáš Berdych to win the high-profile Sunrise singles final.

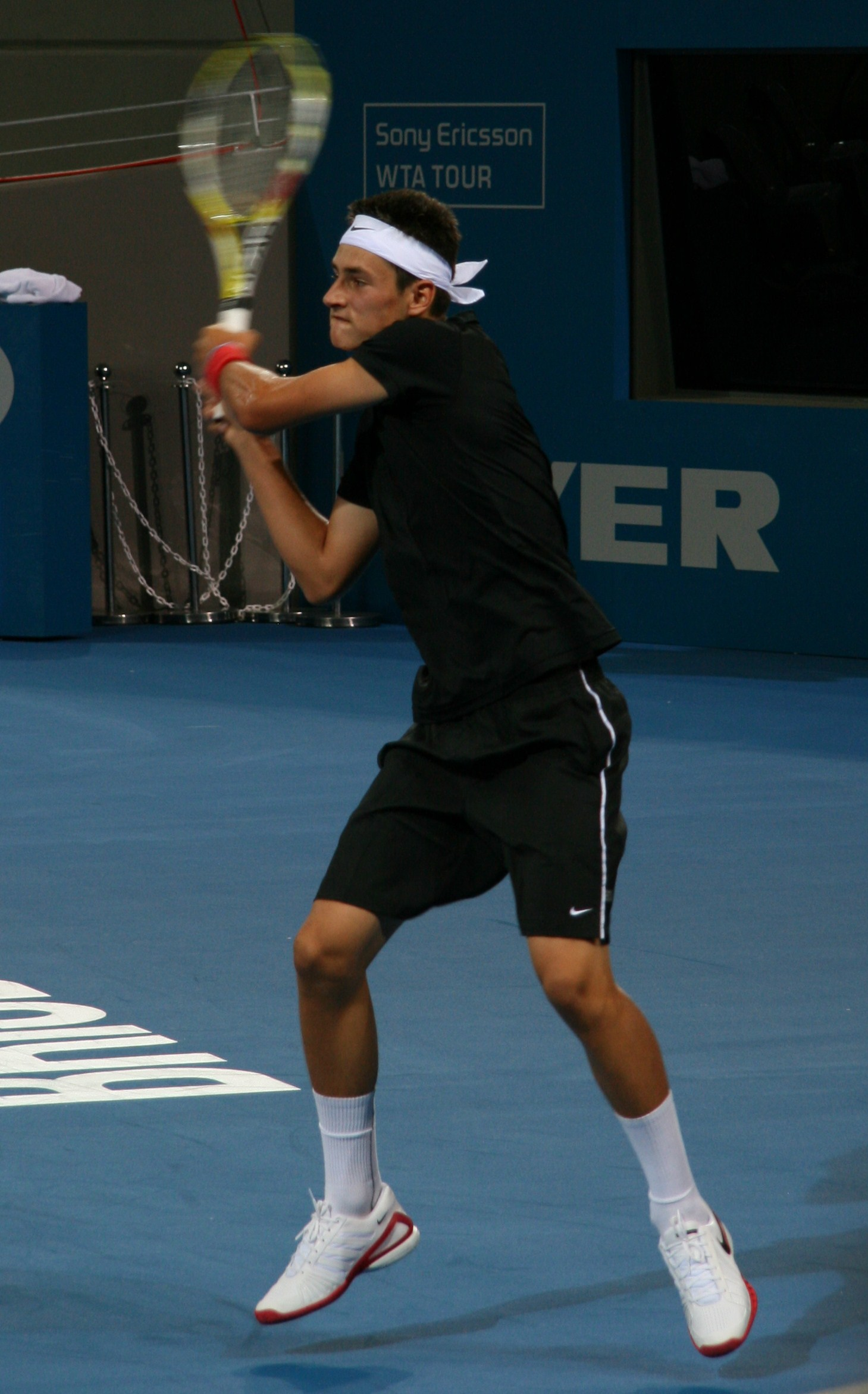
Sixteen-year-old Bernard Tomic claimed his first ATP Challenger Tour singles title in Melbourne.

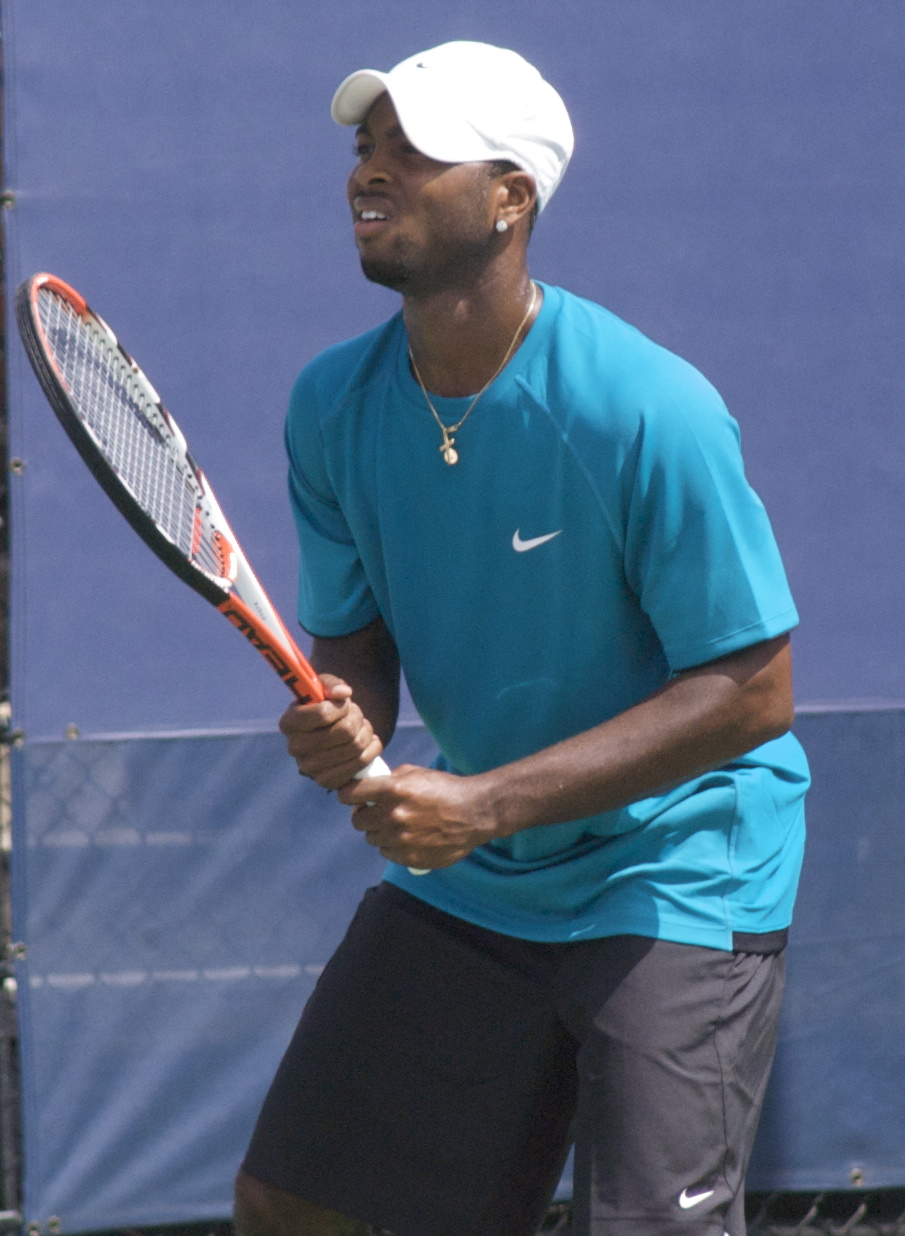
Donald Young's Calabasas singles title was one of 36 American wins during the season.

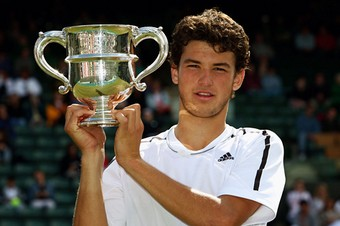
Grigor Dimitrov won his first title at the Challenger level with a victory in the Trnava doubles.

These tables present the number of singles (S) and doubles (D) titles won by each player and each nation during the season, within all the tournament categories of the 2009 ATP Challenger Tour: the Tretorn SERIE+ tournaments, and the regular series tournaments. The players/nations are sorted by: 1) total number of titles (a doubles title won by two players representing the same nation counts as only one win for the nation); 2) cumulated importance of those titles (one Tretorn SERIE+ win > one regular tournament win); 3) a singles > doubles hierarchy; 4) alphabetical order (by family names for players).

=== Key ===
Tretorn SERIE+ tournaments
Regular series tournaments
All titles

=== Titles won by player ===
Total	Player	Tretorn SERIE+		Regular series		Total	
Total	Player	S	D	S	D	S	D
11	Horacio Zeballos (ARG)			5	6	5	6
8	Travis Rettenmaier (USA)		1		7	0	8
7	Rubén Ramírez Hidalgo (ESP)				7	0	7
6	Karol Beck (SVK)	1	4		1	1	5
6	Santiago Ventura (ESP)				6	0	6
5	Jaroslav Levinský (CZE)		4		1	0	5
5	Peter Luczak (AUS)	2		1	2	3	2
5	Philipp Marx (GER)		2		3	0	5
5	Sebastián Prieto (ARG)		1		4	0	5
5	Sanchai Ratiwatana (THA)		1		4	0	5
5	Sonchat Ratiwatana (THA)		1		4	0	5
5	Thiemo de Bakker (NED)			4	1	4	1
5	Jan Hájek (CZE)			3	2	3	2
5	David Marrero (ESP)			1	4	1	4
5	Eric Butorac (USA)				5	0	5
4	Benjamin Becker (GER)	2		2		4	0
4	Chris Guccione (AUS)		1	1	2	1	3
4	Johan Brunström (SWE)		1		3	0	4
4	Jean-Julien Rojer (AHO)		1		3	0	4
4	Alejandro Falla (COL)			3	1	3	1
4	Paolo Lorenzi (ITA)			3	1	3	1
4	Pablo Cuevas (URU)			2	2	2	2
4	Eduardo Schwank (ARG)			2	2	2	2
4	Rajeev Ram (USA)			1	3	1	3
4	Carsten Ball (AUS)				4	0	4
4	Santiago González (MEX)				4	0	4
4	Scott Lipsky (USA)				4	0	4
4	David Martin (USA)				4	0	4
4	Alessandro Motti (ITA)				4	0	4
4	Jamie Murray (GBR)				4	0	4
4	Aisam-ul-Haq Qureshi (PAK)				4	0	4
4	Ken Skupski (GBR)				4	0	4
3	Yen-hsun Lu (TPE)	2	1			2	1
3	Michael Berrer (GER)	2		1		3	0
3	Lukáš Lacko (SVK)	1		1	1	2	1
3	Máximo González (ARG)		1	2		2	1
3	Tomasz Bednarek (POL)		1		2	0	3
3	Daniele Bracciali (ITA)		1		2	0	3
3	Rik de Voest (RSA)		1		2	0	3
3	Mateusz Kowalczyk (POL)		1		2	0	3
3	Marcos Baghdatis (CYP)			3		3	0
3	Marcos Daniel (BRA)			3		3	0
3	Alexandr Dolgopolov (UKR)			3		3	0
3	Santiago Giraldo (COL)			3		3	0
3	Michael Russell (USA)			3		3	0
3	Ricardo Mello (BRA)			2	1	2	1
3	Kevin Anderson (RSA)			1	2	1	2
3	Sebastián Decoud (ARG)			1	2	1	2
3	Marcelo Demoliner (BRA)			1	2	1	2
3	Fred Gil (POR)			1	2	1	2
3	Simon Greul (GER)			1	2	1	2
3	Pere Riba (ESP)			1	2	1	2
3	Rohan Bopanna (IND)				3	0	3
3	Martin Fischer (AUT)				3	0	3
3	Colin Fleming (GBR)				3	0	3
3	Josh Goodall (GBR)				3	0	3
3	Harsh Mankad (IND)				3	0	3
3	Jonathan Marray (GBR)				3	0	3
3	Frederik Nielsen (DEN)				3	0	3
3	Philipp Oswald (AUT)				3	0	3
3	Joseph Sirianni (AUS)				3	0	3
2	Evgeny Korolev (KAZ)	1	1			1	1
2	Potito Starace (ITA)	1	1			1	1
2	Lucas Arnold Ker (ARG)		2			0	2
2	Kristof Vliegen (BEL)	1		1		2	0
2	George Bastl (SUI)		1		1	0	2
2	Brian Dabul (ARG)		1		1	0	2
2	Denis Istomin (UZB)		1		1	0	2
2	Andis Juška (LAT)		1		1	0	2
2	Michael Kohlmann (GER)		1		1	0	2
2	Leonardo Mayer (ARG)		1		1	0	2
2	Sergio Roitman (ARG)		1		1	0	2
2	Édouard Roger-Vasselin (FRA)		1		1	0	2
2	Dmitri Sitak (RUS)		1		1	0	2
2	Igor Zelenay (SVK)		1		1	0	2
2	Thomaz Bellucci (BRA)			2		2	0
2	Ramón Delgado (PAR)			2		2	0
2	Taylor Dent (USA)			2		2	0
2	Brendan Evans (USA)			2		2	0
2	Daniel Gimeno Traver (ESP)			2		2	0
2	Blaž Kavčič (SLO)			2		2	0
2	Daniel Köllerer (AUT)			2		2	0
2	Rui Machado (POR)			2		2	0
2	Xavier Malisse (BEL)			2		2	0
2	Florian Mayer (GER)			2		2	0
2	Ivo Minář (CZE)			2		2	0
2	Laurent Recouderc (FRA)			2		2	0
2	Stéphane Robert (FRA)			2		2	0
2	Carlos Salamanca (COL)			2		2	0
2	Dustin Brown (JAM)			1	1	1	1
2	Arnaud Clément (FRA)			1	1	1	1
2	Ryler DeHeart (USA)			1	1	1	1
2	Alessio di Mauro (ITA)			1	1	1	1
2	Ivan Dodig (CRO)			1	1	1	1
2	Rainer Eitzinger (AUT)			1	1	1	1
2	Konstantin Kravchuk (RUS)			1	1	1	1
2	Harel Levy (ISR)			1	1	1	1
2	Marc López (ESP)			1	1	1	1
2	Robin Vik (CZE)			1	1	1	1
2	Diego Álvarez (ARG)				2	0	2
2	Juan-Martín Aranguren (ARG)				2	0	2
2	Juan Pablo Brzezicki (ARG)				2	0	2
2	Jamie Delgado (GBR)				2	0	2
2	Martin Emmrich (GER)				2	0	2
2	Mikhail Elgin (RUS)				2	0	2
2	Víctor Estrella Burgos (DOM)				2	0	2
2	Rodrigo Guidolin (BRA)				2	0	2
2	Treat Huey (PHI)				2	0	2
2	Rameez Junaid (AUS)				2	0	2
2	Sadik Kadir (AUS)				2	0	2
2	Dieter Kindlmann (GER)				2	0	2
2	Alexander Kudryavtsev (RUS)				2	0	2
2	Miguel Ángel López Jaén (ESP)				2	0	2
2	Alexander Peya (AUT)				2	0	2
2	Bobby Reynolds (USA)				2	0	2
2	Pablo Santos (ESP)				2	0	2
2	Yuri Schukin (KAZ)				2	0	2
2	Andreas Siljeström (SWE)				2	0	2
2	Simon Stadler (GER)				2	0	2
2	Tsung-hua Yang (TPE)				2	0	2
1	Gastón Gaudio (ARG)	1				1	0
1	Feliciano López (ESP)	1				1	0
1	Lukáš Rosol (CZE)	1				1	0
1	Andreas Seppi (ITA)	1				1	0
1	Janko Tipsarević (SRB)	1				1	0
1	Viktor Troicki (SRB)	1				1	0
1	Stan Wawrinka (SUI)	1				1	0
1	James Cerretani (USA)		1			0	1
1	Nicolas Mahut (FRA)		1			0	1
1	Alexandre Sidorenko (FRA)		1			0	1
1	Andreas Beck (GER)			1		1	0
1	Ruben Bemelmans (BEL)			1		1	0
1	Alex Bogdanovic (GBR)			1		1	0
1	Stéphane Bohli (SUI)			1		1	0
1	Daniel Brands (GER)			1		1	0
1	Sergei Bubka (UKR)			1		1	0
1	Paul Capdeville (CHI)			1		1	0
1	Íñigo Cervantes (ESP)			1		1	0
1	Juan Ignacio Chela (ARG)			1		1	0
1	Marco Chiudinelli (SUI)			1		1	0
1	Federico Delbonis (ARG)			1		1	0
1	Dan Evans (GBR)			1		1	0
1	Fabio Fognini (ITA)			1		1	0
1	Marc Gicquel (FRA)			1		1	0
1	Andrey Golubev (KAZ)			1		1	0
1	Óscar Hernández (ESP)			1		1	0
1	Jesse Huta Galung (NED)			1		1	0
1	Uladzimir Ignatik (BLR)			1		1	0
1	John Isner (USA)			1		1	0
1	Kevin Kim (USA)			1		1	0
1	Brydan Klein (AUS)			1		1	0
1	Mikhail Kukushkin (KAZ)			1		1	0
1	Alex Kuznetsov (USA)			1		1	0
1	Nicolás Lapentti (ECU)			1		1	0
1	Illya Marchenko (UKR)			1		1	0
1	Alberto Martín (ESP)			1		1	0
1	Nicolás Massú (CHI)			1		1	0
1	Dominik Meffert (GER)			1		1	0
1	Jarkko Nieminen (FIN)			1		1	0
1	Dick Norman (BEL)			1		1	0
1	Wayne Odesnik (USA)			1		1	0
1	Josselin Ouanna (FRA)			1		1	0
1	Michał Przysiężny (POL)			1		1	0
1	Guillaume Rufin (FRA)			1		1	0
1	Olivier Rochus (BEL)			1		1	0
1	Fabrice Santoro (FRA)			1		1	0
1	Ivan Sergeyev (UKR)			1		1	0
1	Júlio Silva (BRA)			1		1	0
1	Robin Söderling (SWE)			1		1	0
1	Go Soeda (JPN)			1		1	0
1	Andrea Stoppini (ITA)			1		1	0
1	Takao Suzuki (JPN)			1		1	0
1	Ryan Sweeting (USA)			1		1	0
1	Bernard Tomic (AUS)			1		1	0
1	Danai Udomchoke (THA)			1		1	0
1	Adrian Ungur (ROU)			1		1	0
1	Donald Young (USA)			1		1	0
1	James Ward (GBR)			1		1	0
1	Yves Allegro (SUI)				1	0	1
1	Martín Alund (ARG)				1	0	1
1	Prakash Amritraj (IND)				1	0	1
1	Miles Armstrong (AUS)				1	0	1
1	James Auckland (GBR)				1	0	1
1	Matthias Bachinger (GER)				1	0	1
1	Brian Battistone (USA)				1	0	1
1	Dann Battistone (USA)				1	0	1
1	Andre Begemann (GER)				1	0	1
1	Carlos Berlocq (ARG)				1	0	1
1	Julio César Campozano (ECU)				1	0	1
1	Pavel Chekhov (RUS)				1	0	1
1	Lester Cook (USA)				1	0	1
1	Diego Cristin (ARG)				1	0	1
1	Marco Crugnola (ITA)				1	0	1
1	Grigor Dimitrov (BUL)				1	0	1
1	Jonathan Erlich (ISR)				1	0	1
1	Jonathan Eysseric (FRA)				1	0	1
1	Franco Ferreiro (BRA)				1	0	1
1	Teymuraz Gabashvili (RUS)				1	0	1
1	Adrián García (CHI)				1	0	1
1	Augustin Gensse (FRA)				1	0	1
1	Emilio Gómez (ECU)				1	0	1
1	Alejandro González (COL)				1	0	1
1	Marcel Granollers (ESP)				1	0	1
1	Gerard Granollers (ESP)				1	0	1
1	Sam Groth (AUS)				1	0	1
1	Kaden Hensel (AUS)				1	0	1
1	Ricardo Hocevar (BRA)				1	0	1
1	Dominik Hrbatý (SVK)				1	0	1
1	Adam Hubble (AUS)				1	0	1
1	Stefano Ianni (ITA)				1	0	1
1	Murad Inoyatov (UZB)				1	0	1
1	Romain Jouan (FRA)				1	0	1
1	Dušan Karol (CZE)				1	0	1
1	Christopher Kas (GER)				1	0	1
1	Alexey Kedryuk (KAZ)				1	0	1
1	Evgeny Kirillov (RUS)				1	0	1
1	Jiří Krkoška (CZE)				1	0	1
1	André Miele (BRA)				1	0	1
1	Denys Molchanov (UKR)				1	0	1
1	Dawid Olejniczak (POL)				1	0	1
1	Lamine Ouahab (ALG)				1	0	1
1	Giancarlo Petrazzuolo (ITA)				1	0	1
1	Philipp Petzschner (GER)				1	0	1
1	Carles Poch Gradin (ESP)				1	0	1
1	Vasek Pospisil (CAN)				1	0	1
1	Filip Prpic (SWE)				1	0	1
1	Éric Prodon (FRA)				1	0	1
1	Purav Raja (IND)				1	0	1
1	José Antonio Sánchez de Luna (ESP)				1	0	1
1	Adil Shamasdin (CAN)				1	0	1
1	David Škoch (CZE)				1	0	1
1	Martin Slanar (AUT)				1	0	1
1	Raemon Sluiter (NED)				1	0	1
1	João Souza (BRA)				1	0	1
1	Leonardo Tavares (POR)				1	0	1
1	Márcio Torres (BRA)				1	0	1
1	Gabriel Trujillo Soler (ESP)				1	0	1
1	Simone Vagnozzi (ITA)				1	0	1
1	Izak van der Merwe (RSA)				1	0	1
1	Cristian Villagrán (ARG)				1	0	1
1	Chu-huan Yi (TPE)				1	0	1
1	Marcel Zimmermann (GER)				1	0	1
1	Lovro Zovko (CRO)				1	0	1

=== Titles won by nation ===
Total	Nation	Tretorn SERIE+		Regular series		Total	
Total	Nation	S	D	S	D	S	D
36	United States (USA)		1	15	20	15	21
34	Argentina (ARG)	1	4	12	17	13	21
29	Germany (GER)	4	2	9	14	13	16
27	Spain (ESP)	1		8	18	9	18
23	Australia (AUS)	2	1	4	16	6	17
17	Italy (ITA)	2	1	6	8	8	9
16	Czech Republic (CZE)	1	4	6	5	7	9
15	Brazil (BRA)			9	6	9	6
15	Great Britain (GBR)			3	12	3	12
14	France (FRA)		2	9	3	9	5
12	Slovakia (SVK)	2	5	1	4	3	9
11	Russia (RUS)	1	2	1	7	2	9
10	Austria (AUT)			3	7	3	7
9	Colombia (COL)			8	1	8	1
8	Sweden (SWE)		1	1	6	1	7
8	India (IND)				8	0	8
7	Belgium (BEL)	1		6		7	0
7	Ukraine (UKR)			6	1	6	1
6	Switzerland (SUI)	1	1	2	2	3	3
6	South Africa (RSA)		1	1	4	1	5
6	Thailand (THA)		1	1	4	1	5
6	Netherlands (NED)			5	1	5	1
6	Portugal (POR)			3	3	3	3
5	Chinese Taipei (TPE)	2	1		2	2	3
5	Poland (POL)		1	1	3	1	4
5	Kazakhstan (KAZ)			2	3	2	3
4	Netherlands Antilles (AHO)		1		3	0	4
4	Uruguay (URU)			2	2	2	2
4	Mexico (MEX)				4	0	4
4	Pakistan (PAK)				4	0	4
3	Cyprus (CYP)			3		3	0
3	Chile (CHI)			2	1	2	1
3	Croatia (CRO)			1	2	1	2
3	Denmark (DEN)				3	0	3
2	Serbia (SRB)	2				2	0
2	Latvia (LAT)		1		1	0	2
2	Uzbekistan (UZB)		1		1	0	2
2	Japan (JPN)			2		2	0
2	Paraguay (PAR)			2		2	0
2	Slovenia (SLO)			2		2	0
2	Ecuador (ECU)			1	1	1	1
2	Israel (ISR)			1	1	1	1
2	Jamaica (JAM)			1	1	1	1
2	Dominican Republic (DOM)				2	0	2
2	Philippines (PHI)				2	0	2
1	Belarus (BLR)			1		1	0
1	Finland (FIN)			1		1	0
1	Romania (ROU)			1		1	0
1	Algeria (ALG)				1	0	1
1	Bulgaria (BUL)				1	0	1
1	Canada (CAN)				1	0	1

== See also ==
- 2009 ITF Women's Circuit
- 2009 ATP World Tour
- 2009 WTA Tour
- Association of Tennis Professionals
- International Tennis Federation
