= 2009 Baden Open – Doubles =

Doubles
- 2009 Baden Open

Final
- Champions: (Australia) Rameez Junaid (Germany) Philipp Marx
- Runners-up: (Poland) Tomasz Bednarek (Pakistan) Aisam-ul-Haq Qureshi
- Score: 7–5, 6–4

Events
Singles	Doubles
← 2008 ·	Baden Open	· 2010 →

Daniel Köllerer and Frank Moser were the defending champions, but they didn't play this year.
Rameez Junaid and Philipp Marx won in the final 7–5, 6–4, against Tomasz Bednarek and Aisam-ul-Haq Qureshi.

== Seeds ==
1. (Australia) Rameez Junaid / (Germany) Philipp Marx (champions)
2. (Poland) Tomasz Bednarek / (Pakistan) Aisam-ul-Haq Qureshi (final)
3. (France) Olivier Charroin / (France) Nicolas Tourte (first round)
4. (Ukraine) Sergei Bubka / (Russia) Denis Matsukevich (semifinals)

== Draw ==
=== Key ===
- Q = Qualifier
- WC = Wild card
- LL = Lucky loser
- Alt = Alternate
- SE = Special exempt
- PR = Protected ranking
- ITF = ITF entry
- JE = Junior exempt
- w/o = Walkover
- r = Retired
- d = Defaulted
- SR = Special ranking

=== Draw ===
First round
1	(Australia) R Junaid (Germany) P Marx	6	6
WC	(Germany) P Krumm (Germany) F Scheuble	0	1
(Australia) P Luczak (Australia) J Sirianni	6	4	[10]
(Jamaica) D Brown (Belgium) N Desein	3	6	[8]
3	(France) O Charroin (France) N Tourte	1	0
WC	(Germany) F Mayer (Germany) M Meigel	6	6
(Romania) G Moraru (Serbia) B Pašanski	6	2	[10]
(Czech Republic) D Karol (Czech Republic) J Pospíšil	2	6	[5]
(Germany) T Kamke (Germany) J Reister	6	6
WC	(Germany) Y Hanfmann (Germany) M Lenz	3	1
(Argentina) JP Brzezicki (Brazil) J Souza	5	1
4	(Ukraine) S Bubka (Russia) D Matsukevich	7	6
(Spain) MÁ López Jaén (Spain) P Riba	6	6
(United States) A Delic (United States) B Evans	4	4
(Lithuania) R Berankis (Germany) O Strecker	4	3
2	(Poland) T Bednarek (Pakistan) A-u-H Qureshi	6	6

Quarterfinals
1	(Australia) R Junaid (Germany) P Marx	4	6	[10]
(Australia) P Luczak (Australia) J Sirianni	6	2	[5]
WC	(Germany) F Mayer (Germany) M Meigel	7	7
(Romania) G Moraru (Serbia) B Pašanski	5	5
(Germany) T Kamke (Germany) J Reister	4	2
4	(Ukraine) S Bubka (Russia) D Matsukevich	6	6
(Spain) MÁ López Jaén (Spain) P Riba	2	3
2	(Poland) T Bednarek (Pakistan) A-u-H Qureshi	6	6

Semifinals
1	(Australia) R Junaid (Germany) P Marx	7	4	[10]
WC	(Germany) F Mayer (Germany) M Meigel	5	6	[4]
4	(Ukraine) S Bubka (Russia) D Matsukevich	3	5
2	(Poland) T Bednarek (Pakistan) A-u-H Qureshi	6	7

Finals
1	(Australia) R Junaid (Germany) P Marx	7	6
2	(Poland) T Bednarek (Pakistan) A-u-H Qureshi	5	4
