= Dominic Thiem career statistics =

Austrian tennis player

Career finals
Discipline	Type	Won	Lost	Total	WR
Singles
Singles	Grand Slam	1	3	4	0.25
Singles	ATP Finals	0	2	2	0.00
Singles	ATP 1000	1	2	3	0.33
Singles	ATP 500	5	1	6	0.83
Singles	ATP 250	10	4	14	0.71
Singles	Olympics	–	–	–	–
Singles	Total	17	12	29	0.59
Doubles
Doubles	Grand Slam	–	–	–	–
Doubles	ATP Finals	–	–	–	–
Doubles	ATP 1000	0	1	1	0.00
Doubles	ATP 500	–	–	–	–
Doubles	ATP 250	0	2	2	0.00
Doubles	Olympics	–	–	–	–
Doubles	Total	0	3	3	0.00

This is a list of the main career statistics of Austrian professional tennis player Dominic Thiem. Up until his retirement in October 2024, Thiem won seventeen ATP singles titles, including at least one title on each surface (hard, clay and grass). He won the 2020 US Open title, and has reached three other Grand Slam finals at the 2018 French Open, 2019 French Open and 2020 Australian Open. He has also been in two Grand Slam semifinals at the 2016 French Open and 2017 French Open. He won the 2019 Indian Wells Masters and was a finalist at the 2017 and 2018 Madrid Open, semifinalist at the 2017 Italian Open, 2018 Paris Masters and 2019 Madrid Open and a quarterfinalist at the US Open in 2018 and at the French Open in 2020. Thiem achieved a career high singles ranking of world No. 3 on 2 March 2020.

== Career achievements ==
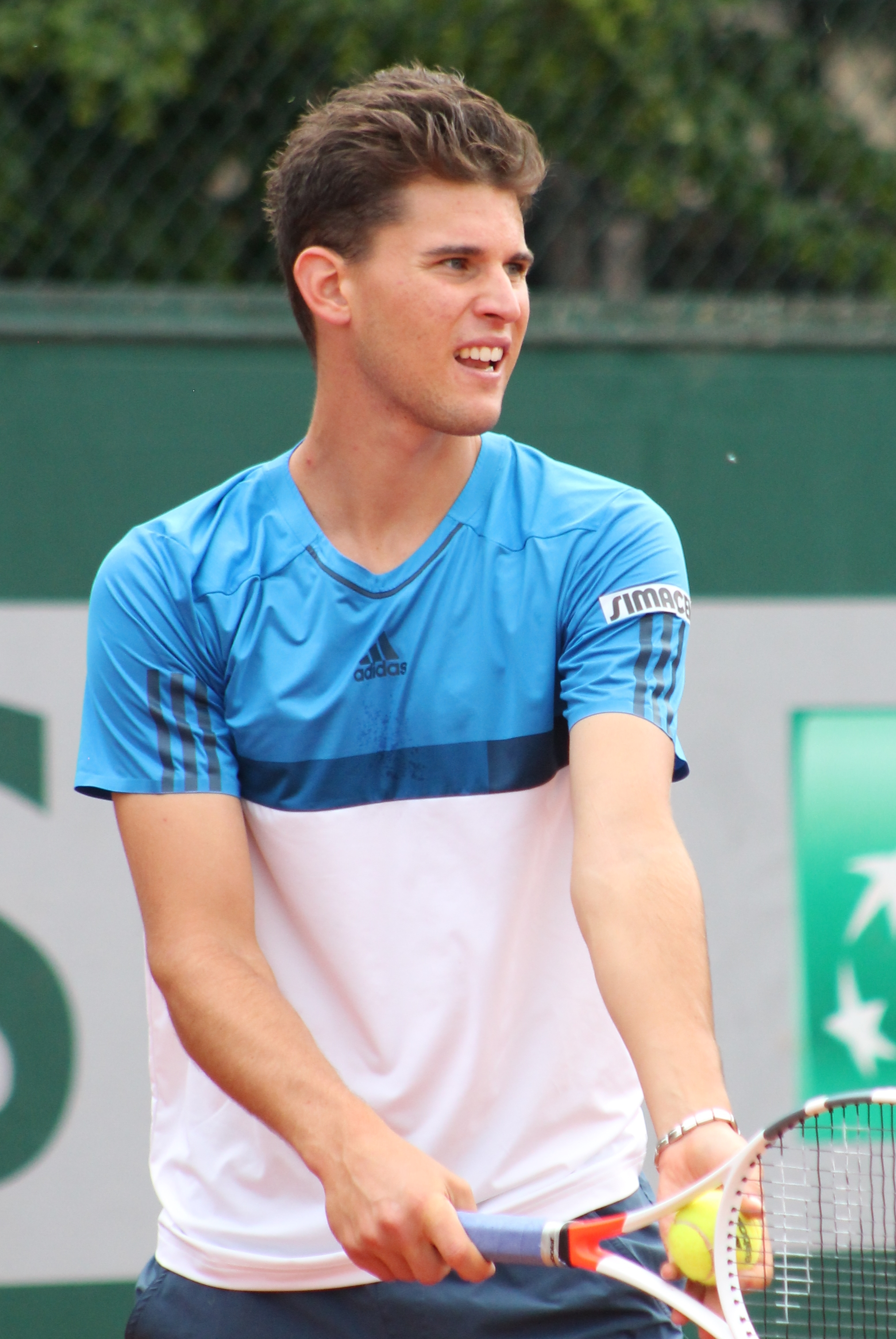
Thiem during the 2016 French Open, where he made the semifinals.

At the 2014 US Open, Thiem advanced to the fourth round of a Grand Slam for the first time but lost in straight sets to sixth seed Tomáš Berdych. The following year, he reached his first ATP Masters 1000 quarterfinal at the Miami Open, where he lost to eventual runner-up Andy Murray in three sets. Later that year, Thiem won the first three ATP singles titles of his career at the Open de Nice Côte d'Azur, Croatia Open Umag and Swiss Open with wins over Leonardo Mayer, João Sousa and David Goffin in the finals.

In February 2016, Thiem won his fourth ATP singles title at the Argentina Open, defeating top seed and defending champion Rafael Nadal en route after saving a match point in the third set. In the same month, he won his first ATP 500 title, and first title on hard court at the Abierto Mexicano Telcel, beating Bernard Tomic in the final. At the French Open, Thiem achieved his best Grand Slam result so far by advancing to the semifinals where he fell to the world No. 1 and eventual champion Novak Djokovic. He followed this up with his first title on grass at the MercedesCup, saving two match points against top seed Roger Federer en route. His strong performances throughout the year allowed him to qualify for the year-ending ATP World Tour Finals for the first time, where he scored his only win in the round-robin stage against Gaël Monfils. He finished with a career high year-end ranking of eighth.

Thiem began 2017 by reaching the fourth round of the Australian Open for the first time but lost to Goffin in a rematch of their third round match from the previous year. After falling at the quarterfinal stage in three of his past five tournaments, he won his first title of the year and second ATP 500 title at the Rio Open without dropping a set. He then went on to reach his first Masters 1000 final in the Madrid Masters before losing to Rafael Nadal in a tight straight set battle. He would reach the semifinals of the French Open for the second year running beating Novak Djokovic in the process before losing in straight sets to Nadal.

In 2020, Thiem won his first Grand Slam title at the 2020 US Open, defeating Alexander Zverev in a fifth-set tiebreak after being two sets down, becoming the first player to win a Grand Slam from this position since 2004 and the first at the US Open since Pancho Gonzales in 1949. 2020 was Thiem's most successful season, ending the year ranked 3rd and having reached the finals of two out of the three Grand Slams that took place.

== Performance timelines ==
Key
W	F	SF	QF	#R	RR	Q#	P#	DNQ	A	Z#	PO	G	S	B	NMS	NTI	P	NH

(W) winner; (F) finalist; (SF) semifinalist; (QF) quarterfinalist; (#R) rounds 4, 3, 2, 1; (RR) round-robin stage; (Q#) qualification round; (P#) preliminary round; (DNQ) did not qualify; (A) absent; (Z#) Davis/Fed Cup Zonal Group (with number indication) or (PO) play-off; (G) gold, (S) silver or (B) bronze Olympic/Paralympic medal; (NMS) not a Masters tournament; (NTI) not a Tier I tournament; (P) postponed; (NH) not held; (SR) strike rate (events won / competed); (W–L) win–loss record.
To avoid confusion and double counting, these charts are updated at the conclusion of a tournament or when the player's participation has ended.

=== Singles ===
Tournament	2011	2012	2013	2014	2015	2016	2017	2018	2019	2020	2021	2022	2023	2024	SR	W–L	Win %
Grand Slam tournaments
Australian Open	A	A	A	2R	1R	3R	4R	4R	2R(ret.)	F	4R	A	1R	1R	0 / 10	19–10	66%
French Open	A	A	A	2R	2R	SF	SF	F	F	QF	1R	1R	1R	Q2	0 / 10	28–10	74%
Wimbledon	A	A	A	1R	2R	2R	4R	1R(ret.)	1R	NH	A	A	1R	A	0 / 7	5–7	42%
US Open	A	A	A	4R	3R	4R(ret.)	4R	QF	1R	W	A	1R	2R(ret.)	1R	1 / 10	23–9	72%
Win–loss	0–0	0–0	0–0	5–4	4–4	11–4	14–4	13–4	7–4	17–2	3–2	0–2	1–4	0–2	1 / 37	75–36	68%
Year-end championship
ATP Finals	did not qualify					RR	RR	RR	F	F	did not qualify				0 / 5	9–10	47%
National representation
Summer Olympics	NH	A	not held			A	not held				A	not held		A	0 / 0	0–0	–
Davis Cup	A	A	A	Z1	Z1	Z1	Z1	PO	Z1	A	A	A	QR	G1	0 / 0	10–6	63%
ATP Masters 1000
Indian Wells Open	A	A	A	3R	1R	4R	QF	3R(ret.)	W	NH	A	A	1R	A	1 / 7	13–6	68%
Miami Open	A	A	A	2R	QF	4R	2R	A	2R	NH	A	A	1R	A	0 / 6	7–6	54%
Monte-Carlo Masters	A	A	A	1R	1R	3R	3R	QF	3R	NH	A	A	2R	Q1	0 / 7	7–7	50%
Madrid Open	A	A	A	3R	A	1R	F	F	SF	NH	SF	1R	2R	Q2	0 / 8	17–7	71%
Italian Open	A	A	A	A	3R	QF	SF	2R	2R	A	3R	1R	A	A	0 / 7	9–7	56%
Canadian Open	A	A	A	1R	1R	2R	2R	2R	QF	NH	A	A	A	A	0 / 6	2–6	25%
Cincinnati Open	A	A	A	1R	1R	QF	QF	A	A	2R	A	A	A	A	0 / 5	3–5	38%
Shanghai Masters	A	A	A	2R	2R	A	2R	2R	QF	NH			A	A	0 / 5	4–5	44%
Paris Masters	A	A	A	2R	2R	2R	3R	SF	3R	A	A	A	2R	A	0 / 7	8–7	53%
Win–loss	0–0	0–0	0–0	7–7	8–8	10–8	14–9	10–7	14–7	0–1	4–2	0–2	3–5	0–0	1 / 58	70–56	56%
Career statistics
	2011	2012	2013	2014	2015	2016	2017	2018	2019	2020	2021	2022	2023	2024	Career		
Tournaments	3	2	2	23	29	27	27	23	21	7	8	16	22	9	Career total: 219		
Titles	0	0	0	0	3	4	1	3	5	1	0	0	0	0	Career total: 17		
Finals	0	0	0	1	3	6	3	5	7	3	0	0	1	0	Career total: 29		
Hard win–loss	1–2	1–1	2–1	10–14	14–16	27–15	21–19	23–10	26–11	19–7	5–4	11–7	6–11	1–4	6 / 116	167–122	58%
Clay win–loss	0–1	0–1	2–1	12–7	20–8	25–7	24–5	30–8	23–7	6–2	4–4	7–9	13–11	1–4	10 / 84	167–75	69%
Grass win–loss	0–0	0–0	0–0	0–2	2–4	7–2	4–3	1–2	0–1	0–0	0–1	0–0	0–2	0–1	1 / 19	14–18	44%
Overall win–loss	1–3	1–2	4–2	22–23	36–28	58–24	50–27	54–20	49–19	25–9	9–9	18–16	19–24	2–9	17 / 219	348–215	62%
Win %	25%	33%	67%	49%	56%	71%	65%	73%	72%	74%	50%	53%	44%	18%	Career total: 62%		
Year-end ranking	638	309	139	39	20	8	5	8	4	3	15	102	98	524	$30,351,126		

=== Doubles ===
Tournament	2011	2012	2013	2014	2015	2016	2017	2018	2019	2020	2021	2022	2023	2024	SR	W–L	Win %
Grand Slam tournaments
Australian Open	A	A	A	A	1R	2R	A	A	A	A	A	A	A	A	0 / 2	1–2	33%
French Open	A	A	A	1R	1R	1R	A	A	A	A	A	A	A	A	0 / 3	0–3	0%
Wimbledon	A	A	A	2R	A	A	A	A	A	NH	A	A	A	A	0 / 1	1–1	50%
US Open	A	A	A	2R	1R	2R	A	A	A	A	A	A	A	A	0 / 3	2–3	40%
Win–loss	0–0	0–0	0–0	2–3	0–3	2–3	0–0	0–0	0–0	0–0	0–0	0–0	0–0	0–0	0 / 9	4–9	31%
National representation
Davis Cup	A	A	A	Z1	Z1	Z1	Z1	PO	QR	A	A	A	QR	G1	0 / 0	1–2	33%
ATP Masters 1000
Indian Wells Open	A	A	A	A	A	QF	1R	1R	1R	NH	A	A	1R	A	0 / 5	2–5	29%
Miami Open	A	A	A	A	1R	1R	1R	A	1R	NH	A	A	A	A	0 / 4	0–4	0%
Monte-Carlo Masters	A	A	A	A	A	1R	A	A	2R	NH	A	A	A	A	0 / 2	1–2	33%
Madrid Open	A	A	A	A	A	A	1R	1R	F	NH	A	A	A	A	0 / 3	3–3	50%
Italian Open	A	A	A	A	A	2R	A	2R	2R	A	A	A	A	A	0 / 3	3–3	50%
Canadian Open	A	A	A	A	1R	1R	2R	A	A	NH	A	A	A	A	0 / 3	1–3	25%
Cincinnati Open	A	A	A	A	1R	A	1R	A	A	A	A	A	A	A	0 / 2	0–2	0%
Shanghai Masters	A	A	A	A	2R	A	A	QF	A	NH			A	A	0 / 2	3–2	60%
Paris Masters	A	A	A	A	A	2R	A	A	A	A	A	A	A	A	0 / 1	1–1	50%
Win–loss	0–0	0–0	0–0	0–0	1–4	4–6	1–5	3–4	5–5	0–0	0–0	0–0	0–1	0–0	0 / 25	14–25	36%
Career statistics
	2011	2012	2013	2014	2015	2016	2017	2018	2019	2020	2021	2022	2023	2024	Career		
Tournaments	1	0	1	6	16	17	12	8	8	1	0	0	6	2	Career total: 78		
Titles	0	0	0	0	0	0	0	0	0	0	0	0	0	0	Career total: 0		
Finals	0	0	0	0	0	1	0	0	2	0	0	0	0	0	Career total: 3		
Overall win–loss	0–1	0–0	2–1	3–7	4–16	12–17	3–13	6–7	9–8	0–1	0–1	0–0	1–6	0–2	0 / 78	40–80	33%
Year-end ranking	–	579	498	257	255	94	269	178	78	112	230	–	886				

== Grand Slam finals ==
=== Singles: 4 (1 title, 3 runner-ups) ===
Result	Year	Tournament	Surface	Opponent	Score
Loss	2018	French Open	Clay	(Spain) Rafael Nadal	4–6, 3–6, 2–6
Loss	2019	French Open	Clay	(Spain) Rafael Nadal	3–6, 7–5, 1–6, 1–6
Loss	2020	Australian Open	Hard	(Serbia) Novak Djokovic	4–6, 6–4, 6–2, 3–6, 4–6
Win	2020	US Open	Hard	(Germany) Alexander Zverev	2–6, 4–6, 6–4, 6–3, 7–6^{(8–6)}

== Other significant finals ==
=== Year-end championships ===
==== Singles: 2 (2 runner-ups) ====
Result	Year	Tournament	Surface	Opponent	Score
Loss	2019	ATP Finals, United Kingdom	Hard (i)	(Greece) Stefanos Tsitsipas	7–6^{(8–6)}, 2–6, 6–7^{(4–7)}
Loss	2020	ATP Finals, United Kingdom	Hard (i)	(Russia) Daniil Medvedev	6–4, 6–7^{(2–7)}, 4–6

=== ATP Masters 1000 finals ===
==== Singles: 3 (1 title, 2 runner-ups) ====
Result	Year	Tournament	Surface	Opponent	Score
Loss	2017	Madrid Open	Clay	(Spain) Rafael Nadal	6–7^{(8–10)}, 4–6
Loss	2018	Madrid Open	Clay	(Germany) Alexander Zverev	4–6, 4–6
Win	2019	Indian Wells Open	Hard	(Switzerland) Roger Federer	3–6, 6–3, 7–5

==== Doubles: 1 (1 runner-up) ====
Result	Year	Tournament	Surface	Partner	Opponents	Score
Loss	2019	Madrid Open	Clay	(Argentina) Diego Schwartzman	(Netherlands) Jean-Julien Rojer (Romania) Horia Tecău	2–6, 3–6

== ATP career finals ==
=== Singles: 29 (17 titles, 12 runner-ups) ===
Legend Grand Slam tournaments (1–3) ATP Tour Finals (0–2) ATP Tour Masters 1000 (1–2) ATP Tour 500 Series (5–1) ATP Tour 250 Series (10–4)	Finals by surface Hard (6–4) Clay (10–8) Grass (1–0)	Finals by setting Outdoors (15–8) Indoors (2–4)

Result	W–L	Date	Tournament	Tier	Surface	Opponent	Score
Loss	0–1	Aug 2014	Austrian Open, Austria	250 Series	Clay	(Belgium) David Goffin	6–4, 1–6, 3–6
Win	1–1	May 2015	Open de Nice, France	250 Series	Clay	(Argentina) Leonardo Mayer	6–7^{(8–10)}, 7–5, 7–6^{(7–2)}
Win	2–1	Jul 2015	Croatia Open, Croatia	250 Series	Clay	(Portugal) João Sousa	6–4, 6–1
Win	3–1	Aug 2015	Swiss Open, Switzerland	250 Series	Clay	(Belgium) David Goffin	7–5, 6–2
Win	4–1	Feb 2016	Argentina Open, Argentina	250 Series	Clay	(Spain) Nicolás Almagro	7–6^{(7–2)}, 3–6, 7–6^{(7–4)}
Win	5–1	Feb 2016	Mexican Open, Mexico	500 Series	Hard	(Australia) Bernard Tomic	7–6^{(8–6)}, 4–6, 6–3
Loss	5–2	May 2016	Bavarian Championships, Germany	250 Series	Clay	(Germany) Philipp Kohlschreiber	6–7^{(7–9)}, 6–4, 6–7^{(4–7)}
Win	6–2	May 2016	Open de Nice, France (2)	250 Series	Clay	(Germany) Alexander Zverev	6–4, 3–6, 6–0
Win	7–2	Jun 2016	Stuttgart Open, Germany	250 Series	Grass	(Germany) Philipp Kohlschreiber	6–7^{(2–7)}, 6–4, 6–4
Loss	7–3	Sep 2016	Moselle Open, France	250 Series	Hard (i)	(France) Lucas Pouille	6–7^{(5–7)}, 2–6
Win	8–3	Feb 2017	Rio Open, Brazil	500 Series	Clay	(Spain) Pablo Carreño Busta	7–5, 6–4
Loss	8–4	Apr 2017	Barcelona Open, Spain	500 Series	Clay	(Spain) Rafael Nadal	4–6, 1–6
Loss	8–5	May 2017	Madrid Open, Spain	Masters 1000	Clay	(Spain) Rafael Nadal	6–7^{(8–10)}, 4–6
Win	9–5	Feb 2018	Argentina Open, Argentina (2)	250 Series	Clay	(Slovenia) Aljaž Bedene	6–2, 6–4
Loss	9–6	May 2018	Madrid Open, Spain	Masters 1000	Clay	(Germany) Alexander Zverev	4–6, 4–6
Win	10–6	May 2018	Lyon Open, France	250 Series	Clay	(France) Gilles Simon	3–6, 7–6^{(7–2)}, 6–1
Loss	10–7	Jun 2018	French Open, France	Grand Slam	Clay	(Spain) Rafael Nadal	4–6, 3–6, 2–6
Win	11–7	Sep 2018	St. Petersburg Open, Russia	250 Series	Hard (i)	(Slovakia) Martin Kližan	6–3, 6–1
Win	12–7	Mar 2019	Indian Wells Masters, United States	Masters 1000	Hard	(Switzerland) Roger Federer	3–6, 6–3, 7–5
Win	13–7	Apr 2019	Barcelona Open, Spain	500 Series	Clay	(Russia) Daniil Medvedev	6–4, 6–0
Loss	13–8	Jun 2019	French Open, France	Grand Slam	Clay	(Spain) Rafael Nadal	3–6, 7–5, 1–6, 1–6
Win	14–8	Aug 2019	Austrian Open, Austria	250 Series	Clay	(Spain) Albert Ramos Viñolas	7–6^{(7–0)}, 6–1
Win	15–8	Oct 2019	China Open, China	500 Series	Hard	(Greece) Stefanos Tsitsipas	3–6, 6–4, 6–1
Win	16–8	Oct 2019	Vienna Open, Austria	500 Series	Hard (i)	(Argentina) Diego Schwartzman	3–6, 6–4, 6–3
Loss	16–9	Nov 2019	ATP Finals, United Kingdom	Finals	Hard (i)	(Greece) Stefanos Tsitsipas	7–6^{(8–6)}, 2–6, 6–7^{(4–7)}
Loss	16–10	Jan 2020	Australian Open, Australia	Grand Slam	Hard	(Serbia) Novak Djokovic	4–6, 6–4, 6–2, 3–6, 4–6
Win	17–10	Sep 2020	US Open, United States	Grand Slam	Hard	(Germany) Alexander Zverev	2–6, 4–6, 6–4, 6–3, 7–6^{(8–6)}
Loss	17–11	Nov 2020	ATP Finals, United Kingdom	Finals	Hard (i)	(Russia) Daniil Medvedev	6–4, 6–7^{(2–7)}, 4–6
Loss	17–12	Aug 2023	Austrian Open, Austria	250 Series	Clay	(Argentina) Sebastián Báez	3–6, 1–6

=== Doubles: 3 (3 runner-ups) ===
Legend Grand Slam tournaments (0–0) ATP Tour Finals (0–0) ATP Tour Masters 1000 (0–1) ATP Tour 500 Series (0–0) ATP Tour 250 Series (0–2)	Finals by surface Hard (0–0) Clay (0–3) Grass (0–0)	Finals by setting Outdoors (0–3) Indoors (0–0)

Result	W–L	Date	Tournament	Tier	Surface	Partner	Opponents	Score
Loss	0–1	Jul 2016	Austrian Open, Austria	250 Series	Clay	(Austria) Dennis Novak	(Netherlands) Wesley Koolhof (Netherlands) Matwé Middelkoop	6–2, 3–6, [9–11]
Loss	0–2	Feb 2019	Argentina Open, Argentina	250 Series	Clay	(Argentina) Diego Schwartzman	(Argentina) Máximo González (Argentina) Horacio Zeballos	1–6, 1–6
Loss	0–3	May 2019	Madrid Open, Spain	Masters 1000	Clay	(Argentina) Diego Schwartzman	(Netherlands) Jean-Julien Rojer (Romania) Horia Tecău	2–6, 3–6

== ATP Challengers and ITF Futures finals ==
=== Singles: 14 (7 titles, 7 runner-ups) ===
Legend
ATP Challengers (2–2)
ITF Futures (5–5)

Result	W–L	Date	Tournament	Tier	Surface	Opponent	Score
Loss	0–1	Nov 2011	Turkey F31, Antalya	Futures	Clay	(Germany) Stefan Seifert	6–3, 5–7, 3–6
Win	1–1	May 2012	Czech Republic F1, Teplice	Futures	Clay	(Austria) Marc Rath	6–2, 6–4
Loss	1–2	Jul 2012	Czech Republic F4, Prostějov	Futures	Clay (i)	(Czech Republic) Jiří Veselý	4–6, 4–6
Win	2–2	Nov 2012	Morocco F9, Fes	Futures	Clay	(Italy) Alberto Brizzi	6–3, 6–1
Win	3–2	Dec 2012	Morocco F10, Oujda	Futures	Clay	(Italy) Riccardo Bellotti	7–6^{(7–4)}, 6–1
Loss	3–3	Mar 2013	Croatia F5, Rovinj	Futures	Clay	(Slovakia) Miloslav Mečíř	5–5, retired
Win	4–3	Mar 2013	Croatia F6, Vrsar	Futures	Clay	(Spain) Pere Riba	2–6, 6–3, 3–1, retired
Loss	4–4	May 2013	Czech Republic F1, Most	Futures	Clay	(Slovakia) Norbert Gomboš	6–4, 2–6, 2–6
Loss	4–5	Jul 2013	Italy F17, Modena	Futures	Clay	(Italy) Marco Cecchinato	3–6, 4–6
Win	5–5	Aug 2013	Italy F22, Este	Futures	Clay	(Slovakia) Norbert Gomboš	6–1, 6–4
Loss	5–6	Sep 2013	Como, Italy	Challenger	Clay	(Spain) Pablo Carreño Busta	2–6, 7–5, 0–6
Win	6–6	Sep 2013	Kenitra, Morocco	Challenger	Clay	(Russia) Teymuraz Gabashvili	7–6^{(7–4)}, 5–1, retired
Win	7–6	Nov 2013	Casablanca, Morocco	Challenger	Clay	(Italy) Potito Starace	6–2, 7–5
Loss	7–7	Sep 2022	Rennes, France	Challenger	Hard (i)	(France) Ugo Humbert	3–6, 0–6

== ITF Junior Circuit finals ==
=== Singles: (11 titles, 1 runner-up) ===
Legend
Category GA (1–1)
Category G1 (6–0)
Category G2 (2–0)
Category G3 (0–0)
Category G4 (1–0)
Category G5 (1–0)

Result	W–L	Date	Tournament	Tier	Surface	Opponent	Score
Win	1–0	Jul 2009	Preveza Cup, Greece	Category G5	Hard	(Greece) Anastasios Pavlis	2–1 ret.
Win	2–0	Oct 2009	Grawe Junior Cup, Croatia	Category G4	Clay	(Austria) Patrick Ofner	6–2, 6–3
Win	3–0	Jan 2010	Country Club Barranquilla Open, Colombia	Category G1	Clay	(Paraguay) Diego Galeano	7–6^{(7–1)}, 6–2
Win	4–0	Feb 2010	Inka Bowl, Peru	Category G2	Clay	(Japan) Taro Daniel	6–4, 6–2
Win	5–0	May 2010	Torneo Internazionale Mauro Sabatini, Italy	Category G1	Clay	(Russia) Victor Baluda	6–2, 6–4
Win	6–0	Nov 2010	Yucatán World Cup, Mexico	Category G1	Hard	(Austria) Dennis Novak	3–6, 6–2, 6–2
Win	7–0	Dec 2010	Eddie Herr International Junior Championships, USA	Category G1	Hard	(United Kingdom) Oliver Golding	6–2, 6–1
Loss	7–1	Jun 2011	French Open, France	Category GA	Clay	(United States) Bjorn Fratangelo	6–3, 3–6, 6–8
Win	8–1	Jun 2011	Gerry Weber Junior Open, Germany	Category G2	Grass	(United States) Dennis Novikov	7–5, 6–1
Win	9–1	Nov 2011	Yucatán Cup, Mexico (2)	Category G1	Hard	(United Kingdom) Kyle Edmund	6–2, 6–4
Win	10–1	Dec 2011	Eddie Herr International Junior Championships, USA (2)	Category G1	Clay	(Austria) Patrick Ofner	6–1, 6–0
Win	11–1	Dec 2011	Orange Bowl, USA	Category GA	Clay	(Austria) Patrick Ofner	6–1, 6–0

=== Doubles: (3 titles, 3 runner-ups) ===
Legend
Category GA (0–1)
Category G1 (1–0)
Category G2 (2–0)
Category G3 (0–0)
Category G4 (0–1)
Category G5 (0–1)

Result	W–L	Date	Tournament	Tier	Surface	Partner	Opponents	Score
Loss	0–1	Jul 2009	Preveza Cup, Greece	Category G5	Hard	(Serbia) Peđa Krstin	(Czech Republic) Jakub Hadrava (United Kingdom) Stefan Sterland-Markovic	2–6, 4–6
Loss	0–2	Oct 2009	Grawe Junior Cup, Croatia	Category G4	Clay	(Croatia) Mate Delić	(Slovenia) Nik Razboršek (Slovenia) Tilen Žitnik	0–6, 0–6
Win	1–2	Jun 2010	Gerry Weber Junior Open, Germany	Category G2	Grass	(Germany) Matthias Wunner	(United States) Mitchell Krueger (Philippines) Jeson Patrombon	6–3, 6–1
Win	2–2	Jun 2011	Gerry Weber Junior Open, Germany (2)	Category G2	Grass	(Germany) Julian Lenz	(Czech Republic) Adam Pavlásek (Croatia) Filip Veger	6–3, 6–4
Win	3–2	Sep 2011	Canadian Junior Open, Canada	Category G1	Hard	(United Kingdom) George Morgan	(Moldova) Maxim Dubarenco (Ukraine) Vladyslav Manafov	6–1, 6–4
Loss	3–3	Dec 2011	Orange Bowl, USA	Category GA	Clay	(Germany) Robin Kern	(United Kingdom) Liam Broady (United Kingdom) Joshua Ward-Hibbert	4–6, 3–6

== National participation ==
=== Davis Cup (11–8) ===
Group membership Finals / World Group (0–0) Qualifying round (0–2) WG Play-offs (2–0) Group I (8–6) WG I Play-offs (1–0)	Matches by surface Hard (5–5) Clay (6–3)	Matches by setting Outdoors (4–3) Indoors (7–5)	Matches by type Singles (10–6) Doubles (1–2)	Matches by venue Austria (6–3) Away (5–5)

Date	Venue	Surface	Group	Round	Opponent nation	Score	Match	Opponent player(s)	W/L	Rubber score
2014
Apr 2014	Bratislava	Hard (i)	G1	2R	Slovakia	1–4	Singles 1	Norbert Gomboš	Loss	4–6, 6–3, 3–6, 4–6
Apr 2014	Bratislava	Hard (i)	G1	2R	Slovakia	1–4	Doubles (w/ A Peya)	M Kližan / M Mertiňák	Loss	7–6^{(7–4)}, 6–3, 6–7^{(5–7)}, 4–6, 4–6
2015
Jul 2015	Kitzbühel	Clay	G1	2R	Netherlands	2–3	Singles 1	Thiemo de Bakker	Loss	3–6, 6–4, 7–6^{(7–5)}, 3–6, 4–6
Jul 2015	Kitzbühel	Clay	G1	2R	Netherlands	2–3	Singles 4	Robin Haase	Loss	4–6, 6–7^{(4–7)}, 3–6
2016
Mar 2016	Guimarães	Hard (i)	G1	1R	Portugal	4–1	Singles 2	Gastão Elias	Win	3–6, 7–5, 6–3, 1–6, 7–6^{(8–6)}
Mar 2016	Guimarães	Hard (i)	G1	1R	Portugal	4–1	Doubles (w/ A Peya)	G Elias / J Sousa	Win	6–7^{(6–8)}, 6–7^{(4–7)}, 6–1, 6–3, 6–4
Mar 2016	Guimarães	Hard (i)	G1	1R	Portugal	4–1	Singles 4	João Sousa	Win	6–2, 6–4, 6–2
2017
Sep 2017	Wels	Clay	G1	1R PO	Romania	4–1	Singles 2	Bogdan Borza	Win	6–2, 6–2, 6–4
Sep 2017	Wels	Clay	G1	1R PO	Romania	4–1	Doubles (w/ P Oswald)	N Frunză / H Tecău	Loss	6–7^{(1–7)}, 2–6, 7–6^{(7–5)}, 3–6
Sep 2017	Wels	Clay	G1	1R PO	Romania	4–1	Singles 4	Nicolae Frunză	Win	7–6^{(7–2)}, 7–6^{(7–3)}, 6–3
2018
Feb 2018	Sankt Pölten	Clay (i)	G1	1R	Belarus	5–0	Singles 2	Dzmitry Zhyrmont	Win	6–3, 6–3
Feb 2018	Sankt Pölten	Clay (i)	G1	1R	Belarus	5–0	Singles 4	Ilya Ivashka	Win	6–4, 7–6^{(7–5)}
Sep 2018	Graz	Clay	WG	PO	Australia	3–1	Singles 1	Jordan Thompson	Win	6–1, 6–3, 6–0
Sep 2018	Graz	Clay	WG	PO	Australia	3–1	Singles 4	Alex de Minaur	Win	6–4, 6–2, 3–6, 6–4
2019
Sep 2019	Espoo	Hard (i)	G1	1R	Finland	3–2	Singles 1	Patrik Niklas-Salminen	Win	6–3, 6–4
Sep 2019	Espoo	Hard (i)	G1	1R	Finland	3–2	Singles 4	Emil Ruusuvuori	Loss	3–6, 2–6
2023
Feb 2023	Rijeka	Hard (i)	Finals	QR	Croatia	1–3	Singles 2	Borna Gojo	Loss	3–6, 6–7^{(2–7)}
Feb 2023	Rijeka	Hard (i)	Finals	QR	Croatia	1–3	Singles 4	Borna Ćorić	Loss	6–7^{(3–7)}, 2–6
2024
Feb 2024	Limerick	Hard (i)	WG I	PO	Ireland	4–0	Singles 1	Michael Agwi	Win	7–6^{(8–6)}, 6–3

== Best Grand Slam results details ==
	Australian Open	
2020 Australian Open (5th seed)
Round	Opponent	Score
1R	(France) Adrian Mannarino	6–3, 7–5, 6–2
2R	(Australia) Alex Bolt (WC)	6–2, 5–7, 6–7^{(5–7)}, 6–1, 6–2
3R	(United States) Taylor Fritz (29)	6–2, 6–4, 6–7^{(5–7)}, 6–4
4R	(France) Gaël Monfils (10)	6–2, 6–4, 6–4
QF	(Spain) Rafael Nadal (1)	7–6^{(7–3)}, 7–6^{(7–4)}, 4–6, 7–6^{(8–6)}
SF	(Germany) Alexander Zverev (7)	3–6, 6–4, 7–6^{(7–3)}, 7–6^{(7–4)}
F	(Serbia) Novak Djokovic (2)	4–6, 6–4, 6–2, 3–6, 4–6

	French Open	
2018 French Open (7th seed)
Round	Opponent	Score
1R	(Belarus) Ilya Ivashka (Q)	6–2, 6–4, 6–1
2R	(Greece) Stefanos Tsitsipas	6–2, 2–6, 6–4, 6–4
3R	(Italy) Matteo Berrettini	6–3, 6–7^{(5–7)}, 6–3, 6–2
4R	(Japan) Kei Nishikori (19)	6–2, 6–0, 5–7, 6–4
QF	(Germany) Alexander Zverev (2)	6–4, 6–2, 6–1
SF	(Italy) Marco Cecchinato	7–5, 7–6^{(12–10)}, 6–1
F	(Spain) Rafael Nadal (1)	4–6, 3–6, 2–6

	French Open	
2019 French Open (4th seed)
Round	Opponent	Score
1R	(United States) Tommy Paul (WC)	6–4, 4–6, 7–6^{(7–5)}, 6–2
2R	(Kazakhstan) Alexander Bublik	6–3, 6–7^{(6–8)}, 6–3, 7–5
3R	(Uruguay) Pablo Cuevas	6–3, 4–6, 6–2, 7–5
4R	(France) Gaël Monfils (14)	6–4, 6–4, 6–2
QF	(Russia) Karen Khachanov (10)	6–2, 6–4, 6–2
SF	(Serbia) Novak Djokovic (1)	6–2, 3–6, 7–5, 5–7, 7–5
F	(Spain) Rafael Nadal (2)	3–6, 7–5, 1–6, 1–6

	Wimbledon Championships	
2017 Wimbledon (8th seed)
Round	Opponent	Score
1R	(Canada) Vasek Pospisil	6–4, 6–4, 6–3
2R	(France) Gilles Simon	5–7, 6–4, 6–2, 6–4
3R	(United States) Jared Donaldson	7–5, 6–4, 6–2
4R	(Czech Republic) Tomáš Berdych (11)	3–6, 7–6^{(7–1)}, 3–6, 6–3, 3–6

	US Open	
2020 US Open (2nd seed)
Round	Opponent	Score
1R	(Spain) Jaume Munar	7–6^{(8–6)}, 6–3, 0–0 Ret.
2R	(India) Sumit Nagal	6–3, 6–3, 6–2
3R	(Croatia) Marin Čilić (31)	6–2, 6–2, 3–6, 6–3
4R	(Canada) Félix Auger-Aliassime (15)	7–6^{(7–4)}, 6–1, 6–1
QF	(Australia) Alex de Minaur (21)	6–1, 6–2, 6–4
SF	(Russia) Daniil Medvedev (3)	6–2, 7–6^{(9–7)}, 7–6^{(7–5)}
W	(Germany) Alexander Zverev (5)	2–6, 4–6, 6–4, 6–3, 7–6^{(8–6)}

== Top-10 wins ==
- He has a 32–53 record against players who were, at the time the match was played, ranked in the top 10.

Season	2011	2012	2013	2014	2015	2016	2017	2018	2019	2020	2021	2022	2023	2024	Total
Wins	0	0	0	1	0	5	4	5	9	8	0	0	0	0	32

#	Player	Rk	Event	Surface	Rd	Score	Rk	Ref
2014
1.	(Switzerland) Stan Wawrinka	3	Madrid Open, Spain	Clay	2R	1–6, 6–2, 6–4	70	
2016
2.	(Spain) Rafael Nadal	5	Argentina Open, Argentina	Clay	SF	6–4, 4–6, 7–6^{(7–4)}	19	
3.	(Spain) David Ferrer	6	Rio Open, Brazil	Clay	QF	6–3, 6–2	19	
4.	(Switzerland) Roger Federer	2	Italian Open, Italy	Clay	3R	7–6^{(7–2)}, 6–4	15	
5.	(Switzerland) Roger Federer	3	Stuttgart Open, Germany	Grass	SF	3–6, 7–6^{(9–7)}, 6–4	7	
6.	(France) Gaël Monfils	6	ATP Finals, United Kingdom	Hard (i)	RR	6–3, 1–6, 6–4	9	
2017
7.	(United Kingdom) Andy Murray	1	Barcelona Open, Spain	Clay	SF	6–2, 3–6, 6–4	9	
8.	(Spain) Rafael Nadal	4	Italian Open, Italy	Clay	QF	6–4, 6–3	7	
9.	(Serbia) Novak Djokovic	2	French Open, France	Clay	QF	7–6^{(7–5)}, 6–3, 6–0	7	
10.	(Spain) Pablo Carreño Busta	10	ATP Finals, United Kingdom	Hard (i)	RR	6–3, 3–6, 6–4	4	
2018
11.	(Spain) Rafael Nadal	1	Madrid Open, Spain	Clay	QF	7–5, 6–3	7	
12.	(South Africa) Kevin Anderson	8	Madrid Open, Spain	Clay	SF	6–4, 6–2	7	
13.	(Germany) Alexander Zverev	3	French Open, France	Clay	QF	6–4, 6–2, 6–1	8	
14.	(South Africa) Kevin Anderson	5	US Open, United States	Hard	4R	7–5, 6–2, 7–6^{(7–2)}	9	
15.	(Japan) Kei Nishikori	9	ATP Finals, United Kingdom	Hard (i)	RR	6–1, 6–4	8	
2019
16.	(Switzerland) Roger Federer	4	Indian Wells Open, United States	Hard	F	3–6, 6–3, 7–5	8	
17.	(Spain) Rafael Nadal	2	Barcelona Open, Spain	Clay	SF	6–4, 6–4	5	
18.	(Switzerland) Roger Federer	3	Madrid Open, Spain	Clay	QF	3–6, 7–6^{(13–11)}, 6–4	5	
19.	(Serbia) Novak Djokovic	1	French Open, France	Clay	SF	6–2, 3–6, 7–5, 5–7, 7–5	4	
20.	(Russia) Karen Khachanov	9	China Open, China	Hard	SF	2–6, 7–6^{(7–5)}, 7–5	5	
21.	(Greece) Stefanos Tsitsipas	7	China Open, China	Hard	F	3–6, 6–4, 6–1	5	
22.	(Switzerland) Roger Federer	3	ATP Finals, United Kingdom	Hard (i)	RR	7–5, 7–5	5	
23.	(Serbia) Novak Djokovic	2	ATP Finals, United Kingdom	Hard (i)	RR	6–7^{(5–7)}, 6–3, 7–6^{(7–5)}	5	
24.	(Germany) Alexander Zverev	7	ATP Finals, United Kingdom	Hard (i)	SF	7–5, 6–3	5	
2020
25.	(France) Gaël Monfils	10	Australian Open, Australia	Hard	4R	6–2, 6–4, 6–4	5	
26.	(Spain) Rafael Nadal	1	Australian Open, Australia	Hard	QF	7–6^{(7–3)}, 7–6^{(7–4)}, 4–6, 7–6^{(8–6)}	5	
27.	(Germany) Alexander Zverev	7	Australian Open, Australia	Hard	SF	3–6, 6–4, 7–6^{(7–3)}, 7–6^{(7–4)}	5	
28.	(Russia) Daniil Medvedev	5	US Open, United States	Hard	SF	6–2, 7–6^{(9–7)}, 7–6^{(7–5)}	3	
29.	(Germany) Alexander Zverev	7	US Open, United States	Hard	F	2–6, 4–6, 6–4, 6–3, 7–6^{(8–6)}	3	
30.	(Greece) Stefanos Tsitsipas	6	ATP Finals, United Kingdom	Hard (i)	RR	7–6^{(7–5)}, 4–6, 6–3	3	
31.	(Spain) Rafael Nadal	2	ATP Finals, United Kingdom	Hard (i)	RR	7–6^{(9–7)}, 7–6^{(7–4)}	3	
32.	(Serbia) Novak Djokovic	1	ATP Finals, United Kingdom	Hard (i)	SF	7–5, 6–7^{(10–12)}, 7–6^{(7–5)}	3	

== Career Grand Slam tournament seedings ==
The tournaments won by Thiem are bolded.

Legend (slams won / times seeded) seeded No. 1 (0 / 0) seeded No. 2 (**1** / 1) seeded No. 3 (0 / 2) seeded No. 4–10 (0 / 16) Seeded outside the top 10 (0 / 4) wild card (0 / 2) qualifier, not seeded (0 / 11)	Longest / total: 0 / 36; 1 / 36; 1 / 36; 15 / 36; 4 / 36; 2 / 36; 6 / 36

Year	Australian Open	French Open	Wimbledon	US Open
2014	qualifier	not seeded	not seeded	not seeded
2015	not seeded	not seeded	32nd	20th
2016	19th	13th	8th	8th
2017	8th	6th	8th	6th
2018	5th	7th	7th	9th
2019	7th	4th	5th	4th
2020	5th	3rd	tournament cancelled*	**2nd**
2021	3rd	4th	did not play	did not play
2022	did not play	not seeded	did not play	wild card
2023	wild card	not seeded	not seeded	not seeded
2024	not seeded	did not qualify	did not play	wild card

* Due to the COVID-19 pandemic, the 2020 Wimbledon Championships of the tournament was cancelled.

== ATP Tour career earnings ==
Year	Earnings (US$)	ATP rank
2010	1,635	NA
2011	30,599	NA
2012	29,407	NA
2013	69,679	NA
2014	754,480	NA
2015	1,123,706	NA
2016	3,152,363	8
2017	4,463,264	5
2018	4,624,646	8
2019	8,000,223	4
2020	6,030,756	2
2021	698,641	70
2022	181,678	174
2023	774,972	89
2024	86,620	114
Career*	$30,144,482	12

*Statistics correct as of 29 January 2024.

== Exhibitions ==
=== Tournament finals ===
==== Singles ====
Result	Date	Tournament	Surface	Opponent	Score
Win	Jun 2020	Adria Tour, Serbia	Clay	(Serbia) Filip Krajinović	4–3^{(7–2)}, 2–4, 4–2
Win	Jun 2020	Generali Pro Series, Austria	Clay	(Austria) David Pichler	6–2, 6–0
Loss	Jul 2020	Thiem's Seven, Austria	Clay	(Russia) Andrey Rublev	2–6, 7–5, [8–10]
Win	Jul 2020	Bett1 Aces Berlin Exhibition, Germany	Grass	(Italy) Matteo Berrettini	6–7^{(4–7)}, 6–4, [10–8]
Win	Jul 2020	Bett1 Aces Berlin Exhibition, Germany	Hard	(Italy) Jannik Sinner	6–4, 6–2
Loss	Jan 2021	A Day at The Drive, Adelaide, Australia	Hard	(Spain) Rafael Nadal	5–7, 4–6
