= 2009 Baden Open – Singles =

Singles
- 2009 Baden Open

Final
- Champion: (Germany) Florian Mayer
- Runner-up: (Jamaica) Dustin Brown
- Score: 6–2, 6–4

Events
Singles	Doubles
← 2008 ·	Baden Open	· 2010 →

Teymuraz Gabashvili was the defending champion; however, he chose not to play this year.
Florian Mayer defeated Dustin Brown 6–2, 6–4 in the final.

== Seeds ==
1. (Germany) Michael Berrer (first round)
2. (Spain) Pere Riba (quarterfinals)
3. (United States) Amer Delic (second round)
4. (United States) Brendan Evans (second round)
5. (Kazakhstan) Yuri Schukin (first round)
6. (Serbia) Juan Pablo Brzezicki (second round)
7. (Spain) Miguel Ángel López Jaén (second round)
8. (Serbia) Boris Pašanski (second round)

== Draw ==
=== Key ===
- Q = Qualifier
- WC = Wild card
- LL = Lucky loser
- Alt = Alternate
- SE = Special exempt
- PR = Protected ranking
- ITF = ITF entry
- JE = Junior exempt
- w/o = Walkover
- r = Retired
- d = Defaulted
- SR = Special ranking

=== Final four ===
Semifinals
(Germany) Julian Reister	4	6	1
(Germany) Florian Mayer	6	2	6
Q	(Jamaica) Dustin Brown	7	6
(Germany) Dominik Meffert	6^{6}	3

Final
(Germany) Florian Mayer	6	6
Q	(Jamaica) Dustin Brown	2	4

=== Top half ===
First round
1	(Germany) M Berrer	4	6	6^{10}
(Germany) M Bachinger	6	4	7
Q	(Germany) P Gojowczyk	6	6
(Germany) J Pospíšil	4	2
(Germany) J Reister	4	7	6
(Germany) T Kamke	6	6^{3}	1
(Slovenia) L Gregorc	2	6^{3}
7	(Spain) MÁ López Jaén	6	7
4	(United States) B Evans	6	6
WC	(Austria) N Reissig	4	3
WC	(Lithuania) R Berankis	6	6
Q	(Russia) E Donskoy	4	4
LL	(Romania) G Moraru	7	7
(Ukraine) S Bubka	6^{3}	6^{7}
(Germany) F Mayer	6	6
5	(Kazakhstan) Y Schukin	1	1

Second round
(Germany) M Bachinger	5	6	7
Q	(Germany) P Gojowczyk	7	4	6^{4}
(Germany) J Reister	4	6	6
7	(Spain) MÁ López Jaén	6	1	3
4	(United States) B Evans	6^{3}	6	3
WC	(Lithuania) R Berankis	7	4	6
LL	(Romania) G Moraru	4	4
(Germany) F Mayer	6	6

Quarterfinals
(Germany) M Bachinger	5	5
(Germany) J Reister	7	7
WC	(Lithuania) R Berankis	2	5
(Germany) F Mayer	6	7

Semifinals
(Germany) J Reister	4	6	1
(Germany) F Mayer	6	2	6

=== Bottom half ===
First round
6	(Argentina) JP Brzezicki	3	6	6
(Austria) M Fischer	6	1	0
Q	(Jamaica) D Brown	7	6^{4}	6
(Germany) D Kindlmann	6^{7}	7	3
(Belgium) N Desein	7	7
Q	(Poland) A Chadaj	6^{4}	6^{5}
(Brazil) J Souza	3	5
3	(United States) A Delic	6	7
8	(Serbia) B Pašanski	7	6
(Switzerland) M Lammer	5	0
(Germany) D Meffert	6	3	6
(Australia) P Luczak	1	6	3
(Germany) A Flock	7	6
WC	(Germany) D Schulz	5	1
(Australia) J Sirianni	5	3
2	(Spain) P Riba	7	6

Second round
6	(Argentina) JP Brzezicki	4	6	3
Q	(Jamaica) D Brown	6	2	6
(Belgium) N Desein	6	7
3	(United States) A Delic	2	5
8	(Serbia) B Pašanski	3	6	6^{5}
(Germany) D Meffert	6	3	7
(Germany) A Flock	4	3
2	(Spain) P Riba	6	6

Quarterfinals
Q	(Jamaica) D Brown	2	7	6
(Belgium) N Desein	6	6^{7}	3
(Germany) D Meffert	6	2	6
2	(Spain) P Riba	2	6	4

Semifinals
Q	(Jamaica) D Brown	7	6
(Germany) D Meffert	6^{6}	3
