= 2009 Baden Open =

- Date: May 25 – May 31
- Edition: 11th
- Location: Karlsruhe, Germany

Champions

Singles
- (Germany) Florian Mayer

Doubles
- (Australia) Rameez Junaid / (Germany) Philipp Marx
← 2008 ·	Baden Open	· 2010 →

The 2009 Baden Open was a professional tennis tournament played on outdoor red clay courts. It was part of the 2009 ATP Challenger Tour. It took place in Karlsruhe, Germany between May 25–31, 2009.

== Singles entrants ==
=== Seeds ===
Nationality	Player	Ranking*	Seeding
GER	Michael Berrer	116	1
ESP	Pere Riba	151	2
USA	Amer Delić	156	3
USA	Brendan Evans	161	4
KAZ	Yuri Schukin	178	5
ARG	Juan Pablo Brzezicki	179	6
ESP	Miguel Ángel López Jaén	180	7
SRB	Boris Pašanski	191	8

- Rankings are as of May 18, 2009.

=== Other entrants ===
The following players received wildcards into the singles main draw:

- (Lithuania) Ričardas Berankis
- (Austria) Nicolas Reissig
- (Germany) Dominik Schulz

The following players received entry from the qualifying draw:

- (Jamaica) Dustin Brown
- (Poland) Adam Chadaj
- (Russia) Evgeny Donskoy
- (Germany) Peter Gojowczyk
- (Romania) Gabriel Moraru (as a Lucky loser)

== Champions ==
=== Men's singles ===
(Germany) Florian Mayer def. (Jamaica) Dustin Brown, 6–2, 6–4

=== Men's doubles ===
(Australia) Rameez Junaid / (Germany) Philipp Marx def. (Poland) Tomasz Bednarek / (Pakistan) Aisam-ul-Haq Qureshi, 7–5, 6–4
