= 2016 MercedesCup – Doubles =

Doubles
- 2016 MercedesCup

Final
- Champion: (New Zealand) Marcus Daniell (New Zealand) Artem Sitak
- Runner-up: (Austria) Oliver Marach (France) Fabrice Martin
- Score: 6–7^{(4–7)}, 6–4, [10–8]

Details
- Draw: 16
- Seeds: 4

Events
Singles	Doubles
- Stuttgart Open

Rohan Bopanna and Florin Mergea were the defending champions, but Bopanna chose to compete in s'Hertogenbosch instead. Mergea played alongside Horia Tecău, but lost in the semifinals to Marcus Daniell and Artem Sitak.

Daniell and Sitak went on to win the title, defeating Oliver Marach and Fabrice Martin in the final, 6–7^{(4–7)}, 6–4, [10–8].

== Seeds ==
1. (United States) Bob Bryan / (United States) Mike Bryan (semifinals)
2. (Romania) Florin Mergea / (Romania) Horia Tecău (semifinals)
3. (Australia) John Peers / (Brazil) Bruno Soares (quarterfinals)
4. (Poland) Łukasz Kubot / (Austria) Alexander Peya (first round)

== Draw ==
Key

- Q = Qualifier
- WC = Wild card
- LL = Lucky loser
- Alt = Alternate
- ITF = ITF entry
- PR = Protected ranking
- SR = Special ranking
- SE = Special exempt
- JE = Junior exempt
- JR = Junior Accelerator Programme entrant
- CO = College Accelerator Programme entrant
- NG = Next Gen Accelerator Program entrant
- w/o = Walkover
- r = Retired
- d = Defaulted

=== Draw ===
First round
1	(United States) B Bryan (United States) M Bryan	6	6
(Uzbekistan) D Istomin (Ukraine) I Marchenko	3	1
(Croatia) M Čilić (Croatia) A Šančić	4	6^{4}
(Australia) S Groth (Sweden) R Lindstedt	6	7^{7}
3	(Australia) J Peers (Brazil) B Soares	7^{7}	6^{6}	[10]
(Cyprus) M Baghdatis (Bulgaria) G Dimitrov	6^{3}	7^{8}	[4]
(Austria) O Marach (France) F Martin	6	7^{7}
(Russia) A Kuznetsov (France) G Simon	3	6^{2}
(New Zealand) M Daniell (New Zealand) A Sitak	4	6	[10]
(Germany) P Kohlschreiber (Austria) D Thiem	6	3	[4]
WC	(Germany) M Berrer (Germany) J-L Struff	6	6^{1}	[10]
4	(Poland) Ł Kubot (Austria) A Peya	4	7^{7}	[7]
PR	(Germany) F Mayer (Austria) P Oswald	7^{7}	6
WC	(Argentina) JM del Potro (United States) T Fritz	6^{5}	3
(Serbia) V Troicki (Russia) M Youzhny	6	6^{4}	[8]
2	(Romania) F Mergea (Romania) H Tecău	3	7^{7}	[10]

Quarterfinals
1	(United States) B Bryan (United States) M Bryan	6	7^{7}
(Australia) S Groth (Sweden) R Lindstedt	4	6^{3}
3	(Australia) J Peers (Brazil) B Soares	5	4
(Austria) O Marach (France) F Martin	7	6
(New Zealand) M Daniell (New Zealand) A Sitak	6	7
WC	(Germany) M Berrer (Germany) J-L Struff	2	5
PR	(Germany) F Mayer (Austria) P Oswald	3	4
2	(Romania) F Mergea (Romania) H Tecău	6	6

Semifinals
1	(United States) B Bryan (United States) M Bryan	6^{1}	6^{6}
(Austria) O Marach (France) F Martin	7^{7}	7^{8}
(New Zealand) M Daniell (New Zealand) A Sitak	6	7^{7}
2	(Romania) F Mergea (Romania) H Tecău	3	6^{4}

Final
(Austria) O Marach (France) F Martin	7^{7}	4	[8]
(New Zealand) M Daniell (New Zealand) A Sitak	6^{4}	6	[10]
