= 2009 SAT Bangkok Open =

- Date: March 16 – March 22
- Edition: 1st
- Location: Bangkok, Thailand

Champions

Singles
- (Germany) Florian Mayer

Doubles
- (United Kingdom) Joshua Goodall / (Australia) Joseph Sirianni
SAT Bangkok Open	· 2010 →

The 2009 SAT Bangkok Open was a professional tennis tournament played on indoor hard courts. It was part of the 2009 ATP Challenger Tour. It took place in Bangkok, Thailand between 16 and 22 March 2009.

== Singles entrants ==
=== Seeds ===
Nationality	Player	Ranking*	Seeding
GER	Andreas Beck	86	1
KOR	Lee Hyung-taik	110	2
JPN	Go Soeda	117	3
AUS	Chris Guccione	134	4
FRA	Mathieu Montcourt	136	5
RUS	Mikhail Elgin	138	6
GER	Daniel Brands	148	7
IND	Somdev Devvarman	150	8

- Rankings are as of March 9, 2009.

=== Other entrants ===
The following players received wildcards into the singles main draw:

- (Argentina) Guillermo Coria
- (Bulgaria) Grigor Dimitrov
- (Thailand) Peerakit Siributwong
- (Thailand) Kittipong Wachiramanowong

The following players received entry from the qualifying draw:

- (India) Rohan Bopanna
- (South Korea) Im Kyu-tae
- (Israel) Noam Okun
- (United States) Tim Smyczek

The following player received special exempt into the main draw:

- (Ukraine) Sergei Bubka
- (Japan) Takao Suzuki

== Champions ==
=== Men's singles ===
(Germany) Florian Mayer def. (Thailand) Danai Udomchoke, 7–5, 6–2

=== Men's doubles ===
(United Kingdom) Joshua Goodall / (Australia) Joseph Sirianni def. (Russia) Mikhail Elgin / (Russia) Alexander Kudryavtsev, 6–3, 6–1
