= 2009 SAT Bangkok Open – Singles =

Singles
- 2009 SAT Bangkok Open

Final
- Champion: (Germany) Florian Mayer
- Runner-up: (Thailand) Danai Udomchoke
- Score: 7–5, 6–2

Events
Singles	Doubles
- SAT Bangkok Open

Florian Mayer won in the final of first edition of this tournament. He defeated Danai Udomchoke 7–5, 6–2.

== Seeds ==
1. (Germany) Andreas Beck (quarterfinals)
2. (South Korea) Lee Hyung-taik (second round, retired)
3. (Japan) Go Soeda (quarterfinals)
4. (Australia) Chris Guccione (first round)
5. (France) Mathieu Montcourt (second round)
6. (Russia) Michail Elgin (first round)
7. (Germany) Daniel Brands (first round)
8. (India) Somdev Devvarman (first round)

== Draw ==
Key

- Q = Qualifier
- WC = Wild card
- LL = Lucky loser
- Alt = Alternate
- ITF = ITF entry
- PR = Protected ranking
- SR = Special ranking
- SE = Special exempt
- JE = Junior exempt
- JR = Junior Accelerator Programme entrant
- CO = College Accelerator Programme entrant
- NG = Next Gen Accelerator Program entrant
- w/o = Walkover
- r = Retired
- d = Defaulted

=== Final four ===
Semifinals
Q	(Israel) Noam Okun	6	2	3
(Thailand) Danai Udomchoke	3	6	6
Q	(South Korea) Im Kyu-tae	6^{4}	6^{2}
(Germany) Florian Mayer	7^{7}	7^{7}

Final
(Thailand) Danai Udomchoke	5	2
(Germany) Florian Mayer	7	6

=== Top half ===
First round
1	(Germany) A Beck	6	6
(Sweden) B Rehnquist	3	4
(France) É Roger-Vasselin	6	6
(India) P Amritraj	3	2
(United States) R Ram	3	6^{7}
Q	(India) R Bopanna	6	7^{9}
Q	(Israel) N Okun	7^{9}	6
6	(Russia) M Elgin	6^{7}	4
4	(Australia) C Guccione	7	4	2
(Thailand) D Udomchoke	5	6	6
WC	(Bulgaria) G Dimitrov	6	6
WC	(Thailand) Peerakit Siributwong	0	3
(United Kingdom) J Goodall	7^{8}	3	2
(Italy) P Lorenzi	6^{6}	6	6
(Russia) A Kudryavtsev	4	6	1
5	(France) M Montcourt	6	3	6

Second round
1	(Germany) A Beck	6	6
(France) É Roger-Vasselin	4	2
Q	(India) R Bopanna	6	3	3
Q	(Israel) N Okun	4	6	6
(Thailand) D Udomchoke	7^{8}	7
WC	(Bulgaria) G Dimitrov	6^{6}	5
(Italy) P Lorenzi	6	7
5	(France) M Montcourt	4	5

Quarterfinals
1	(Germany) A Beck	4	2
Q	(Israel) N Okun	6	6
(Thailand) D Udomchoke	6	6
(Italy) P Lorenzi	2	4

Semifinals
Q	(Israel) N Okun	6	2	3
(Thailand) D Udomchoke	3	6	6

=== Bottom half ===
First round
8	(India) S Devvarman	3	6	4
(Austria) M Slanar	6	4	6
SE	(Japan) T Suzuki	4	6	0
Q	(South Korea) K-t Im	6	4	6
WC	(Argentina) G Coria	3	2
(Israel) H Levy	6	6
SE	(Ukraine) S Bubka	1	7	2
3	(Japan) G Soeda	6	5	6
7	(Germany) D Brands	1	3
(Germany) F Mayer	6	6
WC	(Thailand) K Wachiramanowong	6	6
(Australia) B Klein	4	3
(Germany) D Kindlmann	2	3
(Turkey) M İlhan	6	6
Q	(United States) T Smyczek	1	4
2	(South Korea) H-t Lee	6	6

Second round
(Austria) M Slanar	3	r
Q	(South Korea) K-t Im	6
(Israel) H Levy	1	1	r
3	(Japan) G Soeda	6	4
(Germany) F Mayer	7^{9}	6
WC	(Thailand) K Wachiramanowong	6^{7}	4
(Turkey) M İlhan	6	4
2	(South Korea) H-t Lee	2	1	r

Quarterfinals
Q	(South Korea) K-t Im	6	6
3	(Japan) G Soeda	4	4
(Germany) F Mayer	6	2	6
(Turkey) M İlhan	4	6	1

Semifinals
Q	(South Korea) K-t Im	6^{4}	6^{2}
(Germany) F Mayer	7^{7}	7^{7}
