= 2013 Gerry Weber Open – Singles =

Singles
- 2013 Gerry Weber Open

Final
- Champion: (Switzerland) Roger Federer
- Runner-up: (Russia) Mikhail Youzhny
- Score: 6–7^{(5–7)}, 6–3, 6–4

Details
- Draw: 28
- Seeds: 8

Events
Singles	Doubles
- Gerry Weber Open

Tommy Haas was the defending champion but was knocked out by top seed Roger Federer in the semifinals. Federer won 6–7^{(5–7)}, 6–3, 6–4 against Mikhail Youzhny to claim a record sixth title and his first since 2008.

== Seeds ==
The top four seeds received a bye into the second round.

1. (Switzerland) Roger Federer (champion)
2. (France) Richard Gasquet (semifinals)
3. (Germany) Tommy Haas (semifinals)
4. (Japan) Kei Nishikori (second round)
5. (Canada) Milos Raonic (first round)
6. (Germany) Philipp Kohlschreiber (quarterfinals)
7. (Poland) Jerzy Janowicz (first round)
8. (Germany) Florian Mayer (quarterfinals)

== Draw ==
Key

- Q = Qualifier
- WC = Wild card
- LL = Lucky loser
- Alt = Alternate
- ITF = ITF entry
- PR = Protected ranking
- SR = Special ranking
- SE = Special exempt
- JE = Junior exempt
- JR = Junior Accelerator Programme entrant
- CO = College Accelerator Programme entrant
- NG = Next Gen Accelerator Program entrant
- w/o = Walkover
- r = Retired
- d = Defaulted

=== Finals ===
Semifinals
1	(Switzerland) Roger Federer	3	6	6
3	(Germany) Tommy Haas	6	3	4
(Russia) Mikhail Youzhny	6	6
2	(France) Richard Gasquet	3	2

Final
1	(Switzerland) Roger Federer	6^{5}	6	6
(Russia) Mikhail Youzhny	7^{7}	3	4

=== Top half ===
First round
WC	(Germany) C-M Stebe	6	6
Q	(Chinese Taipei) J Wang	2	4
WC	(Germany) M Zverev	1	6	7
(Belgium) D Goffin	6	4	5
LL	(Bosnia and Herzegovina) M Bašić	7^{7}	3	7^{7}
7	(Poland) J Janowicz	6^{5}	6	6^{5}
(Cyprus) M Baghdatis	4	6	3
(Latvia) E Gulbis	6	3	6
Q	(Czech Republic) J Hernych	6	6
(Germany) D Brands	4	2
(France) G Monfils	6	6
5	(Canada) M Raonic	4	2

Second round
1	(Switzerland) R Federer	6	6
WC	(Germany) C-M Stebe	3	3
WC	(Germany) M Zverev	7^{7}	6
LL	(Bosnia and Herzegovina) M Bašić	6^{5}	3
3	(Germany) T Haas	7^{7}	6
(Latvia) E Gulbis	6^{5}	4
Q	(Czech Republic) J Hernych	2	3
(France) G Monfils	6	6

Quarterfinals
1	(Switzerland) R Federer	6	6
WC	(Germany) M Zverev	0	0
3	(Germany) T Haas	6^{4}	6	6
(France) G Monfils	7^{7}	3	3

Semifinals
1	(Switzerland) R Federer	3	6	6
3	(Germany) T Haas	6	3	4

=== Bottom half ===
First round
6	(Germany) P Kohlschreiber	6	6
(Argentina) C Berlocq	3	1
(Germany) T Kamke	6	6
(Poland) Ł Kubot	4	0
(Russia) M Youzhny	6	6
(Spain) D Gimeno Traver	1	2
8	(Germany) F Mayer	6	6
Q	(Austria) M Fischer	2	2
WC	(Germany) J-L Struff	6^{4}	4
(Argentina) L Mayer	7^{7}	6
(Austria) J Melzer	7^{7}	3	6
Q	(Italy) R Ghedin	6^{5}	6	4

Second round
6	(Germany) P Kohlschreiber	6	6
(Germany) T Kamke	4	3
(Russia) M Youzhny	6	6^{4}	6
4	(Japan) K Nishikori	1	7^{7}	3
8	(Germany) F Mayer	6	6
(Argentina) L Mayer	2	3
(Austria) J Melzer	3	1
2	(France) R Gasquet	6	6

Quarterfinals
6	(Germany) P Kohlschreiber	3	2
(Russia) M Youzhny	6	6
8	(Germany) F Mayer	3	6^{4}
2	(France) R Gasquet	6	7^{7}

Semifinals
(Russia) M Youzhny	6	6
2	(France) R Gasquet	3	2

== Qualifying ==
=== Seeds ===
The top three seeds received byes into the second round.

1. (Chinese Taipei) Jimmy Wang (qualified)
2. (Switzerland) Marco Chiudinelli (second round)
3. (United States) Alex Kuznetsov (second round)
4. (Russia) Konstantin Kravchuk (second round)
5. (Croatia) Nikola Mektić (second round)
6. (Bosnia and Herzegovina) Mirza Bašić (qualifying competition)
7. (France) Pierre-Hugues Herbert (second round)
8. (Ukraine) Denys Molchanov (qualifying competition)

=== Qualifiers ===
1. (Chinese Taipei) Jimmy Wang
2. (Czech Republic) Jan Hernych
3. (Italy) Riccardo Ghedin
4. (Austria) Martin Fischer

=== Lucky losers ===
1. (Bosnia and Herzegovina) Mirza Bašić

=== Qualifying draw ===
==== First qualifier ====
First round
(Austria) Dennis Novak	7	6
(Netherlands) Wesley Koolhof	5	3
WC	(Germany) Maximilian Marterer	7^{7}	6
(Australia) Bradley Mousley	6^{4}	4
(Germany) Andre Begemann	2	3
6	(Bosnia and Herzegovina) Mirza Bašić	6	6

Second round
1	(Chinese Taipei) Jimmy Wang	6	3	6
(Austria) Dennis Novak	1	6	3
WC	(Germany) Maximilian Marterer	6^{4}	3
6	(Bosnia and Herzegovina) Mirza Bašić	7^{7}	6

Qualifying competition
1	(Chinese Taipei) Jimmy Wang	6	6
6	(Bosnia and Herzegovina) Mirza Bašić	2	2

==== Second qualifier ====
First round
(Australia) Jay Andrijic	6^{2}	5
(Czech Republic) Jan Hernych	7^{7}	7
(Germany) Stefan Seifert	5	1
(Australia) Greg Jones	7	6
(Italy) Damiano di Ienno	2	3
5	(Croatia) Nikola Mektić	6	6

Second round
2	(Switzerland) Marco Chiudinelli	1	5
(Czech Republic) Jan Hernych	6	7
(Australia) Greg Jones	6	7^{7}
5	(Croatia) Nikola Mektić	1	6^{5}

Qualifying competition
(Czech Republic) Jan Hernych	6	6
(Australia) Greg Jones	4	2

==== Third qualifier ====
First round
(Canada) Érik Chvojka	6^{3}	0
(Italy) Riccardo Ghedin	7^{7}	6
(United States) Greg Ouellette	6	6
(Germany) Lennart Zynga	1	3
(Germany) Robin Kern	0	4
8	(Ukraine) Denys Molchanov	6	6

Second round
3	(United States) Alex Kuznetsov	3	4
(Italy) Riccardo Ghedin	6	6
(United States) Greg Ouellette	6^{1}	4
8	(Ukraine) Denys Molchanov	7^{7}	6

Qualifying competition
(Italy) Riccardo Ghedin	6	6
8	(Ukraine) Denys Molchanov	4	4

==== Fourth qualifier ====
First round
4	(Russia) Konstantin Kravchuk	6	6^{5}	6
(United States) Scott Lipsky	2	7^{7}	3
(Austria) Martin Fischer	6	7^{7}
(Mexico) Santiago González	1	6^{2}
(Bulgaria) Alexandar Lazov	2	7	7^{7}
(Australia) Omar Jasika	6	5	6^{2}
(Australia) Harry Bourchier	4	0
7	(France) Pierre-Hugues Herbert	6	6

Second round
4	(Russia) Konstantin Kravchuk	1	3
(Austria) Martin Fischer	6	6
(Bulgaria) Alexandar Lazov	3	6	6
7	(France) Pierre-Hugues Herbert	6	4	2

Qualifying competition
(Austria) Martin Fischer	6	6
(Bulgaria) Alexandar Lazov	4	1
