= 2016 MercedesCup =

- Date: 6–13 June
- Edition: 39th
- Category: ATP World Tour 250 series
- Draw: 28S / 16D
- Prize money: €606,520
- Surface: Grass
- Location: Stuttgart, Germany
- Venue: Tennis Club Weissenhof

Champions

Singles
- (Austria) Dominic Thiem

Doubles
- (New Zealand) Marcus Daniell / (New Zealand) Artem Sitak
← 2015 ·	MercedesCup	· 2017 →

The 2016 MercedesCup was a men's tennis tournament played on grass courts. It was the 39th edition of the MercedesCup, and part of the ATP World Tour 250 series of the 2016 ATP World Tour. It was held at the Tennis Club Weissenhof in Stuttgart, Germany, from 6 June until 13 June 2016. Third-seeded Dominic Thiem won the singles title.

== Finals ==
=== Singles ===
- (Austria) Dominic Thiem defeated (Germany) Philipp Kohlschreiber, 6–7^{(2–7)}, 6–4, 6–4

=== Doubles ===
- (New Zealand) Marcus Daniell / (New Zealand) Artem Sitak defeated (Austria) Oliver Marach / (France) Fabrice Martin, 6–7^{(4–7)}, 6–4, [10–8]

== Singles main-draw entrants ==
=== Seeds ===
Country	Player	Rank^{1}	Seed
SUI	Roger Federer	3	1
CRO	Marin Čilić	10	2
AUT	Dominic Thiem	15	3
FRA	Gilles Simon	18	4
ESP	Feliciano López	23	5
SRB	Viktor Troicki	24	6
GER	Philipp Kohlschreiber	26	7
FRA	Lucas Pouille	31	8

- ^{1} Rankings are as of May 23, 2016

=== Other entrants ===
The following players received wildcards into the singles main draw:

- (Germany) Michael Berrer
- (Germany) Jan Choinski
- (Argentina) Juan Martín del Potro

The following players received entry from the qualifying draw:

- (France) Fabrice Martin
- (Germany) Florian Mayer
- (Ukraine) Sergiy Stakhovsky
- (Czech Republic) Radek Štěpánek

=== Withdrawals ===
Before the tournament

- (Russia) Evgeny Donskoy →replaced by (Russia) Mikhail Youzhny
- (France) Benoît Paire →replaced by (Australia) Sam Groth

== Doubles main-draw entrants ==
=== Seeds ===
Country	Player	Country	Player	Rank^{1}	Seed
USA	Bob Bryan	USA	Mike Bryan	15	1
ROU	Florin Mergea	ROU	Horia Tecău	17	2
AUS	John Peers	BRA	Bruno Soares	22	3
POL	Łukasz Kubot	AUT	Alexander Peya	44	4

- Rankings are as of May 23, 2016

=== Other entrants ===
The following pairs received wildcards into the doubles main draw:

- (Germany) Michael Berrer / (Germany) Jan-Lennard Struff
- (Argentina) Juan Martín del Potro / (United States) Taylor Fritz
