= 2009 SAT Bangkok Open – Doubles =

Doubles
- 2009 SAT Bangkok Open

Final
- Champions: (United Kingdom) Josh Goodall (Australia) Joseph Sirianni
- Runners-up: (Russia) Mikhail Elgin (Russia) Alexander Kudryavtsev
- Score: 6–3, 6–1

Events
Singles	Doubles
SAT Bangkok Open	· 2010 →

This was the first edition of the tournament.

Josh Goodall and Joseph Sirianni won the title after defeating Mikhail Elgin and Alexander Kudryavtsev 6–3, 6–1 in the final.

== Seeds ==
1. (India) Rohan Bopanna / (Pakistan) Aisam-ul-Haq Qureshi (semifinals)
2. (India) Prakash Amritraj / (United States) Rajeev Ram (quarterfinals)
3. (Russia) Mikhail Elgin / (Russia) Alexander Kudryavtsev (final)
4. (Thailand) Sanchai Ratiwatana / (Thailand) Sonchat Ratiwatana (first round)

== Draw ==
=== Key ===
- Q = Qualifier
- WC = Wild card
- LL = Lucky loser
- Alt = Alternate
- SE = Special exempt
- PR = Protected ranking
- ITF = ITF entry
- JE = Junior exempt
- w/o = Walkover
- r = Retired
- d = Defaulted
- SR = Special ranking

First round
1	(India) R Bopanna (Pakistan) A-u-H Qureshi	6	6
(United Kingdom) B Klein (Thailand) D Udomchoke	3	4
WC	(United Kingdom) Faris Akhazzan (Thailand) P Siriluehaiwattana	3	5
(Australia) C Guccione (Brazil) M Torres	6	7
3	(Russia) M Elgin (Russia) A Kudryavtsev	6	3	[13]
(Germany) A Beck (Italy) P Lorenzi	4	6	[11]
(Germany) D Brands (Germany) D Kindlmann	6	6
WC	(Bulgaria) G Dimitrov (Thailand) K Wachiramanowong	0	4
(Austria) M Slanar (Japan) G Soeda	2	2
(France) M Montcourt (France) É Roger-Vasselin	6	6
(United Kingdom) J Goodall (Australia) J Sirianni	6	6
4	(Thailand) Sa Ratiwatana (Thailand) So Ratiwatana	4	3
(Israel) H Levy (Israel) N Okun	6	3	[10]
(Ukraine) S Bubka (Ukraine) D Molchanov	3	6	[6]
WC	(Thailand) Kirati Siributwong (Thailand) Peerakit Siributwong	4	1
2	(India) P Amritraj (United States) R Ram	6	6

Quarterfinals
1	(India) R Bopanna (Pakistan) A-u-H Qureshi	4	6	[10]
(Australia) C Guccione (Brazil) M Torres	6	3	[4]
3	(Russia) M Elgin (Russia) A Kudryavtsev	4	6	[10]
(Germany) D Brands (Germany) D Kindlmann	6	4	[6]
(France) M Montcourt (France) É Roger-Vasselin	2	6	[7]
(United Kingdom) J Goodall (Australia) J Sirianni	6	3	[10]
(Israel) H Levy (Israel) N Okun	6	6
2	(India) P Amritraj (United States) R Ram	2	4

Semifinals
1	(India) R Bopanna (Pakistan) A-u-H Qureshi	6^{4}	6^{5}
3	(Russia) M Elgin (Russia) A Kudryavtsev	7^{7}	7^{7}
(United Kingdom) J Goodall (Australia) J Sirianni	3	6	[10]
(Israel) H Levy (Israel) N Okun	6	3	[8]

Final
3	(Russia) M Elgin (Russia) A Kudryavtsev	3	1
(United Kingdom) J Goodall (Australia) J Sirianni	6	6
