= 2016 Gerry Weber Open – Singles =

Singles
- 2016 Gerry Weber Open

Final
- Champion: (Germany) Florian Mayer
- Runner-up: (Germany) Alexander Zverev
- Score: 6–2, 5–7, 6–3

Details
- Draw: 32 (4 Q / 3 WC )
- Seeds: 8

Events
Singles	Doubles
- Gerry Weber Open

Roger Federer was the three-time defending champion, but lost in the semifinals to Alexander Zverev.

Florian Mayer won the title, defeating Zverev in the final, 6–2, 5–7, 6–3.

== Seeds ==
1. (Switzerland) Roger Federer (semifinals)
2. (Japan) Kei Nishikori (second round, withdrew)
3. (Austria) Dominic Thiem (semifinals)
4. (Czech Republic) Tomáš Berdych (first round)
5. (Belgium) David Goffin (quarterfinals)
6. (Spain) David Ferrer (first round)
7. (Serbia) Viktor Troicki (first round)
8. (Germany) Philipp Kohlschreiber (quarterfinals, withdrew)

== Draw ==
Key

- Q = Qualifier
- WC = Wild card
- LL = Lucky loser
- Alt = Alternate
- ITF = ITF entry
- PR = Protected ranking
- SR = Special ranking
- SE = Special exempt
- JE = Junior exempt
- JR = Junior Accelerator Programme entrant
- CO = College Accelerator Programme entrant
- NG = Next Gen Accelerator Program entrant
- w/o = Walkover
- r = Retired
- d = Defaulted

=== Finals ===
Semifinals
1	(Switzerland) Roger Federer	6^{4}	7	3
(Germany) Alexander Zverev	7^{7}	5	6
3	(Austria) Dominic Thiem	3	4
PR	(Germany) Florian Mayer	6	6

Final
(Germany) Alexander Zverev	2	7	3
PR	(Germany) Florian Mayer	6	5	6

=== Top half ===
First round
1	(Switzerland) R Federer	6	7^{7}
WC	(Germany) J-L Struff	4	6^{3}
(Lithuania) R Berankis	5	4
(Tunisia) M Jaziri	7	6
(United States) D Kudla	5	6	3
Q	(Ukraine) S Stakhovsky	7	4	6
(Croatia) B Ćorić	6^{5}	7^{7}	4
5	(Belgium) D Goffin	7^{7}	6^{3}	6
4	(Czech Republic) T Berdych	6^{3}	6^{4}
(Cyprus) M Baghdatis	7^{7}	7^{7}
WC	(Germany) D Brown	6	7
(Spain) A Ramos-Viñolas	3	5
Q	(Latvia) E Gulbis	5	3
Q	(Germany) B Becker	7	6
(Germany) A Zverev	6	6
7	(Serbia) V Troicki	4	4

Second round
1	(Switzerland) R Federer	6	7
(Tunisia) M Jaziri	3	5
Q	(Ukraine) S Stakhovsky	6	5	0^{r}
5	(Belgium) D Goffin	4	7	2
(Cyprus) M Baghdatis	7	7^{10}
WC	(Germany) D Brown	5	6^{8}
Q	(Germany) B Becker	5	0^{r}
(Germany) A Zverev	7	3

Quarterfinals
1	(Switzerland) R Federer	6	7^{12}
5	(Belgium) D Goffin	1	6^{10}
(Cyprus) M Baghdatis	6^{9}	3
(Germany) A Zverev	7^{11}	6

Semifinals
1	(Switzerland) R Federer	6^{4}	7	3
(Germany) A Zverev	7^{7}	5	6

=== Bottom half ===
First round
8	(Germany) P Kohlschreiber	6	7^{7}
(Spain) M Granollers	2	6^{4}
(Croatia) I Karlović	7^{8}	6
(Russia) A Kuznetsov	6^{6}	3
(Italy) P Lorenzi	1	4
(Russia) T Gabashvili	6	6
(Portugal) J Sousa	5	4
3	(Austria) D Thiem	7	6
6	(Spain) D Ferrer	3	4
(Italy) A Seppi	6	6
Q	(Japan) Y Sugita	7^{7}	2	6
WC	(United States) T Fritz	6^{4}	6	3
PR	(United States) B Baker	5	6^{3}
PR	(Germany) F Mayer	7	7^{7}
(France) L Pouille	7^{7}	1	4
2	(Japan) K Nishikori	6^{5}	6	6

Second round
8	(Germany) P Kohlschreiber	6^{7}	6	7
(Croatia) I Karlović	7^{9}	4	5
(Russia) T Gabashvili	4	1
3	(Austria) D Thiem	6	6
(Italy) A Seppi	6	6
Q	(Japan) Y Sugita	3	0
PR	(Germany) F Mayer	w/o
2	(Japan) K Nishikori

Quarterfinals
8	(Germany) P Kohlschreiber
3	(Austria) D Thiem	w/o
(Italy) A Seppi	6^{4}	3
PR	(Germany) F Mayer	7^{7}	6

Semifinals
3	(Austria) D Thiem	3	4
PR	(Germany) F Mayer	6	6

== Qualifying ==
=== Seeds ===
1. (Latvia) Ernests Gulbis (qualified)
2. (Uzbekistan) Denis Istomin (first round)
3. (Czech Republic) Lukáš Rosol (first round)
4. (United States) Rajeev Ram (qualifying competition)
5. (Ukraine) Illya Marchenko (first round)
6. (Netherlands) Robin Haase (qualifying competition)
7. (Ukraine) Sergiy Stakhovsky (qualified)
8. (Georgia (country)) Nikoloz Basilashvili (first round)

=== Qualifiers ===
1. (Latvia) Ernests Gulbis
2. (Germany) Benjamin Becker
3. (Japan) Yūichi Sugita
4. (Ukraine) Sergiy Stakhovsky

=== Qualifying draw ===
==== First qualifier ====
First round
1	(Latvia) Ernests Gulbis	6	6
(Germany) Michael Berrer	4	4
WC	(Germany) Peter Gojowczyk	6	6
5	(Ukraine) Illya Marchenko	4	3

Qualifying competition
1	(Latvia) Ernests Gulbis	6	1	6
WC	(Germany) Peter Gojowczyk	3	6	3

==== Second qualifier ====
First round
2	(Uzbekistan) Denis Istomin	4	6	3
(Germany) Benjamin Becker	6	3	6
WC	(Germany) Johannes Härteis	4	2
6	(Netherlands) Robin Haase	6	6

Qualifying competition
(Germany) Benjamin Becker	6	6
6	(Netherlands) Robin Haase	3	3

==== Third qualifier ====
First round
3	(Czech Republic) Lukáš Rosol	6^{1}	3
(Japan) Tatsuma Ito	7^{7}	6
(Japan) Yūichi Sugita	6	6
8	(Georgia (country)) Nikoloz Basilashvili	3	1

Qualifying competition
(Japan) Tatsuma Ito	2	4
(Japan) Yūichi Sugita	6	6

==== Fourth qualifier ====
First round
4	(United States) Rajeev Ram	7^{9}	7^{7}
(Russia) Andrey Rublev	6^{7}	6^{5}
(Japan) Yoshihito Nishioka	3	1
7	(Ukraine) Sergiy Stakhovsky	6	6

Qualifying competition
4	(United States) Rajeev Ram	6^{3}	6	2
7	(Ukraine) Sergiy Stakhovsky	7^{7}	3	6
