= 2016 Gerry Weber Open =

- Date: 13–19 June
- Edition: 24th
- Category: ATP World Tour 500
- Draw: 32S / 16D
- Prize money: €1,700,610
- Surface: Grass
- Location: Halle, Germany
- Venue: Gerry Weber Stadion

Champions

Singles
- (Germany) Florian Mayer

Doubles
- (South Africa) Raven Klaasen / (United States) Rajeev Ram
← 2015 ·	Gerry Weber Open	· 2017 →

The 2016 Gerry Weber Open was a men's tennis tournament played on outdoor grass courts. It was the 24th edition of the event and part of the ATP World Tour 500 series of the 2016 ATP World Tour. It took place at the Gerry Weber Stadion in Halle, Germany, between 13 June and 19 June 2016. Unseeded Florian Mayer won the singles title

== Finals ==
=== Singles ===
- (Germany) Florian Mayer defeated (Germany) Alexander Zverev, 6–2, 5–7, 6–3

=== Doubles ===
- (South Africa) Raven Klaasen / (United States) Rajeev Ram defeated (Poland) Łukasz Kubot / (Austria) Alexander Peya, 7–6^{(7–5)}, 6–2

== Points and prize money ==
=== Point distribution ===
Event	W	F	SF	QF	Round of 16	Round of 32	Q	Q2	Q1
Singles	500	300	180	90	45	0	20	10	0
Doubles*	500	300	180	90	0	—	—	—	—

_{*per player}

=== Prize money ===
Event	W	F	SF	QF	Round of 16	Round of 32	Q	Q2	Q1
Singles	€386,925	€181,720	€90,235	€45,115	€22,860	€12,030	€0	€2,005	€1,105
Doubles	€114,070	€53,990	€26,000	€13,520	€7,080	—	—	—	—
Doubles prize money per team

== Singles main-draw entrants ==
=== Seeds ===
Country	Player	Rank^{1}	Seed
SUI	Roger Federer	3	1
JPN	Kei Nishikori	6	2
AUT	Dominic Thiem	7	3
CZE	Tomáš Berdych	8	4
BEL	David Goffin	11	5
ESP	David Ferrer	14	6
SRB	Viktor Troicki	21	7
GER	Philipp Kohlschreiber	26	8

- ^{1} Rankings are as of June 6, 2016.

=== Other entrants ===
The following players received wildcards into the singles main draw:

- (Germany) Dustin Brown
- (United States) Taylor Fritz
- (Germany) Jan-Lennard Struff

The following players using a protected ranking into the singles main draw:

- (United States) Brian Baker
- (Germany) Florian Mayer

The following players received entry from the qualifying draw:

- (Germany) Benjamin Becker
- (Latvia) Ernests Gulbis
- (Ukraine) Sergiy Stakhovsky
- (Japan) Yūichi Sugita

=== Withdrawals ===
Before the tournament

- (France) Gaël Monfils →replaced by (United States) Denis Kudla

During the tournament

- (Japan) Kei Nishikori

=== Retirements ===
- (Germany) Benjamin Becker
- (Ukraine) Sergiy Stakhovsky

== Doubles main-draw entrants ==
=== Seeds ===
Country	Player	Country	Player	Rank^{1}	Seed
USA	Bob Bryan	USA	Mike Bryan	9	1
POL	Łukasz Kubot	AUT	Alexander Peya	37	2
RSA	Raven Klaasen	USA	Rajeev Ram	45	3
FIN	Henri Kontinen	AUS	John Peers	48	4

- Rankings are as of June 6, 2016.

=== Other entrants ===
The following pairs received wildcards into the doubles main draw:

- (Austria) Julian Knowle / (Germany) Florian Mayer
- (Germany) Alexander Zverev / (Germany) Mischa Zverev

The following pair received entry from the qualifying draw:

- (United States) Brian Baker / (Uzbekistan) Denis Istomin

The following pair received entry as lucky losers:

- (Mexico) Santiago González / (United States) Scott Lipsky

=== Withdrawals ===
Before the tournament

- (Japan) Kei Nishikori
