= 2016 MercedesCup – Singles =

Singles
- 2016 MercedesCup

Final
- Champion: (Austria) Dominic Thiem
- Runner-up: (Germany) Philipp Kohlschreiber
- Score: 6–7^{(2–7)}, 6–4, 6–4

Details
- Draw: 28
- Seeds: 8

Events
Singles	Doubles
- Stuttgart Open

Rafael Nadal was the defending champion, but chose not to participate this year.

Third-seeded Dominic Thiem won the title, defeating Philipp Kohlschreiber in the final, 6–7^{(2–7)}, 6–4, 6–4.

== Seeds ==
The top four seeds receive a bye into the second round.

1. (Switzerland) Roger Federer (semifinals)
2. (Croatia) Marin Čilić (second round)
3. (Austria) Dominic Thiem (champion)
4. (France) Gilles Simon (quarterfinals)
5. (Spain) Feliciano López (first round)
6. (Serbia) Viktor Troicki (first round)
7. (Germany) Philipp Kohlschreiber (final)
8. (France) Lucas Pouille (first round)

== Draw ==
Key

- Q = Qualifier
- WC = Wild card
- LL = Lucky loser
- Alt = Alternate
- ITF = ITF entry
- PR = Protected ranking
- SR = Special ranking
- SE = Special exempt
- JE = Junior exempt
- JR = Junior Accelerator Programme entrant
- CO = College Accelerator Programme entrant
- NG = Next Gen Accelerator Program entrant
- w/o = Walkover
- r = Retired
- d = Defaulted

=== Finals ===
Semifinals
1	(Switzerland) Roger Federer	6	6^{7}	4
3	(Austria) Dominic Thiem	3	7^{9}	6
WC	(Argentina) Juan Martín del Potro	3	4
7	(Germany) Philipp Kohlschreiber	6	6

Final
3	(Austria) Dominic Thiem	6^{2}	6	6
7	(Germany) Philipp Kohlschreiber	7^{7}	4	4

=== Top half ===
First round
(United States) T Fritz	3	7^{8}	6
Q	(France) F Martin	6	6^{6}	1
(Tunisia) M Jaziri	7^{9}	2	4
WC	(Germany) M Berrer	6^{7}	6	6
Q	(Germany) F Mayer	6	7^{7}
6	(Serbia) V Troicki	4	6^{4}
(Australia) S Groth	7	6
(Ukraine) I Marchenko	5	4
WC	(Germany) J Choinski	3	0^{r}
Q	(Ukraine) S Stakhovsky	6	0
(Russia) M Youzhny	7^{7}	6
5	(Spain) F López	6^{3}	3

Second round
1	(Switzerland) R Federer	6	5	6
(United States) T Fritz	4	7	4
WC	(Germany) M Berrer	3	6	4
Q	(Germany) F Mayer	6	3	6
3	(Austria) D Thiem	7^{7}	7^{7}
(Australia) S Groth	6^{3}	6^{2}
Q	(Ukraine) S Stakhovsky	3	6^{1}
(Russia) M Youzhny	6	7^{7}

Quarterfinals
1	(Switzerland) R Federer	7^{7}	7^{7}
Q	(Germany) F Mayer	6^{2}	6^{1}
3	(Austria) D Thiem	3	6	7
(Russia) M Youzhny	6	4	5

Semifinals
1	(Switzerland) R Federer	6	6^{7}	4
3	(Austria) D Thiem	3	7^{9}	6

=== Bottom half ===
First round
8	(France) L Pouille	7^{7}	3	4
(Australia) J Millman	6^{3}	6	6
WC	(Argentina) JM del Potro	6	6
(Bulgaria) G Dimitrov	4	2
(Germany) J-L Struff	4	6	6
(Cyprus) M Baghdatis	6	1	4
7	(Germany) P Kohlschreiber	6	6
(France) P-H Herbert	4	1
(Serbia) D Lajović	0	2
(United States) D Kudla	6	6
(Uzbekistan) D Istomin	5	6	3
Q	(Czech Republic) R Štěpánek	7	3	6

Second round
(Australia) J Millman	4	4
WC	(Argentina) JM del Potro	6	6
(Germany) J-L Struff	4	6	2
4	(France) G Simon	6	4	6
7	(Germany) P Kohlschreiber	7	6
(United States) D Kudla	5	3
Q	(Czech Republic) R Štěpánek	7^{7}	7
2	(Croatia) M Čilić	6^{4}	5

Quarterfinals
WC	(Argentina) JM del Potro	6^{3}	6	6
4	(France) G Simon	7^{7}	3	0
7	(Germany) P Kohlschreiber	6	7
Q	(Czech Republic) R Štěpánek	4	5

Semifinals
WC	(Argentina) JM del Potro	3	4
7	(Germany) P Kohlschreiber	6	6

== Qualifying ==
=== Seeds ===
1. (Ukraine) Sergiy Stakhovsky (qualified)
2. (Georgia (country)) Nikoloz Basilashvili (first round)
3. (Japan) Yūichi Sugita (qualifying competition)
4. (Czech Republic) Radek Štěpánek (qualified)
5. (Bosnia and Herzegovina) Mirza Bašić (first round)
6. (Germany) Daniel Brands (first round)
7. (United Kingdom) James Ward (qualifying competition)
8. (France) Axel Michon (first round)

=== Qualifiers ===
1. (Ukraine) Sergiy Stakhovsky
2. (Germany) Florian Mayer
3. (France) Fabrice Martin
4. (Czech Republic) Radek Štěpánek

=== Qualifying draw ===
==== First qualifier ====
First round
1	(Ukraine) Sergiy Stakhovsky	6	3	6
(Czech Republic) Jan Mertl	4	6	1
WC	(Germany) Frank Moser	6	6^{5}	6
8	(France) Axel Michon	3	7^{7}	3

Qualifying competition
1	(Ukraine) Sergiy Stakhovsky	6	6
WC	(Germany) Frank Moser	4	4

==== Second qualifier ====
First round
2	(Georgia (country)) Nikoloz Basilashvili	7	6^{3}	6^{4}
WC	(Germany) Matthias Bachinger	5	7^{7}	7^{7}
(Germany) Florian Mayer	6	6
6	(Germany) Daniel Brands	2	4

Qualifying competition
WC	(Germany) Matthias Bachinger	6^{5}	3
(Germany) Florian Mayer	7^{7}	6

==== Third qualifier ====
First round
3	(Japan) Yūichi Sugita	6	6
(Ecuador) Giovanni Lapentti	3	1
Alt	(France) Fabrice Martin	7	7^{11}
5	(Bosnia and Herzegovina) Mirza Bašić	5	6^{9}

Qualifying competition
3	(Japan) Yūichi Sugita	6	6^{4}	6^{5}
Alt	(France) Fabrice Martin	4	7^{7}	7^{7}

==== Fourth qualifier ====
First round
4	(Czech Republic) Radek Štěpánek	6	6
(Croatia) Nikola Mektić	4	3
(Czech Republic) Jan Hernych	6^{6}	5
7	(United Kingdom) James Ward	7^{8}	7

Qualifying competition
4	(Czech Republic) Radek Štěpánek	6	6
7	(United Kingdom) James Ward	2	1
