= Baden Open =

ATP Challenger Tour
- Event name: Karlsruhe
- Location: Karlsruhe, Germany
- Venue: SSC Karlsruhe
- Category: ATP Challenger Tour
- Surface: Clay (red)
- Draw: 32S/32Q/16D
- Prize money: €30,000+H

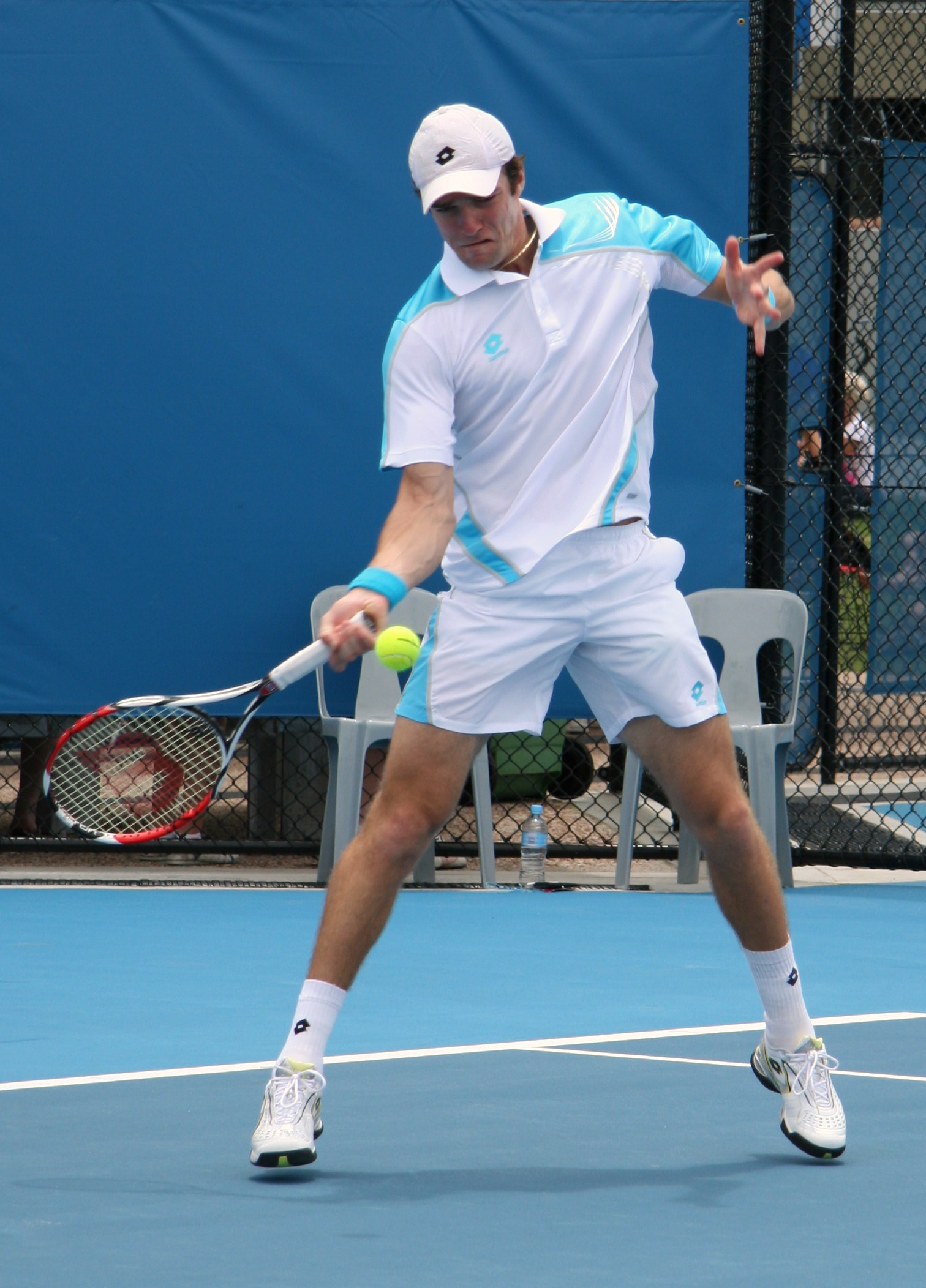
Russian Teymuraz Gabashvili, the latest singles champion, took the title in 2008 over Tobias Kamke

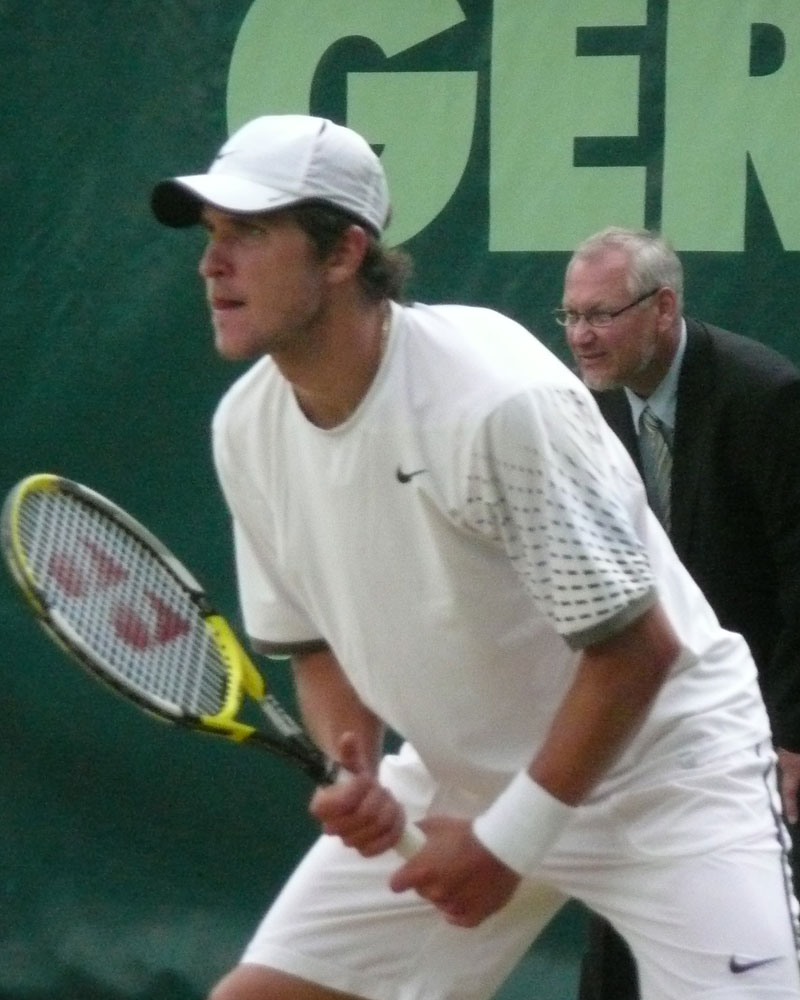
German player Mischa Zverev won both singles and doubles title in 2007, defeating Wayne Odesnik in the singles, partnering Alex Kuznetsov for the doubles

The Baden Open is a professional tennis tournament played on outdoor red clay courts. It is currently part of the Association of Tennis Professionals (ATP) Challenger Tour. It is held annually in Karlsruhe, Germany, since 1998 (as a club event from 1998 to 1999, as a Futures from 2000 to 2003, as a Challenger since 2005).

== Past finals ==
=== Singles ===
Location	Year	Champion	Runner-up	Score
Karlsruhe
Karlsruhe	2010	Not Held		
Karlsruhe	2009	(Germany) Florian Mayer	(Jamaica) Dustin Brown	6–2, 6–4
Karlsruhe	2008	(Russia) Teymuraz Gabashvili	(Germany) Tobias Kamke	6–1, 6–4
Karlsruhe	2007	(Germany) Mischa Zverev	(United States) Wayne Odesnik	2–6, 6–4, 6–3
Ettlingen	2006	(Germany) Simon Greul	(Germany) Michael Berrer	6–4, 6–3
Ettlingen	2005	(Chile) Adrián García	(Spain) Marc López	6–4, 6–4
Ettlingen	2004	Not Held		
Ettlingen	2003	(France) Julien Jeanpierre	(France) Jérôme Haehnel	5–7, 6–4, 7–5
Ettlingen	2002	(Belgium) Kristof Vliegen	(Germany) Daniel Elsner	6–1, 1–0 retired
Ettlingen	2001	(Spain) Marc López	(Argentina) Leonardo Olguín	6–3, 6–2
Ettlingen	2000	(Belgium) Olivier Rochus	(France) Nicolas Thomann	5–7, 6–2, 7–5
Ettlingen	1999	(Germany) Benedikt Dorsch		
Ettlingen	1998	(Argentina) Mariano Delfino		

=== Doubles ===
Location	Year	Champions	Runners-up	Score
Karlsruhe
Karlsruhe	2010	Not Held		
Karlsruhe	2009	(Australia) Rameez Junaid (Germany) Philipp Marx	(Poland) Tomasz Bednarek (Pakistan) Aisam-ul-Haq Qureshi	7–5, 6–4
Karlsruhe	2008	(Austria) Daniel Köllerer (Germany) Frank Moser	(South Korea) Jun Woong-sun (Australia) Joseph Sirianni	6–2, 7–5
Karlsruhe	2007	(United States) Alex Kuznetsov (Germany) Mischa Zverev	(Germany) Michael Berrer (Portugal) Frederico Gil	6–4, 6–7(6), 10–4
Ettlingen	2006	(Greece) Vasilis Mazarakis (Chile) Felipe Parada	(Germany) Lars Burgsmüller (Germany) Simon Greul	3–6, 6–1, 10–4
Ettlingen	2005	(Spain) Marc López (Spain) Albert Portas	(Belgium) Jeroen Masson (Spain) Gabriel Trujillo Soler	3–6, 6–1, 7–5
Ettlingen	2004	Not Held		
Ettlingen	2003	(Sweden) Daniel Andersson (Belgium) Stefan Wauters	(Germany) Philipp Petzschner (Germany) Aljoscha Thron	4–6, 6–2, 6–2
Ettlingen	2002	(Germany) Frank Moser (Germany) Martin Woisetschlager	(Germany) Markus Bayer (Germany) Philipp Gruendler	walkover
Ettlingen	2001	(Argentina) Leonardo Olguín (Argentina) Martín Vassallo Argüello	(Netherlands) Bobbie Altelaar (Germany) Jan Weinzierl	3–6, 6–3, 6–4
Ettlingen	2000	(Argentina) Enzo Artoni (Argentina) Francisco Cabello	(Belgium) Olivier Rochus (Belgium) Réginald Willems	6–3, 6–3
Ettlingen	1999	Doubles Not Held		
Ettlingen	1998	Doubles Not Held		
