= Florian Mayer =

German tennis player

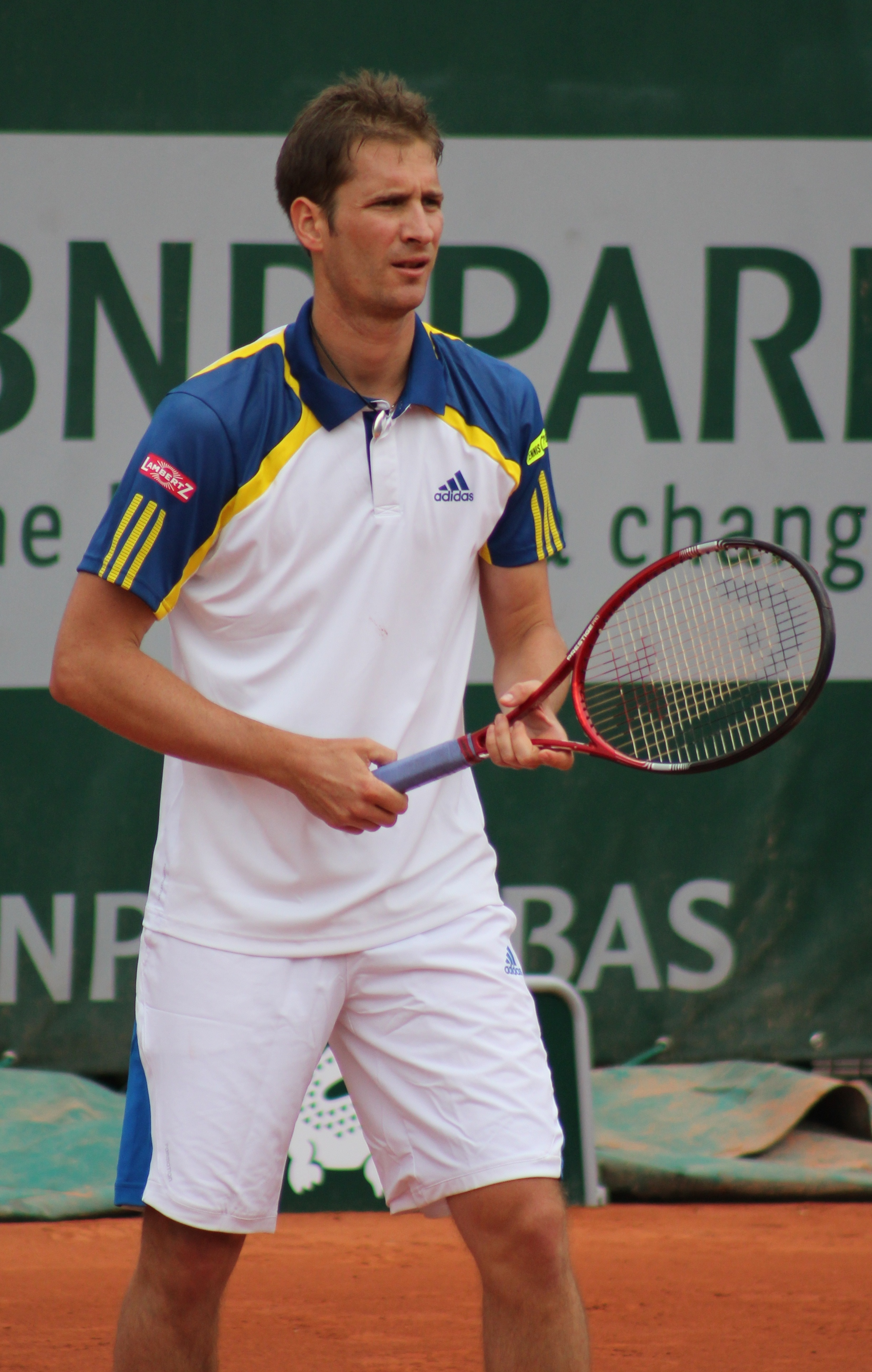
- Mayer at the 2013 French Open
- Country (sports): Germany
- Residence: Bayreuth, Germany
- Born: 5 October 1983 (age 42) Bayreuth, West Germany
- Height: 1.91 m (6 ft 3 in)
- Turned pro: 2001
- Retired: 2018
- Plays: Right-handed (two-handed backhand)
- Coach: Tobias Summerer (2009–2018)
- Prize money: US$7,278,992

Singles
- Career record: 243–261
- Career titles: 2
- Highest ranking: No. 18 (6 June 2011)

Grand Slam singles results
- Australian Open: 4R (2014)
- French Open: 2R (2004, 2011, 2012)
- Wimbledon: QF (2004, 2012)
- US Open: 3R (2011, 2013)

Doubles
- Career record: 51–111
- Career titles: 0
- Highest ranking: No. 47 (18 June 2012)

Grand Slam doubles results
- Australian Open: 2R (2008, 2011)
- French Open: 2R (2015, 2016, 2017)
- Wimbledon: 2R (2005, 2007)
- US Open: 3R (2004, 2010)

Team competitions
- Davis Cup: QF (2008, 2011, 2014)

Florian Mayer (German pronunciation: [ˈfloːʁi̯aːn ˈmaɪɐ]; born 5 October 1983) is a German former professional tennis player.

Mayer reached his career-high singles ranking of world No. 18 in June 2011. Also in 2011, Mayer won his first ATP Tour title after four previous defeats in ATP finals.

Mayer competed at the 2004 Summer Olympics. At the 2004 Wimbledon Championships, Mayer reached the quarter-finals, which is his best Grand Slam result to date. He received the ATP Newcomer of the Year award in 2004. Eight years later, Mayer made his second Grand Slam quarter-final, once again at Wimbledon.

The biggest win of his career came at the 2011 Shanghai Rolex Masters when he upset twenty-time Grand Slam champion Rafael Nadal in the round of 16.

Mayer was known for his unorthodox style of play. He had a long backswing on his forehand and backhand and used many different slices and spin on his backhand side. He was also known for his jumping backhand dropshots which caught many of his opponents on the backfoot.

Mayer retired from professional tennis after the 2018 US Open.

== Career ==
=== 2009 ===
Mayer made a return from injury reaching the final of the Nouméa Challenger but losing to Brendan Evans. Mayer then qualified for the main draw of the Australian Open by beating Sergey Bubka, Blaž Kavčič and Amer Delić. There he beat Lamine Ouahab in the first round, and then lost to Juan Martín del Potro in the second round.

=== 2010 ===
Mayer reached the third round at the 2010 Australian Open, defeating Philipp Petzschner and Viktor Troicki. He then lost to Juan Martín del Potro in four sets. At Wimbledon in 2010, Mayer beat 11th seed Marin Čilić in straight sets to reach the second round, where he defeated Mardy Fish in four sets. He then lost to Lu Yen-hsun in the third round. He also reached the quarterfinals at the Mercedes Cup in Stuttgart, losing to Gaël Monfils, and the semifinal in Hamburg, losing to eventual champion Andrey Golubev. At the Shanghai Rolex Masters, he lost to Jo-Wilfried Tsonga in the third round, after defeating Kevin Anderson and Mikhail Youzhny in the first two rounds. Mayer reached the final at the If Stockholm Open, after beating Jarkko Nieminen in a tight semifinal, saving a match point. Mayer also beat world No. 5 Robin Söderling and two-time Wimbledon quarterfinalist Feliciano López en route to the final, where he lost 4–6, 3–6, to the 16-Grand Slam titles holder Roger Federer.

He went 23–18 on the season and earned $513,955.

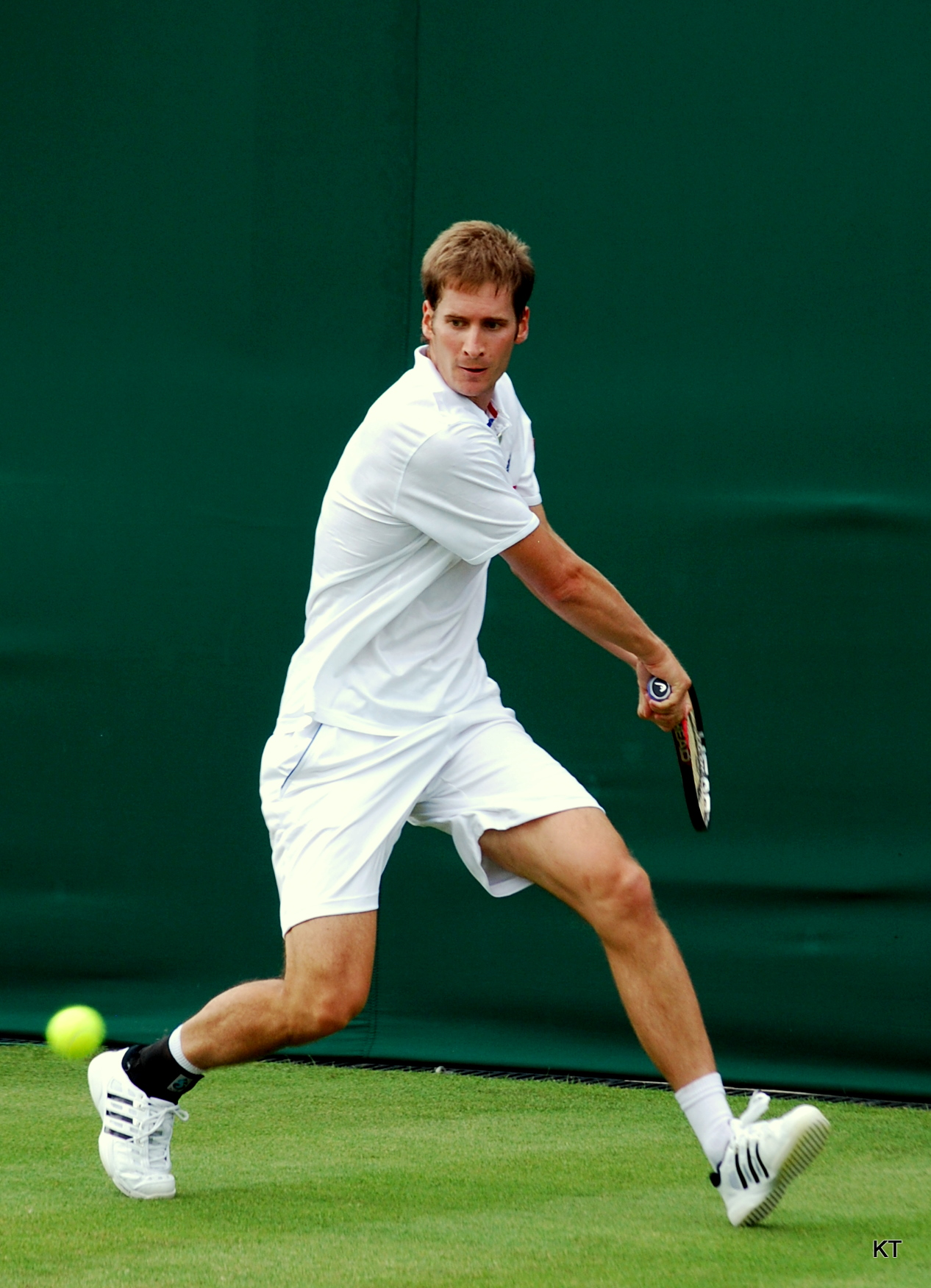
Mayer at 2011 Wimbledon.

=== 2011 ===
Mayer started the new season in style. In preparation for the Australian Open, he reached the quarterfinals of the Brisbane International and the semifinals of the Sydney International. At the first Grand Slam tournament of the season in Melbourne, Mayer surprisingly defeated Doha finalist Nikolay Davydenko in four sets, only to lose against Japanese Kei Nishikori in the second round. Two weeks later, he came through to his second semifinals of the year in Zagreb. On his way to this stage, he defeated top seed Marin Čilić, 6–3, 6–4. He lost the semifinal against countryman Michael Berrer. With this result, he was the new German no. 1 in the ATP ranking. At the 2011 BMW Open in Munich, Mayer reached his fourth career final. He was again not able to capture his maiden ATP World Tour title, after losing to Nikolay Davydenko in three sets. Two days after this loss, he managed to beat Viktor Troicki in three sets in the first round of the Mutua Madrid Open. He had to retire in the second round against Thomaz Bellucci. He rose to a new career-high rank of no. 28.

Mayer reached the quarterfinals of the Italian Open in Rome. After three straight-set wins, Mayer could not keep up the momentum against Andy Murray, after having won the first set. He went on to lose, 6–1, 1–6, 1–6.

Again he rose to a new career-high rank of No. 21.

By winning three out of three matches at the World Team Cup in Düsseldorf, Mayer was the key player in the German team to capture the trophy for the fifth time. He improved to no. 19. The German, however, could not overcome the second round of Roland Garros and Wimbledon, losing in fourth sets in both cases against Alejandro Falla and Xavier Malisse, as he did in the Australian Open. In addition, he lost his Davis Cup quarterfinal match against Richard Gasquet, despite serving for the match in the third set.

Two weeks later, he reached the Hamburg ATP 500 quarterfinals, losing in straight tiebreaks to third seed Nicolás Almagro. However, in the ATP World Tour Masters 1000 of Montreal and Cincinnati, he lost in first round to Richard Gasquet and Ivo Karlović, respectively. Mayer then reached the third round in the US Open (won to Mannarino and Lisnard, but lost in the round of 32 to fifth seed Ferrer), to achieve his best Grand Slam result of the year. He won his first title in Bucharest, defeating Pablo Andújar in the final 6–3, 6–1. On 13 October 2011, Mayer defeated world No. 2 Rafael Nadal in a brilliant display of tennis 7–6, 6–3.

=== 2012 ===
Mayer withdrew from the Australian Open due to injury. He couldn't win consecutively until the Miami Masters, where he defeated Ivan Dodig and Indian Wells finalist John Isner. He then lost in the fourth round to Jo-Wilfried Tsonga.

Mayer reached the Wimbledon quarterfinals for the first time since 2004 Wimbledon. In the quarterfinals, he lost to top seed Novak Djokovic.

=== 2013 ===
Mayer reached quarter-final of Shanghai Masters and defeated French Open finalist David Ferrer.

=== 2014 ===
Mayer first played in Doha. He defeated Michał Przysiężny, then third seeded Andy Murray who returned from injury layoff, then Victor Hănescu who upset Fernando Verdasco. He then lost to Gaël Monfils in the semifinals. He reached the fourth round for the first time at the Australian Open. He defeated 14th seed Mikhail Youzhny in the second round, then 20th seed Jerzy Janowicz in straight sets in the third round. In the fourth round, he was defeated by 3rd seed David Ferrer in four sets.

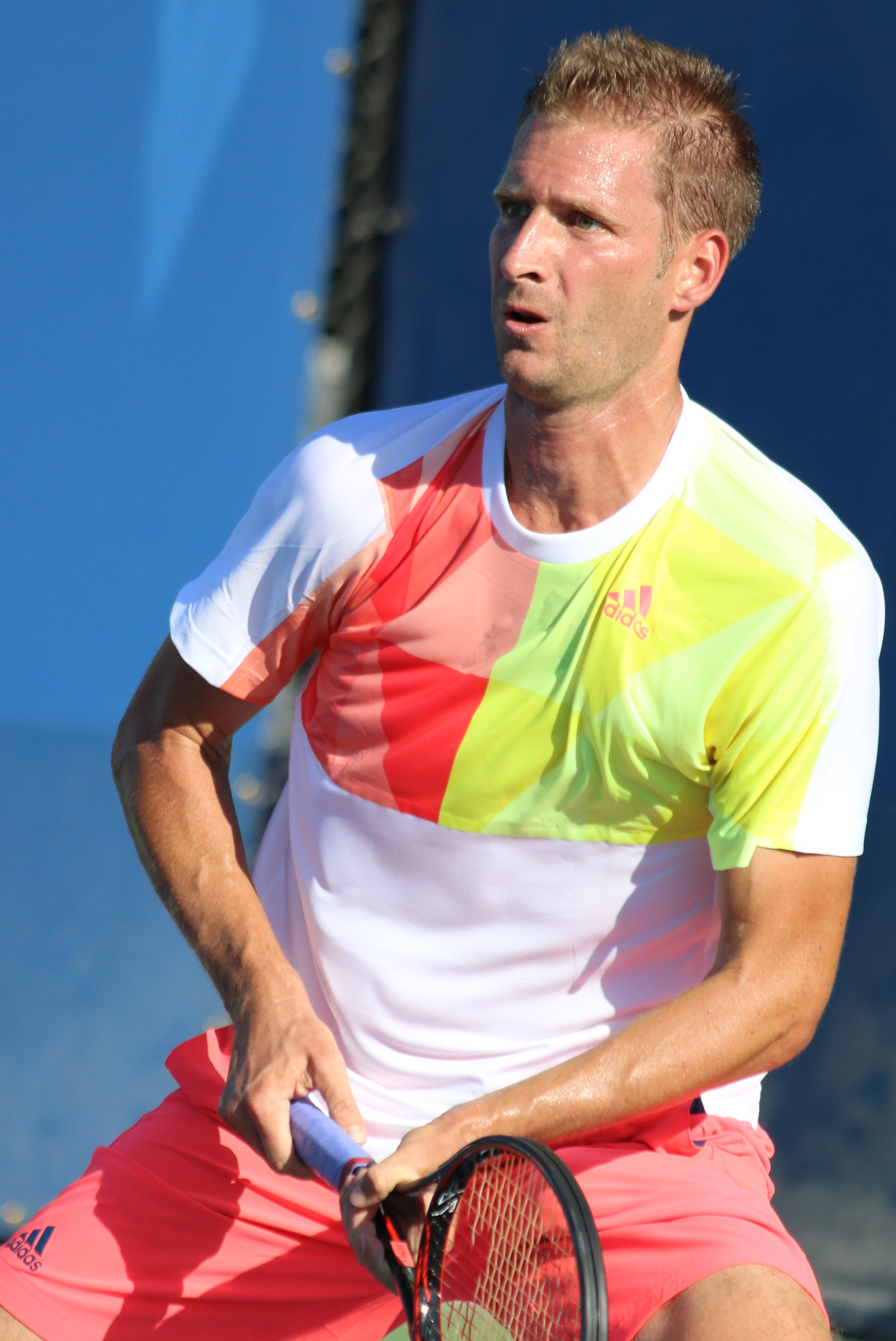
Mayer at the 2016 US Open.

=== 2016 ===
Mayer won the Gerry Weber Open in Halle, defeating Andreas Seppi in the quarterfinal, world No. 7 Dominic Thiem in the semifinal and Alexander Zverev in the final, for his first victory in his career on German soil and his first victory at an ATP 500 tournament. Mayer won the final 6–2, 5–7, 6–3. As a result of this victory, Mayer's ranking rose 112 places from 192 to 80.

=== 2017 ===
Mayer got to the final at the 2017 German Open in Hamburg where he lost to namesake Leonardo Mayer in three sets.

=== 2018 ===
Mayer played his last match on the ATP tour at the 2018 US Open, losing to Borna Ćorić in four sets in the first round.

== Playing style ==
Mayer is an all-court player known for his unique and creative style of play. He has an unusually long take-back on both his forehand and two-handed backhand and generally hits more top-spin than flat on both wings. Despite his height, his groundstrokes and serve lack power, but are consistent and unpredictable. He uses a variety of spins on both wings to mix his shots up and hit drop-shots. He is well known for his double-handed backhand slice, similar to that of Fabrice Santoro and Jimmy Connors, and often pulls off jumping backhands and jumping slice drop-shots which catch his opponents off guard. His drop-shots are particularly effective on clay and grass, where he has had most success. Despite having a weaker, top-spin serve, Mayer occasionally serve and volleys and is also known for his two-handed backhand cutting volley. He also often uses a chip and charge tactic during points to finish points off. This makes him unpredictable and tricky to play against.

Mayer's biggest weaknesses are his lack of match consistency and fitness, having had inconsistent results throughout his career and a relatively lean build. He has also suffered from numerous injuries throughout his career, most notably his groin injury in 2015 that prevented him from playing for more than a year.

== Performance timelines ==
Key
W	F	SF	QF	#R	RR	Q#	DNQ	A	NH

(W) winner; (F) finalist; (SF) semifinalist; (QF) quarterfinalist; (#R) rounds 4, 3, 2, 1; (RR) round-robin stage; (Q#) qualification round; (DNQ) did not qualify; (A) absent; (NH) not held; (SR) strike rate (events won / competed); (W–L) win–loss record.

=== Singles ===
Tournament	2001	2002	2003	2004	2005	2006	2007	2008	2009	2010	2011	2012	2013	2014	2015	2016	2017	2018	SR	W–L	Win %
Grand Slam tournaments
Australian Open	A	A	A	2R	1R	2R	3R	1R	2R	3R	2R	A	2R	4R	A	A	1R	1R	0 / 12	12–12	50%
French Open	A	A	A	2R	1R	1R	1R	A	A	A	2R	2R	1R	A	1R	1R	1R	1R	0 / 11	3–11	21%
Wimbledon	A	A	A	QF	3R	2R	2R	A	A	3R	2R	QF	1R	A	1R	1R	2R	1R	0 / 12	16–12	57%
US Open	A	A	A	2R	1R	2R	1R	A	A	1R	3R	1R	3R	A	1R	1R	2R	1R	0 / 12	7–12	37%
Win–loss	0–0	0–0	0–0	7–4	2–4	3–4	4–4	0–1	1–1	3–3	5–4	5–3	3–4	3–1	0–3	0–3	2–4	0–4	0 / 47	38–47	45%
ATP World Tour Masters 1000
Indian Wells Masters	A	A	A	Q1	1R	2R	2R	1R	A	1R	1R	2R	3R	2R	A	A	A	A	0 / 9	3–9	25%
Miami Open	A	A	A	Q2	4R	1R	3R	1R	A	2R	4R	4R	2R	3R	A	A	1R	A	0 / 10	12–9	57%
Monte-Carlo Masters	A	A	A	A	2R	Q1	1R	Q1	A	A	2R	1R	3R	A	2R	A	1R	1R	0 / 8	5–8	38%
Madrid Open	NH	A	A	1R	A	A	A	A	A	A	2R	1R	2R	A	A	A	2R	Q2	0 / 5	3–5	38%
Italian Open	A	A	A	1R	1R	A	A	A	A	A	QF	2R	A	A	1R	A	2R	Q1	0 / 6	5–6	45%
Canadian Open	A	A	A	A	A	A	A	A	A	A	1R	2R	2R	A	A	A	A	A	0 / 3	1–3	25%
Cincinnati Masters	A	A	A	A	A	A	1R	A	A	1R	1R	2R	1R	A	A	A	A	A	0 / 5	1–5	17%
Shanghai Masters	not held								2R	3R	QF	2R	QF	A	A	1R	Q1	A	0 / 6	10–5	67%
Paris Masters	A	A	A	A	A	A	A	A	A	A	2R	1R	A	A	A	A	A	A	0 / 2	1–2	33%
German Open	A	A	A	3R	1R	1R	2R	A	not Masters series										0 / 4	3–4	43%
Win–loss	0–0	0–0	0–0	2–3	4–5	1–3	4–5	0–2	1–1	3–4	12–9	5–8	8–7	1–1	1–2	0–1	2–4	0–1	0 / 58	44–56	44%
National representation
Summer Olympics	not held			1R	not held			A	not held			A	not held			A	not held		0 / 1	0–1	0%
Davis Cup	A	A	A	PO	A	PO	A	QF	A	PO	QF	1R	1R	QF	A	PO	A	A	0 / 5	10–9	53%
Win–loss	0–0	0–0	0–0	0–3	0–0	2–0	0–0	0–1	0–0	2–0	0–2	2–2	2–1	1–0	0–0	1–1	0–0	0–0	0 / 6	10–10	50%
Career statistics
	2001	2002	2003	2004	2005	2006	2007	2008	2009	2010	2011	2012	2013	2014	2015	2016	2017	2018	Career		
Tournaments	0	0	0	17	24	21	23	9	6	19	25	24	25	7	9	12	17	15	253		
Titles	0	0	0	0	0	0	0	0	0	0	1	0	0	0	0	1	0	0	2		
Finals	0	0	0	0	1	1	0	0	0	1	2	0	0	0	0	1	1	0	7		
Hard Win–loss	0–0	0–0	0–0	3–8	5–8	9–10	10–12	2–7	2–5	13–13	23–16	9–12	15–15	8–6	0–1	2–5	1–8	0–5	102–131		44%
Clay Win–loss	0–0	0–0	0–0	12–8	11–13	13–8	5–11	0–3	1–1	8–4	19–8	9–12	12–9	0–0	2–6	2–5	6–6	0–6	100–100		50%
Grass Win–loss	0–0	0–0	0–0	4–2	3–2	3–2	3–2	0–0	0–0	2–1	3–2	5–2	2–2	0–0	2–2	6–2	3–3	2–4	38–26		59%
Carpet Win–loss	0–0	0–0	0–0	0–1	2–2	1–1	0–0	0–0	discontinued										3–4		43%
Overall win–loss	0–0	0–0	0–0	19–19	21–25	26–21	18–25	2–10	3–6	23–18	45–26	23–26	29–26	8–6	4–9	10–12	10–17	2–15	243–261		
Win %	–	–	–	50%	43%	55%	42%	17%	33%	56%	64%	47%	53%	57%	31%	45%	37%	12%	48.21%		
Year-end ranking	873	393	250	35	72	56	55	409	61	37	23	28	40	147	217	50	69	256			

=== Doubles ===
Tournament	2004	2005	2006	2007	2008	2009	2010	2011	2012	2013	2014	2015	2016	2017	2018	SR	W–L
Grand Slam tournaments
Australian Open	A	A	1R	1R	2R	A	1R	2R	A	A	1R	A	A	1R	1R	0 / 8	2–7
French Open	A	1R	A	1R	A	A	A	1R	A	1R	A	2R	2R	2R	1R	0 / 8	3–8
Wimbledon	1R	2R	1R	2R	A	A	A	A	A	A	A	A	A	A	A	0 / 4	2–4
US Open	3R	1R	2R	1R	A	A	3R	2R	A	1R	A	1R	1R	2R	A	0 / 10	6–10
Win–loss	2–2	1–3	1–3	1–4	1–0	0–0	2–2	2–3	0–0	0–2	0–1	1–2	1–2	2–3	0–2	0 / 30	13–29
ATP World Tour Masters 1000
Indian Wells Masters	A	A	A	A	A	A	A	A	2R	2R	1R	A	A	A	A	0 / 3	2–3
Miami Open	A	1R	A	A	A	A	A	1R	1R	1R	1R	A	A	A	A	0 / 5	0–5
Monte-Carlo Masters	A	A	A	A	A	A	A	A	QF	2R	A	2R	A	A	A	0 / 3	4–3
Madrid Open	A	A	A	A	A	A	A	A	A	1R	A	A	A	A	A	0 / 1	0–1
Italian Open	A	A	A	A	A	A	A	A	A	A	A	A	A	A	A	0 / 0	0–0
Canadian Open	A	A	A	A	A	A	A	SF	2R	A	A	A	A	A	A	0 / 2	4–2
Cincinnati Masters	A	A	A	A	A	A	A	SF	1R	A	A	A	A	A	A	0 / 2	3–2
Shanghai Masters	not held					A	1R	A	A	1R	A	A	A	A	A	0 / 2	0–2
Paris Masters	A	A	A	A	A	A	A	1R	1R	A	A	A	A	A	A	0 / 2	0–2
Win–loss	0–0	0–1	0–0	0–0	0–0	0–0	0–1	6–4	4–6	2–5	0–2	1–1	0–0	0–0	0–0	0 / 20	13–20
Career statistics
Titles / Finals	0 / 0	0 / 1	0 / 0	0 / 0	0 / 0	0 / 0	0 / 0	0 / 0	0 / 0	0 / 0	0 / 0	0 / 0	0 / 0	0 / 0	0 / 0	0 / 1	
Overall win–loss	2–7	5–10	2–5	2–7	5–2	0–0	3–10	12–16	7–13	3–13	1–6	3–6	2–5	4–7	0–4	51–111	
Year-end ranking	234	171	382	267	272	773	181	63	137	239	348	303	382	205	539	31%	

== ATP Tour finals ==
=== Singles: 7 (2 titles, 5 runner-ups) ===
Legend Grand Slam tournaments ATP World Tour Finals ATP World Tour Masters 1000 ATP World Tour 500 Series (1–1) ATP International Series / ATP World Tour 250 Series (1–4)	Finals by surface Hard (0–1) Clay (1–4) Grass (1–0)

Result	W–L	Date	Tournament	Tier	Surface	Opponent	Score
Loss	0–1	Aug 2005	Orange Warsaw Open, Poland	International	Clay	(France) Gaël Monfils	6–7^{(6–8)}, 6–4, 5–7
Loss	0–2	Aug 2006	Orange Warsaw Open, Poland	International	Clay	(Russia) Nikolay Davydenko	6–7^{(6–8)}, 7–5, 4–6
Loss	0–3	Oct 2010	Stockholm Open, Sweden	250 Series	Hard (i)	(Switzerland) Roger Federer	4–6, 3–6
Loss	0–4	May 2011	Bavarian Championships, Germany	250 Series	Clay	(Russia) Nikolay Davydenko	3–6, 6–3, 1–6
Win	1–4	Sep 2011	Romanian Open, Romania	250 Series	Clay	(Spain) Pablo Andújar	6–3, 6–1
Win	2–4	Jun 2016	Halle Open, Germany	500 Series	Grass	(Germany) Alexander Zverev	6–2, 5–7, 6–3
Loss	2–5	Jul 2017	German Open, Germany	500 Series	Clay	(Argentina) Leonardo Mayer	4–6, 6–4, 3–6

=== Doubles: 1 (1 runner-up) ===
Result	W–L	Date	Tournament	Tier	Surface	Partner	Opponents	Score
Loss	0–1	May 2005	Bavarian Championships, Germany	International	Clay	(Germany) Alexander Waske	(Croatia) Mario Ančić (Austria) Julian Knowle	3–6, 6–1, 3–6

=== Team competition: 2 (2 titles) ===
Result	W–L	Year	Tournament	Surface	Partners	Opponents	Score
Win	1–0	2005	World Team Cup, Germany	Clay	(Germany) Tommy Haas (Germany) Nicolas Kiefer (Germany) Alexander Waske	(Argentina) Guillermo Cañas (Argentina) Juan Ignacio Chela (Argentina) Guillermo Coria (Argentina) Gastón Gaudio	2–1
Win	2–0	2011	World Team Cup, Germany	Clay	(Germany) Philipp Kohlschreiber (Germany) Philipp Petzschner (Germany) Christopher Kas	(Argentina) Juan Mónaco (Argentina) Juan Ignacio Chela (Argentina) Máximo González	2–1

== ATP Challenger and ITF Futures finals ==
=== Singles: 25 (14–11) ===
Legend
ATP Challenger (13–9)
ITF Futures (1–2)

Result	W–L	Date	Tournament	Tier	Surface	Opponent	Score
Loss	0–1	Dec 2002	Gran Canaria, Spain	Futures	Clay	(Spain) Rafael Nadal	6–7^{(3–7)}, 4–6
Loss	0–2	Feb 2003	Lisboa, Portugal	Futures	Clay	(Argentina) Juan Pablo Brzezicki	3–6, 2–6
Win	1–0	Jul 2003	St. Petersburg, Russia	Challenger	Clay	(Slovakia) Michal Mertiňák	4–6, 7–6^{(7–3)}, 6–1
Win	1–2	Nov 2003	Gran Canaria, Spain	Futures	Clay	(Spain) Iván Navarro	6–4, 6–2
Loss	1–1	Feb 2004	Wolfsburg, Germany	Challenger	Clay	(Czech Republic) Michal Tabara	4–6, 3–6
Win	2–1	Mar 2004	Mexico City, Mexico	Challenger	Clay	(Chile) Adrián García	6–4, 6–3
Win	3–1	Jun 2006	Fürth, Germany	Challenger	Clay	(Germany) Torsten Popp	6–3, 6–1
Win	4–1	Jul 2006	Tampere, Finland	Challenger	Clay	(Latvia) Ernests Gulbis	7–6^{(7–4)}, 2–6, 6–3
Win	5–1	Aug 2006	Graz, Austria	Challenger	Hard	(Germany) Rainer Schüttler	6–4, 5–7, 6–2
Loss	5–2	May 2007	Dresden, Germany	Challenger	Clay	(Kazakhstan) Yuri Schukin	6–7^{(5–7)}, 6–7^{(3–7)}
Loss	5–3	Jun 2007	Prostějov, Czech Republic	Challenger	Clay	(Argentina) Sergio Roitman	6–7^{(1–7)}, 4–6
Loss	5–4	Jun 2007	Braunschweig, Germany	Challenger	Clay	(Spain) Óscar Hernández	2–6, 6–1, 1–6
Loss	5–5	Jan 2009	Nouméa, New Caledonia	Challenger	Hard	(United States) Brendan Evans	6–4, 3–6, 4–6
Win	6–5	Mar 2009	Bangkok, Thailand	Challenger	Hard	(Thailand) Danai Udomchoke	7–5, 6–2
Loss	6–6	Apr 2009	Sofia, Bulgaria	Challenger	Clay	(Czech Republic) Ivo Minář	4–6, 3–6
Win	7–6	Jun 2009	Karlsruhe, Germany	Challenger	Clay	(Jamaica) Dustin Brown	6–2, 6–4
Loss	7–7	Aug 2009	Istanbul, Turkey	Challenger	Hard	(Ukraine) Illya Marchenko	4–6, 4–6
Win	8–7	Jan 2010	Nouméa, New Caledonia	Challenger	Hard	(Italy) Flavio Cipolla	6–3, 6–0
Win	9–7	Mar 2010	Sunrise, United States	Challenger	Hard	(France) Gilles Simon	6–4, 6–4
Loss	9–8	Apr 2010	Rome, Italy	Challenger	Clay	(Argentina) Federico Delbonis	4–6, 3–6
Win	10–8	Jun 2012	Prostějov, Czech Republic	Challenger	Clay	(Czech Republic) Jan Hájek	7–6^{(7–1)}, 3–6, 7–6^{(7–3)}
Win	11–8	Jul 2013	Braunschweig, Germany	Challenger	Clay	(Czech Republic) Jiří Veselý	4–6, 6–2, 6–1
Win	12–8	Aug 2016	Portorož, Slovenia	Challenger	Hard	(Russia) Daniil Medvedev	6–1, 6–2
Win	13–8	Aug 2016	Meerbusch, Germany	Challenger	Clay	(Germany) Maximilian Marterer	7–6^{(7–4)}, 6–2
Loss	13–9	Sep 2017	Szczecin, Poland	Challenger	Clay	(France) Richard Gasquet	6–7^{(3–7)}, 6–7^{(4–7)}

== Record against top 10 players ==
Player	Years	Matches	Record	Win %	Hard	Clay	Grass	Carpet
Number 1 ranked players								
(Australia) Lleyton Hewitt	2006–2012	2	1–1	50%	0–1	1–0	–	–
(Spain) Rafael Nadal	2011–2017	3	1–2	33%	1–1	0–1	–	–
(United Kingdom) Andy Murray	2011–2014	4	1–3	25%	1–1	0–2	–	–
(Spain) Juan Carlos Ferrero	2005–2010	5	1–4	20%	0–2	1–1	0–1	–
(United States) Andre Agassi	2004	1	0–1	0%	0–1	–	–	–
(United States) Andy Roddick	2006	1	0–1	0%	–	–	0–1	–
(Russia) Marat Safin	2004	1	0–1	0%	0–1	–	–	–
(Serbia) Novak Djokovic	2010–2014	5	0–5	0%	0–3	–	0–2	–
(Switzerland) Roger Federer	2005–2017	8	0–8	0%	0–2	0–1	0–5	–
Number 2 ranked players								
(Germany) Tommy Haas	2004–2013	5	0–5	0%	0–2	0–3	–	–
Number 3 ranked players								
(Germany) Alexander Zverev	2016	1	1–0	100%	–	–	1–0	–
(Argentina) Guillermo Coria	2004–2005	3	2–1	67%	–	1–1	1–0	–
(Bulgaria) Grigor Dimitrov	2011–2013	2	1–1	50%	–	1–1	–	–
(Canada) Milos Raonic	2012–2016	2	1–1	50%	0–1	1–0	–	–
(Austria) Dominic Thiem	2016	2	1–1	50%	–	–	1–1	–
(Argentina) Juan Martín del Potro	2006–2012	5	2–3	40%	1–2	1–1	–	–
(Russia) Nikolay Davydenko	2006–2013	8	3–5	38%	1–3	1–2	1–0	–
(Spain) David Ferrer	2004–2014	8	3–5	38%	1–3	2–2	–	–
(Croatia) Marin Čilić	2010–2017	7	2–5	29%	1–3	0–1	1–1	–
(Croatia) Ivan Ljubičić	2006–2011	4	1–3	25%	1–3	–	–	–
(Argentina) David Nalbandian	2004–2012	4	1–3	25%	1–1	0–1	–	0–1
(Greece) Stefanos Tsitsipas	2018	1	0–1	0%	0–1	–	–	–
(Switzerland) Stan Wawrinka	2006–2011	2	0–2	0%	0–2	–	–	–
Number 4 ranked players								
(Sweden) Robin Söderling	2004–2010	4	2–2	50%	2–1	0–1	–	–
(Germany) Nicolas Kiefer	2005	2	1–1	50%	1–0	–	–	0–1
(United States) James Blake	2005–2013	5	1–4	20%	1–4	–	–	–
(Czech Republic) Tomáš Berdych	2004–2013	6	1–5	17%	1–4	0–1	–	–
(Sweden) Thomas Enqvist	2005	1	0–1	0%	0–1	–	–	–
(United Kingdom) Tim Henman	2004	1	0–1	0%	–	0–1	–	–
(Japan) Kei Nishikori	2008–2011	2	0–2	0%	0–2	–	–	–
(France) Sébastien Grosjean	2004–2010	3	0–3	0%	0–2	–	0–1	–
Number 5 ranked players								
(Chile) Fernando González	2004–2005	2	2–0	100%	1–0	1–0	–	–
(Spain) Tommy Robredo	2006–2016	6	3–3	50%	2–3	1–0	–	–
(South Africa) Kevin Anderson	2010–2015	2	1–1	50%	1–0	0–1	–	–
(Argentina) Gastón Gaudio	2004–2006	2	1–1	50%	–	1–1	–	–
(Czech Republic) Jiří Novák	2004	2	1–1	50%	–	1–0	–	0–1
(Germany) Rainer Schüttler	2004–2009	3	1–2	33%	–	1–2	–	–
(Russia) Andrey Rublev	2017	1	0–1	0%	0–1	–	–	–
(France) Jo-Wilfried Tsonga	2010–2016	6	0–6	0%	0–6	–	–	–
Number 6 ranked players								
(South Africa) Wayne Ferreira	2004	1	1–0	100%	–	–	1–0	–
(France) Gilles Simon	2006	1	1–0	100%	–	1–0	–	–
(Slovakia) Karol Kučera	2004	1	0–1	0%	0–1	–	–	–
(France) Gaël Monfils	2005–2014	5	0–5	0%	0–1	0–3	0–1	–
Number 7 ranked players								
(Spain) Fernando Verdasco	2005–2007	4	3–1	75%	1–0	1–1	1–0	–
(Belgium) David Goffin	2013–2017	4	2–2	50%	1–1	1–1	–	–
(France) Richard Gasquet	2004–2018	8	3–5	38%	1–3	0–1	2–1	–
(United States) Mardy Fish	2007–2011	4	1–3	25%	0–3	–	1–0	–
(Croatia) Mario Ančić	2005	1	0–1	0%	–	0–1	–	–
(Sweden) Thomas Johansson	2005	1	0–1	0%	0–1	–	–	–
Number 8 ranked players								
(Serbia) Janko Tipsarević	2010–2011	2	2–0	100%	2–0	–	–	–
(Poland) Hubert Hurkacz	2016	1	1–0	100%	–	1–0	–	–
(Austria) Jürgen Melzer	2011	1	1–0	100%	–	1–0	–	–
(Australia) Mark Philippoussis	2006	1	1–0	100%	1–0	–	–	–
(Argentina) Diego Schwartzman	2017	1	1–0	100%	–	1–0	–	–
(Czech Republic) Radek Štěpánek	2004–2011	4	3–1	75%	2–1	1–0	–	–
(Russia) Mikhail Youzhny	2004–2015	9	6–3	67%	2–1	3–1	1–1	–
(United States) John Isner	2012–2017	3	1–2	33%	1–1	0–1	–	–
(Argentina) Guillermo Cañas	2004	1	0–1	0%	–	0–1	–	–
(United States) Jack Sock	2012	1	0–1	0%	0–1	–	–	–
(Cyprus) Marcos Baghdatis	2007–2013	2	0–2	0%	0–1	–	0–1	–
Number 9 ranked players								
(Italy) Fabio Fognini	2011–2012	3	3–0	100%	3–0	–	–	–
(Sweden) Joachim Johansson	2004	1	1–0	100%	–	–	1–0	–
(Thailand) Paradorn Srichaphan	2004	1	1–0	100%	–	1–0	–	–
(Spain) Roberto Bautista Agut	2013–2018	3	1–2	33%	0–1	1–1	–	–
(Spain) Nicolás Almagro	2006–2011	5	1–4	20%	1–1	0–2	–	0–1
(Argentina) Mariano Puerta	2005	1	0–1	0%	–	0–1	–	–
Number 10 ranked players								
(France) Lucas Pouille	2017	1	1–0	100%	–	–	1–0	–
(Argentina) Juan Mónaco	2004–2015	9	6–3	67%	2–0	4–2	0–1	–
(Latvia) Ernests Gulbis	2009	1	0–1	0%	0–1	–	–	–
(United States) Frances Tiafoe	2017	1	0–1	0%	0–1	–	–	–
(Spain) Pablo Carreño Busta	2017–2018	2	0–2	0%	–	0–2	–	–
Total	2004–2018	216	77–139	36%	34–76	30–42	13–17	0–4

== Wins over top 10 players ==
Season	2004	2005	2006	2007	2008	2009	2010	2011	2012	2013	2014	2015	2016	2017	2018	Total
Wins	1	1	1	1	0	0	2	2	1	1	1	0	1	0	0	12

#	Player	Rank	Event	Surface	Rd	Score	FM Rank
2004
1.	(Argentina) Guillermo Coria	3	Wimbledon, London, Great Britain	Grass	2R	4–6, 6–3, 6–3, 6–4	66
2005
2.	(Argentina) Guillermo Coria	9	Sopot, Poland	Clay	SF	6–4, 5–7, 6–3	95
2006
3.	(Spain) Tommy Robredo	7	Sopot, Poland	Clay	2R	6–2, 6–4	60
2007
4.	(Russia) Nikolay Davydenko	3	Halle, Germany	Grass	2R	6–4, 6–4	37
2010
5.	(Russia) Mikhail Youzhny	8	Shanghai, China	Hard	2R	6–4, 6–7^{(5–7)}, 6–1	48
6.	(Sweden) Robin Söderling	5	Stockholm, Sweden	Hard (i)	QF	7–6^{(10–8)}, 6–1	47
2011
7.	(Austria) Jürgen Melzer	8	Rome, Italy	Clay	2R	6–4, retired	28
8.	(Spain) Rafael Nadal	2	Shanghai, China	Hard	3R	7–6^{(7–5)}, 6–3	23
2012
9.	(United States) John Isner	10	Miami, United States	Hard	3R	6–4, 6–2	19
2013
10.	(Spain) David Ferrer	4	Shanghai, China	Hard	3R	6–4, 6–3	50
2014
11.	(United Kingdom) Andy Murray	4	Doha, Qatar	Hard	2R	3–6, 6–4, 6–2	40
2016
12.	(Austria) Dominic Thiem	7	Halle, Germany	Grass	SF	6–3, 6–4	192

== German tournaments ==
Tournament	2004	2005	2006	2007	2008	2009	2010	2011	2012	2013	2014	2015	2016	2017	2018	SR	W–L
Hamburg	3R	1R	1R	2R	A	2R	SF	QF	QF	QF	A	2R	1R	F	1R	0 / 13	20–13
Halle	1R	2R	QF	QF	A	A	A	QF	2R	QF	A	QF	W	QF	2R	1 / 11	19–10
Stuttgart	2R	1R	QF	1R	A	A	QF	1R	A	2R	A	A	QF	1R	2R	0 / 10	9–10
Munich	A	1R	1R	1R	A	A	A	F	A	QF	A	1R	2R	A	1R	0 / 8	7–8

Awards
Preceded by Rafael Nadal	ATP Newcomer of the Year; 2004	Succeeded by Gaël Monfils
