= 2010 Rijeka Open – Doubles =

Doubles
- 2010 Rijeka Open

Final
- Champions: (Canada) Adil Shamasdin (Croatia) Lovro Zovko
- Runners-up: (Argentina) Carlos Berlocq (Spain) Rubén Ramírez Hidalgo
- Score: 1–6, 7–6(9), [10–5]

Events
Singles	Doubles
← 2009 ·	Rijeka Open	· 2011 →

Sebastián Decoud and Miguel Ángel López Jaén were the defending champions but decided not to participate this year.
Adil Shamasdin and Lovro Zovko defeated Carlos Berlocq and Rubén Ramírez Hidalgo 1–6, 7–6(9), [10–5] in the final.

== Seeds ==
1. (Canada) Adil Shamasdin / (Croatia) Lovro Zovko (champions)
2. (Argentina) Carlos Berlocq / (Spain) Rubén Ramírez Hidalgo (final)
3. (Russia) Ilya Belyaev / (Serbia) David Savić (semifinals)
4. (Ukraine) Denys Molchanov / (Russia) Dmitri Sitak (first round)

== Draw ==
=== Key ===
- Q = Qualifier
- WC = Wild card
- LL = Lucky loser
- Alt = Alternate
- SE = Special exempt
- PR = Protected ranking
- ITF = ITF entry
- JE = Junior exempt
- w/o = Walkover
- r = Retired
- d = Defaulted
- SR = Special ranking

=== Draw ===
First round
1	(Canada) A Shamasdin (Croatia) L Zovko	6	6
(Croatia) F Škugor (Croatia) A Veić	1	2
(Italy) A Brizzi (Argentina) D Junqueira	6	2	[7]
(Slovakia) A Martin (Slovakia) M Mečíř Jr.	4	6	[10]
4	(Ukraine) D Molchanov (Russia) D Sitak	3	4
ALT	(Monaco) B Balleret (France) J Dasnières de Veigy	6	6
WC	(Croatia) I Cerović (Germany) C-M Stebe	4	4
WC	(Croatia) M Draganja (Croatia) D Marcan	6	6
(Hungary) A Balázs (Israel) A Hadad	3	2
(Croatia) N Mektić (Croatia) I Zovko	6	6
(Italy) S Galvani (Italy) M Viola	0	6^{5}
3	(Russia) I Belyaev (Serbia) D Savić	6	7
ALT	(Croatia) T Androić (Croatia) M Milan
(Germany) M Bachinger (Germany) D Kindlmann	w/o
(Croatia) A Pehar (Croatia) M Ružić	2	1
2	(Argentina) C Berlocq (Spain) R Ramírez Hidalgo	6	6

Quarterfinals
1	(Canada) A Shamasdin (Croatia) L Zovko	6	7
(Slovakia) A Martin (Slovakia) M Mečíř Jr.	2	5
ALT	(Monaco) B Balleret (France) J Dasnières de Veigy	2	2
WC	(Croatia) M Draganja (Croatia) D Marcan	6	6
(Croatia) N Mektić (Croatia) I Zovko	6^{2}	2
3	(Russia) I Belyaev (Serbia) D Savić	7	6
ALT	(Croatia) T Androić (Croatia) M Milan	6^{4}	3
2	(Argentina) C Berlocq (Spain) R Ramírez Hidalgo	7	6

Semifinals
1	(Canada) A Shamasdin (Croatia) L Zovko	2	7	[10]
WC	(Croatia) M Draganja (Croatia) D Marcan	6	5	[4]
3	(Russia) I Belyaev (Serbia) D Savić	1	0
2	(Argentina) C Berlocq (Spain) R Ramírez Hidalgo	6	6

Finals
1	(Canada) A Shamasdin (Croatia) L Zovko	1	7	[10]
2	(Argentina) C Berlocq (Spain) R Ramírez Hidalgo	6	6^{9}	[5]
