= 2011 Rijeka Open – Singles =

Singles
- 2011 Rijeka Open

Final
- Champion: (Portugal) Rui Machado
- Runner-up: (Slovenia) Grega Žemlja
- Score: 6–3, 6–0

Events
Singles	Doubles
← 2010 ·	Rijeka Open	· 2012 →

Blaž Kavčič was the defending champion, but he lost to Paolo Lorenzi 6–4, 1–6, 4–6 in the quarterfinals.
Rui Machado won in the final against Grega Žemlja 6–3, 6–0.

== Seeds ==
1. (Slovenia) Blaž Kavčič (quarterfinals)
2. (Argentina) Diego Junqueira (second round)
3. (Portugal) Rui Machado (champion)
4. (France) Éric Prodon (first round)
5. (Italy) Paolo Lorenzi (semifinals)
6. (Argentina) Brian Dabul (first round)
7. (France) Vincent Millot (first round)
8. (Slovenia) Grega Žemlja (final)

== Draw ==
=== Key ===
- Q = Qualifier
- WC = Wild card
- LL = Lucky loser
- Alt = Alternate
- ITF = ITF entry
- PR = Protected ranking
- SR = Special ranking
- SE = Special exempt
- JE = Junior exempt
- JR = Junior Accelerator Programme entrant
- CO = College Accelerator Programme entrant
- NG = Next Gen Accelerator Program entrant
- w/o = Walkover
- r = Retired
- d = Defaulted

=== Finals ===
Semifinals
5	(Italy) Paolo Lorenzi	6	4	4
8	(Slovenia) Grega Žemlja	4	6	6
3	(Portugal) Rui Machado	6	6
(Italy) Simone Vagnozzi	2	2

Final
8	(Slovenia) Grega Žemlja	3	0
3	(Portugal) Rui Machado	6	6

=== Top half ===
First round
1	(Slovenia) B Kavčič	6	7
(Canada) F Dancevic	4	5
Q	(Spain) G Trujillo-Soler	6	6
(France) A Gensse	3	3
(France) O Patience	3	4
Q	(Portugal) P Sousa	6	6
WC	(Croatia) N Mektić	3	4
5	(Italy) P Lorenzi	6	6
4	(France) É Prodon	4	6	5^{r}
WC	(Croatia) K Mesaroš	6	2	6
(Hungary) A Balázs	6	6
(Brazil) J Silva	1	2
(Argentina) F Bagnis	6	4	2
Alt	(Croatia) A Veić	4	6	6
(Italy) A di Mauro	4	0	r
8	(Slovenia) G Žemlja	6	3

Second round
1	(Slovenia) B Kavčič	6	7
Q	(Spain) G Trujillo-Soler	3	5
Q	(Portugal) P Sousa	4	0
5	(Italy) P Lorenzi	6	6
WC	(Croatia) K Mesaroš	6	6
(Hungary) A Balázs	3	1
Alt	(Croatia) A Veić	4	3
8	(Slovenia) G Žemlja	6	6

Quarterfinals
1	(Slovenia) B Kavčič	6	1	4
5	(Italy) P Lorenzi	4	6	6
WC	(Croatia) K Mesaroš	1	5
8	(Slovenia) G Žemlja	6	7

Semifinals
5	(Italy) P Lorenzi	6	4	4
8	(Slovenia) G Žemlja	4	6	6

=== Bottom half ===
First round
6	(Argentina) B Dabul	6^{1}	4
WC	(Croatia) B Puc	7	6
(Romania) A Ungur	6	6
(Italy) M Viola	4	2
(Estonia) J Zopp	2
(Hungary) Á Kellner	0^{r}
WC	(Croatia) D Marcan	2	3
3	(Portugal) R Machado	6	6
7	(France) V Millot	2	4
(Italy) S Vagnozzi	6	6
(France) D Guez	6	6
(Argentina) JP Brzezicki	1	1
Q	(Italy) Andrea Arnaboldi	1	6	6^{4}
(Argentina) A Molteni	6	4	7
Q	(France) N Devilder	1	2
2	(Argentina) D Junqueira	6	6

Second round
WC	(Croatia) B Puc	1	2
(Romania) A Ungur	6	6
(Estonia) J Zopp	4	2
3	(Portugal) R Machado	6	6
(Italy) S Vagnozzi	6	6
(France) D Guez	2	0
(Argentina) A Molteni	6	7
2	(Argentina) D Junqueira	3	5

Quarterfinals
(Romania) A Ungur	6	3	1
3	(Portugal) R Machado	4	6	6
(Italy) S Vagnozzi	4	6	7
(Argentina) A Molteni	6	2	6^{3}

Semifinals
3	(Portugal) R Machado	6	6
(Italy) S Vagnozzi	2	2
