= 2009 Cyclus Open de Tênis =

- Date: 19–25 October
- Edition: 4th
- Location: Florianópolis, Brazil

Champions

Singles
- (France) Guillaume Rufin

Doubles
- (Poland) Tomasz Bednarek / (Poland) Mateusz Kowalczyk
← 2008 ·	Aberto de Florianópolis	· 2012 →

The 2009 Cyclus Open de Tênis was a professional tennis tournament played on outdoor red clay courts. It was the fourth edition of the tournament which was part of the 2009 ATP Challenger Tour. It took place in Florianópolis, Brazil between 19 and 25 October 2009.

== ATP entrants ==
=== Seeds ===
Country	Player	Rank^{1}	Seed
BRA	Marcos Daniel	84	1
ESP	Daniel Gimeno Traver	91	2
SLO	Blaž Kavčič	145	3
BRA	Thiago Alves	149	4
ESP	Pere Riba	150	5
ARG	Diego Junqueira	181	6
ARG	Juan-Martín Aranguren	189	7
ARG	Gastón Gaudio	201	8

- Rankings are as of October 12, 2009.

=== Other entrants ===
The following players received wildcards into the singles main draw:

- (Brazil) Thiago Alves
- (Brazil) Guilherme Clézar
- (Argentina) Gastón Gaudio
- (Brazil) Valter Mori Filho

The following players received entry from the qualifying draw:

- (Germany) Andre Begemann
- (Brazil) André Miele
- (Argentina) Andrés Molteni
- (Croatia) Franko Škugor

== Champions ==
=== Singles ===
(France) Guillaume Rufin def. (Spain) Pere Riba, 6–4, 3–6, 6–3

=== Doubles ===
(Poland) Tomasz Bednarek / (Poland) Mateusz Kowalczyk def. (Spain) Daniel Gimeno Traver / (Spain) Pere Riba, 6–4, 3–6, 6–3
