= 2009 Mamaia Challenger – Doubles =

Doubles
- 2009 Mamaia Challenger

Final
- Champions: (Chile) Adrián García; (Spain) David Marrero
- Runners-up: (Romania) Adrian Cruciat; (Romania) Florin Mergea
- Score: 7–6(5), 6–2

Events
| Singles | Doubles |
| ← 2008 · | Mamaia Challenger | · 2010 → |

Florin Mergea and Horia Tecău were the defending champions. Tecău didn't start this year.
Mergea partnered up with Adrian Cruciat. They reached the final, where they lost to Adrián García and David Marrero.

== Seeds ==
1. (Italy) Marco Crugnola / (Italy) Alessio di Mauro (quarterfinals)
2. (Brazil) Rogério Dutra da Silva / (Brazil) João Souza (first round)
3. (Argentina) Diego Álvarez / (Spain) Carles Poch Gradin (first round)
4. (Latvia) Deniss Pavlovs / (Ukraine) Artem Smirnov (quarterfinals)

== Draw ==
=== Key ===
- Q = Qualifier
- WC = Wild card
- LL = Lucky loser
- Alt = Alternate
- SE = Special exempt
- PR = Protected ranking
- ITF = ITF entry
- JE = Junior exempt
- w/o = Walkover
- r = Retired
- d = Defaulted
- SR = Special ranking

=== Draw ===
First round

Quarterfinals

Semifinals

Finals

1
- (Italy) M Crugnola
- (Italy) A di Mauro
6
7

- (Romania) A-M Constantin
- (Romania) A Mlendea
3
6^{1}

1
- (Italy) M Crugnola
- (Italy) A di Mauro
1
2

WC
- (Romania) T-D Crăciun
- (Romania) P-A Luncanu
6
6^{5}
[10]

WC
- (Romania) T-D Crăciun
- (Romania) P-A Luncanu
6
6

- (Argentina) J-P Amado
- (Spain) F Vicente
4
7
[7]

WC
- (Romania) T-D Crăciun
- (Romania) P-A Luncanu
6^{3}
7
[6]

4
- (Latvia) D Pavlovs
- (Ukraine) A Smirnov
6
6

- (Romania) A Cruciat
- (Romania) F Mergea
7
5
[10]

WC
(Romania) B Andrii
(Romania) A-M Dăncescu
1
2

4
- (Latvia) D Pavlovs
- (Ukraine) A Smirnov
4
2

- (Chile) H Podlipnik Castillo
- (Spain) P Santos
2
1

- (Romania) A Cruciat
- (Romania) F Mergea
6
6

- (Romania) A Cruciat
- (Romania) F Mergea
6
6

- (Romania) A Cruciat
- (Romania) F Mergea
6^{5}
2

- (Austria) A Haider-Maurer
- (Germany) D Kindlmann
6
2
[8]

- (Chile) A García
- (Spain) D Marrero
7
6

- (Italy) G Petrazzuolo
- (Romania) A Ungur
4
6
[10]

- (Italy) G Petrazzuolo
- (Romania) A Ungur
6
2
[10]

- (Romania) V Ioniță
- (Romania) G Moraru
2
6
[10]

- (Romania) V Ioniță
- (Romania) G Moraru
1
6
[6]

3
- (Argentina) D Álvarez
- (Spain) C Poch-Gradin
6
4
[8]

- (Italy) G Petrazzuolo
- (Romania) A Ungur
6^{4}
4

(Slovakia) K Čapkovič
(France) O Charroin
5
2

- (Chile) A García
- (Spain) D Marrero
7
6

- (Slovenia) B Kavčič
- (Czech Republic) J Pospíšil
7
6

- (Slovenia) B Kavčič
- (Czech Republic) J Pospíšil
4
3

- (Chile) A García
- (Spain) D Marrero
4
6
[10]

- (Chile) A García
- (Spain) D Marrero
6
6

2
- (Brazil) R Dutra da Silva
- (Brazil) J Souza
6
4
[6]
