= 2012 Aberto de Florianópolis – Doubles =

Doubles
- 2012 Aberto de Florianópolis

Final
- Champions: (Slovenia) Blaž Kavčič (Croatia) Antonio Veić
- Runners-up: (Spain) Javier Martí (Portugal) Leonardo Tavares
- Score: 6–3, 6–3

Events
Singles	Doubles
← 2011 ·	Aberto de Florianópolis	· 2013 →

Tomasz Bednarek and Mateusz Kowalczyk were the defending champions but decided not to participate.
Blaž Kavčič and Antonio Veić won the title after defeating Javier Martí and Leonardo Tavares 6–3, 6–3 in the final.

== Seeds ==
1. (Brazil) Ricardo Mello / (Brazil) Júlio Silva (semifinals)
2. (Brazil) Christian Lindell / (Brazil) André Miele (quarterfinals)
3. (Brazil) Ricardo Hocevar / (Brazil) Fernando Romboli (first round)
4. (Serbia) Nikola Ćirić / (Montenegro) Goran Tošić (first round)

== Draw ==
=== Key ===
- Q = Qualifier
- WC = Wild card
- LL = Lucky loser
- Alt = Alternate
- SE = Special exempt
- PR = Protected ranking
- ITF = ITF entry
- JE = Junior exempt
- w/o = Walkover
- r = Retired
- d = Defaulted
- SR = Special ranking

=== Draw ===
First round
1	(Brazil) R Mello (Brazil) J Silva	6	6
WC	(Brazil) A Laranja (Brazil) N Santos	1	0
(Peru) D Beretta (Brazil) G Clezar	0	1
(Argentina) D Junqueira (France) É Prodon	6	6
4	(Serbia) N Ćirić (Montenegro) G Tošić	2	7^{7}	[5]
(Slovenia) B Kavčič (Croatia) A Veić	6	6^{5}	[10]
(United States) A Collarini (United States) W Odesnik	0	6	[10]
(Brazil) T Alves (Brazil) F de Paula	6	3	[8]
(Argentina) JP Brzezicki (Uruguay) M Cuevas	6	6
(Argentina) F Argüello (Argentina) P Galdón	4	4
(Brazil) M Demoliner (Brazil) A Ghem	6	6
3	(Brazil) R Hocevar (Brazil) F Romboli	2	1
(Spain) J Martí (Portugal) L Tavares	6	6
WC	(Brazil) T Fernandes (Brazil) T Monteiro	1	2
WC	(Brazil) B Sant'anna (Brazil) JP Sorgi	1	7^{7}	[7]
2	(Brazil) C Lindell (Brazil) A Miele	6	6^{4}	[10]

Quarterfinals
1	(Brazil) R Mello (Brazil) J Silva	6	6
(Argentina) D Junqueira (France) É Prodon	4	2
(Slovenia) B Kavčič (Croatia) A Veić	6	3	[10]
(United States) A Collarini (United States) W Odesnik	3	6	[7]
(Argentina) JP Brzezicki (Uruguay) M Cuevas	6	6
(Brazil) M Demoliner (Brazil) A Ghem	2	1
(Spain) J Martí (Portugal) L Tavares	6	6
2	(Brazil) C Lindell (Brazil) A Miele	2	1

Semifinals
1	(Brazil) R Mello (Brazil) J Silva	w/o
(Slovenia) B Kavčič (Croatia) A Veić
(Argentina) JP Brzezicki (Uruguay) M Cuevas	4	4
(Spain) J Martí (Portugal) L Tavares	6	6

Final
(Slovenia) B Kavčič (Croatia) A Veić	6	6
(Spain) J Martí (Portugal) L Tavares	3	3
