= 2011 Rijeka Open – Doubles =

Doubles
- 2011 Rijeka Open

Final
- Champions: (Italy) Paolo Lorenzi (Brazil) Júlio Silva
- Runners-up: (Croatia) Lovro Zovko (Croatia) Dino Marcan
- Score: 6–3, 6–2

Events
| Singles | Doubles |
| ← 2010 · | Rijeka Open | · 2012 → |

Adil Shamasdin and Lovro Zovko were the defending champions, but Shamasdin decided not to participate.
Zovko played alongside Dino Marcan. They reached the final, but Paolo Lorenzi and Júlio Silva defeated them 6–3, 6–2.

== Seeds ==
1. (Italy) Alessio di Mauro / (Italy) Simone Vagnozzi (quarterfinals)
2. (Australia) Jordan Kerr / (United States) Travis Parrott (semifinals)
3. (Croatia) Lovro Zovko / (Croatia) Dino Marcan (final)
4. (Italy) Paolo Lorenzi / (Brazil) Júlio Silva (champions)

== Draw ==
=== Key ===
- Q = Qualifier
- WC = Wild card
- LL = Lucky loser
- Alt = Alternate
- SE = Special exempt
- PR = Protected ranking
- ITF = ITF entry
- JE = Junior exempt
- w/o = Walkover
- r = Retired
- d = Defaulted
- SR = Special ranking

=== Draw ===
First round
1 | (Italy) A di Mauro (Italy) S Vagnozzi | 2 | 6 | [10]
(New Zealand) J Statham (Estonia) J Zopp | 6 | 4 | [6]
(France) J Eysseric (France) A Gensse | 5 | 3
WC | (Croatia) B Puc (Croatia) Marcel Ružić | 7 | 6
4 | (Italy) P Lorenzi (Brazil) J Silva | 6 | 6
Alt | (Italy) Enrico Becuzzi (Romania) A Ungur | 2 | 2
(Slovenia) B Kavčič (Slovenia) G Žemlja | 6 | 6
WC | (Croatia) Filip Kraljević (Croatia) Luka Žunić | 3 | 4
(Argentina) F Bagnis (Brazil) F Romboli | 6 | 6
WC | (Croatia) Davor Pilepić (Croatia) Marin Rosović | 1 | 1
(Croatia) M Hižak (Croatia) N Mektić | 2 | 4
3 | (Croatia) L Zovko (Croatia) D Marcan | 6 | 6
(Australia) Allen Perel (Spain) G Trujillo-Soler | 4 | 1
(Argentina) D Junqueira (Argentina) A Molteni | 6 | 6
(Portugal) R Machado (Portugal) P Sousa | 4 | 7 | [8]
2 | (Australia) J Kerr (United States) T Parrott | 6 | 6^{4} | [10]

Quarterfinals
1 | (Italy) A di Mauro (Italy) S Vagnozzi
WC | (Croatia) B Puc (Croatia) Marcel Ružić | w/o
4 | (Italy) P Lorenzi (Brazil) J Silva | 6 | 6
(Slovenia) B Kavčič (Slovenia) G Žemlja | 3 | 4
(Argentina) F Bagnis (Brazil) F Romboli | 6 | 1 | [7]
3 | (Croatia) L Zovko (Croatia) D Marcan | 3 | 6 | [10]
(Argentina) D Junqueira (Argentina) A Molteni | 2 | 3
2 | (Australia) J Kerr (United States) T Parrott | 6 | 6

Semifinals
WC | (Croatia) B Puc (Croatia) Marcel Ružić | 2 | 2
4 | (Italy) P Lorenzi (Brazil) J Silva | 6 | 6
3 | (Croatia) L Zovko (Croatia) D Marcan | 7 | 7
2 | (Australia) J Kerr (United States) T Parrott | 6^{5} | 6^{5}

Final
4 | (Italy) P Lorenzi (Brazil) J Silva | 6 | 6
3 | (Croatia) L Zovko (Croatia) D Marcan | 3 | 2
