= 2009 Rijeka Open – Singles =

Singles
- 2009 Rijeka Open

Final
- Champion: (Italy) Paolo Lorenzi
- Runner-up: (Slovenia) Blaž Kavčič
- Score: 6–3, 7–6(2)

Events
Singles	Doubles
← 2008 ·	Rijeka Open	· 2010 →

Nicolás Massú was the defending champion.
Paolo Lorenzi won in the final 6–3, 7–6(2), against Blaž Kavčič.

== Seeds ==
1. (Spain) Iván Navarro (second round)
2. (France) Mathieu Montcourt (semifinals)
3. (Croatia) Roko Karanušić (second round)
4. (Spain) Rubén Ramírez Hidalgo (first round)
5. (Australia) Peter Luczak (second round)
6. (Spain) Daniel Muñoz-de la Nava (first round)
7. (Argentina) Sebastián Decoud (first round)
8. (Switzerland) Stéphane Bohli (quarterfinals)

== Draw ==
=== Key ===
- Q = Qualifier
- WC = Wild card
- LL = Lucky loser
- Alt = Alternate
- SE = Special exempt
- PR = Protected ranking
- ITF = ITF entry
- JE = Junior exempt
- w/o = Walkover
- r = Retired
- d = Defaulted
- SR = Special ranking

=== Final four ===
Semifinals
(Italy) Paolo Lorenzi	6	6
(Czech Republic) Jan Hájek	4	1
(Slovenia) Blaž Kavčič	6	6
2	(France) Mathieu Montcourt	3	3

Final
(Italy) Paolo Lorenzi	6	7
(Slovenia) Blaž Kavčič	3	6^{2}

=== Top half ===
First round
1	(Spain) I Navarro	4	6	7
Q	(Serbia) N Ćirić	6	4	6^{7}
(Italy) P Lorenzi	6	6
WC	(Croatia) A Sančić	4	1
LL	(Chile) A García	6	6
WC	(Croatia) M Ružić	2	2
(Switzerland) M Lammer	6	1	6
7	(Argentina) S Decoud	3	6	3
3	(Croatia) R Karanušić	6	6
WC	(Croatia) I Cerović	4	3
(Argentina) J-P Amado	2	0
(Czech Republic) J Hájek	6	6
Q	(Slovakia) P Červenák	2	6	6
WC	(Croatia) F Škugor	6	4	2
(Australia) M Matosevic	3	4
8	(Switzerland) S Bohli	6	6

Second round
1	(Spain) I Navarro	4	6	6^{1}
(Italy) P Lorenzi	6	2	7
LL	(Chile) A García	3	4
(Switzerland) M Lammer	6	6
3	(Croatia) R Karanušić	6^{7}	2
(Czech Republic) J Hájek	7	6
Q	(Slovakia) P Červenák	3	3
8	(Switzerland) S Bohli	6	6

Quarterfinals
(Italy) P Lorenzi	6	7
(Switzerland) M Lammer	4	5
(Czech Republic) J Hájek	3	6	6
8	(Switzerland) S Bohli	6	3	2

Semifinals
(Italy) P Lorenzi	6	6
(Czech Republic) J Hájek	4	1

=== Bottom half ===
First round
6	(Spain) D Muñoz-de la Nava	4	7	2
(Slovenia) B Kavčič	6	5	6
(Germany) A Flock	5	6	2
(Croatia) I Dodig	7	3	6
(France) S Robert	6	5	7
Q	(Croatia) N Mektić	1	7	6^{1}
(Slovenia) G Žemlja	7	3	6
4	(Spain) R Ramírez Hidalgo	6^{7}	6	3
5	(Australia) P Luczak	6	6
(Serbia) B Pašanski	4	4
(Spain) D Marrero	7	4	1
Q	(Italy) S Vagnozzi	6^{3}	6	6
(Croatia) A Veić	6	6^{4}	4
(Spain) MÁ López Jaén	4	7	6
(Belgium) N Desein	2	2
2	(France) M Montcourt	6	6

Second round
(Slovenia) B Kavčič	6	6
(Croatia) I Dodig	4	4
(France) S Robert	5	6	7
(Slovenia) G Žemlja	7	4	5
5	(Australia) P Luczak	6	6^{6}	2
Q	(Italy) S Vagnozzi	3	7	6
(Spain) MÁ López Jaén	2	1
2	(France) M Montcourt	6	6

Quarterfinals
(Slovenia) B Kavčič	7	6
(France) S Robert	6^{2}	2
Q	(Italy) S Vagnozzi	6	6^{5}	3
2	(France) M Montcourt	4	7	6

Semifinals
(Slovenia) B Kavčič	6	6
2	(France) M Montcourt	3	3
