= 2009 Cyclus Open de Tênis – Singles =

Singles
- 2009 Cyclus Open de Tênis

Final
- Champion: (France) Guillaume Rufin
- Runner-up: (Spain) Pere Riba
- Score: 6–4, 3–6, 6–3

Events
Singles	Doubles
- Cyclus Open de Tênis

Nicolás Massú was the defending champion, but he chose to not compete this year.
Guillaume Rufin won this tournament, after beating Pere Riba 6–4, 3–6, 6–3 in the final.

== Seeds ==
1. (Brazil) Marcos Daniel (first round)
2. (Spain) Daniel Gimeno-Traver (second round)
3. (Slovenia) Blaž Kavčič (quarterfinals)
4. (Brazil) Thiago Alves (first round)
5. (Spain) Pere Riba (final)
6. (Argentina) Diego Junqueira (quarterfinals)
7. (Argentina) Juan-Martín Aranguren (second round)
8. (Argentina) Gastón Gaudio (semifinals)

== Draw ==
Key

- Q = Qualifier
- WC = Wild card
- LL = Lucky loser
- Alt = Alternate
- ITF = ITF entry
- PR = Protected ranking
- SR = Special ranking
- SE = Special exempt
- JE = Junior exempt
- JR = Junior Accelerator Programme entrant
- CO = College Accelerator Programme entrant
- NG = Next Gen Accelerator Program entrant
- w/o = Walkover
- r = Retired
- d = Defaulted

=== Finals ===
Semifinals
(France) Guillaume Rufin	6	6
Q	(Germany) Andre Begemann	3	1
8	(Argentina) Gastón Gaudio	3	2
5	(Spain) Pere Riba	6	6

Final
(France) Guillaume Rufin	6	3	7
5	(Spain) Pere Riba	4	6	5

=== Top half ===
First round
1	(Brazil) M Daniel	4	4
(France) G Rufin	6	6
(Argentina) M Alund	6	7
Q	(Argentina) A Molteni	2	5
Q	(Brazil) A Miele	1	1
(Brazil) R Dutra da Silva	6	6
(Brazil) E Gomes	6	2	0
6	(Argentina) D Junqueira	4	6	6
3	(Slovenia) B Kavčič	7	6
(Brazil) M Demoliner	5	1
(Spain) C Poch-Gradin	6	6
(Brazil) C Zampieri	4	4
(Argentina) F Bagnis	4	4
Q	(Germany) A Begemann	6	6
(Spain) G Olaso	2	6^{3}
7	(Argentina) J-M Aranguren	6	7

Second round
(France) G Rufin	6	6
(Argentina) M Alund	2	3
(Brazil) R Dutra da Silva	5	3
6	(Argentina) D Junqueira	7	6
3	(Slovenia) B Kavčič	3	7	6
(Spain) C Poch-Gradin	6	5	3
Q	(Germany) A Begemann	6	6
7	(Argentina) J-M Aranguren	3	2

Quarterfinals
(France) G Rufin	6	6
6	(Argentina) D Junqueira	2	4
3	(Slovenia) B Kavčič	6	5	1
Q	(Germany) A Begemann	2	7	6

Semifinals
(France) G Rufin	6	6
Q	(Germany) A Begemann	3	1

=== Bottom half ===
First round
8	(Argentina) G Gaudio	6	2	6
Q	(Croatia) F Škugor	3	6	2
(Brazil) F Ferreiro	3	1	r
(Brazil) L Kirche	6	2
(France) J Dasnières de Veigy	6	6
WC	(Brazil) G Clézar	3	3
(Germany) L Pörschke	3	7	6
4	(Brazil) T Alves	6	6^{5}	4
5	(Spain) P Riba	7	6
(Monaco) B Balleret	6^{6}	0
(Argentina) G Pella	6	6
ALT	(Argentina) G Sola	3	1
(Spain) I Cervantes-Huegun	7	6
(Brazil) T Lopes	6^{5}	1
(Portugal) L Tavares	6	3	r
2	(Spain) D Gimeno-Traver	4	4

Second round
8	(Argentina) G Gaudio	7	6
(Brazil) L Kirche	5	1
(France) J Dasnières de Veigy	6	7
(Germany) L Pörschke	3	5
5	(Spain) P Riba	4	7	7
(Argentina) G Pella	6	5	5
(Spain) I Cervantes-Huegun	3	7	6
2	(Spain) D Gimeno-Traver	6	6^{8}	1

Quarterfinals
8	(Argentina) G Gaudio	6	2	6
(France) J Dasnières de Veigy	3	6	0
5	(Spain) P Riba	6	7
(Spain) I Cervantes-Huegun	3	6^{8}

Semifinals
8	(Argentina) G Gaudio	2	3
5	(Spain) P Riba	6	6
