= 2010 Rijeka Open – Singles =

Singles
- 2010 Rijeka Open

Final
- Champion: (Slovenia) Blaž Kavčič
- Runner-up: (Spain) Rubén Ramírez Hidalgo
- Score: 6–4, 3–6, 7–6(5)

Events
Singles	Doubles
← 2009 ·	Rijeka Open	· 2011 →

Paolo Lorenzi unsuccessfully defended his title, and was eliminated by Antonio Veić in the first round.

Blaž Kavčič won the tournament, defeating Rubén Ramírez Hidalgo 6–4, 3–6, 7–6(5) in the final.

== Seeds ==
1. (Spain) Rubén Ramírez Hidalgo (final)
2. (Argentina) Carlos Berlocq (semifinals)
3. (Italy) Paolo Lorenzi (first round)
4. (Slovenia) Grega Žemlja (semifinals)
5. (Slovenia) Blaž Kavčič (champion)
6. (Austria) Daniel Köllerer (first round)
7. (Germany) Dieter Kindlmann (second round)
8. (Croatia) Franko Škugor (second round)

== Draw ==
=== Key ===
- Q = Qualifier
- WC = Wild card
- LL = Lucky loser
- Alt = Alternate
- SE = Special exempt
- PR = Protected ranking
- ITF = ITF entry
- JE = Junior exempt
- w/o = Walkover
- r = Retired
- d = Defaulted
- SR = Special ranking

=== Finals ===
Semifinals
1	(Spain) Rubén Ramírez Hidalgo	6	6
4	(Slovenia) Grega Žemlja	2	2
5	(Slovenia) Blaž Kavčič	4	6	7
2	(Argentina) Carlos Berlocq	6	2	6^{6}

Final
1	(Spain) Rubén Ramírez Hidalgo	4	6	6^{5}
5	(Slovenia) Blaž Kavčič	6	3	7

=== Top half ===
First round
1	(Spain) R Ramírez Hidalgo	6	6
(Slovakia) M Semjan	2	2
(Croatia) N Mektić	7	7
Q	(Czech Republic) M Konečný	6^{2}	5
(Slovakia) A Martin	6	6
WC	(Croatia) D Marcan	3	2
(Sweden) F Prpic	7	6
6	(Austria) D Köllerer	5	2
4	(Slovenia) G Žemlja	6	6
(Italy) S Galvani	3	2
WC	(Austria) T Muster	4	6	3
Q	(Bosnia and Herzegovina) A Šetkić	6	2	6
(Hungary) A Balázs	6	6
WC	(Croatia) M Ružić	1	1
WC	(Croatia) I Cerović	4	4
7	(Germany) D Kindlmann	6	6

Second round
1	(Spain) R Ramírez Hidalgo	7	6
(Croatia) N Mektić	6^{2}	4
(Slovakia) A Martin	6	6
(Sweden) F Prpic	2	3
4	(Slovenia) G Žemlja	6	6
Q	(Bosnia and Herzegovina) A Šetkić	3	1
(Hungary) A Balázs	6	7
7	(Germany) D Kindlmann	4	5

Quarterfinals
1	(Spain) R Ramírez Hidalgo	6	2	6
(Slovakia) A Martin	2	6	3
4	(Slovenia) G Žemlja	6	6
(Hungary) A Balázs	1	1

Semifinals
1	(Spain) R Ramírez Hidalgo	6	6
4	(Slovenia) G Žemlja	2	2

=== Bottom half ===
First round
5	(Slovenia) B Kavčič	4	6	6
(Argentina) D Junqueira	6	3	2
Q	(Serbia) M Djokovic	6	3
(Czech Republic) I Minář	7	6
(Monaco) B Balleret	2	1
(Germany) M Bachinger	6	6
(Croatia) A Veić	6	6
3	(Italy) P Lorenzi	4	4
8	(Croatia) F Škugor	6	7
(Italy) S Vagnozzi	4	5
Q	(Bosnia and Herzegovina) M Bašić	6	5	1
(Italy) A Brizzi	3	7	6
(France) J Dasnières de Veigy	6	6
(Slovakia) M Mečíř Jr.	2	1
(Italy) M Viola	3	6	3
2	(Argentina) C Berlocq	6	2	6

Second round
5	(Slovenia) B Kavčič	6	6
(Czech Republic) I Minář	3	4
(Germany) M Bachinger	6	6
(Croatia) A Veić	3	2
8	(Croatia) F Škugor	4	6^{3}
(Italy) A Brizzi	6	7
(France) J Dasnières de Veigy	3	3
2	(Argentina) C Berlocq	6	6

Quarterfinals
5	(Slovenia) B Kavčič	6	6
(Germany) M Bachinger	2	2
(Italy) A Brizzi	1	4
2	(Argentina) C Berlocq	6	6

Semifinals
5	(Slovenia) B Kavčič	4	6	7
2	(Argentina) C Berlocq	6	2	6^{6}
