= 2009 Rijeka Open – Doubles =

Doubles
- 2009 Rijeka Open

Final
- Champions: (Argentina) Sebastián Decoud (Spain) Miguel Ángel López Jaén
- Runners-up: (Croatia) Ivan Dodig (Croatia) Antonio Veić
- Score: 6–4, 6–4

Events
Singles	Doubles
- Rijeka Open

Dušan Karol and Jaroslav Pospíšil were the defending champions, but Pospíšil didn't start this year.
Karol partnered up with Olivier Charroin, but they lost in the semifinal with Decoud and López Jaén.
Sebastián Decoud and Miguel Ángel López Jaén defeated Ivan Dodig and Antonio Veić in the final 6–4, 6–4.

== Seeds ==
1. (Spain) David Marrero / (Spain) Rubén Ramírez Hidalgo (first round)
2. (France) Olivier Charroin / (Czech Republic) Dušan Karol (semifinals)
3. (Australia) Peter Luczak / (Brazil) Márcio Torres (first round)
4. (Italy) Paolo Lorenzi / (Italy) Simone Vagnozzi (quarterfinals)

== Draw ==
Key

- Q = Qualifier
- WC = Wild card
- LL = Lucky loser
- Alt = Alternate
- ITF = ITF entry
- PR = Protected ranking
- SR = Special ranking
- SE = Special exempt
- JE = Junior exempt
- JR = Junior Accelerator Programme entrant
- CO = College Accelerator Programme entrant
- NG = Next Gen Accelerator Program entrant
- w/o = Walkover
- r = Retired
- d = Defaulted

=== Draw ===
First round
1	(Spain) D Marrero (Spain) R Ramírez Hidalgo	1	3
(Croatia) I Dodig (Croatia) A Veić	6	6
(Switzerland) S Bohli (France) M Montcourt	6	4	[5]
(Argentina) J-P Amado (Belgium) N Desein	0	6	[10]
3	(Australia) P Luczak (Brazil) M Torres	4	3
(Israel) A Hadad (France) S Robert	6	6
(Germany) A Flock (Austria) M Raditschnigg	6
(Slovakia) P Červenák (Ukraine) D Molchanov	4	r
(Argentina) S Decoud (Spain) MÁ López Jaén	6	6
(Croatia) R Karanušić (Serbia) V Obradović	2	3
ALT	(Serbia) N Ćirić (Serbia) D Savić	6^{4}	7	[4]
4	(Italy) P Lorenzi (Italy) S Vagnozzi	7	6^{2}	[10]
WC	(Croatia) I Cerović (North Macedonia) L Magdincev	6	5	[10]
WC	(Croatia) N Mektić (Croatia) I Zovko	3	7	[3]
WC	(Croatia) T Prpić (Croatia) M Ružić	3	0
2	(France) O Charroin (Czech Republic) D Karol	6	6

Quarterfinals
(Croatia) I Dodig (Croatia) A Veić	6	4	[10]
(Argentina) J-P Amado (Belgium) N Desein	4	6	[8]
(Israel) A Hadad (France) S Robert	4	5
(Germany) A Flock (Austria) M Raditschnigg	6	7
(Argentina) S Decoud (Spain) MÁ López Jaén	6	6
4	(Italy) P Lorenzi (Italy) S Vagnozzi	0	3
(Croatia) I Cerović (North Macedonia) L Magdincev	7	1	[7]
2	(France) O Charroin (Czech Republic) D Karol	6^{6}	6	[10]

Semifinals
(Croatia) I Dodig (Croatia) A Veić	6	6
(Germany) A Flock (Austria) M Raditschnigg	1	3
(Argentina) S Decoud (Spain) MÁ López Jaén	6	6
2	(France) O Charroin (Czech Republic) D Karol	3	4

Finals
(Croatia) I Dodig (Croatia) A Veić	6^{7}	6	[8]
(Argentina) S Decoud (Spain) MÁ López Jaén	7	3	[10]
