= 2010 Rijeka Open =

- Date: September 6 – 12
- Edition: 4th
- Location: Rijeka, Croatia

Champions

Singles
- (Slovenia) Blaž Kavčič

Doubles
- (Canada) Adil Shamasdin / (Croatia) Lovro Zovko
← 2009 ·	Rijeka Open	· 2011 →

The 2010 Rijeka Open was a professional tennis tournament played on outdoor red clay courts. It was the fourth edition of the tournament which was part of the 2010 ATP Challenger Tour. It took place in Rijeka, Croatia between 6 and 12 September 2010 because we are not in September 2015.

== ATP entrants ==
=== Seeds ===
Nationality	Player	Ranking*	Seeding
ESP	Rubén Ramírez Hidalgo	92	1
ARG	Carlos Berlocq	101	2
ITA	Paolo Lorenzi	103	3
SLO	Grega Žemlja	119	4
SLO	Blaž Kavčič	132	5
AUT	Daniel Köllerer	156	6
GER	Dieter Kindlmann	161	7
CRO	Franko Škugor	174	8

- Rankings are as of August 30, 2010.

=== Other entrants ===
The following players received wildcards into the singles main draw:

- (Croatia) Ivan Cerović
- (Croatia) Dino Marcan
- (Austria) Thomas Muster
- (Croatia) Marcel Ružić

The following players received entry from the qualifying draw:

- (Bosnia and Herzegovina) Mirza Bašić
- (Serbia) Marko Djokovic
- (Czech Republic) Michal Konečný
- (Bosnia and Herzegovina) Aldin Šetkić

== Champions ==
=== Singles ===
(Slovenia) Blaž Kavčič def. (Spain) Rubén Ramírez Hidalgo, 6–4, 3–6, 7–6(5)

=== Doubles ===
(Canada) Adil Shamasdin / (Croatia) Lovro Zovko def. (Argentina) Carlos Berlocq / (Spain) Rubén Ramírez Hidalgo, 1–6, 7–6(9), [10–5]
