= 2017 Bangkok Challenger =

- Date: 2–8 January
- Edition: 9th
- Surface: Hard
- Location: Bangkok, Thailand

Champions

Singles
- (Serbia) Janko Tipsarević

Doubles
- (France) Grégoire Barrère / (France) Jonathan Eysseric
← 2016 ·	Bangkok Challenger	· 2018 →

The 2017 Bangkok Challenger was a professional tennis tournament played on hard courts. It was the ninth edition of the tournament and was part of the 2017 ATP Challenger Tour. It took place in Bangkok, Thailand between 2 and 8 January 2017.

== Singles main-draw entrants ==
=== Seeds ===
Country	Player	Rank^{1}	Seed
JPN	Yūichi Sugita	112	1
UZB	Denis Istomin	121	2
ROU	Marius Copil	132	3
SUI	Henri Laaksonen	136	4
SRB	Janko Tipsarević	144	5
CHN	Wu Di	159	6
GER	Maximilian Marterer	176	7
BEL	Yannik Reuter	206	8

- ^{1} Rankings are as of December 26, 2016.

=== Other entrants ===
The following players received wildcards into the singles main draw:

- (Thailand) Congsup Congcar
- (Thailand) Chayanon Kaewsuto
- (Thailand) Patcharapol Kawin
- (Thailand) Warit Sornbutnark

The following player received entry into the singles main draw with a protected ranking:

- (Germany) Cedrik-Marcel Stebe

The following players received entry from the qualifying draw:

- (United Kingdom) Lloyd Glasspool
- (South Korea) Soon-woo Kwon
- (Germany) Nils Langer
- (Estonia) Jürgen Zopp

== Champions ==
=== Singles ===
- (Serbia) Janko Tipsarević def. (Slovenia) Blaž Kavčič 6–3, 7–6^{(7–1)}.

=== Doubles ===
- (France) Grégoire Barrère / (France) Jonathan Eysseric def. (Japan) Yūichi Sugita / (China) Wu Di 6–3, 6–2.
