= 2009 Cyclus Open de Tênis – Doubles =

Doubles
- 2009 Cyclus Open de Tênis

Final
- Champions: (Poland) Tomasz Bednarek (Poland) Mateusz Kowalczyk
- Runners-up: (Spain) Daniel Gimeno-Traver (Spain) Pere Riba
- Score: 6–1, 6–4

Events
Singles	Doubles
- Cyclus Open de Tênis

Rogério Dutra da Silva and Júlio Silva were the defending champions, but only Dutra da Silva competed this year.
He partnered with André Baran, but they lost to Tomasz Bednarek and Mateusz Kowalczyk in the semifinals.
Polish pair won this tournament, after defeating Daniel Gimeno-Traver and Pere Riba 6–1, 6–4 in the final match.

== Seeds ==
1. (Poland) Tomasz Bednarek / (Poland) Mateusz Kowalczyk (champions)
2. (Spain) Daniel Gimeno-Traver / (Spain) Pere Riba (final)
3. (Brazil) Marcos Daniel / (Brazil) Franco Ferreiro (quarterfinals, withdrew)
4. (Brazil) Thiago Alves / (Brazil) Marcelo Demoliner (first round)

== Draw ==
Key

- Q = Qualifier
- WC = Wild card
- LL = Lucky loser
- Alt = Alternate
- ITF = ITF entry
- PR = Protected ranking
- SR = Special ranking
- SE = Special exempt
- JE = Junior exempt
- JR = Junior Accelerator Programme entrant
- CO = College Accelerator Programme entrant
- NG = Next Gen Accelerator Program entrant
- w/o = Walkover
- r = Retired
- d = Defaulted

=== Draw ===
First round
1	(Poland) T Bednarek (Poland) M Kowalczyk	6	6
WC	(Brazil) D Schmitt (Canada) A Sola	4	1
(Argentina) M Alund (Argentina) F Bagnis	7	6
(Argentina) A Molteni (Argentina) G Pella	5	2
3	(Brazil) M Daniel (Brazil) F Ferreiro	6	6
(Brazil) E Gomes (Brazil) T Lopes	3	1
WC	(Brazil) A Baran (Brazil) R Dutra da Silva	6	6
WC	(Brazil) G Clézar (Brazil) T Turini	4	4
(Spain) C Poch-Gradin (Argentina) G Tur	3	6	[10]
(Spain) I Cervantes-Huegun (Spain) G Olaso	6	3	[5]
(Germany) A Begemann (Portugal) L Tavares	4	6	[10]
4	(Brazil) T Alves (Brazil) M Demoliner	6	4	[7]
(Germany) L Pörschke (Brazil) C Zampieri	7	7
(Monaco) B Balleret (France) J Dasnières de Veigy	6^{5}	6^{5}
(Brazil) L Kirche (Brazil) A Miele	3	2
2	(Spain) D Gimeno-Traver (Spain) P Riba	6	6

Quarterfinals
1	(Poland) T Bednarek (Poland) M Kowalczyk	6	6
(Argentina) M Alund (Argentina) F Bagnis	4	3
3	(Brazil) M Daniel (Brazil) F Ferreiro	w/o
WC	(Brazil) A Baran (Brazil) R Dutra da Silva
(Spain) C Poch-Gradin (Argentina) G Tur	1	1
(Germany) A Begemann (Portugal) L Tavares	6	6
(Germany) L Pörschke (Brazil) C Zampieri	3	1
2	(Spain) D Gimeno-Traver (Spain) P Riba	6	6

Semifinals
1	(Poland) T Bednarek (Poland) M Kowalczyk	6	6
WC	(Brazil) A Baran (Brazil) R Dutra da Silva	2	3
(Germany) A Begemann (Portugal) L Tavares	1	1
2	(Spain) D Gimeno-Traver (Spain) P Riba	6	6

Finals
1	(Poland) T Bednarek (Poland) M Kowalczyk	6	6
2	(Spain) D Gimeno-Traver (Spain) P Riba	1	4
