= 2011 Rijeka Open =

Tennis tournament

- Date: 30 May – 5 June
- Edition: 5th
- Location: Rijeka, Croatia

Champions

Singles
- (Portugal) Rui Machado

Doubles
- (Italy) Paolo Lorenzi / (Brazil) Júlio Silva
← 2010 ·	Rijeka Open	· 2012 →

The 2011 Rijeka Open (also known as the 2011 Rijeka Open powered by INA for sponsorship purposes) was a professional tennis tournament played on clay courts. It was the fifth edition of the tournament which was part of the 2011 ATP Challenger Tour. It took place in Rijeka, Croatia between 30 May and 5 June 2011.

== Singles main draw entrants ==
=== Seeds ===
Country	Player	Rank^{1}	Seed
SVN	Blaž Kavčič	82	1
ARG	Diego Junqueira	104	2
POR	Rui Machado	110	3
FRA	Éric Prodon	124	4
ITA	Paolo Lorenzi	128	5
ARG	Brian Dabul	147	6
FRA	Vincent Millot	152	7
SVN	Grega Žemlja	154	8

- Rankings are as of May 23, 2011.

=== Other entrants ===
The following players received wildcards into the singles main draw:

- (Croatia) Dino Marcan
- (Croatia) Nikola Mektić
- (Croatia) Kristijan Mesaroš
- (Croatia) Borut Puc

The following players received entry as an alternate into the singles main draw:

- (Croatia) Antonio Veić

The following players received entry from the qualifying draw:

- (Italy) Andrea Arnaboldi
- (France) Nicolas Devilder
- (Portugal) Pedro Sousa
- (Spain) Gabriel Trujillo Soler

== Champions ==
=== Singles ===
(Portugal) Rui Machado def. (Slovenia) Grega Žemlja, 6–3, 6–0

=== Doubles ===
(Italy) Paolo Lorenzi / (Brazil) Júlio Silva def. (Croatia) Lovro Zovko / (Croatia) Dino Marcan, 6–3, 6–2
