= 2012 Aberto de Florianópolis – Singles =

Singles
- 2012 Aberto de Florianópolis

Final
- Champion: (Italy) Simone Bolelli
- Runner-up: (Slovenia) Blaž Kavčič
- Score: 6–3, 6–4

Events
Singles	Doubles
← 2011 ·	Aberto de Florianópolis	· 2013 →

Guillaume Rufin was the defending champion but decided not to participate.
Simone Bolelli won the title, defeating Blaž Kavčič 6–3, 6–4 in the final.

== Seeds ==
1. (France) Éric Prodon (first round)
2. (United States) Wayne Odesnik (second round, retired)
3. (Brazil) Rogério Dutra da Silva (quarterfinals)
4. (Slovenia) Blaž Kavčič (final)
5. (Argentina) Diego Junqueira (semifinals)
6. (Brazil) Ricardo Mello (second round)
7. (Spain) Rubén Ramírez Hidalgo (second round, retired)
8. (Italy) Simone Bolelli (champions)

== Draw ==
=== Key ===
- Q = Qualifier
- WC = Wild card
- LL = Lucky loser
- Alt = Alternate
- SE = Special exempt
- PR = Protected ranking
- ITF = ITF entry
- JE = Junior exempt
- w/o = Walkover
- r = Retired
- d = Defaulted
- SR = Special ranking

=== Finals ===
Semifinals
(Brazil) Thiago Alves	3	4
4	(Slovenia) Blaž Kavčič	6	6
8	(Italy) Simone Bolelli	6	7
5	(Argentina) Diego Junqueira	3	5

Final
4	(Slovenia) Blaž Kavčič	3	4
8	(Italy) Simone Bolelli	6	6

=== Top half ===
First round
1	(France) É Prodon	6	3	4
(Croatia) N Mektić	3	6	6
WC	(Brazil) T Fernandes	6	2	6
(Argentina) A Velotti	4	6	2
Q	(Brazil) T Monteiro	0	4
(Brazil) T Alves	6	6
(Argentina) JP Brzezicki	4	3
6	(Brazil) R Mello	6	6
4	(Slovenia) B Kavčič	6	6
WC	(Brazil) B Sant'anna	4	4
(Croatia) A Veić	1	3
(Argentina) P Galdón	6	6
(Portugal) G Elias	6	6
Q	(Brazil) F Romboli	2	2
(Brazil) J Silva	5	4
7	(Spain) R Ramírez Hidalgo	7	6

Second round
(Croatia) N Mektić	6	5	7
WC	(Brazil) T Fernandes	3	7	5
(Brazil) T Alves	6	1	6
6	(Brazil) R Mello	2	6	1
4	(Slovenia) B Kavčič	4	6	6
(Argentina) P Galdón	6	3	3
(Portugal) G Elias	6	2
7	(Spain) R Ramírez Hidalgo	2	1^{r}

Quarterfinals
(Croatia) N Mektić	1	2
(Brazil) T Alves	6	6
4	(Slovenia) B Kavčič	2	6	6
(Portugal) G Elias	6	2	4

Semifinals
(Brazil) T Alves	3	4
4	(Slovenia) B Kavčič	6	6

=== Bottom half ===
First round
8	(Italy) S Bolelli	6	6
(Brazil) Tiago Lopes	3	1
(Brazil) F de Paula	6	1	6
(Brazil) G Clézar	4	6	3
(Brazil) A Ghem	6	6
WC	(Uruguay) M Cuevas	1	1
(Spain) J Martí	4	3
3	(Brazil) R Dutra da Silva	6	6
5	(Argentina) D Junqueira	6	6
Q	(Brazil) C Lindell	2	4
(Serbia) N Ćirić	6^{10}	1
(Argentina) F Argüello	7^{12}	6
WC	(Brazil) JP Sorgi	0	1
(Brazil) R Hocevar	6	6
Q	(Brazil) L Kirche	4	6	5
2	(United States) W Odesnik	6	4	7

Second round
8	(Italy) S Bolelli	6	7
(Brazil) F de Paula	3	5
(Brazil) A Ghem	4	4
3	(Brazil) R Dutra da Silva	6	6
5	(Argentina) D Junqueira	2	6	7^{7}
(Argentina) F Argüello	6	2	6^{5}
(Brazil) R Hocevar	7^{7}	2	1
2	(United States) W Odesnik	6^{3}	6	2^{r}

Quarterfinals
8	(Italy) S Bolelli	7^{7}	6
3	(Brazil) R Dutra da Silva	6^{1}	2
5	(Argentina) D Junqueira	4	6	6
(Brazil) R Hocevar	6	0	4

Semifinals
8	(Italy) S Bolelli	6	7
5	(Argentina) D Junqueira	3	5
