= 2009 Rijeka Open =

- Date: June 29 – July 5
- Edition: 3rd
- Location: Rijeka, Croatia

Champions

Singles
- (Italy) Paolo Lorenzi

Doubles
- (Argentina) Sebastián Decoud / (Spain) Miguel Ángel López Jaén
← 2008 ·	Rijeka Open	· 2010 →

The 2009 Rijeka Open was a professional tennis tournament played on outdoor red clay courts. It was the 3rd edition of the tournament which was part of the 2009 ATP Challenger Tour. It took place in Rijeka, Croatia between 29 June and 5 July 2009.

That was the last tournament for Mathieu Montcourt who died on 6 July 2009 in Boulogne-Billancourt. He played very well in Rijeka, reaching the semifinals where he lost to Blaž Kavčič. A police source said on 9 July 2009 after a preliminary autopsy that Mathieu suffered a cardiac arrest.

== Singles entrants ==
=== Seeds ===
Nationality	Player	Ranking*	Seeding
ESP	Iván Navarro	68	1
FRA	Mathieu Montcourt	104	2
CRO	Roko Karanušić	110	3
ESP	Rubén Ramírez Hidalgo	115	4
AUS	Peter Luczak	158	5
ESP	Daniel Muñoz de la Nava	167	6
ARG	Sebastián Decoud	169	7
SUI	Stéphane Bohli	180	8

- Rankings are as of June 22, 2009.

=== Other entrants ===
The following players received wildcards into the singles main draw:

- (Croatia) Ivan Cerović
- (Croatia) Marcel Ružić
- (Croatia) Antonio Sančić
- (Croatia) Franko Škugor

The following players received entry from the qualifying draw:

- (Slovakia) Pavol Červenák
- (Serbia) Nikola Ćirić
- (Chile) Adrián García (as a Lucky Loser)
- (Croatia) Nikola Mektić
- (Italy) Simone Vagnozzi

== Champions ==
=== Singles ===
(Italy) Paolo Lorenzi def. (Slovenia) Blaž Kavčič, 6–3, 7–6(2)

=== Doubles ===
(Argentina) Sebastián Decoud / (Spain) Miguel Ángel López Jaén def. (Croatia) Ivan Dodig / (Croatia) Antonio Veić, 7–6(7), 3–6, [10–8]
