= 2009 Mamaia Challenger – Singles =

Singles
- 2009 Mamaia Challenger

Final
- Champion: (Slovenia) Blaž Kavčič
- Runner-up: (Germany) Julian Reister
- Score: 3–6, 6–3, 6–4

Events
Singles	Doubles
← 2008 ·	Mamaia Challenger	· 2010 →

Nicolas Devilder was the defending champion, but he chose to not participate this year.
Blaž Kavčič won in the final 3–6, 6–3, 6–4, against Julian Reister.

== Seeds ==
1. (Italy) Marco Crugnola (second round)
2. (Italy) Alessio di Mauro (first round)
3. (Spain) Pablo Santos (first round)
4. (Slovenia) Blaž Kavčič (champion)
5. (Serbia) Boris Pašanski (second round, retired)
6. (Netherlands) Thiemo de Bakker (first round, retired)
7. (Germany) Dieter Kindlmann (quarterfinals)
8. (Germany) Julian Reister (final)

== Draw ==
=== Key ===
- Q = Qualifier
- WC = Wild card
- LL = Lucky loser
- Alt = Alternate
- SE = Special exempt
- PR = Protected ranking
- ITF = ITF entry
- JE = Junior exempt
- w/o = Walkover
- r = Retired
- d = Defaulted
- SR = Special ranking

=== Final four ===
Semifinals
(Brazil) João Souza	4	6^{4}
4	(Slovenia) Blaž Kavčič	6	7
8	(Germany) Julian Reister	6	6
(Austria) Andreas Haider-Maurer	1	1

Final
4	(Slovenia) Blaž Kavčič	3	6	6
8	(Germany) Julian Reister	6	3	4

=== Top half ===
First round
1	(Italy) M Crugnola	7	6
(Spain) C Poch-Gradin	6^{5}	1
(Latvia) D Pavlovs	4	6	1
(Czech Republic) J Pospíšil	6	2	6
(Brazil) J Souza	7	6
Q	(Poland) G Panfil	6^{2}	4
WC	(Romania) A Mlendea	6
6	(Netherlands) T de Bakker	4	r
4	(Slovenia) B Kavčič	6	6
Q	(Bulgaria) I Traykov	4	1
(Romania) G Moraru	3	4
(Spain) D Marrero	6	6
(Japan) J Mitsuhashi	0	3
(Romania) A Ungur	6	6
(Romania) A Cruciat	3	r
5	(Serbia) B Pašanski	3

Second round
1	(Italy) M Crugnola	3	4
(Czech Republic) J Pospíšil	6	6
(Brazil) J Souza	6	6
WC	(Romania) A Mlendea	3	4
4	(Slovenia) B Kavčič	6	6
(Spain) D Marrero	3	3
(Romania) A Ungur	7	3
5	(Serbia) B Pašanski	6^{2}	0	r

Quarterfinals
(Czech Republic) J Pospíšil	4	6^{3}
(Brazil) J Souza	6	7
4	(Slovenia) B Kavčič	1	6	6
(Romania) A Ungur	6	1	3

Semifinals
(Brazil) J Souza	4	6^{4}
4	(Slovenia) B Kavčič	6	7

=== Bottom half ===
First round
8	(Germany) J Reister	6	6
WC	(Romania) A Săvulescu	3	0
Q	(Romania) P-A Luncanu	2	6	6
(Slovakia) K Čapkovič	6	4	3
(Argentina) D Álvarez	2	3
(Italy) G Petrazzuolo	6	6
(Spain) F Vicente	6	6
3	(Spain) P Santos	4	3
7	(Germany) D Kindlmann	6	6
WC	(Romania) A-M Constantin	0	3
(Argentina) J-P Amado	0	2
(Ukraine) A Smirnov	6	6
(Austria) A Haider-Maurer	6	6
WC	(Romania) A-M Dăncescu	3	2
(Brazil) R Dutra da Silva	6	6
2	(Italy) A di Mauro	2	1

Second round
8	(Germany) J Reister	6	6
Q	(Romania) P-A Luncanu	2	0
(Italy) G Petrazzuolo	3	3
(Spain) F Vicente	6	6
7	(Germany) D Kindlmann	6	6
(Ukraine) A Smirnov	4	3
(Austria) A Haider-Maurer	3	6	6
(Brazil) R Dutra da Silva	6	4	2

Quarterfinals
8	(Germany) J Reister	6	6
(Spain) F Vicente	2	0
7	(Germany) D Kindlmann	6	2	1
(Austria) A Haider-Maurer	1	6	6

Semifinals
8	(Germany) J Reister	6	6
(Austria) A Haider-Maurer	1	1
