= 2019 Bangkok Challenger =

- Date: 11–17 February
- Edition: 11th
- Surface: Hard
- Location: Bangkok, Thailand

Champions

Singles
- (Switzerland) Henri Laaksonen

Doubles
- (China) Gong Maoxin / (China) Zhang Ze
← 2018 ·	Bangkok Challenger	· 2020 →

The 2019 Bangkok Challenger was a professional tennis tournament played on hard courts. It was the eleventh edition of the tournament and was part of the 2019 ATP Challenger Tour. It took place in Bangkok, Thailand between 11 and 17 February 2019.

== Singles main-draw entrants ==
=== Seeds ===
Country	Player	Rank^{1}	Seed
IND	Prajnesh Gunneswaran	103	1
JPN	Tatsuma Ito	140	2
SUI	Henri Laaksonen	143	3
FRA	Corentin Moutet	145	4
JPN	Yūichi Sugita	160	5
AUS	Marc Polmans	170	6
JPN	Hiroki Moriya	178	7
SRB	Viktor Troicki	185	8
KAZ	Aleksandr Nedovyesov	190	9
GER	Tobias Kamke	206	10
CHN	Zhang Ze	208	11
JPN	Go Soeda	214	12
ITA	Gianluca Mager	222	13
ISR	Dudi Sela	226	14
ESP	Alejandro Davidovich Fokina	236	15
NED	Thiemo de Bakker	238	16

- ^{1} Rankings are as of 4 February 2019.

=== Other entrants ===
The following players received wildcards into the singles main draw:

- (Thailand) Palaphoom Kovapitukted
- (Thailand) Natthasith Kunsuwan
- (Serbia) Janko Tipsarević
- (Thailand) Wishaya Trongcharoenchaikul
- (Thailand) Pol Wattanakul

The following player received entry into the singles main draw as an alternate:

- (Kazakhstan) Denis Yevseyev

The following players received entry into the singles main draw using their ITF World Tennis Ranking:

- (Bulgaria) Dimitar Kuzmanov
- (Russia) Ivan Nedelko
- (Spain) David Pérez Sanz
- (Spain) Oriol Roca Batalla

The following players received entry from the qualifying draw:

- (Russia) Ivan Gakhov
- (Russia) Evgenii Tiurnev

== Champions ==
=== Singles ===
- (Switzerland) Henri Laaksonen def. (Israel) Dudi Sela 6–2, 6–4.

=== Doubles ===
- (China) Gong Maoxin / (China) Zhang Ze def. (Chinese Taipei) Hsieh Cheng-peng / (Indonesia) Christopher Rungkat 6–4, 6–4.
