= 2017 Bangkok Challenger – Doubles =

Doubles
- 2017 Bangkok Challenger

Final
- Champions: (France) Grégoire Barrère (France) Jonathan Eysseric
- Runners-up: (Japan) Yūichi Sugita (China) Wu Di
- Score: 6–3, 6–2

Events
Singles	Doubles
← 2016 ·	Bangkok Challenger	· 2018 →

Johan Brunström and Andreas Siljeström were the defending champions but chose not to defend their title.

Grégoire Barrère and Jonathan Eysseric won the title after defeating Yūichi Sugita and Wu Di 6–3, 6–2 in the final.

== Seeds ==
1. (United Kingdom) Jonathan Marray / (Canada) Adil Shamasdin (first round)
2. (Thailand) Sanchai Ratiwatana / (Thailand) Sonchat Ratiwatana (semifinals)
3. (Russia) Mikhail Elgin / (Uzbekistan) Denis Istomin (first round)
4. (Germany) Kevin Krawietz / (France) Albano Olivetti (quarterfinals)

== Draw ==
=== Key ===
- Q = Qualifier
- WC = Wild card
- LL = Lucky loser
- Alt = Alternate
- SE = Special exempt
- PR = Protected ranking
- ITF = ITF entry
- JE = Junior exempt
- w/o = Walkover
- r = Retired
- d = Defaulted
- SR = Special ranking

First round
1	(United Kingdom) J Marray (Canada) A Shamasdin	6	3	[5]
(Japan) Y Sugita (China) D Wu	2	6	[10]
(Belgium) Y Mertens (Spain) J Samper-Montaña	4	6	[10]
WC	(Thailand) Patcharapol Kawin (Thailand) Werapath Sirijatiyaporn	6	1	[8]
4	(Germany) K Krawietz (France) A Olivetti	5	6	[10]
(Germany) Jeremy Jahn (Belgium) Y Reuter	7	2	[5]
(Kazakhstan) D Popko (Israel) A Weintraub	3	1
(Chinese Taipei) T Chen (Chinese Taipei) C-h Yi	6	6
(Romania) M Copil (Estonia) J Zopp	6	6
WC	(Thailand) Phassawit Burapharitta (Thailand) Chaleechan Tanasugarn	2	1
(France) G Barrère (France) J Eysseric	7^{7}	6
3	(Russia) M Elgin (Uzbekistan) D Istomin	6^{3}	4
(Chile) C Garin (Japan) A Santillan	6	6
WC	(Thailand) Chayanon Kaewsuto (Thailand) W Sornbutnark	1	2
PR	(United States) JP Fruttero (Chinese Taipei) H-y Peng	4	4
2	(Thailand) Sa Ratiwatana (Thailand) So Ratiwatana	6	6

Quarterfinals
(Japan) Y Sugita (China) D Wu	7	6
(Belgium) Y Mertens (Spain) J Samper-Montaña	5	4
4	(Germany) K Krawietz (France) A Olivetti	1	6^{5}
(Chinese Taipei) T Chen (Chinese Taipei) C-h Yi	6	7^{7}
(Romania) M Copil (Estonia) J Zopp	3	6	[8]
(France) G Barrère (France) J Eysseric	6	3	[10]
(Chile) C Garin (Japan) A Santillan	4	6^{4}
2	(Thailand) Sa Ratiwatana (Thailand) So Ratiwatana	6	7^{7}

Semifinals
(Japan) Y Sugita (China) D Wu	6	4	[10]
(Chinese Taipei) T Chen (Chinese Taipei) C-h Yi	0	6	[5]
(France) G Barrère (France) J Eysseric	7^{7}	7^{7}
2	(Thailand) Sa Ratiwatana (Thailand) So Ratiwatana	6^{5}	6^{4}

Final
(Japan) Y Sugita (China) D Wu	3	2
(France) G Barrère (France) J Eysseric	6	6
