= 2017 Bangkok Challenger – Singles =

Singles
- 2017 Bangkok Challenger

Final
- Champion: (Serbia) Janko Tipsarević
- Runner-up: (Slovenia) Blaž Kavčič
- Score: 6–3, 7–6^{(7–1)}

Events
Singles	Doubles
- Bangkok Challenger

Mikhail Youzhny was the defending champion but chose not to defend his title.

Janko Tipsarević won the title after defeating Blaž Kavčič 6–3, 7–6^{(7–1)} in the final.

== Seeds ==
1. (Japan) Yūichi Sugita (semifinals)
2. (Uzbekistan) Denis Istomin (second round)
3. (Romania) Marius Copil (quarterfinals)
4. (Switzerland) Henri Laaksonen (second round)
5. (Serbia) Janko Tipsarević (champion)
6. (China) Wu Di (second round)
7. (Germany) Maximilian Marterer (semifinals)
8. (Belgium) Yannik Reuter (first round)

== Draw ==
Key

- Q = Qualifier
- WC = Wild card
- LL = Lucky loser
- Alt = Alternate
- ITF = ITF entry
- PR = Protected ranking
- SR = Special ranking
- SE = Special exempt
- JE = Junior exempt
- JR = Junior Accelerator Programme entrant
- CO = College Accelerator Programme entrant
- NG = Next Gen Accelerator Program entrant
- w/o = Walkover
- r = Retired
- d = Defaulted

=== Finals ===
Semifinals
1	(Japan) Yūichi Sugita	1	6^{8}
5	(Serbia) Janko Tipsarević	6	7^{10}
7	(Germany) Maximilian Marterer	6	6^{3}	2
(Slovenia) Blaž Kavčič	4	7^{7}	6

Final
5	(Serbia) Janko Tipsarević	6	7^{7}
(Slovenia) Blaž Kavčič	3	6^{1}

=== Top half ===
First round
1	(Japan) Y Sugita	7^{9}	5	6
Q	(Germany) N Langer	6^{7}	7	0
(Turkey) M İlhan	4	6	7^{7}
(Kazakhstan) D Popko	6	4	6^{4}
(Germany) Jeremy Jahn	7	6
(Japan) A Santillan	5	3
WC	(Thailand) Chayanon Kaewsuto	0	1
6	(China) D Wu	6	6
4	(Switzerland) H Laaksonen	6	6
(United States) S Bangoura	4	2
(Belgium) Y Mertens	6	6
(France) J Eysseric	4	2
PR	(Germany) C-M Stebe	6	6
WC	(Thailand) Patcharapol Kawin	4	3
Q	(Estonia) J Zopp	4	1
5	(Serbia) J Tipsarević	6	6

Second round
1	(Japan) Y Sugita	6	6
(Turkey) M İlhan	2	4
(Germany) J Jahn	6	3	6
6	(China) D Wu	3	6	4
4	(Switzerland) H Laaksonen	2	3
(Belgium) Y Mertens	6	6
PR	(Germany) C-M Stebe	2	3
5	(Serbia) J Tipsarević	6	6

Quarterfinals
1	(Japan) Y Sugita	6	6
(Germany) J Jahn	0	4
(Belgium) Y Mertens	2	4
5	(Serbia) J Tipsarević	6	6

Semifinals
1	(Japan) Y Sugita	1	6^{8}
5	(Serbia) J Tipsarević	6	7^{10}

=== Bottom half ===
First round
7	(Germany) M Marterer	6	6
Q	(South Korea) S-w Kwon	0	4
(France) G Barrère	3	5
Q	(United Kingdom) L Glasspool	6	7
(Spain) J Samper Montaña	6	3	4
(Czech Republic) Z Kolář	2	6	6
WC	(Thailand) W Sornbutnark	2	0
3	(Romania) M Copil	6	6
8	(Belgium) Y Reuter	2	1
(Slovenia) B Kavčič	6	6
(Japan) Yuya Kibi	3	4
(Israel) A Weintraub	6	6
(Russia) A Karatsev	3	3
(Chile) C Garin	6	6
WC	(Thailand) Congsup Congcar	0	1
2	(Uzbekistan) D Istomin	6	6

Second round
7	(Germany) M Marterer	6^{6}	6	6
Q	(United Kingdom) L Glasspool	7^{8}	4	3
(Czech Republic) Z Kolář	4	1
3	(Romania) M Copil	6	6
(Slovenia) B Kavčič	6	6
(Israel) A Weintraub	4	1
(Chile) C Garin	3	6	7
2	(Uzbekistan) D Istomin	6	4	5

Quarterfinals
7	(Germany) M Marterer	6	7^{10}
3	(Romania) M Copil	4	6^{8}
(Slovenia) B Kavčič	7^{7}	6
(Chile) C Garin	6^{1}	1

Semifinals
7	(Germany) M Marterer	6	6^{3}	2
(Slovenia) B Kavčič	4	7^{7}	6
