= 2019 Bangkok Challenger – Singles =

Singles
- 2019 Bangkok Challenger

Final
- Champion: (Switzerland) Henri Laaksonen
- Runner-up: (Israel) Dudi Sela
- Score: 6–2, 6–4

Events
Singles	Doubles
- Bangkok Challenger

Marcel Granollers was the defending champion but chose not to defend his title.

Henri Laaksonen won the title after defeating Dudi Sela 6–2, 6–4 in the final.

== Seeds ==
All seeds receive a bye into the second round.

1. (India) Prajnesh Gunneswaran (second round)
2. (Japan) Tatsuma Ito (semifinals, retired)
3. (Switzerland) Henri Laaksonen (champion)
4. (France) Corentin Moutet (second round)
5. (Japan) Yūichi Sugita (third round)
6. (Australia) Marc Polmans (second round)
7. (Japan) Hiroki Moriya (second round)
8. (Serbia) Viktor Troicki (third round)
9. (Kazakhstan) Aleksandr Nedovyesov (second round)
10. (Germany) Tobias Kamke (quarterfinals)
11. (China) Zhang Ze (second round)
12. (Japan) Go Soeda (quarterfinals)
13. (Italy) Gianluca Mager (third round, retired)
14. (Israel) Dudi Sela (final)
15. (Spain) Alejandro Davidovich Fokina (third round)
16. (Netherlands) Thiemo de Bakker (third round)

== Draw ==
Key

- Q = Qualifier
- WC = Wild card
- LL = Lucky loser
- Alt = Alternate
- ITF = ITF entry
- PR = Protected ranking
- SR = Special ranking
- SE = Special exempt
- JE = Junior exempt
- JR = Junior Accelerator Programme entrant
- CO = College Accelerator Programme entrant
- NG = Next Gen Accelerator Program entrant
- w/o = Walkover
- r = Retired
- d = Defaulted

=== Finals ===
Quarterfinals
(United States) JC Aragone	6^{3}	5
(Australia) James Duckworth	7^{7}	7
3	(Switzerland) Henri Laaksonen	7^{7}	4	6
12	(Japan) Go Soeda	6^{4}	6	3
10	(Germany) Tobias Kamke	6	4	2
14	(Israel) Dudi Sela	1	6	6
(South Korea) Kwon Soon-woo	3	6	1
2	(Japan) Tatsuma Ito	6	4	6

Semifinals
(Australia) James Duckworth	6^{5}	7	4
3	(Switzerland) Henri Laaksonen	7^{7}	5	6
14	(Israel) Dudi Sela	4
2	(Japan) Tatsuma Ito	2^{r}

Final
3	(Switzerland) Henri Laaksonen	6	6
14	(Israel) Dudi Sela	2	4

=== Top half ===
==== Section 1 ====
First round
(United States) JC Aragone	6	6
(Portugal) G Elias	4	2
(Portugal) G Oliveira	4	4
(Spain) E López Pérez	6	6
(Australia) J Duckworth	6	7
ITF	(Russia) I Nedelko	3	5
(Chinese Taipei) T-h Yang	2	6	4
WC	(Serbia) J Tipsarević	6	4	6

Second round
1	(India) P Gunneswaran	3	1
(United States) JC Aragone	6	6
(Spain) E López Pérez	5	3
13	(Italy) G Mager	7	6
11	(China) Ze Zhang	5	3
(Australia) J Duckworth	7	6
WC	(Serbia) J Tipsarević	6	3	6
6	(Australia) M Polmans	2	6	3

Third round
(United States) JC Aragone	7^{9}	6^{5}	2
13	(Italy) G Mager	6^{7}	7^{7}	0^{r}
(Australia) J Duckworth	4	6	6
WC	(Serbia) J Tipsarević	6	3	2

Quarterfinals
(United States) JC Aragone	6^{3}	5
(Australia) J Duckworth	7^{7}	7

==== Section 2 ====
First round
(France) S Robert	5	6	6
WC	(Thailand) P Kovapitukted	7	3	4
(China) Z Li	6	7^{9}
(India) S Myneni	4	6^{7}
(Australia) B Mousley	2	6	2
WC	(Thailand) Pol Wattanakul	6	3	6
WC	(Thailand) W Trongcharoenchaikul	3	3
(South Korea) D-h Lee	6	6

Second round
3	(Switzerland) H Laaksonen	6	6
(France) S Robert	3	1
(China) Z Li	4	6	4
16	(Netherlands) T de Bakker	6	4	6
12	(Japan) G Soeda	6	6
WC	(Thailand) P Wattanakul	3	3
(South Korea) D-h Lee	1	2
8	(Serbia) V Troicki	6	6

Third round
3	(Switzerland) H Laaksonen	6	6
16	(Netherlands) T de Bakker	4	3
12	(Japan) G Soeda	6	6
8	(Serbia) V Troicki	0	4

Quarterfinals
3	(Switzerland) H Laaksonen	7^{7}	4	6
12	(Japan) G Soeda	6^{4}	6	3

=== Bottom half ===
==== Section 3 ====
First round
Q	(Russia) E Tiurnev	3	1
ITF	(Bulgaria) D Kuzmanov	6	6
Alt	(Kazakhstan) D Yevseyev	6	6
(France) C Hemery	2	2
(China) D Wu	7^{7}	2	2
(Lithuania) L Grigelis	6^{3}	6	6
(United States) K King	4	7^{7}	3
(Australia) M Purcell	6	6^{3}	6

Second round
5	(Japan) Y Sugita	6	6
ITF	(Bulgaria) D Kuzmanov	4	4
Alt	(Kazakhstan) D Yevseyev	5	1
10	(Germany) T Kamke	7	6
14	(Israel) D Sela	6^{5}	6	6
(Lithuania) L Grigelis	7^{7}	0	2
(Australia) M Purcell	1	6	6
4	(France) C Moutet	6	3	3

Third round
5	(Japan) Y Sugita	6	0	4
10	(Germany) T Kamke	3	6	6
14	(Israel) D Sela	6	6
(Australia) M Purcell	2	2

Quarterfinals
10	(Germany) T Kamke	6	4	2
14	(Israel) D Sela	1	6	6

==== Section 4 ====
First round
(South Korea) S-w Kwon	6	6
(India) S Mukund	1	1
ITF	(Spain) O Roca Batalla	7^{7}	7
(France) E Couacaud	6^{5}	5
(Dominican Republic) J Hernández-Fernández	6	6
Q	(Russia) I Gakhov	4	1
WC	(Thailand) Natthasith Kunsuwan	2	4
ITF	(Spain) D Pérez Sanz	6	6

Second round
7	(Japan) H Moriya	1	5
(South Korea) S-w Kwon	6	7
ITF	(Spain) O Roca Batalla	6	3	7^{9}
9	(Kazakhstan) A Nedovyesov	2	6	6^{7}
15	(Spain) A Davidovich Fokina	6	7
(Dominican Republic) J Hernández-Fernández	4	5
ITF	(Spain) D Pérez Sanz	4	2
2	(Japan) T Ito	6	6

Third round
(South Korea) S-w Kwon	6	6
ITF	(Spain) O Roca Batalla	1	1
15	(Spain) A Davidovich Fokina	6	3	4
2	(Japan) T Ito	1	6	6

Quarterfinals
(South Korea) S-w Kwon	3	6	1
2	(Japan) T Ito	6	4	6
