= 2019 Bangkok Challenger – Doubles =

Doubles
- 2019 Bangkok Challenger

Final
- Champions: (China) Gong Maoxin (China) Zhang Ze
- Runners-up: (Chinese Taipei) Hsieh Cheng-peng (Indonesia) Christopher Rungkat
- Score: 6–4, 6–4

Events
Singles	Doubles
- Bangkok Challenger

Gerard and Marcel Granollers were the defending champions but chose not defend their title.

Gong Maoxin and Zhang Ze won the title after defeating Hsieh Cheng-peng and Christopher Rungkat 6–4, 6–4 in the final.

== Seeds ==
1. (Chinese Taipei) Hsieh Cheng-peng / (Indonesia) Christopher Rungkat (final)
2. (China) Gong Maoxin / (China) Zhang Ze (champions)
3. (Germany) Andre Begemann / (Australia) Rameez Junaid (first round)
4. (Uruguay) Ariel Behar / (Spain) Enrique López Pérez (first round, retired)

== Draw ==
Key

- Q = Qualifier
- WC = Wild card
- LL = Lucky loser
- Alt = Alternate
- ITF = ITF entry
- PR = Protected ranking
- SR = Special ranking
- SE = Special exempt
- JE = Junior exempt
- JR = Junior Accelerator Programme entrant
- CO = College Accelerator Programme entrant
- NG = Next Gen Accelerator Program entrant
- w/o = Walkover
- r = Retired
- d = Defaulted

First round
1	(Chinese Taipei) C-p Hsieh (Indonesia) C Rungkat	7^{13}	6
(Israel) J Erlich (Israel) D Sela	6^{11}	3
ITF	(Spain) D Pérez Sanz (Spain) O Roca Batalla	7^{9}	1	[8]
ITF	(Philippines) F Alcantara (Portugal) B Saraiva	6^{7}	6	[10]
4	(Uruguay) A Behar (Spain) E López Pérez	1^{r}
(Finland) H Heliövaara (Japan) T Matsui	1
(India) S Balaji (India) A Kadhe	6	6
(Thailand) Sa Ratiwatana (Thailand) So Ratiwatana	1	3
WC	(Thailand) J Navasirisomboon (Thailand) Chanchai Sookton-eng	2	2
WC	(Thailand) N Kadchapanan (Thailand) P Kovapitukted	6	6
(Australia) M Purcell (Australia) M Reid	6	6
3	(Germany) A Begemann (Australia) R Junaid	2	2
(Japan) H Moriya (Chinese Taipei) T-h Yang	6^{4}	4
(Portugal) G Oliveira (Australia) M Polmans	7^{7}	6
WC	(Thailand) Chotiwat Naen-Udorn (Thailand) Patthravut Saimongkol	0	0
2	(China) M Gong (China) Ze Zhang	6	6

Quarterfinals
1	(Chinese Taipei) C-p Hsieh (Indonesia) C Rungkat	6	7^{9}
ITF	(Philippines) F Alcantara (Portugal) B Saraiva	3	6^{7}
(Finland) H Heliövaara (Japan) T Matsui	6	5	[3]
(India) S Balaji (India) A Kadhe	4	7	[10]
WC	(Thailand) N Kadchapanan (Thailand) P Kovapitukted	3	3
(Australia) M Purcell (Australia) M Reid	6	6
(Portugal) G Oliveira (Australia) M Polmans	6^{3}	3
2	(China) M Gong (China) Ze Zhang	7^{7}	6

Semifinals
1	(Chinese Taipei) C-p Hsieh (Indonesia) C Rungkat	7	7^{7}
(India) S Balaji (India) A Kadhe	5	6^{3}
(Australia) M Purcell (Australia) M Reid	5	3
2	(China) M Gong (China) Ze Zhang	7	6

Final
1	(Chinese Taipei) C-p Hsieh (Indonesia) C Rungkat	4	4
2	(China) M Gong (China) Ze Zhang	6	6
