= 2018 Bangkok Challenger – Singles =

Singles
- 2018 Bangkok Challenger

Final
- Champion: (Spain) Marcel Granollers
- Runner-up: (Germany) Mats Moraing
- Score: 4–6, 6–3, 7–5

Events
Singles	Doubles
- Bangkok Challenger

Janko Tipsarević was the defending champion but chose not to defend his title.

Marcel Granollers won the title after defeating Mats Moraing 4–6, 6–3, 7–5 in the final.

== Seeds ==
1. (Germany) Yannick Maden (second round, withdrew)
2. (Japan) Go Soeda (first round)
3. (Japan) Tatsuma Ito (first round)
4. (Serbia) Nikola Milojević (first round, retired)
5. (Estonia) Jürgen Zopp (first round)
6. (Spain) Marcel Granollers (champion)
7. (China) Zhang Ze (quarterfinals, withdrew)
8. (Portugal) Gonçalo Oliveira (second round)

== Draw ==
Key

- Q = Qualifier
- WC = Wild card
- LL = Lucky loser
- Alt = Alternate
- ITF = ITF entry
- PR = Protected ranking
- SR = Special ranking
- SE = Special exempt
- JE = Junior exempt
- JR = Junior Accelerator Programme entrant
- CO = College Accelerator Programme entrant
- NG = Next Gen Accelerator Program entrant
- w/o = Walkover
- r = Retired
- d = Defaulted

=== Finals ===
Semifinals
6	(Spain) Marcel Granollers	6	6
(Slovenia) Blaž Rola	2	3
(Kazakhstan) Aleksandr Nedovyesov	6^{4}	3
Q	(Germany) Mats Moraing	7^{7}	6

Final
6	(Spain) Marcel Granollers	4	6	7
Q	(Germany) Mats Moraing	6	3	5

=== Top half ===
First round
1	(Germany) Y Maden	6	6
(Kazakhstan) D Popko	4	4
(South Korea) D-h Lee	7	6
(Chinese Taipei) T-h Yang	5	4
Q	(Italy) F Cipolla	3	6	6
(Serbia) D Petrović	6	3	3
WC	(Thailand) Vorachon Rakpuangchon	2	1
6	(Spain) M Granollers	6	6
3	(Japan) T Ito	6^{2}	6^{1}
(Slovenia) B Rola	7^{7}	7^{7}
(Argentina) M Trungelliti	6^{4}	4
(Italy) A Arnaboldi	7^{7}	6
Q	(Russia) E Karlovskiy	6	6
WC	(Thailand) Patcharapol Kawin	1	1
(Chinese Taipei) J Jung	6	6
5	(Estonia) J Zopp	1	2

Second round
1	(Germany) Y Maden
(South Korea) D-h Lee	w/o
Q	(Italy) F Cipolla	3	0
6	(Spain) M Granollers	6	6
(Slovenia) B Rola	6	6
(Italy) A Arnaboldi	4	3
Q	(Russia) E Karlovskiy	6	6
(Chinese Taipei) J Jung	4	4

Quarterfinals
(South Korea) D-h Lee	2	4
6	(Spain) M Granollers	6	6
(Slovenia) B Rola	7^{12}	6
Q	(Russia) E Karlovskiy	6^{10}	4

Semifinals
6	(Spain) M Granollers	6	6
(Slovenia) B Rola	2	3

=== Bottom half ===
First round
8	(Portugal) G Oliveira	4	6	6
(Italy) L Vanni	6	2	1
(Japan) Y Takahashi	4	4
(Kazakhstan) A Nedovyesov	6	6
WC	(Thailand) P Isaro	1	6	1
(Czech Republic) Z Kolář	6	2	6
(Serbia) M Kecmanović	6	0
4	(Serbia) N Milojević	3	0^{r}
7	(China) Ze Zhang	6	6
WC	(Thailand) W Trongcharoenchaikul	3	4
Q	(Germany) D Köpfer	5	6	6^{5}
(Egypt) M Safwat	7	0	7^{7}
(China) Z Li	3	2
(China) D Wu	6	6
Q	(Germany) M Moraing	6	6
2	(Japan) G Soeda	1	1

Second round
8	(Portugal) G Oliveira	4	3
(Kazakhstan) A Nedovyesov	6	6
(Czech Republic) Z Kolář	1	6	6
(Serbia) M Kecmanović	6	4	1
7	(China) Ze Zhang	6	6
(Egypt) M Safwat	0	1
(China) D Wu	2	2
Q	(Germany) M Moraing	6	6

Quarterfinals
(Kazakhstan) A Nedovyesov	7	3	7^{7}
(Czech Republic) Z Kolář	5	6	6^{2}
7	(China) Ze Zhang
Q	(Germany) M Moraing	w/o

Semifinals
(Kazakhstan) A Nedovyesov	6^{4}	3
Q	(Germany) M Moraing	7^{7}	6
