= 2009 Mamaia Challenger =

Tennis tournament in Romania

- Date: June 22 – June 28
- Edition: 4th
- Location: Constanța, Romania

Champions

Singles
- (Slovenia) Blaž Kavčič

Doubles
- (Chile) Adrián García / (Spain) David Marrero
← 2008 ·	Mamaia Challenger	· 2010 →

The 2009 Mamaia Challenger was a professional tennis tournament played on outdoor red clay courts. It was part of the 2009 ATP Challenger Tour. It took place in Constanța, Romania between 22 and 28 June 2009.

== Singles entrants ==
=== Seeds ===
Nationality	Player	Ranking*	Seeding
ITA	Marco Crugnola	176	1
ITA	Alessio di Mauro	181	2
ESP	Pablo Santos	185	3
SLO	Blaž Kavčič	186	4
SRB	Boris Pašanski	196	5
NED	Thiemo de Bakker	198	6
GER	Dieter Kindlmann	204	7
GER	Julian Reister	223	8

- Rankings are as of June 15, 2009.

=== Other entrants ===
The following players received wildcards into the singles main draw:

- (Romania) Alin-Mihai Constantin
- (Romania) Adrian-Marin Dăncescu
- (Romania) Andrei Mlendea
- (Romania) Andrei Săvulescu

The following players received entry from the qualifying draw:

- (Romania) Petru-Alexandru Luncanu
- (Poland) Grzegorz Panfil
- (Ukraine) Artem Smirnov
- (Bulgaria) Ivaylo Traykov

== Champions ==
=== Singles ===
(Slovenia) Blaž Kavčič def. (Germany) Julian Reister, 3–6, 6–3, 6–4

=== Doubles ===
(Chile) Adrián García / (Spain) David Marrero def. (Romania) Adrian Cruciat / (Romania) Florin Mergea, 7–6(5), 6–2
