= 2009 Busan Open Challenger Tennis – Singles =

Singles
- 2009 Busan Open Challenger Tennis

Final
- Champion: (Thailand) Danai Udomchoke
- Runner-up: (Slovenia) Blaž Kavčič
- Score: 6–2, 6–2

Events
Singles	Doubles
← 2008 ·	Busan Open Challenger Tennis	· 2010 →

Go Soeda was the defending champion but lost to his compatriot Yuichi Sugita in the first round. Danai Udomchoke became the new champion after his win against Blaž Kavčič in the final (6–2, 6–2).

== Seeds ==
1. (Japan) Go Soeda (first round)
2. (Thailand) Danai Udomchoke (champion)
3. (Germany) Florian Mayer (semifinals)
4. (South Korea) Im Kyu-tae (semifinals)
5. (Denmark) Kristian Pless (first round)
6. (Switzerland) Marco Chiudinelli (second round)
7. (Australia) Samuel Groth (quarterfinals)
8. (Slovenia) Blaž Kavčič (final)

== Draw ==
=== Key ===
- Q = Qualifier
- WC = Wild card
- LL = Lucky loser
- Alt = Alternate
- SE = Special exempt
- PR = Protected ranking
- ITF = ITF entry
- JE = Junior exempt
- w/o = Walkover
- r = Retired
- d = Defaulted
- SR = Special ranking

=== Final four ===
Semifinals
8	(Slovenia) Blaž Kavčič	6	7
4	(South Korea) Im Kyu-tae	2	5
3	(Germany) Florian Mayer	1	1
2	(Thailand) Danai Udomchoke	6	6

Final
8	(Slovenia) Blaž Kavčič	2	2
2	(Thailand) Danai Udomchoke	6	6

=== Top half ===
First round
1	(Japan) G Soeda	4	4
(Japan) Y Sugita	6	6
(Japan) T Matsui	6	4	6
(Czech Republic) J Minář	3	6	4
(United Kingdom) C Eaton	6	6
Q	(South Korea) S-Y Kim Jr.	4	3
WC	(South Korea) Y B Seo	2	1
8	(Slovenia) B Kavčič	6	6
4	(South Korea) K-t Im	6	6^{9}	6
(Chinese Taipei) T Chen	2	7	1
(Japan) J Mitsuhashi	3	4
WC	(South Korea) J-S An	6	6
(Slovakia) M Semjan	3	4
(Pakistan) A-u-H Qureshi	6	6
(Japan) T Iwami	6	6
5	(Denmark) K Pless	3	4

Second round
(Japan) Y Sugita	5	3
(Japan) T Matsui	7	6
(United Kingdom) C Eaton	2	4
8	(Slovenia) B Kavčič	6	6
4	(South Korea) K-t Im	6	7
WC	(South Korea) J-S An	2	5
(Pakistan) A-u-H Qureshi	7	6
(Japan) T Iwami	6^{5}	4

Quarterfinals
(Japan) T Matsui	1	2
8	(Slovenia) B Kavčič	6	6
4	(South Korea) K-t Im	6	4	6
(Pakistan) A-u-H Qureshi	4	6	3

Semifinals
8	(Slovenia) B Kavčič	6	7
4	(South Korea) K-t Im	2	5

=== Bottom half ===
First round
6	(Switzerland) M Chiudinelli	6	6
Q	(Japan) G Motomura	2	1
(Slovakia) L Lacko	6	6
Q	(South Korea) S-J Cho	2	4
Q	(Japan) H Kondo	2	2
(Latvia) A Juška	6	6
(South Korea) W-S Jun	4	0
3	(Germany) F Mayer	6	6
7	(Australia) S Groth	4	7	6
(Czech Republic) D Lojda	6	5	1
(Slovakia) K Čapkovič	6	7
WC	(South Korea) Y-K Lim	1	5
(Poland) G Panfil	6	6^{5}	5
WC	(South Korea) SY Jeong	4	7	7
(Japan) T Ito	6	2	3
2	(Thailand) D Udomchoke	3	6	6

Second round
6	(Switzerland) M Chiudinelli	4	4
(Slovakia) L Lacko	6	6
(Latvia) A Juška	2	1
3	(Germany) F Mayer	6	6
7	(Australia) S Groth	6	6
(Slovakia) K Čapkovič	3	2
WC	(South Korea) SY Jeong	1	0
2	(Thailand) D Udomchoke	6	6

Quarterfinals
(Slovakia) L Lacko	2	3
3	(Germany) F Mayer	6	6
7	(Australia) S Groth	6	3	4
2	(Thailand) D Udomchoke	3	6	6

Semifinals
3	(Germany) F Mayer	1	1
2	(Thailand) D Udomchoke	6	6
