= 2011 Italian Open – Men's singles qualifying =

This article displays the qualifying draw of the 2011 Italian Open (tennis).

== Players ==
=== Seeds ===
1. (Japan) Kei Nishikori (qualified)
2. (Spain) Pablo Andújar (first round)
3. (Spain) Marcel Granollers (first round, retired due to arm injury)
4. (Uruguay) Pablo Cuevas (qualified)
5. (Finland) Jarkko Nieminen (qualifying competition) (lucky loser)
6. (France) Adrian Mannarino (qualifying competition) (lucky loser)
7. (Portugal) Frederico Gil (first round)
8. (United States) Ryan Sweeting (first round)
9. (Romania) Victor Hănescu (qualified)
10. (Argentina) Carlos Berlocq (qualifying competition) (lucky loser)
11. (Spain) Pere Riba (qualified)
12. (Russia) Teymuraz Gabashvili (first round)
13. (Germany) Tobias Kamke (first round)
14. (Slovenia) Blaž Kavčič (qualifying competition)

=== Qualifiers ===
1. (Japan) Kei Nishikori
2. (Italy) Paolo Lorenzi
3. (Spain) Pere Riba
4. (Uruguay) Pablo Cuevas
5. (Russia) Igor Andreev
6. (Romania) Victor Hănescu
7. (Poland) Łukasz Kubot

=== Lucky losers ===
1. (Finland) Jarkko Nieminen
2. (France) Adrian Mannarino
3. (Argentina) Carlos Berlocq

== Qualifying draw ==
=== First qualifier ===
First round
1	(Japan) Kei Nishikori	6	7
(Argentina) Máximo González	3	5
(Argentina) Federico del Bonis	6	6
12	(Russia) Teymuraz Gabashvili	4	1

Qualifying competition
1	(Japan) Kei Nishikori	6^{4}	7	6
(Argentina) Federico del Bonis	7^{7}	5	2

=== Second qualifier ===
First round
2	(Spain) Pablo Andújar	2	6^{2}
(Italy) Paolo Lorenzi	6	7^{7}
WC	(Italy) Gianluca Naso	6	1	6
13	(Germany) Tobias Kamke	1	6	2

Qualifying competition
(Italy) Paolo Lorenzi	5
WC	(Italy) Gianluca Naso	2^{r}

=== Third qualifier ===
First round
3	(Spain) Marcel Granollers	5^{r}
(Spain) Albert Ramos	6
(Italy) Alessio di Mauro	6	3	1
11	(Spain) Pere Riba	2	6	6

Qualifying competition
(Spain) Albert Ramos	0	4
11	(Spain) Pere Riba	6	6

=== Fourth qualifier ===
First round
4	(Uruguay) Pablo Cuevas	6	6
WC	(Italy) Enrico Burzi	2	3
(Austria) Andreas Haider-Maurer	2	2
10	(Argentina) Carlos Berlocq	6	6

Qualifying competition
4	(Uruguay) Pablo Cuevas	3	6	6
10	(Argentina) Carlos Berlocq	6	3	2

=== Fifth qualifier ===
First round
5	(Finland) Jarkko Nieminen	6	6
(Netherlands) Thomas Schoorel	4	3
(Russia) Igor Andreev	6	6
8	(United States) Ryan Sweeting	4	3

Qualifying competition
5	(Finland) Jarkko Nieminen	4	5
(Russia) Igor Andreev	6	7

=== Sixth qualifier ===
First round
6	(France) Adrian Mannarino	6	3	6
WC	(Italy) Matteo Viola	4	6	2
(Germany) Julian Reister	2	6	6^{1}
9	(Romania) Victor Hănescu	6	3	7^{7}

Qualifying competition
6	(France) Adrian Mannarino	6^{3}	2
9	(Romania) Victor Hănescu	7^{7}	6

=== Seventh qualifier ===
First round
7	(Portugal) Frederico Gil	3	6^{2}
(Poland) Łukasz Kubot	6	7^{7}
WC	(Italy) Marco Crugnola	5	0^{r}
14	(Slovenia) Blaž Kavčič	7	3

Qualifying competition
(Poland) Łukasz Kubot	6	2	6
14	(Slovenia) Blaž Kavčič	2	6	3
