= 2018 Bangkok Challenger – Doubles =

Doubles
- 2018 Bangkok Challenger

Final
- Champions: (Spain) Gerard Granollers (Spain) Marcel Granollers
- Runners-up: (Czech Republic) Zdeněk Kolář (Portugal) Gonçalo Oliveira
- Score: 6–3, 7–6^{(8–6)}

Events
Singles	Doubles
- Bangkok Challenger

Grégoire Barrère and Jonathan Eysseric were the defending champions and chose not to defend their title.

Gerard and Marcel Granollers won the title after defeating Zdeněk Kolář and Gonçalo Oliveira 6–3, 7–6^{(8–6)} in the final.

== Seeds ==
1. (Thailand) Sanchai Ratiwatana / (Thailand) Sonchat Ratiwatana (semifinals)
2. (United States) James Cerretani / (United Kingdom) Joe Salisbury (first round)
3. (Japan) Toshihide Matsui / (Chinese Taipei) Yi Chu-huan (first round)
4. (Chinese Taipei) Peng Hsien-yin / (China) Zhang Ze (quarterfinals)

== Draw ==
Key

- Q = Qualifier
- WC = Wild card
- LL = Lucky loser
- Alt = Alternate
- ITF = ITF entry
- PR = Protected ranking
- SR = Special ranking
- SE = Special exempt
- JE = Junior exempt
- JR = Junior Accelerator Programme entrant
- CO = College Accelerator Programme entrant
- NG = Next Gen Accelerator Program entrant
- w/o = Walkover
- r = Retired
- d = Defaulted

First round
1	(Thailand) Sa Ratiwatana (Thailand) So Ratiwatana	7^{7}	6
Alt	(Croatia) I Sabanov (Croatia) M Sabanov	6^{2}	3
(Russia) M Elgin (Kazakhstan) T Khabibulin	6	6
WC	(Thailand) P Isaro (Thailand) W Trongcharoenchaikul	1	2
4	(Chinese Taipei) H-y Peng (China) Ze Zhang	6	6
WC	(Thailand) Congsup Congcar (Thailand) K Samrej	3	2
WC	(Thailand) Phassawit Burapharitta (Thailand) Chaleechan Tanasugarn	3	1
(Spain) G Granollers (Spain) M Granollers	6	6
PR	(Italy) F Cipolla (Kazakhstan) A Nedovyesov	6^{7}	4
(China) M Gong (China) D Wu	7^{9}	6
(Czech Republic) Z Kolář (Portugal) G Oliveira	7	7^{9}
3	(Japan) T Matsui (Chinese Taipei) C-h Yi	5	6^{7}
(Serbia) N Milojević (Egypt) M Safwat	6	6
(Denmark) F Nielsen (Republic of Ireland) D O'Hare	1	4
(Chinese Taipei) C-p Hsieh (Chinese Taipei) T-h Yang	6^{3}	6	[10]
2	(United States) J Cerretani (United Kingdom) J Salisbury	7^{7}	4	[7]

Quarterfinals
1	(Thailand) Sa Ratiwatana (Thailand) So Ratiwatana	6	3	[10]
(Russia) M Elgin (Kazakhstan) T Khabibulin	4	6	[4]
4	(Chinese Taipei) H-y Peng (China) Ze Zhang	3	6^{4}
(Spain) G Granollers (Spain) M Granollers	6	7^{7}
(China) M Gong (China) D Wu	1	5
(Czech Republic) Z Kolář (Portugal) G Oliveira	6	7
(Serbia) N Milojević (Egypt) M Safwat	6^{4}	0
(Chinese Taipei) C-p Hsieh (Chinese Taipei) T-h Yang	7^{7}	6

Semifinals
1	(Thailand) Sa Ratiwatana (Thailand) So Ratiwatana	3	4
(Spain) G Granollers (Spain) M Granollers	6	6
(Czech Republic) Z Kolář (Portugal) G Oliveira	6	3	[10]
(Chinese Taipei) C-p Hsieh (Chinese Taipei) T-h Yang	2	6	[8]

Final
(Spain) G Granollers (Spain) M Granollers	6	7^{8}
(Czech Republic) Z Kolář (Portugal) G Oliveira	3	6^{6}
