= 2012 Aberto de Florianópolis =

- Date: February 27 – March 4
- Edition: 5th
- Location: Florianópolis, Brazil

Champions

Singles
- (Italy) Simone Bolelli

Doubles
- (Slovenia) Blaž Kavčič / (Croatia) Antonio Veić
- Aberto de Florianópolis

The 2012 Aberto de Florianópolis was a professional tennis tournament played on hard courts. It was the fifth edition of the tournament which was part of the 2012 ATP Challenger Tour. It took place in Florianópolis, Brazil between February 27 and March 4, 2012.

== Singles main-draw entrants ==
=== Seeds ===
Country	Player	Rank^{1}	Seed
FRA	Éric Prodon	103	1
USA	Wayne Odesnik	107	2
BRA	Rogério Dutra da Silva	109	3
SVN	Blaž Kavčič	110	4
ARG	Diego Junqueira	112	5
BRA	Ricardo Mello	120	6
ESP	Rubén Ramírez Hidalgo	123	7
ITA	Simone Bolelli	134	8

- Rankings are as of February 20, 2012.

=== Other entrants ===
The following players received wildcards into the singles main draw:

- (Uruguay) Martín Cuevas
- (Brazil) Tiago Fernandes
- (Brazil) Bruno Sant'anna
- (Brazil) João Pedro Sorgi

The following players received entry from the qualifying draw:

- (Brazil) Leonardo Kirche
- (Brazil) Christian Lindell
- (Brazil) Thiago Monteiro
- (Brazil) Fernando Romboli

== Champions ==
=== Singles ===
(Italy) Simone Bolelli def. (Slovenia) Blaž Kavčič, 6–3, 6–4

=== Doubles ===
(Slovenia) Blaž Kavčič / (Croatia) Antonio Veić def. (Spain) Javier Martí / (Portugal) Leonardo Tavares, 6–3, 6–3
