= Mamaia Challenger =

Defunct tennis tournament
- Event name: Constanța
- Location: Constanța, Romania
- Category: ATP Challenger Tour
- Surface: Clay (red)
- Draw: 32S/32Q/16D
- Prize money: €30,000+H
- Website: www.frt.ro

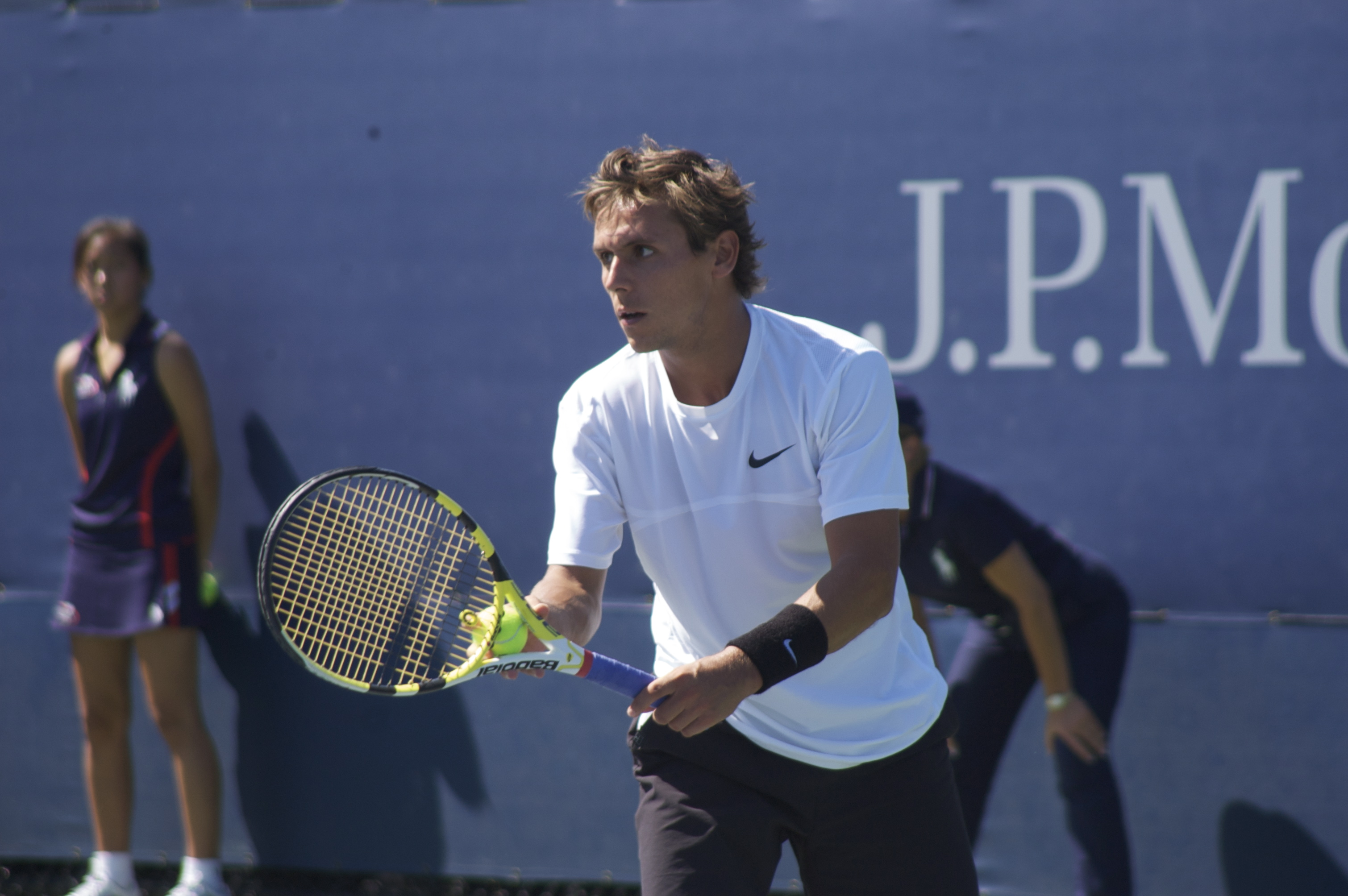
The 2008 singles champion, Nicolas Devilder from France defeated Romanian Adrian Ungur to win the title

The Mamaia Challenger was a professional tennis tournament played on outdoor red clay courts. It was part of the ATP Challenger Tour. It was held annually in Constanța, Romania, since 2006 until 2009. The tournament was discontinued in 2010 due to financial reasons.

== Past finals ==
=== Singles ===
Year	Champion	Runner-up	Score
2010	Not Held		
2009	(Slovenia) Blaž Kavčič	(Germany) Julian Reister	3–6, 6–3, 6–4
2008	(France) Nicolas Devilder	(Romania) Adrian Ungur	6–3, 6–7(5), 7–6(10)
2007	(Argentina) Sebastián Decoud	(Romania) Victor Crivoi	6–3, 6–3
2006	(Greece) Konstantinos Economidis	(Romania) Adrian Ungur	6–4, 6–4

=== Doubles ===
Year	Champions	Runners-up	Score
2010	Not Held		
2009	(Chile) Adrián García (Spain) David Marrero	(Romania) Adrian Cruciat (Romania) Florin Mergea	7–6(5), 6–2
2008	(Romania) Florin Mergea (Romania) Horia Tecău	(Brazil) Júlio Silva (Italy) Simone Vagnozzi	6–4, 6–2
2007	(Spain) Marc Fornell-Mestres (Spain) Gabriel Trujillo Soler	(Romania) Gabriel Moraru (Romania) Horia Tecău	6–4, 6–4
2006	(Greece) Konstantinos Economidis (Netherlands Antilles) Jean-Julien Rojer	(Romania) Florin Mergea (Romania) Horia Tecău	7–6(1), 6–1
