= 2018 Bangkok Challenger =

- Date: 1–7 January
- Edition: 10th
- Surface: Hard
- Location: Bangkok, Thailand

Champions

Singles
- (Spain) Marcel Granollers

Doubles
- (Spain) Gerard Granollers / (Spain) Marcel Granollers
- Bangkok Challenger

The 2018 Bangkok Challenger was a professional tennis tournament played on hard courts. It was the tenth edition of the tournament and was part of the 2018 ATP Challenger Tour. It took place in Bangkok, Thailand between 1 and 7 January 2018.

== Singles main-draw entrants ==
=== Seeds ===
Country	Player	Rank^{1}	Seed
GER	Yannick Maden	147	1
JPN	Go Soeda	150	2
JPN	Tatsuma Ito	153	3
SRB	Nikola Milojević	158	4
EST	Jürgen Zopp	163	5
ESP	Marcel Granollers	177	6
CHN	Zhang Ze	192	7
POR	Gonçalo Oliveira	194	8

- ^{1} Rankings are as of 25 December 2017.

=== Other entrants ===
The following players received wildcards into the singles main draw:

- (Thailand) Pruchya Isaro
- (Thailand) Patcharapol Kawin
- (Thailand) Vorachon Rakpuangchon
- (Thailand) Wishaya Trongcharoenchaikul

The following players received entry from the qualifying draw:

- (Italy) Flavio Cipolla
- (Russia) Evgeny Karlovskiy
- (Germany) Dominik Köpfer
- (Germany) Mats Moraing

== Champions ==
=== Singles ===
- (Spain) Marcel Granollers def. (Germany) Mats Moraing 4–6, 6–3, 7–5.

=== Doubles ===
- (Spain) Gerard Granollers / (Spain) Marcel Granollers def. (Czech Republic) Zdeněk Kolář / (Portugal) Gonçalo Oliveira 6–3, 7–6^{(8–6)}.
