= Aberto de Florianópolis =

Cyclus Open de Tênis
- 2012 Aberto de Florianópolis

Defunct tennis tournament
- Event name: Cyclus Open de Tênis
- Location: Florianópolis, Brazil
- Venue: Lagoa Iate Clube
- Category: ATP Challenger Tour
- Surface: Clay
- Draw: 32S/32Q/16D
- Prize money: $50,000+H

The Cyclus Open de Tênis was a professional tennis tournament played on outdoor clay courts. It was part of the Association of Tennis Professionals (ATP) Challenger Tour. It was held annually in Florianópolis, Brazil from 2006 to 2012.

== Past finals ==
=== Singles ===
Year	Champion	Runner-up	Score
2012	(Italy) Simone Bolelli	(Slovenia) Blaž Kavčič	6–3, 6–4
2011	Not Held		
2010	Not Held		
2009	(France) Guillaume Rufin	(Spain) Pere Riba	6–4, 3–6, 6–3
2008	(Chile) Nicolás Massú	(France) Olivier Patience	6–7(4), 6–2, 6–1
2007	(Spain) Óscar Hernández	(Argentina) Mariano Zabaleta	7–5, 7–6(6)
2006	(Argentina) Diego Junqueira	(Spain) Gorka Fraile	3–6, 6–1, 7–6(3)

=== Doubles ===
Year	Champions	Runners-up	Score
2012	(Slovenia) Blaž Kavčič (Croatia) Antonio Veić	(Spain) Javier Martí (Portugal) Leonardo Tavares	6–3, 6–3
2011	Not Held		
2010	Not Held		
2009	(Poland) Tomasz Bednarek (Poland) Mateusz Kowalczyk	(Spain) Daniel Gimeno Traver (Spain) Pere Riba	6–1, 6–4
2008	(Brazil) Rogério Dutra da Silva (Brazil) Júlio Silva	(Brazil) Ricardo Hocevar (Brazil) André Miele	3–6, 6–4, [10–4]
2007	(Brazil) Márcio Carlsson (Brazil) Lucas Engel	(Argentina) Brian Dabul (Argentina) Máximo González	6–4, 2–6, [14–12]
2006	(Argentina) Cristian Villagrán (Argentina) Juan Pablo Brzezicki	(Italy) Gianluca Naso (United States) Mirko Pehar	7–6(3), 6–2
