= Rijeka Open =

Tennis tournament in Croatia

Defunct tennis tournament
- Event name: Rijeka
- Founded: 2007
- Abolished: 2011
- Location: Rijeka, Croatia
- Category: ATP Challenger Tour
- Surface: Clay (red)
- Draw: 32S/32Q/16D
- Prize money: €30,000+H
- Website: www.rijeka-open.com

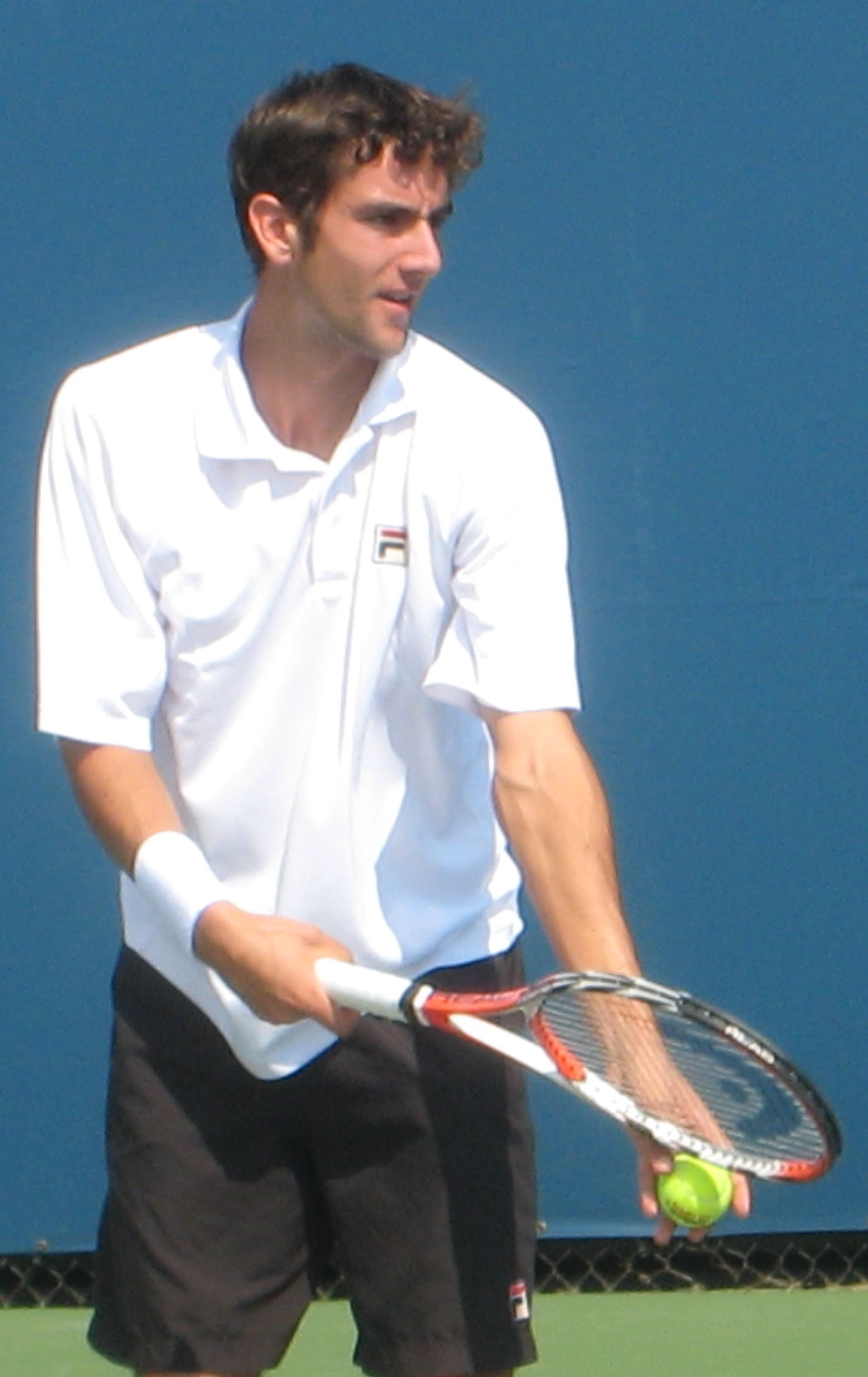
Croatian Marin Čilić won the inaugural singles event in 2007

The Rijeka Open was a professional tennis tournament played on outdoor red clay courts. It was part of the Association of Tennis Professionals (ATP) Challenger Tour from 2007 to 2011 and was held in Rijeka, Croatia.

== Past finals ==
=== Singles ===
Year	Tier	Champion	Runner-up	Score
2011	$35K+H or $30K or EUR30K	(Portugal) Rui Machado	(Slovenia) Grega Žemlja	6–3, 6–0
2010	$35K+H or $30K	(Slovenia) Blaž Kavčič	(Spain) Rubén Ramírez Hidalgo	6–4, 3–6, 7–6(5)
2009	$35K+H or $42K or EUR30K	(Italy) Paolo Lorenzi	(Slovenia) Blaž Kavčič	6–3, 7–6(2)
2008	$35K+H	(Chile) Nicolás Massú	(Belgium) Christophe Rochus	6–2, 6–2
2007	$35K+H	(Croatia) Marin Čilić	(Slovakia) Lukáš Lacko	7–5, 6–2

=== Doubles ===
Year	Tier	Champions	Runners-up	Score
2011		(Italy) Paolo Lorenzi (Brazil) Júlio Silva	(Croatia) Lovro Zovko (Croatia) Dino Marcan	6–3, 6–2
2010		(Canada) Adil Shamasdin (Croatia) Lovro Zovko	(Argentina) Carlos Berlocq (Spain) Rubén Ramírez Hidalgo	1–6, 7–6(9), [10–5]
2009		(Argentina) Sebastián Decoud (Spain) Miguel Ángel López Jaén	(Croatia) Ivan Dodig (Croatia) Antonio Veić	7–6(7), 3–6, [10–8]
2008		(Czech Republic) Dušan Karol (Czech Republic) Jaroslav Pospíšil	(United States) Alex Kuznetsov (Belgium) Dick Norman	6–4, 6–4
2007		(France) Jérôme Haehnel (Monaco) Jean-René Lisnard	(Slovakia) Ivo Klec (Slovakia) Lukáš Lacko	6–3, 6–4
