= Ivan Cerović =

Croatian tennis player

- Full name: Ivan Cerović
- Country (sports): Croatia
- Born: 1 March 1982 (age 44) Trbovlje, SR Slovenia, Yugoslavia
- Turned pro: 2001
- Retired: 2011
- Plays: Left-handed
- Prize money: $110,558

Singles
- Career record: 0–1
- Career titles: 0
- Highest ranking: No. 280 (5 May 2008)

Doubles
- Career record: 1–2
- Career titles: 0
- Highest ranking: No. 228 (26 December 2005)

Ivan Cerović (born 1 March 1982) is a former professional tennis player from Croatia.

== Biography ==
Born in Slovenia, Cerovic is from the Croatian city of Rijeka. As a junior, he made it to number 31 in the world and reached the quarter-finals of the boys' singles at the 2000 US Open.

He competed in his first ATP Tour tournament in Umag, the 2001 Croatia Open, appearing in the doubles with Marko Tkalec, for an opening round exit.

Mostly he played on the Challenger circuit and won a title in 2005, the doubles at the Samarkand Challenger.

In 2006, he featured in a Davis Cup tie for Croatia, an away fixture against Austria in Graz. The Croatians secured the tie after the doubles so Cerovic was given an opportunity in the first of the reverse singles. He lost the match to Alexander Peya in three sets.

He won a bronze medal in the mixed doubles event at the 2007 Summer Universiade in Bangkok. His partner was Serbian player Ivana Abramović.

In 2008, he returned to Umag and played in the Croatian Open for a second time. He again competed in the doubles, this time with Ivan Dodig. The pair made it to the quarter-finals.

== Challenger titles ==
=== Doubles: (1) ===
No.	Year	Tournament	Surface	Partner	Opponents	Score
1.	2005	Samarkand, Uzbekistan	Clay	(Serbia and Montenegro) Petar Popović	(Kazakhstan) Alexey Kedryuk (Ukraine) Orest Tereshchuk	6–3, 6–0

== See also ==
- List of Croatia Davis Cup team representatives
