= Blaž Kavčič =

Slovenian tennis player

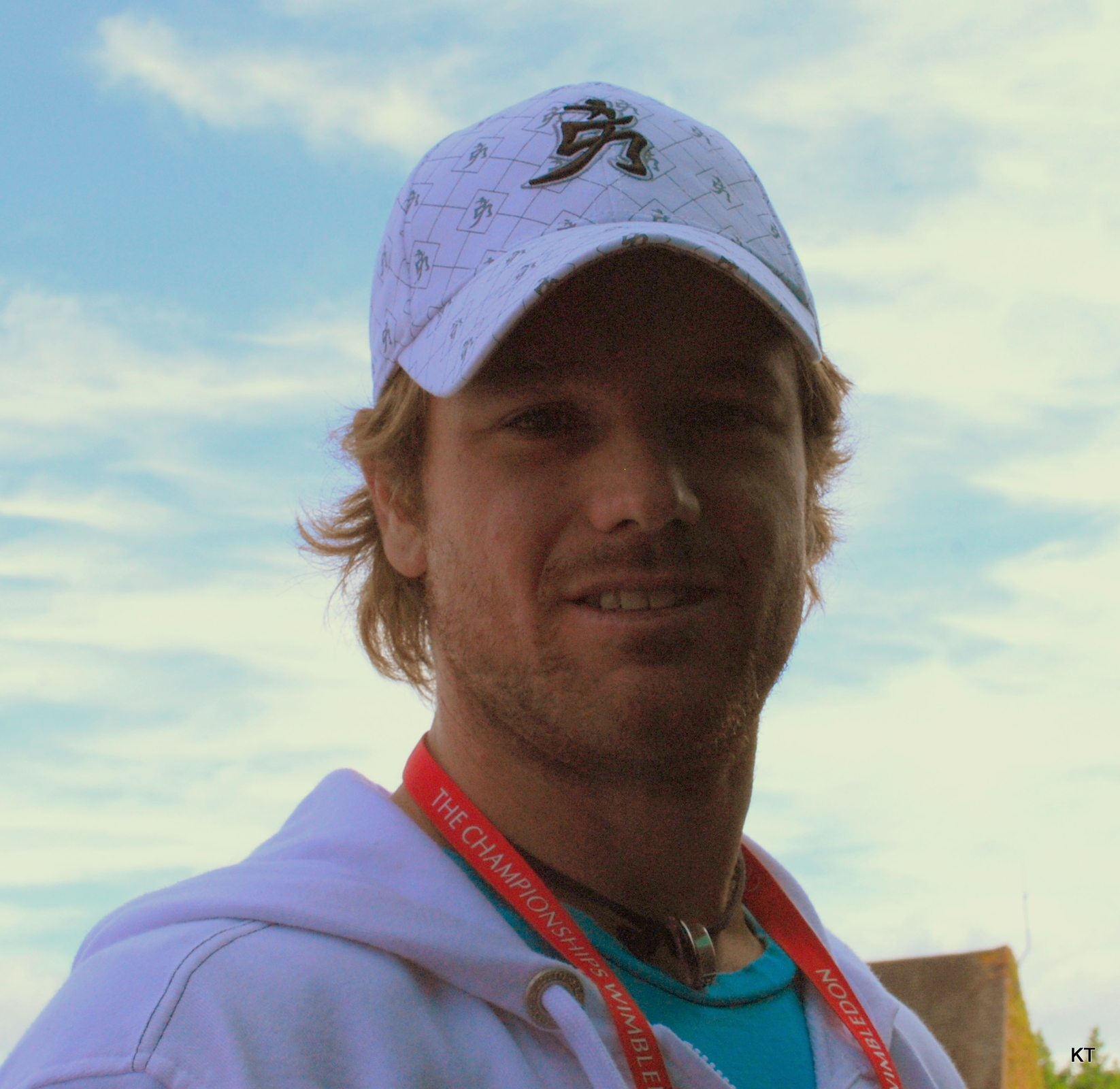
- Country (sports): Slovenia
- Residence: Dubai, UAE
- Born: 5 March 1987 (age 39) Ljubljana, SR Slovenia, Yugoslavia
- Height: 1.88 m (6 ft 2 in)
- Turned pro: 2005
- Retired: 2022 (last doubles match 2026)
- Plays: Right-handed (two-handed backhand)
- Coach: Blaž Trupej
- Prize money: US $2,019,168
- Official website: en.blazkavcic.com

Singles
- Career record: 57–89
- Career titles: 0
- Highest ranking: No. 68 (6 August 2012)

Grand Slam singles results
- Australian Open: 3R (2013)
- French Open: 2R (2010, 2011, 2012, 2013)
- Wimbledon: 2R (2015)
- US Open: 3R (2014)

Other tournaments
- Olympic Games: 2R (2012)

Doubles
- Career record: 14–17
- Career titles: 0
- Highest ranking: No. 178 (13 May 2012)

Grand Slam doubles results
- US Open: 1R (2011, 2012)
- Last updated on: 1 September 2026.

Blaž Kavčič (Slovene: [ˈbláːʒ ˈkáwtʃitʃ]; born 5 March 1987) is a Slovenian tennis coach and a former professional player. He was the highest ranked Slovenian male player ever, achieving a career-high of World No. 68 in August 2012, until Aljaž Bedene began to play for Slovenia again in January 2018, overtaking him with a career high ranking of 49. He became the first Slovenian ATP singles player to: achieve a Top 100 ranking, win a Grand Slam main draw match and perform at the Summer Olympics. He became the second Slovene ATP player earning over 2 million US dollars in prize money and is the second highest ever paid male Slovene player in history after Aljaž Bedene.

== Tennis career ==
=== 2005–2007: Turning pro, Davis Cup debut ===
Kavčič turned professional in 2005 playing exclusively on the ATP Futures and ATP Challenger Series circuit for three seasons.

In 2006, Kavčič made his Davis Cup debut for Slovenia.

=== 2008–2009: ATP Challenger debut ===
In 2008 he qualified for the ATP event in Zagreb, where he lost to Roko Karanušić. In Pörtschach he defeated Teymuraz Gabashvili in the first round before losing to Igor Kunitsyn. He finished the year ranked No. 260.

In 2009 he didn't play in any of ATP Tour main draws. He played in qualifications of three Grand Slams, but lost all of them. He also played in Davis Cup.

=== 2010–2011: Major debut and first wins ===
In 2010 he reached the second round in Houston on clay, but lost to big serving Sam Querrey.

Kavčič played in the 2010 French Open where he won his first grand slam match by defeating Eduardo Schwank. He became the first Slovenian male player to directly qualify for a Grand Slam tournament without having to go through qualifying rounds.

Together with Slovenia Davis Cup Team he won the 2010 Davis Cup Europe/Africa Zone Group II, ensuring Slovenia to advance to Europe/Africa Zone Group I.

In 2011 in Chennai he reached his first career quarterfinal on the ATP Tour. He lost there against Tomáš Berdych from Czech Republic.

At the 2011 Australian Open he reached the second round for the first time in his career. He was the first Slovenian ATP player ever in the second round of the Major in Australia.

As the first Slovenian player to participate in the ATP Masters 1000 series, he made his debut at 2011 Sony Ericsson Open in Miami and lost in three sets in the first round against Olivier Rochus.

At the 2011 Serbia Open he lost his second quarterfinal match in straight sets against Novak Djokovic.

At the 2011 Swedish Open he lost his third quarterfinal match against Tomáš Berdych.

At the 2011 US Open he played his first tournament where he lost in the first round. He also played his first Grand Slam men's doubles and lost in the first round.

=== 2012: Career high ranking, historic Olympics debut ===
At the 2012 Australian Open he lost in the second round against Juan Martín del Potro.

At the 2012 French Open he lost in straight sets in the second round against Novak Djokovic.

At the 2012 Summer Olympics he reached second round where he lost against David Ferrer. He was the first Slovenian who competed in the men's singles tennis competition at the Olympic Games.

=== 2013–2014: Two Grand Slam third rounds ===
At the 2013 Australian Open, Kavcic made it to the third round of a grand slam for the first time in his career, defeating the 29th seed Thomaz Bellucci and local wildcard James Duckworth, before losing to 7th seed Jo-Wilfried Tsonga in straight sets.

At the 2013 French Open he lost in five sets in the second round against Andreas Seppi.

At the 2014 US Open he reached the third round for the first time at this Major, defeating Donald Young and 30th seed Jeremy Chardy on the way but withdrew from his third round match with third seed Stan Wawrinka.

=== 2020–2021: Thirty Challenger finals and third doubles title ===
At the 2021 Zadar Open he won his third Challenger doubles title partnering his good friend Blaž Rola. At the 2021 Split Open he lost to Rola in his 31st Challenger singles final.

=== 2022: Retirement ===
He officially announced his retirement in April at the end of the season in September after the Davis Cup.

== Coaching career ==
He coached Max Purcell & Jordan Thompson, when they won the 2024 US Open men's doubles title and also worked with Tamara Zidanšek and the Slovenia BJK Cup team. Kavčič is currently coaching Peyton Stearns since May 2025.

== ATP Challenger and ITF Futures finals ==
=== Singles: 36 (19–17) ===
Legend (singles) ATP Challenger Tour (17–14) ITF Futures Tour (2–3)	Finals by surface Hard (10–10) Clay (9–7) Grass (0–0)

Result	W–L	Date	Tournament	Tier	Surface	Opponent	Score
Win	1–0	Aug 2006	Croatia F4, Čakovec	Futures	Clay	(North Macedonia) Predrag Rusevski	6–3, 6–3
Win	2–0	Sep 2006	Croatia F6, Zagreb	Futures	Clay	(Slovenia) Rok Jark	6–4, 7–5
Loss	2–1	Dec 2006	Tunisia F7, Mégrine	Futures	Hard	(Tunisia) Malek Jaziri	6–4, 1–6, 4–6
Loss	2–2	Jun 2007	Bosnia and Herzegovina F4, Prijedor	Futures	Clay	(North Macedonia) Predrag Rusevski	3–6, 4–6
Loss	2–3	Jun 2008	Slovenia F3, Koper	Futures	Clay	(Slovenia) Grega Žemlja	6–2, 1–6, 2–6
Loss	2–4	May 2009	Sanremo, Italy	Challenger	Clay	(South Africa) Kevin Anderson	6–2, 2–6, 5–7
Loss	2–5	May 2009	Busan, South Korea	Challenger	Hard	(Thailand) Danai Udomchoke	2–6, 2–6
Win	3–5	May 2009	Alessandria, Italy	Challenger	Clay	(United States) Jesse Levine	7–5, 6–3
Win	4–5	Jun 2009	Constanța, Romania	Challenger	Clay	(Germany) Julian Reister	3–6, 6–3, 6–4
Loss	4–6	Jul 2009	Rijeka, Croatia	Challenger	Clay	(Italy) Paolo Lorenzi	3–6, 6–7^{(2–7)}
Win	5–6	Aug 2010	Qarshi, Uzbekistan	Challenger	Hard	(New Zealand) Michael Venus	7–6^{(8–6)}, 7–6^{(7–5)}
Win	6–6	Sep 2010	Rijeka, Croatia	Challenger	Clay	(Spain) Rubén Ramírez Hidalgo	6–4, 3–6, 7–6^{(7–5)}
Win	7–6	Sep 2010	Ljubljana, Slovenia	Challenger	Clay	(Belgium) David Goffin	6–2, 4–6, 7–5
Loss	7–7	Aug 2011	Qarshi, Uzbekistan	Challenger	Hard	(Uzbekistan) Denis Istomin	3–6, 6–1, 1–6
Win	8–7	Sep 2011	Banja Luka, Bosnia and Herzegovina	Challenger	Clay	(Spain) Pere Riba	6–4, 6–1
Loss	8–8	Mar 2012	Florianópolis, Brazil	Challenger	Clay	(Italy) Simone Bolelli	3–6, 4–6
Win	9–8	Apr 2012	São Paulo, Brazil	Challenger	Clay	(Brazil) Júlio Silva	6–3, 7–5
Win	10–8	Jun 2012	Fürth, Germany	Challenger	Clay	(Ukraine) Sergiy Stakhovsky	6–3, 2–6, 6–2
Win	11–8	Sep 2013	Bangkok, Thailand	Challenger	Hard	(South Korea) Suk-Young Jeong	6–3, 6–1
Win	12–8	Jun 2014	Fergana, Uzbekistan	Challenger	Hard	(Russia) Alexander Kudryavtsev	6–4, 7–6^{(10–8)}
Win	13–8	Jun 2014	Tianjin, China	Challenger	Hard	(Russia) Alexander Kudryavtsev	6–2, 3–6, 7–5
Loss	13–9	Jun 2014	Nanchang, China	Challenger	Hard	(Japan) Go Soeda	3–6, 6–2, 6–7^{(3–7)}
Win	14–9	Jul 2014	Portorož, Slovenia	Challenger	Hard	(Luxembourg) Gilles Müller	7–5, 6–7^{(4–7)}, 6–1
Win	15–9	Mar 2015	Shenzhen, China	Challenger	Hard	(Brazil) André Ghem	7–5, 6–4
Loss	15–10	Apr 2015	Batman, Turkey	Challenger	Hard	(Israel) Dudi Sela	7–6^{(7–5)}, 3–6, 3–6
Loss	15–11	Jul 2016	Winnipeg, Canada	Challenger	Hard	(Japan) Go Soeda	7–6^{(7–4)}, 4–6, 2–6
Win	16–11	Sep 2016	Bangkok, Thailand	Challenger	Hard	(Japan) Go Soeda	6–0, 1–0 ret.
Loss	16–12	Jan 2017	Bangkok, Thailand	Challenger	Hard	(Serbia) Janko Tipsarević	3–6, 6–7^{(1–7)}
Loss	16–13	Feb 2017	Kyoto, Japan	Challenger	Hard	(Japan) Yasutaka Uchiyama	3–6, 4–6
Loss	16–14	Mar 2017	Shenzhen, China	Challenger	Hard	(Japan) Yūichi Sugita	6–7^{(6–8)}, 4–6
Win	17–14	Jul 2017	Winnipeg, Canada	Challenger	Hard	(Canada) Peter Polansky	7–5, 3–6, 7–5
Win	18–14	Jul 2017	Granby, Canada	Challenger	Hard	(Canada) Peter Polansky	6–3, 2–6, 7–5
Win	19–14	Sep 2018	Shanghai, China	Challenger	Hard	(Japan) Hiroki Moriya	6–1, 7–6^{(7–1)}
Loss	19–15	Nov 2018	Shenzhen, China	Challenger	Hard	(Serbia) Miomir Kecmanović	2–6, 6–2, 3–6
Loss	19–16	Oct 2020	Biella, Italy	Challenger	Clay	(Argentina) Facundo Bagnis	7–6^{(7–4)}, 4–6 ret.
Loss	19–17	Apr 2021	Split, Croatia	Challenger	Clay	(Slovenia) Blaž Rola	6–2, 3–6, 2–6

=== Doubles: 16 (6–10) ===
Legend (doubles) ATP Challenger Tour (3–6) ITF Futures Tour (3–4)	Finals by surface Hard (2–4) Clay (4–6) Grass (0–0)

Result	W–L	Date	Tournament	Tier	Surface	Partner	Opponents	Score
Win	1–0	Nov 2005	Tunisia F4, Sfax	Futures	Hard	(Slovenia) Rok Jarc	(Croatia) Gordan Peranec (Spain) Carlos Rexach-Itoiz	7–6^{(10–8)}, 6–1
Loss	1–1	Oct 2006	Portugal F4, Albufeira	Futures	Hard	(Slovenia) Grega Žemlja	(Croatia) Vjekoslav Skenderovic (Croatia) Joško Topić	3–6, 0–6
Loss	1–2	Apr 2007	Croatia F5, Rovinj	Futures	Clay	(Czech Republic) Jaroslav Pospíšil	(Croatia) Nikola Martinovic (Croatia) Joško Topić	3–6, 3–6
Loss	1–3	Apr 2007	Italy F11, Padua	Futures	Clay	(Slovenia) Grega Žemlja	(Argentina) Alejandro Fabbri (Spain) Gabriel Trujillo Soler	6–7^{(5–7)}, 2–6
Loss	1–4	May 2007	Bosnia and Herzegovina F3, Brčko	Futures	Clay	(Sweden) Daniel Danilović	(North Macedonia) Lazar Magdinchev (North Macedonia) Predrag Rusevski	4–6, 2–6
Win	2–4	Jun 2007	Slovenia F2, Maribor	Futures	Clay	(Slovenia) Luka Ocvirk	(Croatia) Ante Nakic-Alfirevic (Croatia) Antonio Veić	6–3, 6–0
Win	3–4	Sep 2007	Bosnia and Herzegovina F5, Mostar	Futures	Clay	(Czech Republic) Jaroslav Pospíšil	(Netherlands) Matwé Middelkoop (Italy) Francesco Piccari	4–6, 6–3, [10–5]
Win	4–4	Mar 2012	Florianópolis, Brazil	Challenger	Clay	(Croatia) Antonio Velc	(Spain) Javier Martí (Portugal) Leonardo Tavares	6–3, 6–3
Loss	4–5	Apr 2012	Blumenau, Brazil	Challenger	Clay	(Croatia) Antonio Velc	(Croatia) Marin Draganja (Croatia) Dino Marcan	2–6, 0–6
Loss	4–6	Nov 2012	Montevideo, Uruguay	Challenger	Clay	(Croatia) Franko Škugor	(Croatia) Nikola Mektić (Croatia) Antonio Velc	2–6, 7–5, [7–10]
Win	5–6	Oct 2015	Sacramento, USA	Challenger	Hard	(Slovenia) Grega Žemlja	(Germany) Daniel Brands (Germany) Dustin Brown	6–1, 3–6, [10–3]
Loss	5–7	Feb 2017	Budapest, Hungary	Challenger	Hard	(Croatia) Franko Škugor	(Croatia) Dino Marcan (Austria) Tristan-Samuel Weissborn	3–6, 6–3, [14–16]
Loss	5–8	Apr 2017	Anning, China	Challenger	Clay	(Australia) Steven de Waard	(Croatia) Dino Marcan (Austria) Tristan-Samuel Weissborn	7–5, 3–6, [7–10]
Loss	5–9	Nov 2019	Charlottesville, USA	Challenger	Hard	(United States) Sekou Bangoura	(United States) Mitchell Krueger (Slovenia) Blaž Rola	4–6, 2–6
Win	6–9	Mar 2021	Zadar, Croatia	Challenger	Clay	(Slovenia) Blaž Rola	(Slovakia) Lukáš Klein (Slovakia) Alex Molčan	2–6, 6–2, [10–3]
Loss	6–10	Aug 2026	Kingston, Jamaica	Challenger	Hard	(Australia) Max Purcell	(France) Arthur Reymond (France) Luca Sanchez	4–6, 6–2, [10–12]

== Singles performance timeline ==
Key
W	F	SF	QF	#R	RR	Q#	DNQ	A	NH

(W) winner; (F) finalist; (SF) semifinalist; (QF) quarterfinalist; (#R) rounds 4, 3, 2, 1; (RR) round-robin stage; (Q#) qualification round; (DNQ) did not qualify; (A) absent; (NH) not held; (SR) strike rate (events won / competed); (W–L) win–loss record.
To avoid confusion and double counting, these charts are updated at the conclusion of a tournament or when the player's participation has ended.

Tournament	2009	2010	2011	2012	2013	2014	2015	2016	2017	2018	2019	2020	2021	SR	W–L	Win%
Grand Slam tournaments
Australian Open	Q2	1R	2R	2R	3R	2R	1R	A	Q2	1R	A	Q2	A	0 / 7	5–7	42%
French Open	A	2R	2R	2R	2R	Q2	1R	A	Q2	Q1	A	Q1	Q2	0 / 5	4–5	44%
Wimbledon	Q3	1R	1R	1R	1R	A	2R	Q1	Q1	A	Q2	NH	Q1	0 / 5	1–5	17%
US Open	Q3	A	1R	1R	Q2	3R*	A	Q2	1R	A	Q2	A	Q1	0 / 4	2–3	40%
Win–loss	0–0	1–3	2–4	2–4	3–3	3–1	1–3	0–0	0–1	0–1	0–0	0–0	0–0	0 / 21	12–20	38%
ATP Tour Masters 1000
Miami Open	A	A	1R	A	1R	A	A	A	A	A	A	NH	A	0 / 2	0–2	0%
Monte-Carlo Masters	A	A	A	A	Q2	A	A	A	A	A	A	NH	A	0 / 0	0–0	–
Italian Open	A	A	Q2	1R	Q2	A	Q1	A	A	A	A	A	A	0 / 1	0–1	0%
Win–loss	0–0	0–0	0–1	0–1	0–1	0–0	0–0	0–0	0–0	0–0	0–0	0–0	0–0	0 / 3	0–3	0%
Olympic Games
Summer Olympics	Not Held			2R	Not Held			A	NH				A	0 / 1	1–1	50%
Career statistics
Overall win–loss	3–2	7–8	13–18	6–15	11–15	7–7	3–10	0–0	1–2	2–8	0–0	0–1	0–0	0 / 90	57–89	39%
Year-end ranking	125	112	92	92	102	105	151	217	97	206	345	269	293	N/A		

== Davis Cup ==
=== Singles performances (17–9) ===
Edition	Round	Date	Against	Surface	Opponent	Result	Outcome
2006 Europe/Africa Zone Group II	1R	7-Apr-2006	Algeria	Clay	Rachid Baba-Aisa	6–0, 6–1	Win
2008 Europe/Africa Zone Group II	1R	11-Apr-2008	Cyprus	Hard	Marcos Baghdatis	4–6, 3–6, 4–6	Lose
2008 Europe/Africa Zone Group II	1R	13-Apr-2008	Cyprus	Hard	Photos Kallias	6–1, 6–1	Win
2008 Europe/Africa Zone Group II	RPO	20-Jul-2008	Tunisia	Clay	Haithem Abid	6–3, 3–6, 3–6, 7–5, 6–2	Win
2009 Europe/Africa Zone Group II	1R	6-Mar-2009	Egypt	Carpet	Karim Maamoun	6–0, 6–2, 6–2	Win
2009 Europe/Africa Zone Group II	1R	8-Mar-2009	Egypt	Carpet	Mahmoud Ezz	3–6, 7–6^{(7–5)}, 6–4	Win
2009 Europe/Africa Zone Group II	QF	10-Jul-2009	Lithuania	Clay	Gvidas Sabeckis	6–2, 6–3, 6–1	Win
2009 Europe/Africa Zone Group II	SF	20-Sep-2009	Latvia	Carpet	Andis Juška	3–6, 4–6, 2–6	Lose
2010 Europe/Africa Zone Group II	1R	5-Mar-2010	Norway	Hard	Stian Boretti	6–2, 6–4, 6–2	Win
2010 Europe/Africa Zone Group II	QF	9-Jul-2010	Bulgaria	Clay	Grigor Dimitrov	1–6, 6–1, 6–0, 6–3	Win
2010 Europe/Africa Zone Group II	QF	11-Jul-2010	Bulgaria	Clay	Todor Enev	6–2, 6–1	Win
2010 Europe/Africa Zone Group II	SF	17-Sep-2010	Lithuania	Hard	Ričardas Berankis	6–3, 2–6, 6–7^{(9–11)}, 4–6	Lose
2010 Europe/Africa Zone Group II	SF	19-Sep-2010	Lithuania	Hard	Laurynas Grigelis	6–4, 7–6^{(7–4)}, 7–6^{(7–5)}	Win
2011 Europe/Africa Zone Group I	1R	4-Mar-2011	Finland	Clay	Harri Heliövaara	4–6, 6–2, 6–3, 6–4	Win
2011 Europe/Africa Zone Group I	1R	6-Mar-2011	Finland	Clay	Jarkko Nieminen	3–6, 4–6, 6–4, 4–6	Lose
2011 Europe/Africa Zone Group I	2R	8-Jul-2011	Italy	Clay	Potito Starace	6–3, 3–6, 2–6, 4–6	Lose
2012 Europe/Africa Zone Group I	1R	10-Feb-2012	Denmark	Hard	Frederik Nielsen	6–2, 6–4, 6–4	Win
2012 Europe/Africa Zone Group I	2R	6-Apr-2012	South Africa	Hard	Ruan Roalofse	6–7^{(5–7)}, 6–1, 6–1, 6–3	Win
2012 Europe/Africa Zone Group I	2R	8-Apr-2012	South Africa	Hard	Izak van der Merwe	6–7^{(3–7)}, 4–6, 4–6	Lose
2013 Europe/Africa Zone Group I	1R	1-Feb-2013	Poland	Hard (I)	Jerzy Janowicz	3–6, 3–6, 5–7	Lose
2013 Europe/Africa Zone Group I	PO	13-Sep-2013	South Africa	Clay	Ruan Roalofse	6–1, 6–3, 6–4	Win
2014 Europe/Africa Zone Group I	1R	31-Jan-2014	Portugal	Hard (I)	Gastão Elias	7–6^{(16–14)}, 6–1, 6–4	Win
2014 Europe/Africa Zone Group I	1R	2-Feb-2014	Portugal	Hard (I)	João Sousa	7–5, 7–5, 6–2	Win
2014 Europe/Africa Zone Group I	2R	4-Apr-2014	Israel	Clay	Amir Weintraub	6–4, 5–7, 3–6, 6–3, 4–6	Lose
2017 Europe/Africa Zone Group II	1R	5-Feb-2017	Monaco	Hard	Lucas Catarina	6–4, 2–6, 6–2, 6–4	Win
2020 World Group I Play-offs	RPO	7-Mar-2020	Pakistan	Grass	Aqeel Khan	6–0, 6–7^{(6–8)}, 4–6	Lose

=== Doubles performances (5–4) ===
Edition	Round	Date	Partnering	Against	Surface	Opponent	Result	Outcome
2011 Europe/Africa Zone Group I	2R	9-Jul-2011	Grega Žemlja	Italy	Clay	Potito Starace; Daniele Bracciali	6–7^{(3–7)}, 6–7^{(4–7)}, 2–6	Lose
2012 Europe/Africa Zone Group I	1R	11-Feb-2012	Grega Žemlja	Denmark	Hard	Thomas Kromann; Frederik Nielsen	6–4, 6–7^{(7–5)}, 6–4, 7–5	Win
2012 Europe/Africa Zone Group I	2R	7-Apr-2012	Grega Žemlja	South Africa	Hard	Raven Klaasen; Izak van der Merwe	7–6^{(7–5)}, 6–7^{(4–7)}, 1–6, 4–6	Lose
2013 Europe/Africa Zone Group I	1R	2-Feb-2013	Grega Žemlja	Poland	Hard (I)	Mariusz Fyrstenberg; Marcin Matkowski	6–3, 2–6, 6–2, 4–6, 13–11	Win
2013 Europe/Africa Zone Group I	PO	13-Sep-2013	Blaž Rola	South Africa	Clay	Raven Klaasen; Nikala Scholtz	7–5, 6–1, 7–6^{(7–4)}	Win
2014 Europe/Africa Zone Group I	1R	1-Feb-2014	Grega Žemlja	Portugal	Hard (I)	Gastão Elias; João Sousa	6–3, 7–5, 7–6^{(7–5)}	Win
2015 Europe/Africa Zone Group I	RPO	1-Nov-2015	Blaž Rola	Lithuania	Hard (I)	Laurynas Grigelis; Lukas Mugevicius	6–4, 7–6^{(7–1)}, 6–4	Win
2017 Europe/Africa Zone Group II	1R	5-Feb-2017	Grega Žemlja	Monaco	Hard	Romain Arneodo; Benjamin Balleret	2–6, 4–6, 3–6	Lose
2020 World Group I Play-offs	RPO	7-Mar-2020	Tom Kočevar-Dešman	Pakistan	Grass	Aqeel Khan; Aisam Qureshi	3–6, 6–7^{(7–9)}	Lose
