= 2014 All Japan Indoor Tennis Championships – Doubles =

Doubles
- 2014 All Japan Indoor Tennis Championships

Final
- Champion: (India) Purav Raja (India) Divij Sharan
- Runner-up: (Thailand) Sanchai Ratiwatana (New Zealand) Michael Venus
- Score: 5–7, 7–6^{(7–3)}, [10–4]

Events
Singles	Doubles
← 2013 ·	All Japan Indoor Tennis Championships	· 2015 →

Purav Raja and Divij Sharan were the defending champions and successfully defended their title, defeating Sanchai Ratiwatana and Michael Venus in the final, 5–7, 7–6^{(7–3)}, [10–4].

== Seeds ==
1. (India) Purav Raja / (India) Divij Sharan (champions)
2. (Thailand) Sanchai Ratiwatana / (New Zealand) Michael Venus (final)
3. (Chinese Taipei) Peng Hsien-yin / (Chinese Taipei) Yang Tsung-hua (semifinals)
4. (Japan) Toshihide Matsui / (Thailand) Danai Udomchoke (semifinals)

== Draw ==
=== Key ===
- Q = Qualifier
- WC = Wild card
- LL = Lucky loser
- Alt = Alternate
- SE = Special exempt
- PR = Protected ranking
- ITF = ITF entry
- JE = Junior exempt
- w/o = Walkover
- r = Retired
- d = Defaulted
- SR = Special ranking

=== Draw ===
First round
1	(India) P Raja (India) D Sharan	6	6
(Chinese Taipei) L-c Huang (Japan) H Moriya	3	4
(Germany) R Becker (Italy) G Quinzi
(Japan) T Ito (Japan) H Kondo	w/o
4	(Japan) T Matsui (Thailand) D Udomchoke	7^{8}	7^{7}
WC	(Japan) Y Nishioka (Japan) Takashi Saito	6^{6}	6^{5}
WC	(Japan) Sho Katayama (Japan) Bumpei Sato	2	0
(Japan) Arata Onozawa (Japan) Y Sugita	6	6
WC	(Japan) Hiroyasu Ehara (Japan) K Takeuchi	6	6
(France) Jules Marie (Czech Republic) Michal Schmid	3	3
(Japan) G Soeda (Japan) Y Uchiyama	7^{7}	4	[8]
3	(Chinese Taipei) H-y Peng (Chinese Taipei) T-h Yang	6^{2}	6	[10]
(Germany) A Beck (Austria) M Fischer	6	6
(Japan) Y Ito (Japan) Shuichi Sekiguchi	4	4
(Chinese Taipei) H-h Lee (Chinese Taipei) C-f Wang
2	(Thailand) Sa Ratiwatana (New Zealand) M Venus	w/o

Quarterfinals
1	(India) P Raja (India) D Sharan	6^{7}	6	[10]
(Japan) T Ito (Japan) H Kondo	7^{9}	3	[6]
4	(Japan) T Matsui (Thailand) D Udomchoke	7	6
(Japan) A Onozawa (Japan) Y Sugita	5	3
WC	(Japan) H Ehara (Japan) K Takeuchi	7^{8}	4	[5]
3	(Chinese Taipei) H-y Peng (Chinese Taipei) T-h Yang	6^{6}	6	[10]
(Germany) A Beck (Austria) M Fischer	5	6	[5]
2	(Thailand) Sa Ratiwatana (New Zealand) M Venus	7	2	[10]

Semifinals
1	(India) P Raja (India) D Sharan	7^{7}	7
4	(Japan) T Matsui (Thailand) D Udomchoke	6^{4}	5
3	(Chinese Taipei) H-y Peng (Chinese Taipei) T-h Yang	0	2
2	(Thailand) Sa Ratiwatana (New Zealand) M Venus	6	6

Final
1	(India) P Raja (India) D Sharan	5	7^{7}	[10]
2	(Thailand) Sa Ratiwatana (New Zealand) M Venus	7	6^{3}	[4]
