= 2013 All Japan Indoor Tennis Championships – Doubles =

Doubles
- 2013 All Japan Indoor Tennis Championships

Final
- Champions: (India) Purav Raja (India) Divij Sharan
- Runners-up: (Australia) Chris Guccione (Australia) Matt Reid
- Score: 6–4, 7–5

Events
Singles	Doubles
← 2012 ·	All Japan Indoor Tennis Championships	· 2014 →

Sanchai Ratiwatana and Sonchat Ratiwatana were the defending champions but decided not to participate.
Purav Raja and Divij Sharan defeated Chris Guccione and Matt Reid 6–4, 7–5 in the final, to win the title.

== Seeds ==
1. (India) Purav Raja / (India) Divij Sharan (champions)
2. (Australia) Chris Guccione / (Australia) Matt Reid (final)
3. (New Zealand) Artem Sitak / (New Zealand) Jose Statham (quarterfinals)
4. (Chinese Taipei) Hsieh Cheng-peng / (Chinese Taipei) Yang Tsung-hua (quarterfinals)

== Draw ==
=== Key ===
- Q = Qualifier
- WC = Wild card
- LL = Lucky loser
- Alt = Alternate
- SE = Special exempt
- PR = Protected ranking
- ITF = ITF entry
- JE = Junior exempt
- w/o = Walkover
- r = Retired
- d = Defaulted
- SR = Special ranking

=== Draw ===
First round
1	(India) P Raja (India) D Sharan	6	6
(Chinese Taipei) L-c Huang (South Korea) S-y Jeong	1	3
Alt	(Japan) Y Ito (Japan) T Niki	7^{7}	7^{10}
WC	(Japan) K Takeuchi (Japan) K Uchida	6^{4}	6^{8}
3	(New Zealand) A Sitak (New Zealand) J Statham	6	6
WC	(Japan) Sho Katayama (Japan) Bumpei Sato	3	4
(Germany) P Gojowczyk (Poland) M Przysiężny	5	6	[6]
(Italy) A Arnaboldi (Germany) D Meffert	7	4	[10]
(Australia) M Barton (Australia) J Millman	6	6
(Australia) S Groth (Japan) T Matsui	3	4
(Australia) J Duckworth (Australia) G Jones
4	(Chinese Taipei) C-p Hsieh (Chinese Taipei) T-h Yang	w/o
(India) Y Bhambri (Japan) Y Uchiyama	6	7^{7}
Alt	(Japan) Hiroyasu Ehara (Japan) Shuichi Sekiguchi	2	6^{3}
WC	(Japan) H Kondo (Japan) H Moriya	3	6^{9}
2	(Australia) C Guccione (Australia) M Reid	6	7^{11}

Quarterfinals
1	(India) P Raja (India) D Sharan	6	6
Alt	(Japan) Y Ito (Japan) T Niki	3	3
3	(New Zealand) A Sitak (New Zealand) J Statham	2	6^{3}
(Italy) A Arnaboldi (Germany) D Meffert	6	7^{7}
(Australia) M Barton (Australia) J Millman	7^{7}	7^{7}
4	(Chinese Taipei) C-p Hsieh (Chinese Taipei) T-h Yang	6^{0}	6^{3}
(India) Y Bhambri (Japan) Y Uchiyama	6^{2}	6^{7}
2	(Australia) C Guccione (Australia) M Reid	7^{7}	7^{9}

Semifinals
1	(India) P Raja (India) D Sharan	7^{7}	6
(Italy) A Arnaboldi (Germany) D Meffert	6^{4}	4
(Australia) M Barton (Australia) J Millman	6^{4}	4
2	(Australia) C Guccione (Australia) M Reid	7^{7}	6

Final
1	(India) P Raja (India) D Sharan	6	7
2	(Australia) C Guccione (Australia) M Reid	4	5
