= 2014 All Japan Indoor Tennis Championships – Singles =

Singles
- 2014 All Japan Indoor Tennis Championships

Final
- Champion: (Austria) Martin Fischer
- Runner-up: (Japan) Tatsuma Ito
- Score: 3–6, 7–5, 6–4

Events
| Singles | Doubles |
| ← 2013 · | All Japan Indoor Tennis Championships | · 2015 → |

John Millman was the defending champion but decided not to participate.

Martin Fischer won the title, defeating Tatsuma Ito in the final, 3–6, 7–5, 6–4

== Seeds ==
1. (Japan) Go Soeda (semifinals)
2. (Lithuania) Ričardas Berankis (quarterfinals)
3. (Japan) Tatsuma Ito (final)
4. (Japan) Yūichi Sugita (first round)
5. (Japan) Hiroki Moriya (quarterfinals)
6. (Switzerland) Marco Chiudinelli (semifinals)
7. (Germany) Andreas Beck (quarterfinals)
8. (Austria) Martin Fischer (champion)

== Draw ==
=== Key ===
- Q = Qualifier
- WC = Wild card
- LL = Lucky loser
- Alt = Alternate
- SE = Special exempt
- PR = Protected ranking
- ITF = ITF entry
- JE = Junior exempt
- w/o = Walkover
- r = Retired
- d = Defaulted
- SR = Special ranking

=== Finals ===
Semifinals
1 | (Japan) Go Soeda | 6^{4} | 6^{2}
3 | (Japan) Tatsuma Ito | 7^{7} | 7^{7}
8 | (Austria) Martin Fischer | 6 | 1 | 6
6 | (Switzerland) Marco Chiudinelli | 4 | 6 | 1

Final
3 | (Japan) Tatsuma Ito | 6 | 5 | 4
8 | (Austria) Martin Fischer | 3 | 7 | 6

=== Top half ===
First round
1 | (Japan) G Soeda | 6 | 6
(China) D Wu | 3 | 2
(France) Jules Marie | 6 | 6
(Chinese Taipei) T-h Yang | 4 | 1
Q | (Japan) Arata Onozawa | 6 | 7^{7}
(Japan) Y Uchiyama | 4 | 6^{4}
(Japan) Y Ito | 7^{7} | 4 | 3
5 | (Japan) H Moriya | 6^{4} | 6 | 6
3 | (Japan) T Ito | 6 | 7^{7}
LL | (Japan) T Matsui | 4 | 6^{1}
Q | (Chinese Taipei) C-f Wang | 4 | 6 | 6
WC | (Japan) T Niki | 6 | 3 | 2
(Italy) G Quinzi | 0 | 2
(Germany) R Becker | 6 | 6
WC | (Japan) K Takeuchi | 3 | 4
7 | (Germany) A Beck | 6 | 6

Second round
1 | (Japan) G Soeda | 6 | 5 | 6
(France) J Marie | 2 | 7 | 4
Q | (Japan) A Onozawa | 6 | 0 | 2
5 | (Japan) H Moriya | 4 | 6 | 6
3 | (Japan) T Ito | 6 | 7
(Chinese Taipei) C-f Wang | 1 | 5
(Germany) R Becker | 6^{6} | 6^{2}
7 | (Germany) A Beck | 7^{8} | 7^{7}

Quarterfinals
1 | (Japan) G Soeda | 6 | 6
5 | (Japan) H Moriya | 4 | 3
3 | (Japan) T Ito | 6 | 6
7 | (Germany) A Beck | 2 | 4

Semifinals
1 | (Japan) G Soeda | 6^{4} | 6^{2}
3 | (Japan) T Ito | 7^{7} | 7^{7}

=== Bottom half ===
First round
8 | (Austria) M Fischer | 7 | 7^{7}
(New Zealand) M Venus | 5 | 6^{3}
(Japan) Y Nishioka | 1 | 4
(Germany) M Bachinger | 6 | 6
Q | (Japan) Yuuya Kibi | 6 | 6
Q | (Chinese Taipei) H-y Peng | 1 | 0
(Chinese Taipei) L-c Huang | 7 | 6
4 | (Japan) Y Sugita | 5 | 3
6 | (Switzerland) M Chiudinelli | 3 | 6 | 6
(Japan) Shuichi Sekiguchi | 6 | 4 | 2
WC | (Japan) Takashi Saito | 4 | 4
(Japan) H Kondo | 6 | 6
WC | (Japan) Hiroyasu Ehara | 4 | 4
(United States) J Jung | 6 | 6
(Czech Republic) Michal Schmid | 3 | 7^{8} | 5
2 | (Lithuania) R Berankis | 6 | 6^{6} | 7

Second round
8 | (Austria) M Fischer | 6 | 7^{7}
(Germany) M Bachinger | 4 | 6^{2}
Q | (Japan) Y Kibi | 6 | 6
(Chinese Taipei) L-c Huang | 3 | 0
6 | (Switzerland) M Chiudinelli | 6 | 6
(Japan) H Kondo | 3 | 3
(United States) J Jung | 5 | 6 | 1
2 | (Lithuania) R Berankis | 7 | 2 | 6

Quarterfinals
8 | (Austria) M Fischer | 6 | 6
Q | (Japan) Y Kibi | 4 | 1
6 | (Switzerland) M Chiudinelli | 6^{3} | 6 | 6
2 | (Lithuania) R Berankis | 7^{7} | 4 | 4

Semifinals
8 | (Austria) M Fischer | 6 | 1 | 6
6 | (Switzerland) M Chiudinelli | 4 | 6 | 1
