= 2010 Shimadzu All Japan Indoor Tennis Championships – Doubles =

Doubles
- 2010 Shimadzu All Japan Indoor Tennis Championships

Final
- Champions: (Austria) Martin Fischer (Austria) Philipp Oswald
- Runners-up: (India) Divij Sharan (India) Vishnu Vardhan
- Score: 6–1, 6–2

Events
Singles	Doubles
← 2009 ·	Shimadzu All Japan Indoor Tennis Championships	· 2011 →

Aisam-ul-Haq Qureshi and Martin Slanar were the defending champions, but they didn't participate this year.

== Seeds ==
1. (Australia) Rameez Junaid / (Australia) Joseph Sirianni (first round)
2. (Austria) Martin Fischer / (Austria) Philipp Oswald (champions)
3. (Australia) Sadik Kadir / (India) Purav Raja (quarterfinals)
4. (Chinese Taipei) Lee Hsin-han / (Chinese Taipei) Yang Tsung-hua (first round)

== Draw ==
=== Key ===
- Q = Qualifier
- WC = Wild card
- LL = Lucky loser
- Alt = Alternate
- SE = Special exempt
- PR = Protected ranking
- ITF = ITF entry
- JE = Junior exempt
- w/o = Walkover
- r = Retired
- d = Defaulted
- SR = Special ranking

=== Draw ===
First round
1	(Australia) R Junaid (Australia) J Sirianni	2	2
(Australia) G Jones (New Zealand) J Statham	6	6
(India) D Sharan (India) V Vardhan	6	6
WC	(Japan) T Iwami (Japan) K Takeuchi	4	2
3	(Australia) S Kadir (India) P Raja	6	6
(Japan) Y Ito (Japan) Y Sugita	3	4
(Japan) J Mitsuhashi (Japan) T Suzuki	6	6
(Germany) A Begemann (Poland) M Przysiężny	3	3
(Germany) S Rieschick (Germany) S Stadler	6	6
(Japan) H Kondo (Japan) G Soeda	4	3
(Australia) M Ebden (New Zealand) D King-Turner	7	6
4	(Chinese Taipei) H-h Lee (Chinese Taipei) T-h Yang	6^{4}	4
Q	(Australia) B Klein (Russia) V Rudnev	6^{3}	7	[4]
WC	(Japan) T Ito (Japan) T Matsui	7	6^{3}	[10]
WC	(Japan) H Moriya (Japan) H Sato	2	3
2	(Austria) M Fischer (Austria) P Oswald	6	6

Quarterfinals
(Australia) G Jones (New Zealand) J Statham	1	2
(India) D Sharan (India) V Vardhan	6	6
3	(Australia) S Kadir (India) P Raja	5	6^{2}
(Japan) J Mitsuhashi (Japan) T Suzuki	7	7
(Germany) S Rieschick (Germany) S Stadler	3	4
(Australia) M Ebden (New Zealand) D King-Turner	6	6
WC	(Japan) T Ito (Japan) T Matsui	6^{4}	3
2	(Austria) M Fischer (Austria) P Oswald	7	6

Semifinals
(India) D Sharan (India) V Vardhan	7	7
(Japan) J Mitsuhashi (Japan) T Suzuki	6^{7}	6^{5}
(Australia) M Ebden (New Zealand) D King-Turner	4	3
2	(Austria) M Fischer (Austria) P Oswald	6	6

Finals
(India) D Sharan (India) V Vardhan	1	2
2	(Austria) M Fischer (Austria) P Oswald	6	6
