= 2012 All Japan Indoor Tennis Championships – Doubles =

Doubles
- 2012 All Japan Indoor Tennis Championships

Final
- Champions: (Thailand) Sanchai Ratiwatana (Thailand) Sonchat Ratiwatana
- Runners-up: (Chinese Taipei) Hsieh Cheng-peng (Chinese Taipei) Lee Hsin-han
- Score: 7–6^{(9–7)}, 6–3

Events
Singles	Doubles
← 2011 ·	All Japan Indoor Tennis Championships	· 2013 →

Dominik Meffert and Simon Stadler were the defending champions but decided not to participate.
Sanchai Ratiwatana and Sonchat Ratiwatana won the title, defeating Hsieh Cheng-peng and Lee Hsin-han 7–6^{(9–7)}, 6–3 in the final.

== Seeds ==
1. (United States) John Paul Fruttero / (South Africa) Raven Klaasen (quarterfinals)
2. (Thailand) Sanchai Ratiwatana / (Thailand) Sonchat Ratiwatana (champions)
3. (Finland) Harri Heliövaara / (Ukraine) Denys Molchanov (semifinals)
4. (India) Divij Sharan / (India) Vishnu Vardhan (first round)

== Draw ==
=== Key ===
- Q = Qualifier
- WC = Wild card
- LL = Lucky loser
- Alt = Alternate
- SE = Special exempt
- PR = Protected ranking
- ITF = ITF entry
- JE = Junior exempt
- w/o = Walkover
- r = Retired
- d = Defaulted
- SR = Special ranking

=== Draw ===
First round
1	(United States) JP Fruttero (South Africa) R Klaasen	6	7^{7}
(China) L Zhe (Chinese Taipei) T-h Yang	4	6^{4}
(Tunisia) M Jaziri (India) P Raja	6	7
(Australia) C Ebelthite (Australia) S Groth	3	5
4	(India) D Sharan (India) V Vardhan	2	6^{6}
WC	(Japan) H Moriya (Japan) Y Sugita	6	7^{8}
(Slovakia) K Čapkovič (Israel) A Weintraub	4	3
(Chinese Taipei) C-p Hsieh (Chinese Taipei) H-h Lee	6	6
Q	(Japan) T Niki (Japan) B Sato	2	2
LL	(India) Y Bhambri (Chinese Taipei) T Chen	6	6
WC	(Japan) T Ito (Japan) Y Uchiyama	1	3
3	(Finland) H Heliövaara (Ukraine) D Molchanov	6	6
(Japan) H Kondo (Chinese Taipei) Y Chu-huan	4	7^{12}	[7]
(Germany) S Rieschick (Thailand) D Udomchoke	6	6^{10}	[10]
(Italy) R Ghedin (Australia) B Klein	3	7^{7}	[4]
2	(Thailand) Sa Ratiwatana (Thailand) So Ratiwatana	6	6^{4}	[10]

Quarterfinals
1	(United States) JP Fruttero (South Africa) R Klaasen	7	6^{3}	[6]
(Tunisia) M Jaziri (India) P Raja	5	7^{7}	[10]
WC	(Japan) H Hiroki Moriya (Japan) Y Sugita	3	4
(Chinese Taipei) C-p Hsieh (Chinese Taipei) H-h Lee	6	6
LL	(India) Y Bhambri (Chinese Taipei) T Chen	0	1
3	(Finland) H Heliövaara (Ukraine) D Molchanov	6	6
(Germany) S Rieschick (Thailand) D Udomchoke	2	4
2	(Thailand) Sa Ratiwatana (Thailand) So Ratiwatana	6	6

Semifinals
(Tunisia) M Jaziri (India) P Raja	3	6	[7]
(Chinese Taipei) C-p Hsieh (Chinese Taipei) H-h Lee	6	3	[10]
3	(Finland) H Heliövaara (Ukraine) D Molchanov	6^{4}	3
2	(Thailand) Sa Ratiwatana (Thailand) So Ratiwatana	7^{7}	6

Final
(Chinese Taipei) C-p Hsieh (Chinese Taipei) H-h Lee	6^{7}	3
2	(Thailand) Sa Ratiwatana (Thailand) So Ratiwatana	7^{9}	6
