= 2011 All Japan Indoor Tennis Championships – Doubles =

Doubles
- 2011 All Japan Indoor Tennis Championships

Final
- Champions: (Germany) Dominik Meffert (Germany) Simon Stadler
- Runners-up: (Germany) Andre Begemann (Australia) James Lemke
- Score: 7–5, 2–6, [10–7]

Events
| Singles | Doubles |
| ← 2010 · | All Japan Indoor Tennis Championships | · 2012 → |

Martin Fischer and Philipp Oswald were the defending champions, but Fischer chose not to participate this year.
As a result, Oswald played alongside Nikolaus Moser. They reached the quarterfinals, but lost to Andrey Kumantsov and Michael Ryderstedt.
Dominik Meffert and Simon Stadler won the title after defeating Andre Begemann and James Lemke 7–5, 2–6, [10–7].

== Seeds ==
1. (Philippines) Treat Conrad Huey / (India) Purav Raja (first round)
2. (Austria) Nikolaus Moser / (Austria) Philipp Oswald (quarterfinals)
3. (Australia) Colin Ebelthite / (Australia) Sadik Kadir (first round)
4. (Germany) Dominik Meffert / (Germany) Simon Stadler (champions)

== Draw ==
=== Key ===
- Q = Qualifier
- WC = Wild card
- LL = Lucky loser
- Alt = Alternate
- SE = Special exempt
- PR = Protected ranking
- ITF = ITF entry
- JE = Junior exempt
- w/o = Walkover
- r = Retired
- d = Defaulted
- SR = Special ranking

=== Draw ===
First round
1 | (Philippines) TC Huey (India) P Raja | 7 | 6^{6} | [6]
WC | (Japan) Y Ishii (Japan) Kento Takeuchi | 6^{2} | 7 | [10]
(United States) JP Fruttero (United States) N Monroe | 7 | 7
WC | (Japan) T Suzuki (Japan) Y Uchiyama | 6^{4} | 6^{5}
3 | (Australia) C Ebelthite (Australia) S Kadir | 4 | 4
(Germany) A Begemann (Australia) J Lemke | 6 | 6
(Chinese Taipei) H-h Lee (Chinese Taipei) T-h Yang | 2 | 6 | [10]
(Germany) S Rieschick (Thailand) D Udomchoke | 6 | 4 | [6]
WC | (Japan) Hiroki Moriya (Japan) Bumpei Sato | 3 | 4
(India) D Sharan (India) V Vardhan | 6 | 6
(Japan) T Ito (Japan) T Matsui | 2 | 1
4 | (Germany) D Meffert (Germany) S Stadler | 6 | 6
Q | (Russia) A Kumantsov (Sweden) M Ryderstedt | 3 | 7 | [10]
(Italy) T Fabbiano (Italy) G Naso | 6 | 5 | [2]
(Japan) H Kondo (Japan) G Soeda | 3 | 4
2 | (Austria) N Moser (Austria) P Oswald | 6 | 6

Quarterfinals
WC | (Japan) Y Ishii (Japan) Kento Takeuchi | 6^{4} | 6 | [7]
(United States) JP Fruttero (United States) N Monroe | 7 | 3 | [10]
(Germany) A Begemann (Australia) J Lemke | 6 | 6
(Chinese Taipei) H-h Lee (Chinese Taipei) T-h Yang | 1 | 1
(India) D Sharan (India) V Vardhan | 7 | 2 | [5]
4 | (Germany) D Meffert (Germany) S Stadler | 6^{5} | 6 | [10]
Q | (Russia) A Kumantsov (Sweden) M Ryderstedt | 7 | 7
2 | (Austria) N Moser (Austria) P Oswald | 5 | 6^{4}

Semifinals
(United States) JP Fruttero (United States) N Monroe | 4 | 6 | [10]
(Germany) A Begemann (Australia) J Lemke | 6 | 3 | [12]
4 | (Germany) D Meffert (Germany) S Stadler | 6 | 6
Q | (Russia) A Kumantsov (Sweden) M Ryderstedt | 3 | 0

Final
(Germany) A Begemann (Australia) J Lemke | 5 | 6 | [7]
4 | (Germany) D Meffert (Germany) S Stadler | 7 | 2 | [10]
