= 2016 Shimadzu All Japan Indoor Tennis Championships – Singles =

Singles
- 2016 Shimadzu All Japan Indoor Tennis Championships

Final
- Champion: (Japan) Yūichi Sugita
- Runner-up: (China) Zhang Ze
- Score: 5–7 , 6–3 , 6–4

Events
Singles	Doubles
← 2015 ·	Shimadzu All Japan Indoor Tennis Championships	· 2017 →

Michał Przysiężny is the defending champion, but chose not to defend his title .

Yuichi Sugita won the title, defeating Zhang Ze in the final 5–7, 6–3, 6–4 .

== Seeds ==
1. (Japan) Yūichi Sugita (champion)
2. (Japan) Tatsuma Ito (first round)
3. (Japan) Go Soeda (quarterfinals)
4. (Australia) Luke Saville (first round)
5. (Japan) Hiroki Moriya (second round)
6. (China) Bai Yan (second round)
7. (Chinese Taipei) Chen Ti (second round)
8. (South Korea) Lee Duck-hee (first round)

== Draw ==
=== Key ===
- Q = Qualifier
- WC = Wild card
- LL = Lucky loser
- Alt = Alternate
- SE = Special exempt
- PR = Protected ranking
- ITF = ITF entry
- JE = Junior exempt
- w/o = Walkover
- r = Retired
- d = Defaulted
- SR = Special ranking

=== Finals ===
Semifinals
1	(Japan) Yūichi Sugita	6	7
(Australia) Matthew Barton	4	5
Q	(Japan) Yuya Kibi	7^{7}	3	4
(China) Zhang Ze	6^{3}	6	6

Final
1	(Japan) Yūichi Sugita	5	6	6
(China) Zhang Ze	7	3	4

=== Top half ===
First round
1	(Japan) Y Sugita	6	6
(South Africa) T Vorster	4	2
Q	(Poland) A Kapaś	6	6
(Japan) K Takeuchi	4	4
(South Africa) L Harris	7^{9}	6
(Germany) A Beck	6^{7}	4
(Italy) F Cipolla	1	0
5	(Japan) H Moriya	6	6
3	(Japan) G Soeda	6	6
(New Zealand) F Tearney	2	2
(Italy) A Bega	3	6	6
WC	(Japan) Shintaro Imai	6	3	4
(Australia) M Barton	7^{7}	3	7^{10}
WC	(Japan) Y Uchiyama	6^{2}	6	6^{8}
(Australia) B Mitchell	7^{7}	6
8	(South Korea) D-h Lee	6^{3}	1

Second round
1	(Japan) Y Sugita	6	6
Q	(Poland) A Kapaś	3	2
(South Africa) L Harris	4	6	7^{7}
5	(Japan) H Moriya	6	3	6^{4}
3	(Japan) G Soeda	6	6
(Italy) A Bega	3	2
(Australia) M Barton	6	7^{7}
(Australia) B Mitchell	1	6^{5}

Quarterfinals
1	(Japan) Y Sugita	7	6
(South Africa) L Harris	5	3
3	(Japan) G Soeda	6	5	3
(Australia) M Barton	4	7	6

Semifinals
1	(Japan) Y Sugita	6	7
(Australia) M Barton	4	5

=== Bottom half ===
First round
7	(Chinese Taipei) T Chen	7	6
(Japan) Hiroyasu Ehara	5	0
(India) S Singh	3	6	6^{8}
Q	(Japan) Yuya Kibi	6	3	7^{10}
(Chinese Taipei) J Wang	6	6
WC	(Japan) Ken Onishi	3	2
Q	(Japan) Shuichi Sekiguchi	6	7
4/Q	(Australia) L Saville	3	5
6	(China) Y Bai	6	6
WC	(Japan) Sora Fukuda	2	2
(United States) P Kobelt	6^{4}	6	7
(France) M Janvier	7^{7}	2	5
(China) Z Li	6^{1}	3
(Japan) T Niki	7^{7}	6
(China) Z Zhang	6	1	6
2	(Japan) T Ito	4	6	2

Second round
7	(Chinese Taipei) T Chen	3	6^{5}
Q	(Japan) Y Kibi	6	7^{7}
(Chinese Taipei) J Wang	6	6
Q	(Japan) S Sekiguchi	4	4
6	(China) Y Bai	6	3	4
(United States) P Kobelt	4	6	6
(Japan) T Niki	3	1
(China) Z Zhang	6	6

Quarterfinals
Q	(Japan) Y Kibi	3	6	6
(Chinese Taipei) J Wang	6	1	2
(United States) P Kobelt	2	6^{3}
(China) Z Zhang	6	7^{7}

Semifinals
Q	(Japan) Y Kibi	7^{7}	3	4
(China) Z Zhang	6^{3}	6	6
