= 2011 All Japan Indoor Tennis Championships – Singles =

Singles
- 2011 All Japan Indoor Tennis Championships

Final
- Champion: (Germany) Dominik Meffert
- Runner-up: (Germany) Cedrik-Marcel Stebe
- Score: 4–6, 6–4, 6–2

Events
Singles	Doubles
← 2010 ·	All Japan Indoor Tennis Championships	· 2012 →

Yuichi Sugita was the defending champion after defeating Matthew Ebden in the 2010 final. He was eliminated by Cedrik-Marcel Stebe already in the first round.
Stebe reached the final, but lost to Dominik Meffert 6–4, 4–6, 2–6.

== Seeds ==
1. (Japan) Go Soeda (semifinals)
2. (Germany) Matthias Bachinger (quarterfinals)
3. (Japan) Tatsuma Ito (quarterfinals)
4. (Japan) Yuichi Sugita (first round)
5. (Germany) Dominik Meffert (champion)
6. (Germany) Sebastian Rieschick (quarterfinals)
7. (Germany) Simon Stadler (semifinals)
8. (Germany) Andre Begemann (quarterfinals)

== Draw ==
=== Key ===
- Q = Qualifier
- WC = Wild card
- LL = Lucky loser
- Alt = Alternate
- SE = Special exempt
- PR = Protected ranking
- ITF = ITF entry
- JE = Junior exempt
- w/o = Walkover
- r = Retired
- d = Defaulted
- SR = Special ranking

=== Finals ===
Semifinals
1	(Japan) Go Soeda	4	7	6^{0}
Q	(Germany) Cedrik-Marcel Stebe	6	6^{4}	7
7	(Germany) Simon Stadler	1	3
5	(Germany) Dominik Meffert	6	6

Final
Q	(Germany) Cedrik-Marcel Stebe	4	6	2
5	(Germany) Dominik Meffert	6	4	6

=== Top half ===
First round
1	(Japan) G Soeda	7	6
(Japan) Hiroki Moriya	5	2
(Thailand) D Udomchoke	6	6
(United States) N Monroe	4	3
WC	(Japan) T Suzuki	5	r
(Japan) H Kondo	4
(Austria) P Oswald	0	4
6	(Germany) S Rieschick	6	6
4	(Japan) Y Sugita	6	1	1
Q	(Germany) C-M Stebe	3	6	6
WC	(Japan) Kento Takeuchi	4	4
(Italy) T Fabbiano	6	6
(United States) K Kim	7	7
(Sweden) M Ryderstedt	6^{5}	5
(South Korea) W-s Jun	3	7	6^{4}
8	(Germany) A Begemann	6	6^{5}	7

Second round
1	(Japan) G Soeda	6	6
(Thailand) D Udomchoke	2	2
(Japan) H Kondo	6	4	2
6	(Germany) S Rieschick	4	6	6
Q	(Germany) C-M Stebe	6	6
(Italy) T Fabbiano	3	1
(United States) K Kim	6^{1}	6^{6}
8	(Germany) A Begemann	7	7

Quarterfinals
1	(Japan) G Soeda	6	6
6	(Germany) S Rieschick	2	4
Q	(Germany) C-M Stebe	6	6
8	(Germany) A Begemann	2	4

Semifinals
1	(Japan) G Soeda	0	7	6^{0}
Q	(Germany) C-M Stebe	6	6^{4}	7

=== Bottom half ===
First round
7	(Germany) S Stadler	6	6
(Italy) G Naso	4	3
(Chinese Taipei) T-h Yang	6^{4}	5
Q	(Brazil) T Fernandes	7	7
(South Korea) Y-k Lim	6^{0}	4
Q	(Japan) Sho Katayama	7	6
(Australia) C Ebelthite	3	0
3	(Japan) T Ito	6	6
5	(Germany) D Meffert	6	6
(India) V Vardhan	4	4
(Australia) J Lemke	4	2
Q	(Germany) P Gojowczyk	6	6
WC	(Japan) T Matsui	1	4
WC	(Japan) Y Uchiyama	6	6
(Russia) A Kumantsov	5	0^{r}
2	(Germany) M Bachinger	7	3

Second round
7	(Germany) S Stadler	6	6
Q	(Brazil) T Fernandes	0	4
Q	(Japan) Sho Katayama	6^{2}	5
3	(Japan) T Ito	7	7
5	(Germany) D Meffert	7	6
Q	(Germany) P Gojowczyk	5	3
WC	(Japan) Y Uchiyama	4	3
2	(Germany) M Bachinger	6	6

Quarterfinals
7	(Germany) S Stadler	6	7
3	(Japan) T Ito	4	6^{3}
5	(Germany) D Meffert	6	6
2	(Germany) M Bachinger	4	4

Semifinals
7	(Germany) S Stadler	1	3
5	(Germany) D Meffert	6	6
