= 2015 Shimadzu All Japan Indoor Tennis Championships – Singles =

Singles
- 2015 Shimadzu All Japan Indoor Tennis Championships

Final
- Champion: (Poland) Michał Przysiężny
- Runner-up: (Australia) John Millman
- Score: 6–3, 3–6, 6–3

Events
Singles	Doubles
← 2014 ·	Shimadzu All Japan Indoor Tennis Championships	· 2016 →

Martin Fischer was the defending champion but decided not to participate.

Michał Przysiężny won the title defeating John Millman in the final, 6–3, 3–6, 6–3.

== Seeds ==
1. (Japan) Go Soeda (quarterfinals)
2. (Japan) Tatsuma Ito (semifinals)
3. (Japan) Yūichi Sugita (second round)
4. (Australia) John Millman (final)
5. (Japan) Hiroki Moriya (quarterfinals)
6. (China) Zhang Ze (second round)
7. (Poland) Michał Przysiężny (champion)
8. (Australia) Benjamin Mitchell (second round)

== Draw ==
=== Key ===
- Q = Qualifier
- WC = Wild card
- LL = Lucky loser
- Alt = Alternate
- SE = Special exempt
- PR = Protected ranking
- ITF = ITF entry
- JE = Junior exempt
- w/o = Walkover
- r = Retired
- d = Defaulted
- SR = Special ranking

=== Finals ===
Semifinals
7	(Poland) Michał Przysiężny	7^{7}	6
(Poland) Andriej Kapaś	6^{5}	4
4	(Australia) John Millman	6	7
2	(Japan) Tatsuma Ito	3	5

Final
7	(Poland) Michał Przysiężny	6	3	6
4	(Australia) John Millman	3	6	3

=== Top half ===
First round
1	(Japan) G Soeda	6	6
Q	(Japan) Arata Onozawa	1	3
Q	(South Korea) Kim Cheong-Eui	6^{3}	1
(China) Z Li	7^{7}	6
(Russia) A Zaitcev	4	2
(Australia) J Thompson	6	6
Q	(Japan) Y Ito	3	4
7	(Poland) M Przysiężny	6	6
3	(Japan) Y Sugita	6	7^{7}
(Japan) T Matsui	4	6^{3}
WC	(Japan) T Suzuki	2	2
(Japan) Y Uchiyama	6	6
(Japan) Yu Watanuki	3	4
(Poland) A Kapaś	6	6
PR	(India) Karunuday Singh	3	4
6	(China) Z Zhang	6	6

Second round
1	(Japan) G Soeda	7^{7}	6
(China) Z Li	6^{2}	3
(Australia) J Thompson	1	6	3
7	(Poland) M Przysiężny	6	3	6
3	(Japan) Y Sugita	6^{3}	6	3
(Japan) Y Uchiyama	7^{7}	1	6
(Poland) A Kapaś	6	7^{8}
6	(China) Z Zhang	3	6^{6}

Quarterfinals
1	(Japan) G Soeda	4	2
7	(Poland) M Przysiężny	6	6
(Japan) Y Uchiyama	6	6^{8}	5
(Poland) A Kapaś	4	7^{10}	7

Semifinals
7	(Poland) M Przysiężny	7^{7}	6
(Poland) A Kapaś	6^{5}	4

=== Bottom half ===
First round
8	(Australia) B Mitchell	6	6
(Chinese Taipei) L-c Huang	4	3
WC	(Japan) Issei Okamura	1	3
Q	(Japan) H Kondo	6	6
(Japan) Shuichi Sekiguchi	3	6^{9}
(Japan) T Niki	6	7^{11}
WC	(Japan) Hiroyasu Ehara	7^{7}	1	5
4	(Australia) J Millman	6^{4}	6	7
5	(Japan) H Moriya	6	7^{7}
(Australia) M Ebden	3	6^{5}
WC	(Japan) Takashi Saito	6	6
(Japan) K Takeuchi	3	2
(Australia) A Whittington	3	6^{5}
(Japan) Yuya Kibi	6	7^{7}
(New Zealand) M Venus	6^{3}	3
2	(Japan) T Ito	7^{7}	6

Second round
8	(Australia) B Mitchell	4	4
Q	(Japan) H Kondo	6	6
(Japan) T Niki	3	6	2
4	(Australia) J Millman	6	4	6
5	(Japan) H Moriya	4	7^{8}	6
WC	(Japan) T Saito	6	6^{6}	3
(Japan) Y Kibi	5	4
2	(Japan) T Ito	7	6

Quarterfinals
Q	(Japan) H Kondo
4	(Australia) J Millman	w/o
5	(Japan) H Moriya	4	2
2	(Japan) T Ito	6	6

Semifinals
4	(Australia) J Millman	6	7
2	(Japan) T Ito	3	5
