= 2012 All Japan Indoor Tennis Championships – Singles =

Singles
- 2012 All Japan Indoor Tennis Championships

Final
- Champion: (Japan) Tatsuma Ito
- Runner-up: (Tunisia) Malek Jaziri
- Score: 6–7^{(5–7)}, 6–1, 6–2

Events
Singles	Doubles
← 2011 ·	All Japan Indoor Tennis Championships	· 2013 →

Dominik Meffert was the defending champion but decided not to participate.
Tatsuma Ito won the title, defeating Malek Jaziri 6–7^{(5–7)}, 6–1, 6–2 in the final.

== Seeds ==
1. (Japan) Go Soeda (second round)
2. (Tunisia) Malek Jaziri (final)
3. (Japan) Tatsuma Ito (champion)
4. (Japan) Yuichi Sugita (quarterfinals)
5. (Thailand) Danai Udomchoke (second round)
6. (Chinese Taipei) Yang Tsung-hua (second round)
7. (Australia) Benjamin Mitchell (first round)
8. (Finland) Harri Heliövaara (second round)

== Draw ==
=== Key ===
- Q = Qualifier
- WC = Wild card
- LL = Lucky loser
- Alt = Alternate
- ITF = ITF entry
- PR = Protected ranking
- SR = Special ranking
- SE = Special exempt
- JE = Junior exempt
- JR = Junior Accelerator Programme entrant
- CO = College Accelerator Programme entrant
- NG = Next Gen Accelerator Program entrant
- w/o = Walkover
- r = Retired
- d = Defaulted

=== Finals ===
Semifinals
(Japan) Hiroki Moriya	4	2
3	(Japan) Tatsuma Ito	6	6
(Australia) Samuel Groth	6^{2}	3
2	(Tunisia) Malek Jaziri	7^{7}	6

Final
3	(Japan) Tatsuma Ito	6^{5}	6	6
2	(Tunisia) Malek Jaziri	7^{7}	1	2

=== Top half ===
First round
1	(Japan) G Soeda	6	6
Q	(India) P Raja	4	4
WC	(Japan) Y Uchiyama	5	1
(Japan) Hiroki Moriya	7	6
(Germany) S Rieschick	6	6
(Israel) A Weintraub	4	4
(China) Z Zhang	1	6	3
6	(Chinese Taipei) T-h Yang	6	3	6
3	(Japan) T Ito	7^{7}	7
(Australia) J Lemke	6^{2}	5
(South Africa) R Klaasen	6^{4}	7^{8}	4
Q	(Australia) M Barton	7^{7}	6^{6}	6
(India) Y Bhambri	6	6
(Republic of Ireland) C Niland	1	3
WC	(Japan) T Niki	5	3
5	(Thailand) D Udomchoke	7	6

Second round
1	(Japan) G Soeda	6^{9}	1
(Japan) Hiroki Moriya	7^{11}	6
(Germany) S Rieschick	6	6
6	(Chinese Taipei) T-h Yang	2	0
3	(Japan) T Ito	3	6	6
Q	(Australia) M Barton	6	4	0
(India) Y Bhambri	3	6	6
5	(Thailand) D Udomchoke	6	4	2

Quarterfinals
(Japan) Hiroki Moriya	6	5	7^{7}
(Germany) S Rieschick	4	7	6^{5}
3	(Japan) T Ito	7^{7}	6^{4}	6
(India) Y Bhambri	6^{5}	7^{7}	3

Semifinals
(Japan) Hiroki Moriya	4	2
3	(Japan) T Ito	6	6

=== Bottom half ===
First round
8	(Finland) H Heliövaara	7	6
WC	(Japan) Shota Tagawa	5	4
(Australia) S Groth	1	6	7
Q	(Australia) B Klein	6	3	5
(South Korea) Y-k Lim	3	4
WC	(Japan) T Suzuki	6	5^{r}
(Chinese Taipei) T Chen	6^{3}	3
4	(Japan) Y Sugita	7^{7}	6
7	(Australia) B Mitchell	7	2	4
(Chinese Taipei) J Wang	5	6	6
(Australia) J Millman	6^{9}	5
(Slovakia) K Čapkovič	7^{11}	7
(Australia) Michael Look	6	7^{7}
Q	(Chinese Taipei) Y Chu-huan	4	6^{4}
(Ukraine) D Molchanov	7^{9}	6^{5}	0
2	(Tunisia) M Jaziri	6^{7}	7^{7}	6

Second round
8	(Finland) H Heliövaara	4	6	6^{5}
(Australia) S Groth	6	4	7^{7}
(South Korea) Y-k Lim	5	2
4	(Japan) Y Sugita	7	6
(Chinese Taipei) J Wang	6	2	6
(Slovakia) K Čapkovič	1	6	3
(Australia) M Look	5	5
2	(Tunisia) M Jaziri	7	7

Quarterfinals
(Australia) S Groth	7^{7}	7^{12}
4	(Japan) Y Sugita	6^{4}	6^{10}
(Chinese Taipei) J Wang	6	4	3
2	(Tunisia) M Jaziri	0	6	6

Semifinals
(Australia) S Groth	6^{2}	3
2	(Tunisia) M Jaziri	7^{7}	6
