= 2010 Shimadzu All Japan Indoor Tennis Championships – Singles =

Singles
- 2010 Shimadzu All Japan Indoor Tennis Championships

Final
- Champion: (Japan) Yuichi Sugita
- Runner-up: (Australia) Matthew Ebden
- Score: 4–6, 6–4, 6–1

Events
Singles	Doubles
← 2009 ·	Shimadzu All Japan Indoor Tennis Championships	· 2011 →

Sergei Bubka was the defending champion; however, he lost 0–6, 6–4 6–7^{(3–7)} to Yuichi Sugita in the second round.
Sugita defeated Matthew Ebden in the final (4–6, 6–4, 6–1).

== Seeds ==
1. (Poland) Michał Przysiężny (semifinals)
2. (Austria) Martin Fischer (first round)
3. (Japan) Tatsuma Ito (quarterfinals)
4. (Ukraine) Sergei Bubka (second round)
5. (Australia) Greg Jones (second round)
6. (Germany) Simon Stadler (first round)
7. (New Zealand) Daniel King-Turner (first round)
8. (Germany) Andre Begemann (quarterfinals)

== Draw ==
=== Key ===
- Q = Qualifier
- WC = Wild card
- LL = Lucky loser
- Alt = Alternate
- SE = Special exempt
- PR = Protected ranking
- ITF = ITF entry
- JE = Junior exempt
- w/o = Walkover
- r = Retired
- d = Defaulted
- SR = Special ranking

=== Finals ===
Semifinals
1	(Poland) Michał Przysiężny	3	6^{6}
(Japan) Yuichi Sugita	6	7
(Australia) Rameez Junaid	3	4
(Australia) Matthew Ebden	6	6

Final
(Japan) Yuichi Sugita	4	6	6
(Australia) Matthew Ebden	6	4	1

=== Top half ===
First round
1	(Poland) M Przysiężny	7	4	6
(Australia) B Klein	6^{3}	6	3
(Australia) J Sirianni	6	0	6
(France) L Rochette	3	6	4
(Japan) G Soeda	6	6
(Chinese Taipei) T-h Yang	2	1
(New Zealand) J Statham	3	6	4
5	(Australia) G Jones	6	4	6
4	(Ukraine) S Bubka	6^{6}	6	6
WC	(Japan) J Mitsuhashi	7	4	4
WC	(Japan) K Takeuchi	4	3
(Japan) Y Sugita	6	6
(India) V Vardhan	7	2	4
(Australia) S Kadir	6^{4}	6	6
WC	(Japan) T Matsui	1	1
8	(Germany) A Begemann	6	6

Second round
1	(Poland) M Przysiężny	6	6
(Australia) J Sirianni	1	3
(Japan) G Soeda	6	3	6
5	(Australia) G Jones	2	6	2
4	(Ukraine) S Bubka	0	6	6^{3}
(Japan) Y Sugita	6	4	7
(Australia) S Kadir	3	4
8	(Germany) A Begemann	6	6

Quarterfinals
1	(Poland) M Przysiężny	6	2	7
(Japan) G Soeda	3	6	6^{6}
(Japan) Y Sugita	7	1	6
8	(Germany) A Begemann	6^{2}	6	3

Semifinals
1	(Poland) M Przysiężny	3	6^{6}
(Japan) Y Sugita	6	7

=== Bottom half ===
First round
7	(New Zealand) D King-Turner	4	4
(Australia) R Junaid	6	6
(Austria) P Oswald	6	6
(South Korea) Y-J Kim	0	4
Q	(Japan) H Kondo	6	3	2
WC	(Japan) H Moriya	4	6	6
(Russia) V Rudnev	7	6^{0}	2
3	(Japan) T Ito	6^{3}	7	6
6	(Germany) S Stadler	4	6	4
(Australia) M Ebden	6	4	6
Q	(Germany) S Rieschick	6	6
Q	(Japan) Y Ito	3	3
(Australia) J Millman	6	6
Q	(Japan) S Katayama	1	4
(Japan) T Suzuki	7	6
2	(Austria) M Fischer	6^{2}	3

Second round
(Australia) R Junaid	6	6
(Austria) P Oswald	3	4
WC	(Japan) H Moriya	1	4
3	(Japan) T Ito	6	6
(Australia) M Ebden	6	6
Q	(Germany) S Rieschick	2	2
(Australia) J Millman	6	4	6
(Japan) T Suzuki	4	6	3

Quarterfinals
(Australia) R Junaid	5	6	6
3	(Japan) T Ito	7	2	4
(Australia) M Ebden	7	6
(Australia) J Millman	6^{5}	3

Semifinals
(Australia) R Junaid	3	4
(Australia) M Ebden	6	6
