= 2016 Shimadzu All Japan Indoor Tennis Championships – Doubles =

Doubles
- 2016 Shimadzu All Japan Indoor Tennis Championships

Final
- Champions: (China) Gong Maoxin (Chinese Taipei) Yi Chu-huan
- Runners-up: (Japan) Go Soeda (Japan) Yasutaka Uchiyama
- Score: 6–3 , 7–6^{(9–7)}

Events
Singles	Doubles
← 2015 ·	Shimadzu All Japan Indoor Tennis Championships	· 2017 →

Benjamin Mitchell and Jordan Thompson are the defending champions, but only Mitchell is defending his title, partnering Matthew Barton.

Mitchell and Barton withdrew before their quarterfinal match with third seeds Li Ze and Peng Hsien-yin.

Gong Maoxin and Yi Chu-huan won the title, defeating Go Soeda and Yasutaka Uchiyama in the final 6–3, 7–6^{(9–7)}.

== Seeds ==
1. (Thailand) Sanchai Ratiwatana / (Thailand) Sonchat Ratiwatana (quarterfinals)
2. (China) Bai Yan / (Chinese Taipei) Chen Ti (first round)
3. (China) Li Zhe / (Chinese Taipei) Peng Hsien-yin (semifinals)
4. (China) Gong Maoxin / (Chinese Taipei) Yi Chu-huan (champions)

== Draw ==
=== Key ===
- Q = Qualifier
- WC = Wild card
- LL = Lucky loser
- Alt = Alternate
- ITF = ITF entry
- PR = Protected ranking
- SR = Special ranking
- SE = Special exempt
- JE = Junior exempt
- JR = Junior Accelerator Programme entrant
- CO = College Accelerator Programme entrant
- NG = Next Gen Accelerator Program entrant
- w/o = Walkover
- r = Retired
- d = Defaulted

First round
1	(Thailand) Sa Ratiwatana (Thailand) Sa Ratiwatana	3	6	[10]
WC	(Japan) Masakatsu Noguchi (Japan) Shunrou Takeshima	6	3	[8]
(Australia) L Saville (New Zealand) F Tearney	7	2	[5]
(Japan) G Soeda (Japan) Y Uchiyama	5	6	[10]
3	(China) Z Li (Chinese Taipei) H-y Peng	6	6
(Germany) A Beck (Italy) F Cipolla	3	4
(Australia) M Barton (Australia) B Mitchell	6^{3}	7	[10]
(United States) P Kobelt (South Africa) T Vorster	7^{7}	5	[5]
(Chinese Taipei) C-p Hsieh (Chinese Taipei) J Wang	7^{7}	2	[10]
(Japan) H Moriya (China) Z Zhang	6^{2}	6	[4]
WC	(Japan) H Kondo (Japan) Ken Onishi	6	6^{5}	[6]
4	(China) M Gong (Chinese Taipei) C-h Yi	4	7^{7}	[10]
(Italy) A Bega (France) M Janvier	5	7^{7}	[10]
WC	(Japan) Sora Fukuda (Poland) A Kapaś	7	6^{5}	[7]
Alt	(Japan) Hiroyasu Ehara (Japan) Sho Katayama	6	2	[10]
2	(China) Y Bai (Chinese Taipei) T Chen	4	6	[8]

Quarterfinals
1	(Thailand) Sa Ratiwatana (Thailand) Sa Ratiwatana	4	6^{3}
(Japan) G Soeda (Japan) Y Uchiyama	6	7^{7}
3	(China) Z Li (Chinese Taipei) H-y Peng	w/o
(Australia) M Barton (Australia) B Mitchell
(Chinese Taipei) C-p Hsieh (Chinese Taipei) J Wang	4	0
4	(China) M Gong (Chinese Taipei) C-h Yi	6	6
(Italy) A Bega (France) M Janvier	5	6	[10]
Alt	(Japan) H Ehara (Japan) S Katayama	7	2	[7]

Semifinals
(Japan) G Soeda (Japan) Y Uchiyama	6	6
3	(China) Z Li (Chinese Taipei) H-y Peng	4	4
4	(China) M Gong (Chinese Taipei) C-h Yi	6	6
(Italy) A Bega (France) M Janvier	4	4

Final
(Japan) G Soeda (Japan) Y Uchiyama	3	6^{7}
4	(China) M Gong (Chinese Taipei) C-h Yi	6	7^{9}
