= 2011 All Japan Indoor Tennis Championships =

- Date: 7–13 March
- Edition: 15th
- Location: Kyoto, Japan

Champions

Singles
- (Germany) Dominik Meffert

Doubles
- (Germany) Dominik Meffert / (Germany) Simon Stadler
← 2010 ·	All Japan Indoor Tennis Championships	· 2012 →

The 2011 All Japan Indoor Tennis Championships was a professional tennis tournament played on carpet courts. It was the 15th edition of the tournament which was part of the 2011 ATP Challenger Tour. It took place in Kyoto, Japan between 7 and 13 March 2011.

== ATP entrants ==
=== Seeds ===
Country	Player	Rank^{1}	Seed
JPN	Go Soeda	110	1
GER	Matthias Bachinger	158	2
JPN	Tatsuma Ito	171	3
JPN	Yūichi Sugita	176	4
GER	Dominik Meffert	210	5
GER	Sebastian Rieschick	219	6
GER	Simon Stadler	254	7
GER	Andre Begemann	273	8

- Rankings are as of February 28, 2011.

=== Other entrants ===
The following players received wildcards into the singles main draw:

- (Japan) Toshihide Matsui
- (Japan) Takao Suzuki
- (Japan) Kento Takeuchi
- (Japan) Yasutaka Uchiyama

The following players received entry from the qualifying draw:

- (Brazil) Tiago Fernandes
- (Germany) Peter Gojowczyk
- (Japan) Sho Katayama
- (Germany) Cedrik-Marcel Stebe

== Champions ==
=== Singles ===
(Germany) Dominik Meffert def. (Germany) Cedrik-Marcel Stebe, 4–6, 6–4, 6–2

=== Doubles ===
(Germany) Dominik Meffert / (Germany) Simon Stadler def. (Germany) Andre Begemann / (Australia) James Lemke, 7–5, 2–6, [10–7]
