= 2013 All Japan Indoor Tennis Championships =

- Date: 4–10 March
- Edition: 17th
- Draw: 32S / 16D
- Prize money: $35,000+H
- Surface: Carpet
- Location: Kyoto, Japan

Champions

Singles
- (Australia) John Millman

Doubles
- (India) Purav Raja / (India) Divij Sharan
- All Japan Indoor Tennis Championships

The 2013 All Japan Indoor Tennis Championships was a professional tennis tournament played on carpet. It was the 17th edition of the tournament which was part of the 2013 ATP Challenger Tour. It took place in Kyoto, Japan between 4 and 10 March.

== ATP singles main-draw entrants ==
=== Seeds ===
Country	Player	Rank^{1}	Seed
JPN	Yūichi Sugita	137	1
SUI	Marco Chiudinelli	143	2
CHN	Zhang Ze	162	3
AUS	John Millman	165	4
JPN	Hiroki Moriya	176	5
POL	Michał Przysiężny	178	6
GER	Peter Gojowczyk	185	7
GER	Dominik Meffert	194	8

- ^{1} Rankings are as of February 25, 2013.

=== Other entrants ===
The following players received wildcards into the singles main draw:

- (Japan) Takuto Niki
- (Japan) Masato Shiga
- (Japan) Kento Takeuchi
- (Japan) Yasutaka Uchiyama

The following players received entry from the qualifying draw:

- (Japan) Hiroki Kondo
- (Japan) Toshihide Matsui
- (Slovakia) Adrian Sikora
- (New Zealand) Michael Venus

The following player received entry by a lucky loser:

- (Japan) Shuichi Sekiguchi

== Doubles main-draw entrants ==
=== Seeds ===
Country	Player	Country	Player	Rank^{1}	Seed
IND	Purav Raja	IND	Divij Sharan	281	1
AUS	Chris Guccione	AUS	Matt Reid	375	2
NZL	Artem Sitak	NZL	Jose Statham	465	3
TPE	Hsieh Cheng-peng	TPE	Yang Tsung-hua	492	4

- ^{1} Rankings as of February 24, 2013.

=== Other entrants ===
The following pairs received wildcards into the doubles main draw:

- (Japan) Sho Katayama / (Japan) Bumpei Sato
- (Japan) Hiroki Kondo / (Japan) Hiroki Moriya
- (Japan) Kento Takeuchi / (Japan) Kaichi Uchida

The following pairs received entry as an alternate into the doubles main draw:

- (Japan) Hiroyasu Ehara / (Japan) Shuichi Sekiguchi
- (Japan) Yuichi Ito / (Japan) Takuto Niki

== Champions ==
=== Singles ===
- (Australia) John Millman def. (Switzerland) Marco Chiudinelli, 4–6, 6–4, 7–6^{(7–2)}

=== Doubles ===
(India) Purav Raja / (India) Divij Sharan def. (Australia) Chris Guccione / (Australia) Matt Reid, 6–4, 7–5
