= 2015 Shimadzu All Japan Indoor Tennis Championships =

- Date: 23 February – 1 March
- Edition: 19th
- Draw: 32S / 16D
- Prize money: $50,000+H
- Surface: carpet
- Location: Kyoto, Japan

Champions

Singles
- (Poland) Michał Przysiężny

Doubles
- (Australia) Benjamin Mitchell / (Australia) Jordan Thompson
- Shimadzu All Japan Indoor Tennis Championships

The 2015 Shimadzu All Japan Indoor Tennis Championships was a professional tennis tournament played on carpet. It was the 19th edition of the tournament which was part of the 2015 ATP Challenger Tour. It took place in Kyoto, Japan between 23 February and 1 March.

== ATP singles main draw entrants ==
=== Seeds ===
Country	Player	Rank^{1}	Seed
JPN	Go Soeda	82	1
JPN	Tatsuma Ito	94	2
JPN	Yūichi Sugita	131	3
AUS	John Millman	149	4
JPN	Hiroki Moriya	158	5
CHN	Zhang Ze	180	6
POL	Michał Przysiężny	185	7
AUS	Benjamin Mitchell	212	8

- ^{1} Rankings are as of February 16, 2015.

=== Other entrants ===
The following players received wildcards into the singles main draw:

- (Japan) Hiroyasu Ehara
- (Japan) Issei Okamura
- (Japan) Takashi Saito
- (Japan) Takao Suzuki

The following players received entry into the main draw using a protected ranking:

- (India) Karunuday Singh

The following players received entry from the qualifying draw:

- (Japan) Yūichi Ito
- (South Korea) Kim Cheong-Eui
- (Japan) Hiroki Kondo
- (Japan) Arata Onozawa

== Champions ==
=== Singles ===
- (Poland) Michał Przysiężny def. (Australia) John Millman, 6–3, 3–6, 6–3

=== Doubles ===
- (Australia) Benjamin Mitchell / (Australia) Jordan Thompson def. (Japan) Go Soeda / (Japan) Yasutaka Uchiyama, 6–3, 6–2
