= 2013 All Japan Indoor Tennis Championships – Singles =

Singles
- 2013 All Japan Indoor Tennis Championships

Final
- Champion: (Australia) John Millman
- Runner-up: (Switzerland) Marco Chiudinelli
- Score: 4–6, 6–4, 7–6^{(7–2)}

Events
| Singles | Doubles |
- All Japan Indoor Tennis Championships

Tatsuma Ito was the defending champion but decided to participate at the 2013 BNP Paribas Open instead.
In the final, fourth seeded John Millman outlasted second seeded Marco Chiudinelli in 2 hours and 26 minutes to claim the title with a scoreline of 4–6, 6–4, 7–6^{(7–2)}.

== Seeds ==
1. (Japan) Yūichi Sugita (quarterfinals)
2. (Switzerland) Marco Chiudinelli (final)
3. (China) Zhang Ze (withdrew)
4. (Australia) John Millman (champion)
5. (Japan) Hiroki Moriya (semifinals)
6. (Poland) Michał Przysiężny (quarterfinals)
7. (Germany) Peter Gojowczyk (quarterfinals)
8. (Germany) Dominik Meffert (quarterfinals)

== Draw ==
Key

- Q = Qualifier
- WC = Wild card
- LL = Lucky loser
- Alt = Alternate
- ITF = ITF entry
- PR = Protected ranking
- SR = Special ranking
- SE = Special exempt
- JE = Junior exempt
- JR = Junior Accelerator Programme entrant
- CO = College Accelerator Programme entrant
- NG = Next Gen Accelerator Program entrant
- w/o = Walkover
- r = Retired
- d = Defaulted

=== Finals ===
Semifinals
5 | (Japan) Hiroki Moriya | 6^{4} | 1
4 | (Australia) John Millman | 7^{7} | 6
(Australia) Matthew Barton | 6^{6} | 4
2 | (Switzerland) Marco Chiudinelli | 7^{8} | 6

Final
4 | (Australia) John Millman | 4 | 6 | 7^{7}
2 | (Switzerland) Marco Chiudinelli | 6 | 4 | 6^{2}

=== Top half ===
First round
1 | (Japan) Y Sugita | 6 | 6
(Australia) M Reid | 4 | 4
(Australia) G Jones | 7^{7} | 7
(Australia) B Mitchell | 6^{5} | 5
(China) M Gong | 7^{7} | 1 | 3
SE | (New Zealand) A Sitak | 6^{6} | 6 | 6
(Chinese Taipei) T-h Yang | 2 | 4
5 | (Japan) H Moriya | 6 | 6
4 | (Australia) J Millman | 7^{7} | 6
Q | (Japan) T Matsui | 6^{4} | 4
Q | (Japan) H Kondo | 6 | 6
Q | (Slovakia) Adrian Sikora | 2 | 0
(Australia) S Groth | 7^{7} | 6
(South Korea) S-y Jeong | 6^{5} | 4
WC | (Japan) T Niki | 3 | 4
7 | (Germany) P Gojowczyk | 6 | 6

Second round
1 | (Japan) Y Sugita | w/o
(Australia) G Jones
SE | (New Zealand) A Sitak
5 | (Japan) H Moriya | w/o
4 | (Australia) J Millman | 4 | 6 | 7^{7}
Q | (Japan) H Kondo | 6 | 1 | 6^{3}
(Australia) S Groth | 4 | 4
7 | (Germany) P Gojowczyk | 6 | 6

Quarterfinals
1 | (Japan) Y Sugita | 6^{4} | 7 | 3
5 | (Japan) H Moriya | 7^{7} | 5 | 6
4 | (Australia) J Millman | 6 | 3 | 6
7 | (Germany) P Gojowczyk | 3 | 6 | 3

Semifinals
5 | (Japan) H Moriya | 6^{4} | 1
4 | (Australia) J Millman | 7^{7} | 6

=== Bottom half ===
First round
8 | (Germany) D Meffert | 6 | 6
WC | (Japan) K Takeuchi | 3 | 4
Q | (New Zealand) M Venus | 5 | 3
(Italy) A Arnaboldi | 7 | 6
WC | (Japan) Masato Shiga | 0 | 3
(Australia) M Barton | 6 | 6
(Japan) Y Uchiyama | 6 | 4 | 6
LL | (Japan) Shuichi Sekiguchi | 3 | 6 | 0
6 | (Poland) M Przysiężny | 7 | 6
WC | (Japan) K Uchida | 5 | 3
(India) Y Bhambri | 6 | 6
(South Korea) L-c Huang | 4 | 2
(New Zealand) J Statham | 4 | 6 | 3
(Australia) J Duckworth | 6 | 4 | 6
(Australia) L Saville | 6 | 4 | 0
2 | (Switzerland) M Chiudinelli | 3 | 6 | 6

Second round
8 | (Germany) D Meffert | 7^{7} | 7^{7}
(Italy) A Arnaboldi | 6^{4} | 6^{0}
(Australia) M Barton | 7^{7} | 6
(Japan) Y Uchiyama | 6^{0} | 4
6 | (Poland) M Przysiężny | 6^{4} | 6 | 7
(India) Y Bhambri | 7^{7} | 3 | 5
(Australia) J Duckworth | 6^{5} | 7^{9} | 2
2 | (Switzerland) M Chiudinelli | 7^{7} | 6^{7} | 6

Quarterfinals
8 | (Germany) D Meffert | 6 | 3 | 4
(Australia) M Barton | 3 | 6 | 6
6 | (Poland) M Przysiężny | 6 | 6^{9} | 1
2 | (Switzerland) M Chiudinelli | 3 | 7^{11} | 6

Semifinals
(Australia) M Barton | 6^{6} | 4
2 | (Switzerland) M Chiudinelli | 7^{8} | 6
