= 2015 Shimadzu All Japan Indoor Tennis Championships – Doubles =

Doubles
- 2015 Shimadzu All Japan Indoor Tennis Championships

Final
- Champions: (Australia) Benjamin Mitchell (Australia) Jordan Thompson
- Runners-up: (Japan) Go Soeda (Japan) Yasutaka Uchiyama
- Score: 6–3, 6–2

Events
Singles	Doubles
- Shimadzu All Japan Indoor Tennis Championships

Purav Raja and Divij Sharan were the defending champions but chose not to compete.

Benjamin Mitchell and Jordan Thompson defeated Go Soeda and Yasutaka Uchiyama in the final, 6–3, 6–2, to win the title.

== Seeds ==
1. (Thailand) Sanchai Ratiwatana / (Thailand) Sonchat Ratiwatana (first round)
2. (Australia) Matthew Ebden / (Chinese Taipei) Lee Hsin-han (first round)
3. (China) Li Zhe / (New Zealand) Michael Venus (first round)
4. (Poland) Andriej Kapaś / (Poland) Michał Przysiężny (quarterfinals)

== Draw ==
Key

- Q = Qualifier
- WC = Wild card
- LL = Lucky loser
- Alt = Alternate
- ITF = ITF entry
- PR = Protected ranking
- SR = Special ranking
- SE = Special exempt
- JE = Junior exempt
- JR = Junior Accelerator Programme entrant
- CO = College Accelerator Programme entrant
- NG = Next Gen Accelerator Program entrant
- w/o = Walkover
- r = Retired
- d = Defaulted

=== Draw ===
First round
1	(Thailand) S Ratiwatana (Thailand) S Ratiwatana	3	4
(Australia) B Mitchell (Australia) J Thompson	6	6
(Japan) T Ito (Japan) T Matsui	6	6
(Japan) Yuya Kibi (Japan) T Niki	3	4
3	(China) Z Li (New Zealand) M Venus	4	3
WC	(Japan) Sho Katayama (Japan) Bumpei Sato	6	6
WC	(Japan) H Kondo (Japan) T Suzuki	6	6
WC	(Japan) Hiroyasu Ehara (Japan) Takashi Saito	4	2
(China) M Gong (China) Z Zhang	6	3	[7]
(Japan) G Soeda (Japan) Y Uchiyama	4	6	[10]
(Japan) H Moriya (Japan) Arata Onozawa	3	4
4	(Poland) A Kapaś (Poland) M Przysiężny	6	6
PR	(India) Karunuday Singh (Australia) A Whittington	7^{13}	3	[10]
(Chinese Taipei) L-c Huang (Japan) Y Sugita	6^{11}	6	[8]
(Japan) Shuichi Sekiguchi (Russia) A Zaitcev	6	6
2	(Australia) M Ebden (Chinese Taipei) H-h Lee	4	1

Quarterfinals
(Australia) B Mitchell (Australia) J Thompson	6^{8}	7	[10]
(Japan) T Ito (Japan) T Matsui	7^{10}	5	[2]
WC	(Japan) S Katayama (Japan) B Sato	w/o
WC	(Japan) H Kondo (Japan) T Suzuki
(Japan) G Soeda (Japan) Y Uchiyama	7	7
4	(Poland) A Kapaś (Poland) M Przysiężny	5	5
PR	(India) K Singh (Australia) A Whittington	6	6
(Japan) S Sekiguchi (Russia) A Zaitcev	0	3

Semifinals
(Australia) B Mitchell (Australia) J Thompson	6	6
WC	(Japan) S Katayama (Japan) B Sato	3	1
(Japan) G Soeda (Japan) Y Uchiyama	6	7^{7}
PR	(India) K Singh (Australia) A Whittington	4	6^{4}

Final
(Australia) B Mitchell (Australia) J Thompson	6	6
(Japan) G Soeda (Japan) Y Uchiyama	3	2
