= 2016 Shimadzu All Japan Indoor Tennis Championships =

- Date: 22 – 28 February
- Edition: 20th
- Draw: 32S / 16D
- Prize money: $50,000+H
- Surface: carpet
- Location: Kyoto, Japan

Champions

Singles
- (Japan) Yūichi Sugita

Doubles
- (China) Gong Maoxin / (Chinese Taipei) Yi Chu-huan
- Shimadzu All Japan Indoor Tennis Championships

The 2016 Shimadzu All Japan Indoor Tennis Championships was a professional tennis tournament played on carpet. It was the 20th edition of the tournament which was part of the 2016 ATP Challenger Tour. It took place in Kyoto, Japan between 22 and 28 February.

== ATP singles main draw entrants ==
=== Seeds ===
| Country | Player | Rank^{1} | Seed |
|---|---|---|---|
| JPN | Yūichi Sugita | 117 | 1 |
| JPN | Tatsuma Ito | 120 | 2 |
| JPN | Go Soeda | 131 | 3 |
| AUS | Luke Saville | 184 | 4 |
| JPN | Hiroki Moriya | 190 | 5 |
| CHN | Bai Yan | 211 | 6 |
| TPE | Chen Ti | 220 | 7 |
| KOR | Lee Duck-hee | 230 | 8 |

- ^{1} Rankings are as of February 15, 2016.

=== Other entrants ===
The following players received wildcards into the singles main draw:

- (Japan) Sora Fukuda
- (Japan) Shintaro Imai
- (Japan) Ken Onishi
- (Japan) Yasutaka Uchiyama

The following players received entry from the qualifying draw:

- (Poland) Andriej Kapaś
- (Japan) Yuya Kibi
- (Australia) Luke Saville
- (Japan) Shuichi Sekiguchi

== Champions ==
=== Singles ===
- (Japan) Yūichi Sugita def. (China) Zhang Ze 5–7, 6–3, 6–4

=== Doubles ===
- (China) Gong Maoxin / (Chinese Taipei) Yi Chu-huan def. (Japan) Go Soeda / (Japan) Yasutaka Uchiyama 6–3, 7–6^{(9–7)}
