= Kyoto Challenger =

Kyoto Challenger may refer to one of two Challenger tennis tournaments:

- Kyoto Indoor, known now as the Shimadzu All Japan Indoor Tennis Championships, held from 1997
- Kyoto Outdoor, played on clay in 1978 and 1981
