= 2017 Shimadzu All Japan Indoor Tennis Championships – Doubles =

Doubles
- 2017 Shimadzu All Japan Indoor Tennis Championships

Final
- Champions: (Thailand) Sanchai Ratiwatana (Thailand) Sonchat Ratiwatana
- Runners-up: (Belgium) Ruben Bemelmans (Belgium) Joris De Loore
- Score: 4–6, 6–4, [10–7]

Events
Singles	Doubles
← 2016 ·	Shimadzu All Japan Indoor Tennis Championships	· 2018 →

Gong Maoxin and Yi Chu-huan were the defending champions but chose to defend their title with different partners. Gong partnered Zhang Ze but lost in the quarterfinals to Ruben Gonzales and Hsieh Cheng-peng. Yi partnered Yuya Kibi but withdrew from the tournament due to an injury to Kibi.

Sanchai and Sonchat Ratiwatana won the title after defeating Ruben Bemelmans and Joris De Loore 4–6, 6–4, [10–7] in the final.

== Seeds ==
1. (Thailand) Sanchai Ratiwatana / (Thailand) Sonchat Ratiwatana (champions)
2. (Australia) Marc Polmans / (Australia) Luke Saville (semifinals)
3. (China) Gong Maoxin / (China) Zhang Ze (quarterfinals)
4. (Australia) Steven de Waard / (Australia) Andrew Whittington (quarterfinals)

== Draw ==
Key

- Q = Qualifier
- WC = Wild card
- LL = Lucky loser
- Alt = Alternate
- ITF = ITF entry
- PR = Protected ranking
- SR = Special ranking
- SE = Special exempt
- JE = Junior exempt
- JR = Junior Accelerator Programme entrant
- CO = College Accelerator Programme entrant
- NG = Next Gen Accelerator Program entrant
- w/o = Walkover
- r = Retired
- d = Defaulted

First round
1	(Thailand) Sa Ratiwatana (Thailand) So Ratiwatana	7	6
WC	(Japan) Katsuki Nagao (Japan) Hiromasa Oku	5	3
(Chinese Taipei) T Chen (Japan) T Matsui	4	6^{6}
(Slovenia) B Kavčič (Croatia) F Škugor	6	7^{8}
3	(China) M Gong (China) Z Zhang	6	6
(Croatia) M Draganja (Croatia) T Draganja	4	4
(Philippines) R Gonzales (Chinese Taipei) C-p Hsieh	6	6^{3}	[10]
(United Kingdom) B Klein (South Africa) R Roelofse	3	7^{7}	[7]
(Belgium) R Bemelmans (Belgium) J De Loore	w/o
(Japan) Yuya Kibi (Chinese Taipei) C-h Yi
WC	(Japan) Sora Fukuda (Japan) Y Sugita	3	3
4	(Australia) S de Waard (Australia) A Whittington	6	6
(New Zealand) B McLachlan (Argentina) A Velotti	6^{2}	4
(Chinese Taipei) H-y Peng (China) D Wu	7^{7}	6
WC	(Japan) Masakatsu Noguchi (Japan) T Suzuki	5	6^{2}
2	(Australia) M Polmans (Australia) L Saville	7	7^{7}

Quarterfinals
1	(Thailand) Sa Ratiwatana (Thailand) So Ratiwatana	6	7
(Slovenia) B Kavčič (Croatia) F Škugor	4	5
3	(China) M Gong (China) Z Zhang	6^{5}	7^{7}	[7]
(Philippines) R Gonzales (Chinese Taipei) C-p Hsieh	7^{7}	6^{2}	[10]
(Belgium) R Bemelmans (Belgium) J De Loore	6	3	[10]
4	(Australia) S de Waard (Australia) A Whittington	2	6	[8]
(Chinese Taipei) H-y Peng (China) D Wu	3	6	[4]
2	(Australia) M Polmans (Australia) L Saville	6	3	[10]

Semifinals
1	(Thailand) Sa Ratiwatana (Thailand) So Ratiwatana	6	7^{7}
(Philippines) R Gonzales (Chinese Taipei) C-p Hsieh	4	6^{3}
(Belgium) R Bemelmans (Belgium) J De Loore	6	6
2	(Australia) M Polmans (Australia) L Saville	4	2

Final
1	(Thailand) Sa Ratiwatana (Thailand) So Ratiwatana	4	6	[10]
(Belgium) R Bemelmans (Belgium) J De Loore	6	4	[7]
