= 2014 All Japan Indoor Tennis Championships =

- Date: 3–9 March
- Edition: 18th
- Draw: 32S / 16D
- Prize money: $35,000+H
- Surface: Carpet
- Location: Kyoto, Japan

Champions

Singles
- (Austria) Martin Fischer

Doubles
- (India) Purav Raja / (India) Divij Sharan
- All Japan Indoor Tennis Championships

The 2014 All Japan Indoor Tennis Championships was a professional tennis tournament played on carpet. It was the 18th edition of the tournament which was part of the 2014 ATP Challenger Tour. It took place in Kyoto, Japan between 3 and 9 March.

== ATP singles main-draw entrants ==
=== Seeds ===
Country	Player	Rank^{1}	Seed
JPN	Go Soeda	141	1
LTU	Ričardas Berankis	145	2
JPN	Tatsuma Ito	156	3
JPN	Yūichi Sugita	161	4
JPN	Hiroki Moriya	167	5
SUI	Marco Chiudinelli	176	6
GER	Andreas Beck	185	7
AUT	Martin Fischer	187	8

- ^{1} Rankings are as of February 24, 2014.

=== Other entrants ===
The following players received wildcards into the singles main draw:

- (Japan) Hiroyasu Ehara
- (Japan) Takuto Niki
- (Japan) Takashi Saito
- (Japan) Kento Takeuchi

The following players received entry from the qualifying draw:

- (Chinese Taipei) Peng Hsien-yin
- (Japan) Arata Onozawa
- (Chinese Taipei) Wang Chieh-fu
- (Japan) Yuuya Kibi

The following players received entry as a lucky loser into the singles main draw:

- (Japan) Toshihide Matsui

== Champions ==
=== Singles ===
- (Austria) Martin Fischer def. (Japan) Tatsuma Ito, 3–6, 7–5, 6–4

=== Doubles ===
- (India) Purav Raja / (India) Divij Sharan def. (Thailand) Sanchai Ratiwatana / (New Zealand) Michael Venus, 5–7, 7–6^{(7–3)}, [10–4]
