= 2017 Shimadzu All Japan Indoor Tennis Championships – Singles =

Singles
- 2017 Shimadzu All Japan Indoor Tennis Championships

Final
- Champion: (Japan) Yasutaka Uchiyama
- Runner-up: (Slovenia) Blaž Kavčič
- Score: 6–3, 6–4

Events
Singles	Doubles
- Shimadzu All Japan Indoor Tennis Championships

Yūichi Sugita was the defending champion but lost in the quarterfinals to Lloyd Harris.

Yasutaka Uchiyama won the title after defeating Blaž Kavčič 6–3, 6–4 in the final.

== Seeds ==
1. (Japan) Yūichi Sugita (quarterfinals)
2. (Slovenia) Grega Žemlja (semifinals)
3. (Belgium) Ruben Bemelmans (second round)
4. (China) Zhang Ze (second round)
5. (Australia) Andrew Whittington (first round)
6. (Slovenia) Blaž Kavčič (final)
7. (Japan) Tatsuma Ito (second round)
8. (Argentina) Agustín Velotti (first round)

== Draw ==
Key

- Q = Qualifier
- WC = Wild card
- LL = Lucky loser
- Alt = Alternate
- ITF = ITF entry
- PR = Protected ranking
- SR = Special ranking
- SE = Special exempt
- JE = Junior exempt
- JR = Junior Accelerator Programme entrant
- CO = College Accelerator Programme entrant
- NG = Next Gen Accelerator Program entrant
- w/o = Walkover
- r = Retired
- d = Defaulted

=== Finals ===
Semifinals
Q	(South Africa) Lloyd Harris	4	7^{7}	6^{5}
6	(Slovenia) Blaž Kavčič	6	6^{3}	7^{7}
(Japan) Yasutaka Uchiyama	3	6	6
2	(Slovenia) Grega Žemlja	6	4	3

Final
6	(Slovenia) Blaž Kavčič	3	4
(Japan) Yasutaka Uchiyama	6	6

=== Top half ===
First round
1	(Japan) Y Sugita	7^{7}	6
(Australia) L Saville	6^{4}	3
(Japan) H Moriya	3	6	4
PR	(Germany) C-M Stebe	6	2	6
(Serbia) M Tepavac	4	6	1
Q	(South Africa) L Harris	6	4	6
(China) D Wu	6	6
8	(Argentina) A Velotti	3	2
3	(Belgium) R Bemelmans	6	6
(Australia) B Mott	4	4
(Belgium) J De Loore	4	6	6^{9}
WC	(Japan) Yo Watanuki	6	3	7^{11}
WC	(Japan) Toru Horie	4	3
(Slovenia) B Rola	6	6
Q	(Chinese Taipei) J Wang	0	7^{7}	1
6	(Slovenia) B Kavčič	6	6^{2}	6

Second round
1	(Japan) Y Sugita	6	5	6
PR	(Germany) C-M Stebe	4	7	3
Q	(South Africa) L Harris	6	6
(China) D Wu	4	4
3	(Belgium) R Bemelmans	6	4	6^{4}
WC	(Japan) Yo Watanuki	1	6	7^{7}
(Slovenia) B Rola	6^{4}	6	6^{5}
6	(Slovenia) B Kavčič	7^{7}	2	7^{7}

Quarterfinals
1	(Japan) Y Sugita	6^{2}	5
Q	(South Africa) L Harris	7^{7}	7
WC	(Japan) Yo Watanuki	4	6	4
6	(Slovenia) B Kavčič	6	2	6

Semifinals
Q	(South Africa) L Harris	4	7^{7}	6^{5}
6	(Slovenia) B Kavčič	6	6^{3}	7^{7}

=== Bottom half ===
First round
7	(Japan) T Ito	6	6
LL	(Japan) Shuichi Sekiguchi	2	3
Q	(Russia) E Karlovskiy	3	6	6
(Japan) Yuya Kibi	6	1	2
(Japan) Y Uchiyama	6	6
(Australia) M Matosevic	3	3
WC	(Japan) K Uesugi	1	1
4	(China) Z Zhang	6	6
5	(Australia) A Whittington	4	6^{6}
(Chinese Taipei) T Chen	6	7^{8}
(United Kingdom) B Klein	4	7^{7}	3
(Croatia) F Škugor	6	6^{1}	6
Q	(South Korea) S-w Kwon	6	6
WC	(Japan) Jumpei Yamasaki	1	1
(Australia) M Polmans	5	4
2	(Slovenia) G Žemlja	7	6

Second round
7	(Japan) T Ito	6	5	0^{r}
Q	(Russia) E Karlovskiy	3	7	3
(Japan) Y Uchiyama	7^{7}	4	6
4	(China) Z Zhang	6^{5}	6	3
(Chinese Taipei) T Chen	6	6
(Croatia) F Škugor	3	4
Q	(South Korea) S-w Kwon	3	3
2	(Slovenia) G Žemlja	6	6

Quarterfinals
Q	(Russia) E Karlovskiy	4	4
(Japan) Y Uchiyama	6	6
(Chinese Taipei) T Chen	4	4
2	(Slovenia) G Žemlja	6	6

Semifinals
(Japan) Y Uchiyama	3	6	6
2	(Slovenia) G Žemlja	6	4	3
