= 2012 All Japan Indoor Tennis Championships =

- Date: 5–11 March
- Edition: 16th
- Location: Kyoto, Japan

Champions

Singles
- (Japan) Tatsuma Ito

Doubles
- (Thailand) Sanchai Ratiwatana / (Thailand) Sonchat Ratiwatana
- All Japan Indoor Tennis Championships

The 2012 All Japan Indoor Tennis Championships was a professional tennis tournament played on clay courts. It was the 16th edition of the tournament which was part of the 2012 ATP Challenger Tour. It took place in Kyoto, Japan between 5 and 11 June March.

== ATP entrants ==
=== Seeds ===
Country	Player	Rank^{1}	Seed
JPN	Go Soeda	81	1
TUN	Malek Jaziri	104	2
JPN	Tatsuma Ito	105	3
JPN	Yūichi Sugita	174	4
THA	Danai Udomchoke	177	5
TPE	Yang Tsung-hua	181	6
AUS	Benjamin Mitchell	214	7
FIN	Harri Heliövaara	215	8

- ^{1} Rankings are as of February 27, 2012.

=== Other entrants ===
The following players received wildcards into the singles main draw:

- (Japan) Takuto Niki
- (Japan) Takao Suzuki
- (Japan) Shota Tagawa
- (Japan) Yasutaka Uchiyama

The following players received entry from the qualifying draw:

- (Australia) Matthew Barton
- (Australia) Brydan Klein
- (India) Purav Raja
- (Chinese Taipei) Yi Chu-huan

== Champions ==
=== Singles ===
- (Japan) Tatsuma Ito def. (Tunisia) Malek Jaziri, 6–7^{(5–7)}, 6–1, 6–2

=== Doubles ===
- (Thailand) Sanchai Ratiwatana / (Thailand) Sonchat Ratiwatana def. (Chinese Taipei) Hsieh Cheng-peng / (Chinese Taipei) Lee Hsin-han, 7–6^{(9–7)}, 6–3
