= 2017 Shimadzu All Japan Indoor Tennis Championships =

- Date: 20 – 26 February
- Edition: 21st
- Draw: 32S / 16D
- Prize money: $50,000+H
- Surface: carpet
- Location: Kyoto, Japan

Champions

Singles
- (Japan) Yasutaka Uchiyama

Doubles
- (Thailand) Sanchai Ratiwatana / (Thailand) Sonchat Ratiwatana
- Shimadzu All Japan Indoor Tennis Championships

The 2017 Shimadzu All Japan Indoor Tennis Championships was a professional tennis tournament played on carpet. It was the 21st edition of the tournament which will be part of the 2017 ATP Challenger Tour. It took place in Kyoto, Japan between 20 and 26 February.

== Singles main draw entrants ==
=== Seeds ===
Country	Player	Rank^{1}	Seed
JPN	Yūichi Sugita	115	1
SLO	Grega Žemlja	152	2
BEL	Ruben Bemelmans	154	3
CHN	Zhang Ze	158	4
AUS	Andrew Whittington	167	5
SLO	Blaž Kavčič	170	6
JPN	Tatsuma Ito	176	7
ARG	Agustín Velotti	186	8

- ^{1} Rankings are as of February 13, 2017.

=== Other entrants ===
The following players received wildcards into the singles main draw:

- (Japan) Toru Horie
- (Japan) Keito Uesugi
- (Japan) Yosuke Watanuki
- (Japan) Jumpei Yamasaki

The following player received entry into the singles main draw using a protected ranking:

- (Germany) Cedrik-Marcel Stebe

The following players received entry from the qualifying draw:

- (South Africa) Lloyd Harris
- (Russia) Evgeny Karlovskiy
- (South Korea) Kwon Soon-woo
- (Chinese Taipei) Jimmy Wang

The following player received entry as a lucky loser:

- (Japan) Shuichi Sekiguchi

== Champions ==
=== Singles ===
- (Japan) Yasutaka Uchiyama def. (Slovenia) Blaž Kavčič 6–3, 6–4.

=== Doubles ===
- (Thailand) Sanchai Ratiwatana / (Thailand) Sonchat Ratiwatana def. (Belgium) Ruben Bemelmans / (Belgium) Joris De Loore 4–6, 6–4, [10–7].
