= 2010 Shimadzu All Japan Indoor Tennis Championships =

- Date: March 8 – March 14
- Edition: 14th
- Location: Kyoto, Japan

Champions

Singles
- (Japan) Yuichi Sugita

Doubles
- (Austria) Martin Fischer / (Austria) Philipp Oswald
- Shimadzu All Japan Indoor Tennis Championships

The 2010 Shimadzu All Japan Indoor Tennis Championships was a professional tennis tournament played on indoor carpet courts. It was part of the 2010 ATP Challenger Tour. It took place in Kyoto, Japan between 8 and 14 March 2010.

== ATP entrants ==
=== Seeds ===
Nationality	Player	Ranking*	Seeding
POL	Michał Przysiężny	137	1
AUT	Martin Fischer	202	2
JPN	Tatsuma Ito	203	3
UKR	Sergei Bubka	209	4
AUS	Greg Jones	215	5
GER	Simon Stadler	217	6
NZL	Daniel King-Turner	227	7
GER	Andre Begemann	229	8

- Rankings are as of March 1, 2010.

=== Other entrants ===
The following players received wildcards into the singles main draw:

- (Japan) Toshihide Matsui
- (Japan) Junn Mitsuhashi
- (Japan) Hiroki Moriya
- (Japan) Kento Takeuchi

The following players received entry from the qualifying draw:

- (Japan) Yuichi Ito
- (Japan) Sho Katayama
- (Japan) Hiroki Kondo
- (Germany) Sebastian Rieschick

== Champions ==
=== Singles ===
(Japan) Yuichi Sugita def. (Australia) Matthew Ebden, 4–6, 6–4, 6–1

=== Doubles ===
(Austria) Martin Fischer / (Austria) Philipp Oswald def. (India) Divij Sharan / (India) Vishnu Vardhan, 6–1, 6–2
