= Purav Raja =

Indian tennis player

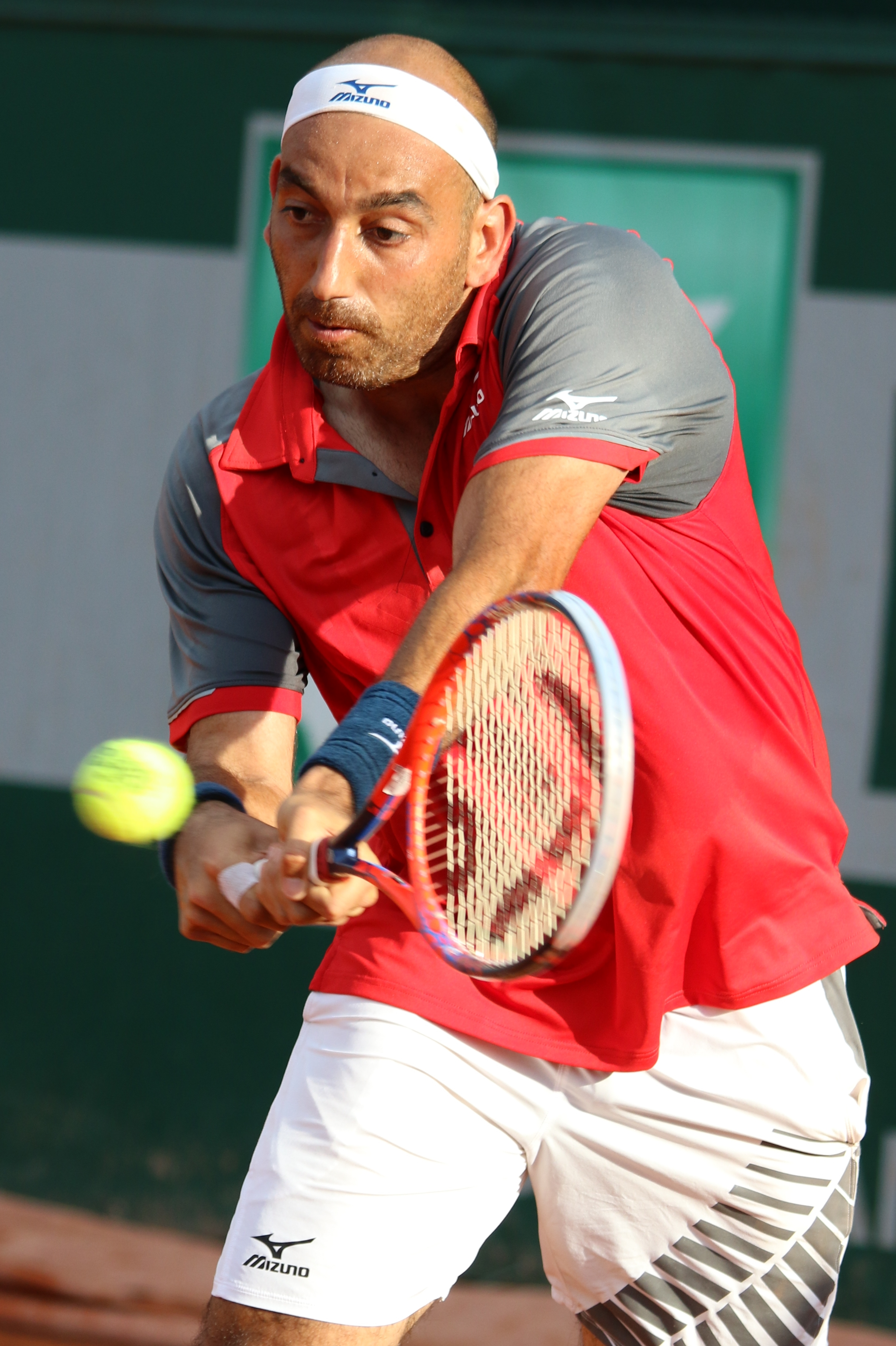
- Raja at the 2018 French Open
- Country (sports): India
- Residence: Mumbai, India
- Born: 7 December 1985 (age 40) Mumbai, India
- Height: 6 ft 0 in (183 cm)
- Turned pro: 2005
- Retired: 2023
- Plays: Right-handed
- Prize money: US$598,677

Singles
- Career record: 0–1
- Career titles: 0
- Highest ranking: No. 813 (30 July 2007)

Doubles
- Career record: 67–87
- Career titles: 2
- Highest ranking: No. 52 (17 July 2017)

Grand Slam doubles results
- Australian Open: 3R (2018)
- French Open: 3R (2017)
- Wimbledon: 2R (2017)
- US Open: 2R (2017)

Purav Raja (/ˈpʊəræv ˈrɑːdʒə/ POOR-av RAH-jə; born 7 December 1985) is a former Indian professional tennis player. He specializes in doubles and competes on the ATP World Tour. He has won two ATP doubles titles and represents India in the Davis Cup.

== Personal and early life ==
Purav Raja grew up in Mumbai and began playing tennis when he was 7 years old. He cites indoor carpet as his preferred surface, with his favourite shot being the drop shot. Raja was educated at Millfield in Somerset.

Raja is very active in the Ananda Ashran orphanage and The Fellowship of the Physically Handicapped in Mumbai. He splits his training between Mumbai and Bromley.

== Professional career ==
=== Early years ===
Raja turned pro in year 2005. He started with ITF tour finding negligible success in singles but continued to excel in doubles. In year 2007 he started emerging as a doubles specialist as he went on to win 4 ITF titles. He followed his success in year 2008 with four more ITF doubles titles. The same year he reached his first ATP Challenger doubles final at New Delhi Challenger 4 partnering with compatriot Rohan Gajjar. He won his first doubles ATP Challenger title at 2009 Karshi Challenger with his Australian Partner Sadik Kadir.

=== 2010–2012 ===
From year 2010 Raja started finding consistent success at ATP Challenger tour. In year 2010 he reached four Challenger finals and won a title at 2010 Dunlop World Challenge in Tokyo with partner Treat Conrad Huey. In 2011 Raja reached three challenger finals winning one of it at 2011 Trofeo Paolo Corazzi. His performance dipped slightly in 2012. He reached only two Challenger finals and could not win a title after three successful years.

=== 2013: Breakthrough, First ATP world tour title ===
In February, Raja made his Davis Cup debut against Korea. He partnered with Indian doubles legend Leander Paes and won his debut tie.

2013 proved to be a breakthrough year for Raja. He played most of the season with his most successful partner Divij Sharan. The pair performed consistently and reached 5 Challenger finals, winning a title at Kyoto Challenger, Japan. Raja and Divij found their biggest success by winning their first ATP world tour title at 2013 Claro Open in Bogotá, Colombia. They defeated second-seed French-Dutch combination of Édouard Roger-Vasselin and Igor Sijsling in the finals.

They also entered the qualifying draw at 2013 Wimbledon Championships and qualified for the main draw. They lost in the first round to Nicholas Monroe and Simon Stadler. This was the first match at a Grand Slam event for both Raja and Divij.

As a result of good run Raja entered top 100 rankings for the first time in his career. He also finished year inside top 100 doubles rankings at 90.

=== 2014 ===
Raja's performance dipped a bit in 2014. He could reach only two Challenger finals winning only one title. He won the title with Divij Sharan at Kyoto Challenger in Japan. His performance at ATP world tour level was also poor with his best finish as a semifinal appearance at Zagreb Indoors. As a result, his rankings fell out of top 100 and he finished year at 130.

=== 2015 ===
Raja started season on strong note. He reached to semifinals at Chennai Open. In February, he partnered with Fabrice Martin and made to the finals at Zagreb Indoors. This was Raja's second ATP world tour level final. They lost to second seeds Marin Draganja and Henri Kontinen in the finals. But after a strong performance at ATP world tour level Raja started to struggle with his form. He could make it to only one Challenger final in first half of the season. He made a good comeback in the second half. He won a title at Portorož Challenger and made it to the finals at Hua Hin Challenger. He finished the year ranked 93rd in doubles.

=== 2016: Second ATP world tour title ===
2016 proved to be a very good year for Raja. He played for most of the year with compatriot Divij Sharan and together they reached 6 ATP Challenger finals winning 4 of them. They won titles at the Manchester Trophy Challenger, Aegon Surbiton Trophy, Open Castilla y León and Pune Challenger. The pair also won their second ATP world tour title at Los Cabos Open, Mexico. They defeated the pair of Jonathan Erlich and Ken Skupski in the finals.

In Grand Slams, Raja played his first ever match of the French Open main draw along with Ivo Karlović of Croatia. But they crashed out in the opening round of the men's doubles event. The duo lost 1–6, 2–6 to ninth seeded Polish-Austrian pair of Łukasz Kubot and Alexander Peya.

=== 2017 ===
Raja continued his good form in 2017. He started the new season on a strong note by reaching his fourth ATP world tour final at the 2017 Chennai Open with partner Divij Sharan. In an all-Indian final they lost to the team of Rohan Bopanna and Jeevan Nedunchezhiyan.

He reached three Challenger finals and won all of them. He won the Bordeaux Challenger with Divij. In November, he won back to back titles in two consecutive weeks at Knoxville and Champaign with Leander Paes.

This was the first year in Raja's career where he played in the main draw of all four Grand Slams. He played with Divij Sharan in the first three slams of the year and partnered with Leander Paes for US Open. He crashed out in the opening round at the Australian Open, reached the third round at French Open and lost in the second round at Wimbledon and US Open.

In September, Raja played his second Davis Cup match with Rohan Bopanna in world group play-offs against Canada. But they lost to the pair of Daniel Nestor and Vasek Pospisil.

Raja reached his career best ranking of 52 on 17 July 2017 and finished the year with a doubles ranking of 60.

=== 2018 ===
Raja registered his best result at the Australian Open by reaching the third round. His partner at the event was Leander Paes.

Raja reached four ATP Challenger finals in 2018. He won two titles at Amex-Istanbul Challenger and Wolffkran Open while finishing as runner-up at Play in Challenger and Bengaluru Open.

On ATP tour he reached only two semi-finals and had a first round exit at 10 events. Due to the poor performance on the ATP world tour, he finished the year ranked 90th.

== ATP career finals ==
=== Doubles: 4 (2 titles, 2 runner-ups) ===
Legend Grand Slam tournaments (0–0) ATP World Tour Finals (0–0) ATP World Tour Masters 1000 (0–0) ATP World Tour 500 Series (0–0) ATP World Tour 250 Series (2–2)	Titles by surface Hard (2–2) Clay (0–0) Grass (0–0)	Titles by setting Outdoor (2–1) Indoor (0–1)

Result	W–L	Date	Tournament	Tier	Surface	Partner	Opponents	Score
Win	1–0	Jul 2013	Colombia Open, Colombia	250 Series	Hard	(India) Divij Sharan	(France) Édouard Roger-Vasselin (Netherlands) Igor Sijsling	7–6^{(7–4)}, 7–6^{(7–3)}
Loss	1–1	Feb 2015	Zagreb Indoors, Croatia	250 Series	Hard (i)	(France) Fabrice Martin	(Croatia) Marin Draganja (Finland) Henri Kontinen	4–6, 4–6
Win	2–1	Aug 2016	Los Cabos Open, Mexico	250 Series	Hard	(India) Divij Sharan	(Israel) Jonathan Erlich (United Kingdom) Ken Skupski	7–6^{(7–4)}, 7–6^{(7–3)}
Loss	2–2	Jan 2017	Chennai Open, India	250 Series	Hard	(India) Divij Sharan	(India) Rohan Bopanna (India) Jeevan Nedunchezhiyan	3–6, 4–6

== Challenger finals ==
Legend
ATP Challenger Tour (21–24)

=== Doubles: 44 (21–23) ===
Outcome	W–L	Date	Tournament	Surface	Partner	Opponents in the final	Score
Loss	0–1	Aug 2008	New Delhi 4, India	Hard	(India) Rohan Gajjar	(India) Harsh Mankad (India) Ashutosh Singh	6–4, 4–6, [9–11]
Win	1–1	Aug 2009	Karshi, Uzbekistan	Hard	(Australia) Sadik Kadir	(Latvia) Andis Juška (Latvia) Deniss Pavlovs	6–3, 7–6^{(7–4)}
Loss	1–2	Jun 2010	Rome 3, Italy	Clay	(Australia) Sadik Kadir	(Mexico) Santiago González (United States) Travis Rettenmaier	2–6, 4–6
Loss	1–3	Jun 2010	Reggio Emilia, Italy	Clay	(Australia) Sadik Kadir	(Austria) Philipp Oswald (Austria) Martin Slanar	2–6, 7–5, [6–10]
Loss	1–4	Aug 2010	Beijing, China	Hard	(Australia) Sadik Kadir	(Canada) Pierre-Ludovic Duclos (Russia) Artem Sitak	6–7^{(4–7)}, 6–7^{(5–7)}
Win	2–4	Nov 2010	Toyota, Japan	Carpet (i)	(Philippines) Treat Conrad Huey	(Japan) Tasuku Iwami (Japan) Hiroki Kondo	6–1, 6–2
Win	3–4	May 2011	Cremona, Italy	Hard	(Philippines) Treat Conrad Huey	(Poland) Tomasz Bednarek (Poland) Mateusz Kowalczyk	6–1, 6–2
Loss	3–5	Jul 2011	Recanati, Italy	Hard	(Italy) Federico Gaio	(Denmark) Frederik Nielsen (United Kingdom) Ken Skupski	4–6, 5–7
Loss	3–6	Oct 2011	Seoul, South Korea	Hard	(India) Divij Sharan	(Thailand) Sanchai Ratiwatana (Thailand) Sonchat Ratiwatana	4–6, 6–7^{(3–7)}
Loss	3–7	Jun 2012	Fürth, Germany	Clay	(Australia) Rameez Junaid	(Spain) Arnau Brugués Davi (Portugal) João Sousa	5–7, 7–6^{(7–4)}, [9–11]
Loss	3–8	Nov 2012	Loughborough, United Kingdom	Hard	(India) Divij Sharan	(United States) James Cerretani (Canada) Adil Shamasdin	4–6, 5–7
Win	4–8	Mar 2013	Kyoto, Japan	Carpet	(India) Divij Sharan	(Australia) Chris Guccione (Australia) Matt Reid	6–4, 7–5
Loss	4–9	Apr 2013	Leon, Mexico	Hard	(India) Divij Sharan	(Australia) Chris Guccione (Australia) Matt Reid	3–6, 5–7
Loss	4–10	May 2013	Johannesburg, South Africa	Hard	(India) Divij Sharan	(India) Prakash Amritraj (United States) Rajeev Ram	6–7^{(1–7)}, 6–7^{(1–7)}
Loss	4–11	Jun 2013	Nottingham, United Kingdom	Grass	(India) Divij Sharan	(Thailand) Sanchai Ratiwatana (Thailand) Sonchat Ratiwatana	7–6^{(7–5)}, 6–7^{(3–7)}, [8–10]
Loss	4–12	Oct 2013	Tashkent, Uzbekistan	Hard	(India) Divij Sharan	(Russia) Mikhail Elgin (Russia) Teymuraz Gabashvili	4–6, 4–6
Win	5–12	Mar 2014	Kyoto, Japan	Carpet	(India) Divij Sharan	(Thailand) Sanchai Ratiwatana (New Zealand) Michael Venus	5–7, 7–6^{(7–3)}, [10–4]
Loss	5–13	Aug 2014	Aptos, United States	Hard	(India) Sanam Singh	(Belgium) Ruben Bemelmans (Lithuania) Laurynas Grigelis	3–6, 6–4, [9–11]
Loss	5–14	Mar 2015	Guangzhou, China	Hard	(France) Fabrice Martin	(Spain) Daniel Muñoz de la Nava (Kazakhstan) Aleksandr Nedovyesov	2–6, 5–7
Win	6–14	Aug 2015	Portorož, Slovenia	Hard	(France) Fabrice Martin	(Belarus) Aliaksandr Bury (Sweden) Andreas Siljeström	7–6^{(7–5)}, 4–6, [18–16]
Loss	6–15	Nov 2015	Hua Hin, Thailand	Hard	(Germany) Andre Begemann	(Chinese Taipei) Lee Hsin-han (Chinese Taipei) Lu Yen-hsun	Walkover
Loss	6–16	Apr 2016	Savannah, United States	Clay	(India) Divij Sharan	(United States) Brian Baker (United States) Ryan Harrison	7–5, 6–7^{(4–7)}, [8–10]
Win	7–16	Jun 2016	Manchester, United Kingdom	Grass	(India) Divij Sharan	(United Kingdom) Ken Skupski (United Kingdom) Neal Skupski	6–3, 3–6, [11–9]
Win	8–16	Jun 2016	Surbiton, United Kingdom	Grass	(India) Divij Sharan	(United Kingdom) Ken Skupski (United Kingdom) Neal Skupski	6–4, 7–6^{(7–3)}
Win	9–16	Jul 2016	Segovia, Spain	Hard	(India) Divij Sharan	(Spain) Quino Muñoz (Japan) Akira Santillan	6–3, 4–6, [10–8]
Win	10–16	Oct 2016	Pune, India	Hard	(India) Divij Sharan	(Switzerland) Luca Margaroli (France) Hugo Nys	3–6, 6–3, [11–9]
Loss	10–17	Nov 2016	Bratislava, Slovakia	Hard	(India) Divij Sharan	(United Kingdom) Ken Skupski (United Kingdom) Neal Skupski	6–4, 3–6, [5–10]
Win	11–17	May 2017	Bordeaux, France	Clay	(India) Divij Sharan	(Mexico) Santiago González (New Zealand) Artem Sitak	6–4, 6–4
Win	12–17	Nov 2017	Knoxville, United States	Hard (i)	(India) Leander Paes	(United States) James Cerretani (Australia) John-Patrick Smith	7–6^{(7–4)}, 7–6^{(7–4)}
Win	13–17	Nov 2017	Champaign, United States	Hard (i)	(India) Leander Paes	(South Africa) Ruan Roelofse (United Kingdom) Joe Salisbury	6–3, 6–7^{(5–7)}, [10–5]
Loss	13–18	Mar 2018	Lille, France	Hard	(India) Jeevan Nedunchezhiyan	(France) Hugo Nys (Germany) Tim Pütz	6–7^{(3–7)}, 6–1, [7–10]
Win	14–18	Sep 2018	Istanbul, Turkey	Hard	(Australia) Rameez Junaid	(Kazakhstan) Timur Khabibulin (Ukraine) Vladyslav Manafov	7–6^{(7–4)}, 4–6, [10–7]
Win	15–18	Oct 2018	Ismaning, Germany	Carpet	(Croatia) Antonio Šančić	(Australia) Rameez Junaid (Netherlands) David Pel	5–7, 6–4, [10–5]
Loss	15–19	Nov 2018	Bangalore, India	Hard	(Croatia) Antonio Šančić	(Australia) Max Purcell (Australia) Luke Saville	6–7^{(3–7)}, 3–6
Win	16–19	Nov 2019	Kobe, Japan	Hard (i)	(India) Ramkumar Ramanathan	(Sweden) André Göransson (Indonesia) Christopher Rungkat	7–6^{(8–6)}, 6–3
Win	17–19	Nov 2019	Pune, India	Hard (i)	(India) Ramkumar Ramanathan	(India) Arjun Kadhe (India) Saketh Myneni	7–6^{(7–3)}, 6–3
Win	18–19	Feb 2020	Bangalore, India	Hard	(India) Ramkumar Ramanathan	(Australia) Matthew Ebden (India) Leander Paes	6–0, 6–3
Win	19–19	Oct 2021	Lisbon, Portugal	Clay	(India) Jeevan Nedunchezhiyan	(Portugal) Nuno Borges (Portugal) Francisco Cabral	7–6^{(7–5)}, 6–3
Loss	19–20	Nov 2021	Tenerife, Spain	Hard	(India) Jeevan Nedunchezhiyan	(Portugal) Nuno Borges (Portugal) Francisco Cabral	3–6, 4–6
Loss	19–21	Mar 2022	Biel/Bienne, Switzerland	Hard (i)	(India) Ramkumar Ramanathan	(France) Pierre-Hugues Herbert (France) Albano Olivetti	3–6, 4–6
Loss	19–22	Jul 2022	Indianapolis, USA	Hard (i)	(India) Divij Sharan	(Mexico) Hans Hach Verdugo (United States) Hunter Reese	6–7^{(3–7)}, 6–3, [7–10]
Win	20–22	Sep 2022	Istanbul, Turkey	Hard	(India) Divij Sharan	(India) Arjun Kadhe (Brazil) Fernando Romboli	6–4, 3–6, [10–8]
Loss	20–23	Oct 2022	Mouilleron-le-Captif, France	Hard (i)	(India) Divij Sharan	(Netherlands) Sander Arends (Netherlands) David Pel	7–6^{(7–1)}, 6–7^{(6–8)}, [6–10]
Win	21–23	Nov 2022	Helsinki, Finland	Hard (i)	(India) Divij Sharan	(United States) Reese Stalder (Greece) Petros Tsitsipas	6–7^{(5–7)}, 6–3, [10–8]
Loss	21–24	Mar 2023	Les Franqueses del Vallès, Spain	Hard	(India) Divij Sharan	(India) Anirudh Chandrasekar (India) Vijay Sundar Prashanth	5–7, 1–6

== Doubles performance timeline ==
Key
W	F	SF	QF	#R	RR	Q#	P#	DNQ	A	Z#	PO	G	S	B	NMS	NTI	P	NH

(W) winner; (F) finalist; (SF) semifinalist; (QF) quarterfinalist; (#R) rounds 4, 3, 2, 1; (RR) round-robin stage; (Q#) qualification round; (P#) preliminary round; (DNQ) did not qualify; (A) absent; (Z#) Davis/Fed Cup Zonal Group (with number indication) or (PO) play-off; (G) gold, (S) silver or (B) bronze Olympic/Paralympic medal; (NMS) not a Masters tournament; (NTI) not a Tier I tournament; (P) postponed; (NH) not held; (SR) strike rate (events won / competed); (W–L) win–loss record.
To avoid confusion and double counting, these charts are updated at the conclusion of a tournament or when the player's participation has ended.

Updated through the 2019 Wimbledon Championships.

Tournament	2013	2014	2015	2016	2017	2018	2019	SR	W–L
Australian Open	A	A	A	A	1R	3R	A	0/2	2–2
French Open	A	A	A	1R	3R	1R	A	0/3	2–3
Wimbledon	1R	1R	1R	A	2R	1R	1R	0/6	1–6
US Open	A	A	A	A	2R	1R	A	0/2	1–2
Win–loss	0–1	0–1	0–1	0–1	4–4	2–4	0–0	0/12	6–12
