= Kento Takeuchi =

Japanese tennis player (born 1987)

Kento Takeuchi 竹内 研人
- Full name: Kento Takeuchi
- Country (sports): Japan
- Residence: Kyoto, Japan
- Born: 19 December 1987 (age 37); Kyoto, Japan
- Plays: Left-handed (one handed-backhand)
- Prize money: US $179,045

Singles
- Career record: 0–1
- Career titles: 0; 2 ITFs
- Highest ranking: No. 378 (29 June 2015)

Doubles
- Career record: 0–0
- Career titles: 0; 1 ITF
- Highest ranking: No. 503 (17 March 2014)

Kento Takeuchi (竹内 研人, Takeuchi Kento, born 19 December 1987) is a Japanese former pro tennis player.

Takeuchi had a career high ATP singles ranking of No. 378 achieved on 29 June 2015 and a doubles ranking of No. 503 achieved on 17 March 2014.

Takeuchi made his ATP main draw debut at the 2014 Malaysian Open, Kuala Lumpur where he qualified for the main draw. He defeated Singekrawee Wattanakul and Bumpei Sato. He drew fellow Japanese player Go Soeda in the first round, but lost 2–6, 1–6.
