= Yasutaka Uchiyama =

Japanese tennis player (born 1992)

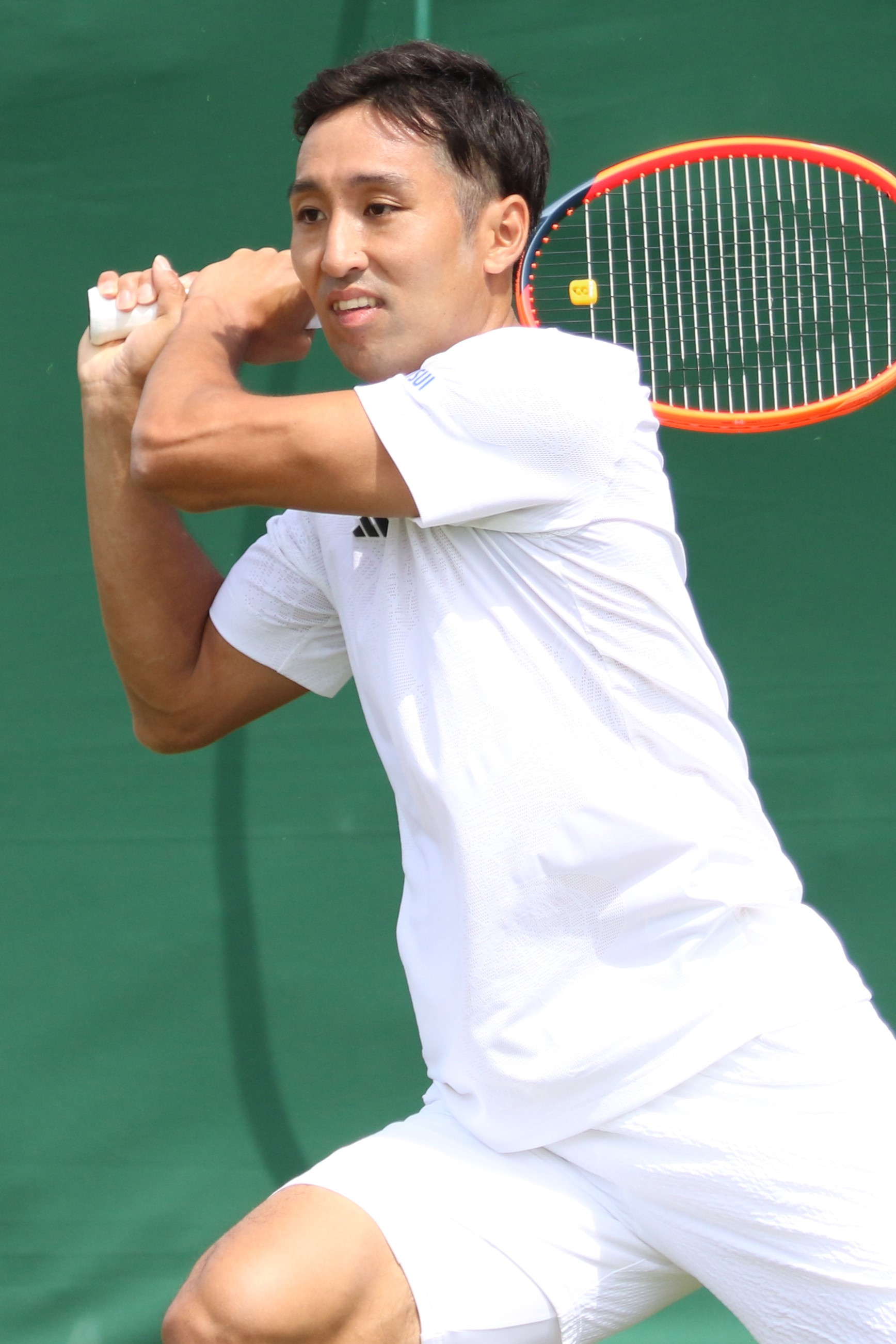
- Uchiyama at the 2023 Wimbledon Championships
- Country (sports): Japan
- Residence: Tokyo, Japan
- Born: 5 August 1992 (age 34) Sapporo, Japan
- Height: 1.83 m (6 ft 0 in)
- Turned pro: April 2011
- Plays: Right-handed (two-handed backhand)
- Prize money: US $ 1,777,866

Singles
- Career record: 13–28
- Career titles: 0
- Highest ranking: No. 78 (4 November 2019)
- Current ranking: No. 309 (29 December 2025)

Grand Slam singles results
- Australian Open: 1R (2020, 2021)
- French Open: 1R (2020, 2021)
- Wimbledon: 1R (2019, 2021)
- US Open: 1R (2020)

Doubles
- Career record: 12–24
- Career titles: 1
- Highest ranking: No. 102 (20 August 2018)

Grand Slam doubles results
- Australian Open: 1R (2020)
- Wimbledon: 1R (2018)
Medal record
Representing Japan
Men's tennis
Asian Games
Bronze medal – third place	2014 Incheon	Team Event
- Last updated on: 30 December 2025.

Yasutaka Uchiyama (内山 靖崇, Uchiyama Yasutaka; born 5 August 1992) is a Japanese tennis player who competes on the ATP Challenger Tour. He achieved a career-high ATP singles ranking of world No. 78 on 4 November 2019 and doubles ranking of No. 102 on 20 August 2018.

== Career ==
=== Juniors ===
As a junior Uchiyama compiled a win–loss record of 99–61 (and 77–56 in doubles), reaching as high as No. 12 in the combined world rankings in March 2010. He reached the final of the 2009 Australian Open Boys' Doubles with Mikhail Biryukov, losing to Francis Casey Alcantara and Hsieh Cheng-peng in the final.

=== 2013-2015 ===
Uchiyama made his Davis Cup debut for Japan in February 2013, in the Asia/Oceania Zone Group I first round against Indonesia in Tokyo. In the 2014 Davis Cup World Group first round against Canada in Tokyo, he played the doubles rubber with partner Kei Nishikori, winning over Canadian pair Daniel Nestor and Frank Dancevic. Japan defeated Canada 4–1 to advance to the quarterfinals in the World Group for the first time ever.

He reached the final of the Lexington Challenger in August 2015, losing to John Millman in three sets.

=== 2019: Best season: Major debut at Wimbledon, two ATP quarterfinals, Top 100 ===
He qualified on his seventh attempt at the 2019 Japan Open, his home tournament, and reached his second ATP Tour quarterfinal (after 2019 Brisbane) with wins over Benoît Paire and Radu Albot. As a result, he reached the top 100 at world No. 87 on 21 October 2019.

=== 2024: Third ATP quarterfinal, back to top 150 ===
Uchiyama won his sixth Challenger at the 2024 Busan Open. Ranked No. 160 at the 2024 Hangzhou Open, he reached the main draw as a qualifier, and then defeated lucky loser James McCabe and upset top seed Holger Rune, for his second top 20 and joint biggest career win (with world No. 14 Kyle Edmund win in 2019 Brisbane), to reach his third ATP Tour quarterfinal (after Brisbane and Tokyo in 2019).

== Singles performance timeline ==
Key
W	F	SF	QF	#R	RR	Q#	DNQ	A	NH

(W) winner; (F) finalist; (SF) semifinalist; (QF) quarterfinalist; (#R) rounds 4, 3, 2, 1; (RR) round-robin stage; (Q#) qualification round; (DNQ) did not qualify; (A) absent; (NH) not held; (SR) strike rate (events won / competed); (W–L) win–loss record.
To avoid confusion and double counting, these charts are updated at the conclusion of a tournament or when the player's participation has ended.

Tournament	2014	2015	2016	2017	2018	2019	2020	2021	2022	2023	2024	2025	2026	SR	W–L	Win %
Grand Slam tournaments
Australian Open	Q1	A	Q1	Q2	Q1	Q1	1R	1R	Q1	A	A	Q3	A	0 / 2	0–2	0%
French Open	A	A	A	Q2	Q2	Q1	1R	1R	A	A	Q2	Q1		0 / 2	0–2	0%
Wimbledon	Q2	A	A	Q1	Q1	1R	NH	1R	A	Q1	Q2	Q2		0 / 2	0–2	0%
US Open	Q1	Q1	A	Q1	A	Q3	1R	Q1	A	A	Q1	Q1		0 / 1	0–1	0%
Win–loss	0–0	0–0	0–0	0–0	0–0	0–1	0–3	0–3	0–0	0–0	0–0	0–0		0 / 7	0–7	0%
ATP Masters 1000
Indian Wells Masters	A	A	A	A	A	Q1	NH	A	A	A	A	Q2		0 / 0	0–0	–
Miami Open	A	A	A	A	A	A	NH	2R	A	A	A	Q1		0 / 1	1–1	50%
Monte Carlo Masters	A	A	A	A	A	A	NH	A	A	A	A	A		0 / 0	0–0	–
Madrid Open	A	A	A	A	A	A	NH	A	A	A	A	A		0 / 0	0-0	–
Italian Open	A	A	A	A	A	A	Q1	A	A	A	A	A		0 / 0	0–0	–
Canadian Open	A	A	A	A	A	A	NH	A	A	A	A	Q1		0 / 0	0–0	–
Cincinnati Masters	A	A	A	A	A	A	Q2	A	A	A	A	A		0 / 0	0–0	–
Shanghai Masters	Q1	A	A	A	A	A	NH			Q2	Q1	A		0 / 0	0–0	–
Paris Masters	A	A	A	A	A	A	A	A	A	A	A	A		0 / 0	0–0	–
Win–loss	0–0	0–0	0–0	0–0	0–0	0–0	0–0	1–1	0–0	0–0	0–0	0–0		0 / 1	1–1	50%

== ATP Tour finals ==
=== Doubles: 1 (1 title) ===
Legend Grand Slam (0–0) ATP Masters 1000 (0–0) ATP 500 (1–0) ATP 250 (0–0)	Finals by surface Hard (1–0) Clay (0–0) Grass (0–0)	Finals by setting Outdoor (1–0) Indoor (0–0)

Result	W–L	Date	Tournament	Tier	Surface	Partner	Opponents	Score
Win	1–0	Oct 2017	Japan Open, Japan	ATP 500	Hard	(Japan) Ben McLachlan	(United Kingdom) Jamie Murray (Brazil) Bruno Soares	6–4, 7–6^{(7–1)}

== ATP Challenger and ITF Futures/World Tennis Tour finals ==
=== Singles: 30 (16 titles, 14 runner-ups) ===
Legend ATP Challenger Tour (7–6) ITF Futures/WTT (9–8)	Finals by surface Hard (13–10) Clay (2–4) Grass (0–0) Carpet (1–0)

Result	W–L	Date	Tournament	Tier	Surface	Opponent	Score
Win	1–0	Apr 2010	Japan F4, Tsukuba	Futures	Hard	(Japan) Shuichi Sekiguchi	7-5, 6–1
Win	2–0	Oct 2011	Australia F10, Port Pirie	Futures	Hard	(Japan) Hiroki Moriya	7-6^{(8–6)}, 6–4
Win	3–0	Mar 2012	Japan F1, Nishitama-Tokyo	Futures	Hard	(Japan) Hiroki Kondo	6-2, 7-6^{(7–5)}
Loss	3–1	Apr 2012	Japan F3, Kofu	Futures	Hard	(Japan) Hiroki Moriya	1-6, 4–6
Win	4–1	Apr 2012	Japan F4, Tsukuba	Futures	Hard	(Chinese Taipei) Huang Liang-chi	7-5, 6–4
Loss	4–2	Jul 2012	Japan F7, Sapporo	Futures	Clay	(South Korea) Nam Hyun-woo	2-6, 1–6
Loss	4–3	Jun 2013	Japan F7, Sapporo	Futures	Clay	(Japan) Shuichi Sekiguchi	4-6, 6–2, 5–7
Loss	4–4	Oct 2013	Australia F10, Sydney	Futures	Hard	(Australia) Luke Saville	6-4, 4–6, 4–6
Win	5–4	Dec 2013	Thailand F4, Bangkok	Futures	Hard	(Australia) Luke Saville	6-1, 3–6, 6–1
Loss	5–5	Jun 2014	Japan F8, Sapporo	Futures	Clay	(Japan) Yoshihito Nishioka	4-6, 3–6
Loss	5–6	Mar 2015	Japan F3, Kofu	Futures	Hard	(South Korea) Yongkyu Lim	6-7^{(6–8)}, 3–6
Win	6–6	Apr 2015	Japan F4, Tsukuba	Futures	Hard	(Japan) Takuto Niki	6-1, 6–2
Loss	6–7	May 2015	Spain F15, Santa Margarida de Montbui	Futures	Hard	(Spain) Gerard Granollers-Pujol	7-6^{(7–1)},6-7^{(4–7)}, 3–6
Win	7–7	Jun 2015	Bulgaria F2, Burgas	Futures	Clay	(Bulgaria) Dimitar Kuzmanov	5-7, 6–4, 6–2
Win	8–7	Jun 2015	Japan F8, Sapporo	Futures	Clay	(Japan) Sho Katayama	6-2, 6–3
Loss	0–1	Aug 2015	Lexington, USA	Challenger	Hard	(Australia) John Millman	3–6, 6–3, 4–6
Loss	8–8	Jun 2016	Japan F6, Karuizawa	Futures	Clay	(South Korea) Duckhee Lee	6-7^{(5–7)}, 3–6
Win	1–1	Feb 2017	Kyoto, Japan	Challenger	Carpet (i)	(Slovenia) Blaž Kavčič	6–3, 6–4
Win	2–1	Mar 2018	Yokohama, Japan	Challenger	Hard	(Japan) Tatsuma Ito	2–6, 6–3, 6–4
Win	3–1	Sep 2018	Zhangjiagang, China	Challenger	Hard	(Chinese Taipei) Jason Jung	6–2, 6–2
Loss	3–2	Jul 2019	Granby, Canada	Challenger	Hard	(United States) Ernesto Escobedo	6–7^{(5–7)}, 4–6
Win	4–2	Sep 2019	Shanghai, China	Challenger	Hard	(China) Wu Di	6–4, 7–6^{(7–4)}
Win	5–2	Oct 2019	Ningbo, China	Challenger	Hard	(Canada) Steven Diez	6–1, 6–3
Loss	5–3	Nov 2019	City of Playford, Australia	Challenger	Hard	(Australia) James Duckworth	6–7^{(2–7)}, 4–6
Loss	5–4	Aug 2021	Manacor, Spain	Challenger	Hard	(Slovakia) Lukáš Lacko	7-5, 6-7^{(8–10)}, 1–6
Win	9–8	May 2022	M25 Monastir, Tunisia	WTT	Hard	(Australia) Akira Santillan	7-6^{(7–3)}, 6-7^{(5–7)}, 6–3
Win	6–4	Apr 2024	Busan, South Korea	Challenger	Hard	(South Korea) Hong Seong-chan	7–6^{(7–4)}, 6–3
Win	7–4	Aug 2024	Zhangjiagang, China (2)	Challenger	Hard	(Estonia) Mark Lajal	6–7^{(4–7)}, 6–2, 6–2
Loss	7–5	Sep 2025	Shanghai, China	Challenger	Hard	(Italy) Giulio Zeppieri	6–7^{(2–7)}, 5–7
Loss	7–6	Mar 2026	Yokkaichi, Japan	Challenger	Hard	(Japan) Rio Noguchi	7–5, 6–7^{(5–7)}, 3–6

=== Doubles: 12 (4 titles, 8 runner-ups) ===
Legend ATP Challenger Tour (4–8) ITF Futures/WTT (0–0)	Finals by surface Hard (3–4) Clay (0–1) Grass (0–0) Carpet (1–3)

Result	W–L	Date	Tournament	Tier	Surface	Partner	Opponents	Score
Loss	0–1	Aug 2012	Qarshi, Uzbekistan	Challenger	Hard	(Australia) Brydan Klein	(Chinese Taipei) Lee Hsin-han (Chinese Taipei) Peng Hsien-yin	6–7 ^{(5–7)}, 6–4, [4–10]
Loss	0–2	May 2013	Kunming, China	Challenger	Hard	(Japan) Go Soeda	(Australia) Samuel Groth (Australia) John-Patrick Smith	4–6, 1–6
Win	1–2	Jan 2014	Maui, USA	Challenger	Hard	(United States) Denis Kudla	(United States) Daniel Kosakowski (United States) Nicolas Meister	6–3, 6–2
Win	2–2	Nov 2014	Toyota, Japan	Challenger	Carpet (i)	(Japan) Toshihide Matsui	(Japan) Bumpei Sato (Chinese Taipei) Yang Tsung-hua	7–6 ^{(8–6)}, 6–2
Loss	2–3	Mar 2015	Kyoto, Japan	Challenger	Carpet (i)	(Japan) Go Soeda	(Australia) Benjamin Mitchell (Australia) Jordan Thompson	3–6, 2–6
Loss	2–4	Apr 2015	Saint-Brieuc, France	Challenger	Hard (i)	(Poland) Andriej Kapaś	(France) Grégoire Burquier (France) Alexandre Sidorenko	3–6, 4–6
Loss	2–5	Feb 2016	Kyoto, Japan	Challenger	Carpet (i)	(Japan) Go Soeda	(China) Gong Maoxin (Chinese Taipei) Yi Chu-huan	3–6, 6–7^{(7–9)}
Loss	2–6	Jun 2016	Blois, France	Challenger	Clay	(China) Gong Maoxin	(Germany) Alexander Satschko (Germany) Simon Stadler	3–6, 6–7^{(2–7)}
Win	3–6	Nov 2017	Kobe, Japan	Challenger	Hard (i)	(Japan) Ben McLachlan	(India) Jeevan Nedunchezhiyan (Indonesia) Christopher Rungkat	4–6, 6–3, [10–8]
Loss	3–7	Feb 2018	Kyoto, Japan	Challenger	Carpet (i)	(Japan) Go Soeda	(Australia) Luke Saville (Australia) Jordan Thompson	3–6, 7–5, [6–10]
Loss	3–8	Jan 2022	Columbus, USA	Challenger	Hard (i)	(Switzerland) Luca Margaroli	(United States) Tennys Sandgren (Denmark) Mikael Torpegaard	7-5, 4–6, [5-10]
Win	4–8	Apr 2023	Seoul, South Korea	Challenger	Hard	(Australia) Max Purcell	(South Korea) Chung Yun-seong (Japan) Yuta Shimizu	6–1, 6–4

== Junior Grand Slam finals ==
=== Doubles: 1 (1 runner-up) ===
Result	Year	Tournament	Surface	Partner	Opponents	Score
Loss	2009	Australian Open	Hard	(Russia) Mikhail Biryukov	(Philippines) Francis Alcantara (Chinese Taipei) Hsieh Cheng-peng	4–6, 2–6
