= Hiroki Kondo (tennis) =

Japanese tennis player (born 1982)

Hiroki Kondo 近藤 大生
- Country (sports): Japan
- Residence: Aichi Prefecture, Japan
- Born: 5 November 1982 (age 43) Kariya, Aichi, Japan
- Height: 1.77 m (5 ft 9 1/2 in)
- Turned pro: 2001
- Plays: Right-handed (two handed backhand)
- Coach: Masakazu Kuwabara
- Prize money: $180,617

Singles
- Career record: 1–3
- Career titles: 0
- Highest ranking: No. 275 (4 November 2013)

Grand Slam singles results
- Australian Open: Q1 (2014)

Doubles
- Career record: 1–4
- Career titles: 0
- Highest ranking: No. 179 (12 April 2010)

Hiroki Kondo
Medal record

Representing Japan

Men's Tennis

Asian Games
Bronze medal – third place	2010 Guangzhou	Mixed Doubles

East Asian Games
Bronze medal – third place	2009 Hong Kong	Doubles

Hiroki Kondo (近藤 大生, Kondo Hiroki; born 5 November 1982) is a Japanese tennis player. In April 2010, he reached his highest ATP doubles ranking of World No. 179.

== Tennis career ==
=== Juniors ===
As a junior, Kondo reached as high as No. 23 in the junior world singles rankings in January 2000 (and No. 11 in doubles). That year, he competed in the boys' singles and doubles at the French Open, Wimbledon and the US Open, reaching the third round in singles and the quarterfinals in doubles at the latter.

=== Pro tour ===
Kondo has won 3 Challenger events in doubles. At the age of 31, he finally competed at a grand slam event in singles, participating in the qualification rounds at the 2014 Australian Open.

== Doubles finals: 6 (3–3) ==
Legend Grand Slam tournaments (0/0) ATP World Tour Finals (0/0) ATP World Tour Masters 1000 (0/0) ATP World Tour 500 Series (0/0) ATP World Tour 250 Series (0/0) ATP Challenger Tour (3/3)	Titles by surface Hard (2/1) Grass (0/0) Clay (0/0) Carpet (1/2)

Outcome	No.	Date	Tournament	Surface	Partnering	Opponents in the final	Score
Winner	1.	19 November 2007	Yokohama, Japan	Hard	(Japan) Go Soeda	(Japan) Satoshi Iwabuchi (Japan) Toshihide Matsui	6–7^{(5)}, 6–3, [11–9]
Runner-up	2.	3 March 2008	Kyoto, Japan	Carpet	(Japan) Go Soeda	(Germany) Dieter Kindlmann (Austria) Martin Slanar	1–6, 5–7
Winner	3.	14 July 2008	Moncton, Canada	Hard	(Japan) Go Soeda	(Canada) Daniel Chu (Canada) Adil Shamasdin	6–2, 2–6, [12–10]
Runner-up	4.	4 August 2008	New Delhi, India	Hard	(Japan) Tasuku Iwami	(United Kingdom) Joshua Goodall (United Kingdom) James Ward	1–6, 5–7
Runner-up	5.	22 November 2010	Toyota City, Japan	Carpet	(Japan) Tasuku Iwami	(Philippines) Treat Conrad Huey (India) Purav Raja	1–6, 2–6
Winner	6.	26 November 2011	Toyota City, Japan	Carpet	(Chinese Taipei) Yi Chu-huan	(China) Gao Peng (China) Gao Wan	6–4, 6–1
