= Shimadzu All Japan Indoor Tennis Championships =

Tournament information
- Founded: 1964
- Location: Kyoto, Japan
- Venue: Hannaryz Arena (1997–2013); Shimadzu Arena Kyoto (since 2014)
- Surface: Hard / Indoor
- Website: Website
ATP Tour
- Category: ATP Challenger Tour
- Draw: 32S/32Q/16D
- Prize money: $35,000+H
WTA Tour
- Category: ITF Women's Circuit
- Draw: 32S/32Q/16D
- Prize money: $60,000

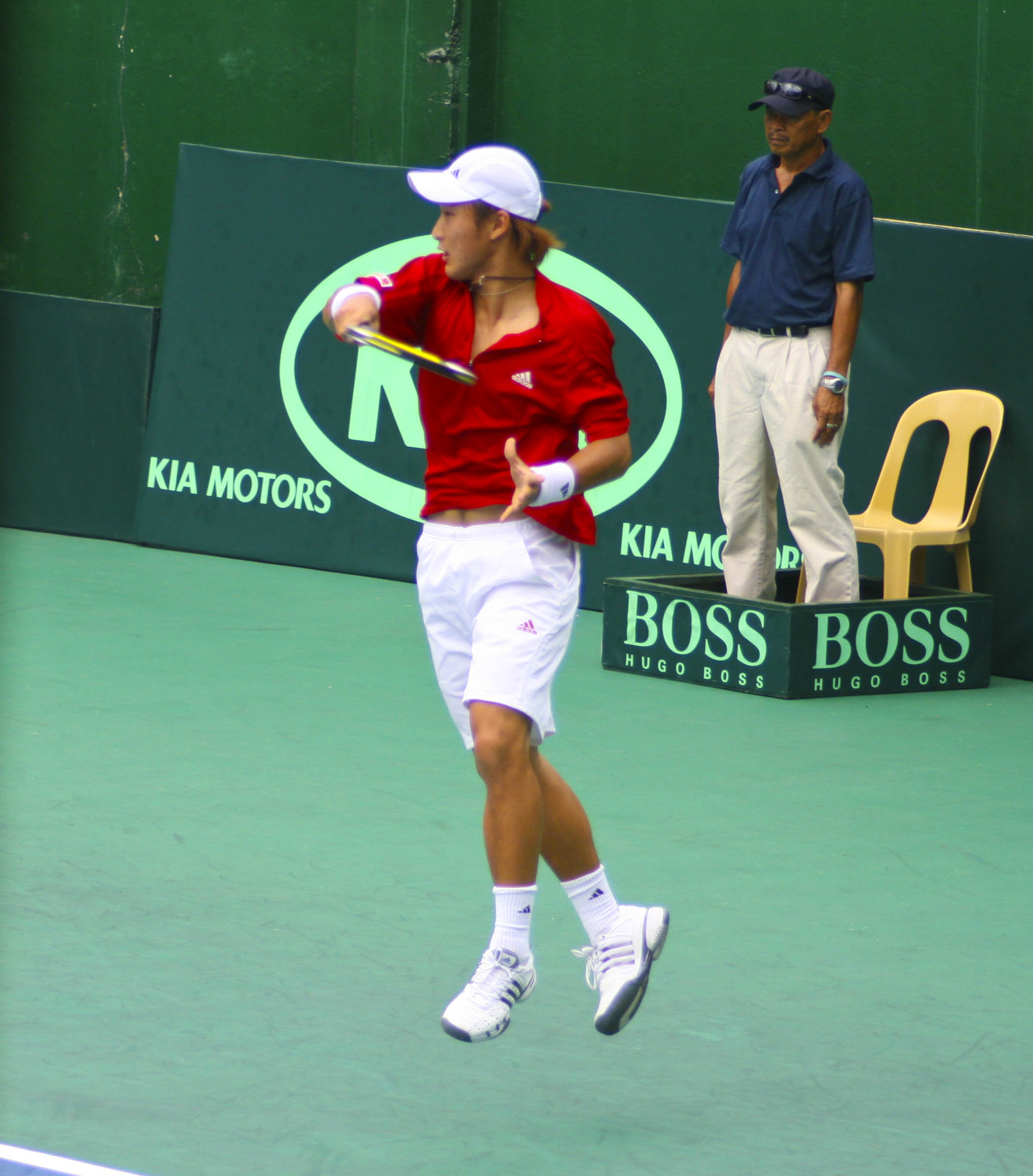
2008 singles winner Go Soeda from Fujisawa, Japan

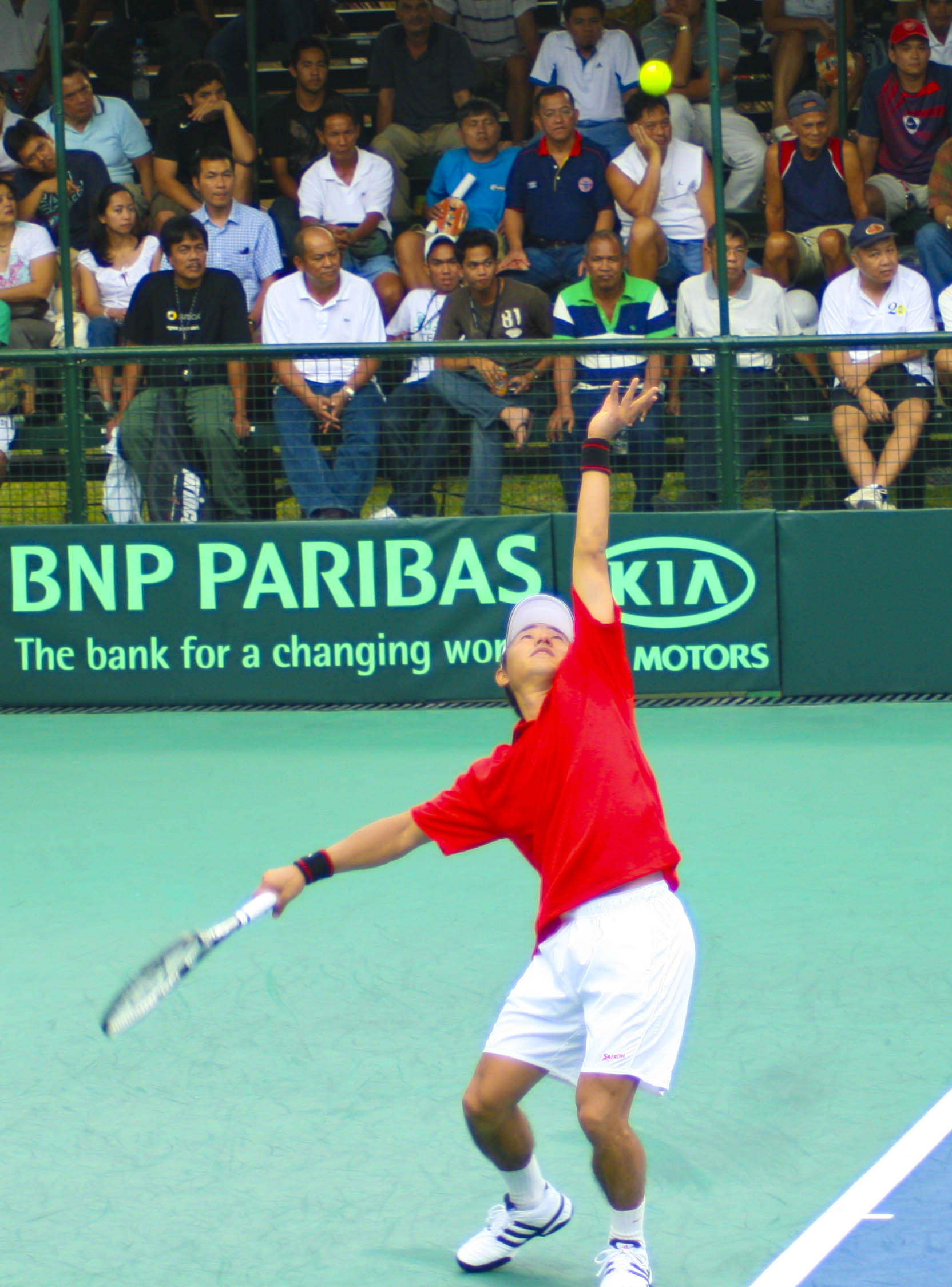
Takao Suzuki reached three singles finals, winning in 2002, 2007, losing in 2009, and three doubles finals, winning in 1998, losing in 1997, 2009

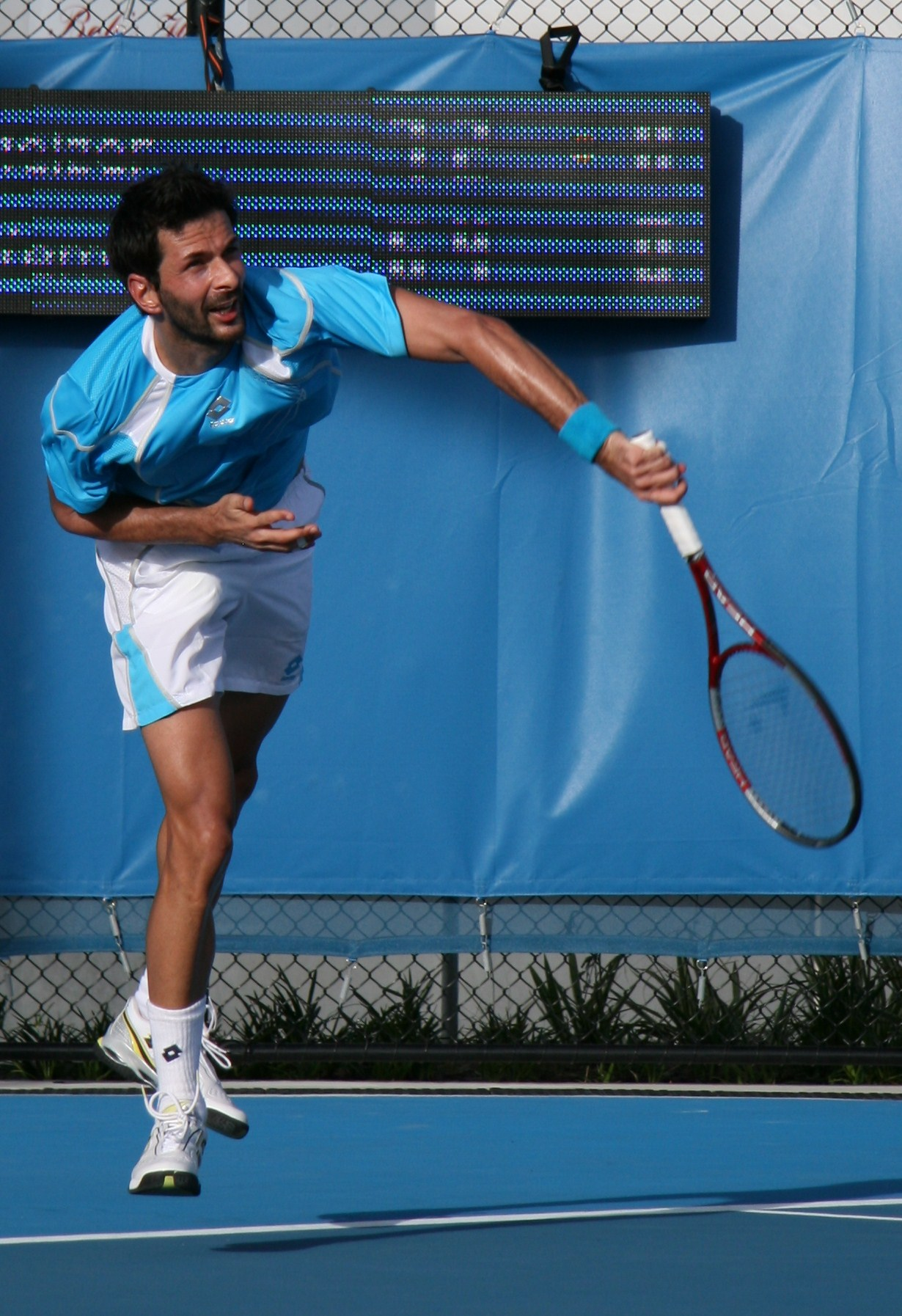
Julian Knowle, like Ullyett and Suzuki, won both the singles and the doubles, but remains the only one to have done so in the same year, in 1999

The Shimadzu All Japan Indoor Tennis Championships (島津全日本室内テニス選手権大会, Shimazu Zen Nihon Shitsunai Tenisu Senshuken Taikai) is a professional tennis tournament played on indoor carpet courts, founded as the All Japan Indoors in 1964. It is currently part of the International Tennis Federation (ITF) ITF Women's Tour and it is held annually in Kyoto, Japan. From 1997 to 2018, it was part of the Association of Tennis Professionals (ATP) Challenger Tour.

== Past finals ==
=== Women's singles ===
Year	Champion	Runner-up	Score
2026	(Japan) Hayu Kinoshita	(Japan) Ena Shibahara	7–5, 6–1
2025	(Japan) Sara Saito	(Japan) Himeno Sakatsume	6–4, 7–6^{(7–2)}
2023 - 2024	Not held		
2022	(Japan) Miyu Kato	(United Kingdom) Yuriko Miyazaki	6–4, 2–6, 6–2
2021	Cancelled due to COVID-19 pandemic in Japan		
2020	(China) Xun Fangying	(Netherlands) Indy de Vroome	3–6, 6–3, 7–6^{(8–6)}
2019	(Switzerland) Ylena In-Albon	(China) Zhang Kailin	6–2, 6–3

=== Men's singles ===
Year	Champion	Runner-up	Score
2018	(Australia) John Millman	(Australia) Jordan Thompson	7–5, 6–1
2017	(Japan) Yasutaka Uchiyama	(Slovenia) Blaž Kavčič	6–3, 6–4
2016	(Japan) Yūichi Sugita	(China) Zhang Ze	5–7, 6–3, 6–4
2015	(Poland) Michał Przysiężny	(Australia) John Millman	6–3, 3–6, 6–3
2014	(Austria) Martin Fischer	(Japan) Tatsuma Ito	3–6, 7–5, 6–4
2013	(Australia) John Millman	(Switzerland) Marco Chiudinelli	4–6, 6–4, 7–6^{(7–2)}
2012	(Japan) Tatsuma Ito	(Tunisia) Malek Jaziri	6–7^{(5–7)}, 6–1, 6–2
2011	(Germany) Dominik Meffert	(Germany) Cedrik-Marcel Stebe	4–6, 6–4, 6–2
2010	(Japan) Yuichi Sugita	(Australia) Matthew Ebden	4–6, 6–4, 6–1
2009	(Ukraine) Sergei Bubka	(Japan) Takao Suzuki	7–6^{(8–6)}, 6–4
2008	(Japan) Go Soeda	(Germany) Matthias Bachinger	7–6^{(7–0)}, 2–6, 6–4
2007	(Japan) Takao Suzuki	(Germany) Dieter Kindlmann	2–6, 7–5, 6–1
2006	(France) Nicolas Mahut	(Chinese Taipei) Yen-hsun Lu	6–4, 6–1
2005	(Czech Republic) Robin Vik	(Czech Republic) Pavel Šnobel	6–4, 6–4
2004	(Czech Republic) Michal Tabara	(Chinese Taipei) Yen-hsun Lu	7–6^{(7–5)}, 4–3 retired
2003	(Czech Republic) Michal Tabara	(Israel) Noam Behr	6–2, 6–2
2002	(Japan) Takao Suzuki	(Croatia) Mario Ančić	6–7^{(4–7)}, 6–2, 6–2
2001	(Netherlands) John van Lottum	(Germany) Michael Kohlmann	6–7^{(3–7)}, 6–4, 7–5
2000	(Zimbabwe) Kevin Ullyett	(United Kingdom) Arvind Parmar	6–7^{(3–7)}, 6–4, 6–4
1999	(Austria) Julian Knowle	(Japan) Gouichi Motomura	6–1, 6–2
1998	(Germany) Michael Kohlmann	(United States) Steve Campbell	7–6, 3–6, 6–3
1997	(Germany) Carsten Arriens	(India) Mahesh Bhupathi	3–6, 6–2, 7–6

=== Women's doubles ===
Year	Champion	Runner-up	Score
2026	(Belgium) Sofia Costoulas; Sofya Lansere	(Japan) Hayu Kinoshita (Japan) Sara Saito	6–2, 6–4
2025	(Japan) Saki Imamura (South Korea) Park So-hyun	(Japan) Momoko Kobori (Japan) Ayano Shimizu	7–5, 6–4
2023 - 2024	Not held		
2022	(Chinese Taipei) Liang En-shuo (Chinese Taipei) Wu Fang-hsien	(Japan) Momoko Kobori (Thailand) Luksika Kumkhum	2–6, 7–6^{(7–5)}, [10–2]
2021	Cancelled due to COVID-19 pandemic in Japan		
2020	(Japan) Erina Hayashi (Japan) Moyuka Uchijima	(Chinese Taipei) Hsieh Yu-chieh (Japan) Minori Yonehara	7–5, 5–7, [10–6]
2019	(Japan) Eri Hozumi (Japan) Moyuka Uchijima	(Chinese Taipei) Chen Pei-hsuan (Chinese Taipei) Wu Fang-hsien	6–4, 6–3

=== Men's doubles ===
Year	Champions	Runners-up	Score
2018	(Australia) Luke Saville (Australia) Jordan Thompson	(Japan) Go Soeda (Japan) Yasutaka Uchiyama	6–3, 5–7, [10–6]
2017	(Thailand) Sanchai Ratiwatana (Thailand) Sonchat Ratiwatana	(Belgium) Ruben Bemelmans (Belgium) Joris De Loore	4–6, 6–4, [10–7]
2016	(China) Gong Maoxin (Chinese Taipei) Yi Chu-huan	(Japan) Go Soeda (Japan) Yasutaka Uchiyama	6–3, 7–6^{(9–7)}
2015	(Australia) Benjamin Mitchell (Australia) Jordan Thompson	(Japan) Go Soeda (Japan) Yasutaka Uchiyama	6–3, 6–2
2014	(India) Purav Raja (India) Divij Sharan	(Thailand) Sanchai Ratiwatana (New Zealand) Michael Venus	5–7, 7–6^{(7–3)}, [10–4]
2013	(India) Purav Raja (India) Divij Sharan	(Australia) Chris Guccione (Australia) Matt Reid	6–4, 7–5
2012	(Thailand) Sanchai Ratiwatana (Thailand) Sonchat Ratiwatana	(Chinese Taipei) Hsieh Cheng-peng (Chinese Taipei) Lee Hsin-han	7–6^{(9–7)}, 6–3
2011	(Germany) Dominik Meffert (Germany) Simon Stadler	(Germany) Andre Begemann (Australia) James Lemke	7–5, 2–6, [10–7]
2010	(Austria) Martin Fischer (Austria) Philipp Oswald	(India) Divij Sharan (India) Vishnu Vardhan	6–1, 6–2
2009	(Pakistan) Aisam-ul-Haq Qureshi (Austria) Martin Slanar	(Japan) Tatsuma Ito (Japan) Takao Suzuki	6–7^{(7–9)}, 7–6^{(7–3)}, 10–6
2008	(Germany) Dieter Kindlmann (Austria) Martin Slanar	(Japan) Hiroki Kondo (Japan) Go Soeda	6–1, 7–5
2007	(Thailand) Sanchai Ratiwatana (Thailand) Sonchat Ratiwatana	(United States) Rajeev Ram (United States) Bobby Reynolds	6–4, 6–3
2006	(Australia) Alun Jones (United Kingdom) Jonathan Marray	(India) Prakash Amritraj (India) Rohan Bopanna	6–4, 3–6, 14–12
2005	(Czech Republic) Pavel Šnobel (Czech Republic) Michal Tabara	(Japan) Joji Miyao (Japan) Atsuo Ogawa	6–2, 6–7^{(4–7)}, 7–5
2004	(South Africa) Rik de Voest (Netherlands) Fred Hemmes Jr.	(Chinese Taipei) Yen-hsun Lu (United States) Jason Marshall	6–3, 6–7^{(8–10)}, 6–4
2003	(Israel) Amir Hadad (Israel) Andy Ram	(Czech Republic) Jan Hájek (Chinese Taipei) Yeu-tzuoo Wang	3–6, 6–3, 6–1
2002	(Finland) Tuomas Ketola (Germany) Alexander Waske	(Croatia) Mario Ančić (Croatia) Lovro Zovko	6–4, 6–4
2001	(Israel) Noam Behr (Israel) Noam Okun	(United States) Kelly Gullett (United States) Brandon Hawk	6–3, 7–5
2000	(Slovakia) Martin Hromec (United Kingdom) Tom Spinks	(Japan) Yaoki Ishii (Japan) Satoshi Iwabuchi	6–4, 7–6^{(7–5)}
1999	(Austria) Julian Knowle (Switzerland) Lorenzo Manta	(Italy) Giorgio Galimberti (South Korea) Hyung-taik Lee	6–1, 6–7, 6–2
1998	(Japan) Takao Suzuki (Zimbabwe) Kevin Ullyett	(Mexico) Óscar Ortiz (Venezuela) Maurice Ruah	4–6, 6–1, 6–4
1997	(India) Mahesh Bhupathi (Zimbabwe) Wayne Black	(Japan) Satoshi Iwabuchi (Japan) Takao Suzuki	6–4, 6–7, 6–1
