= 2013 Aberto Rio Preto – Singles =

Singles
- 2013 Aberto Rio Preto

Final
- Champion: (Brazil) João Souza
- Runner-up: (Colombia) Alejandro González
- Score: 7–6^{(7–0)}, 6–3

Events
| Singles | Doubles |
| ← 2011 · | Aberto Rio Preto |

Ricardo Mello was the last champion of the event in 2011, but decided not to compete.
João Souza won the title 7–6^{(7–0)}, 6–3 against Alejandro González

== Seeds ==
1. (Slovenia) Blaž Kavčič (quarterfinals)
2. (Colombia) Alejandro González (final)
3. (Argentina) Guido Pella (semifinals)
4. (Portugal) Gastão Elias (semifinals)
5. (Brazil) Rogério Dutra da Silva (quarterfinals)
6. (Brazil) João Souza (champion)
7. (Brazil) Guilherme Clezar (second round)
8. (Brazil) André Ghem (second round)

== Draw ==
=== Key ===
- Q = Qualifier
- WC = Wild card
- LL = Lucky loser
- Alt = Alternate
- SE = Special exempt
- PR = Protected ranking
- ITF = ITF entry
- JE = Junior exempt
- w/o = Walkover
- r = Retired
- d = Defaulted
- SR = Special ranking

=== Finals ===
Semifinals
6 | (Brazil) João Souza | 1 | 6 | 6
4 | (Portugal) Gastão Elias | 6 | 4 | 2
3 | (Argentina) Guido Pella | 4 | 5
2 | (Colombia) Alejandro González | 6 | 7

Final
6 | (Brazil) João Souza | 7^{7} | 6
2 | (Colombia) Alejandro González | 6^{0} | 3

=== Top half ===
First round
1 | (Slovenia) B Kavčič | 7^{7} | 6
(Canada) S Diez | 6^{2} | 0
(Portugal) P Sousa | 2 | 6 | 6
Q | (Brazil) Wilson Leite | 6 | 2 | 3
(Dominican Republic) V Estrella Burgos | 6 | 6
(United States) B Fratangelo | 0 | 3
(Brazil) L Kirche | 2 | 7^{7} | 4
6 | (Brazil) J Souza | 6 | 6^{2} | 6
4 | (Portugal) G Elias | 7^{7} | 6
WC | (Brazil) A Laranja | 6^{4} | 4
(Dominican Republic) J Hernández | 4 | 0
(Colombia) N Barrientos | 6 | 6
(Brazil) T Alves | 6^{5} | 6 | 6
(Colombia) C Salamanca | 7^{7} | 0 | 1
(Portugal) R Machado | 3 | 1
8 | (Brazil) A Ghem | 6 | 6

Second round
1 | (Slovenia) B Kavčič | 3 | 6 | 6
(Portugal) P Sousa | 6 | 4 | 4
(Dominican Republic) V Estrella Burgos | 6 | 5 | 2
6 | (Brazil) J Souza | 3 | 7 | 6
4 | (Portugal) G Elias | 6 | 4 | 6
(Colombia) N Barrientos | 1 | 6 | 3
(Brazil) T Alves | 0 | 6 | 7
8 | (Brazil) A Ghem | 6 | 1 | 5

Quarterfinals
1 | (Slovenia) B Kavčič | 5 | 5
6 | (Brazil) J Souza | 7 | 7
4 | (Portugal) G Elias | 6 | 7
(Brazil) T Alves | 0 | 5

Semifinals
6 | (Brazil) J Souza | 1 | 6 | 6
4 | (Portugal) G Elias | 6 | 4 | 2

=== Bottom half ===
First round
7 | (Brazil) G Clezar | 6 | 6
Q | (Brazil) F Romboli | 0 | 1
(Brazil) R Hocevar | 3 | 6 | 4
(Brazil) T Monteiro | 6 | 4 | 6
WC | (Brazil) M Zormann | 6 | 4 | 6^{5}
Q | (Brazil) T Turini | 2 | 6 | 7^{7}
(Venezuela) D Souto | 5 | 3
3 | (Argentina) G Pella | 7 | 6
5 | (Brazil) R Dutra da Silva | 6 | 7
(Spain) C Gómez-Herrera | 2 | 5
WC | (Brazil) M Demoliner | 6 | 6
WC | (Brazil) B Sant'Anna | 4 | 3
(Croatia) A Veić | 3 | 7^{7} | 6
Q | (United States) M Krueger | 6 | 6^{5} | 4
Alt | (Italy) G Quinzi | 1 | 5
2 | (Colombia) A González | 6 | 7

Second round
7 | (Brazil) G Clezar | 6 | 5 | 5
(Brazil) T Monteiro | 4 | 7 | 7
Q | (Brazil) T Turini | 3 | 1
3 | (Argentina) G Pella | 6 | 6
5 | (Brazil) R Dutra da Silva | 7^{7} | 6
WC | (Brazil) M Demoliner | 6^{5} | 3
(Croatia) A Veić | 3 | 6 | 4
2 | (Colombia) A González | 6 | 2 | 6

Quarterfinals
(Brazil) T Monteiro | 1 | 3
3 | (Argentina) G Pella | 6 | 6
5 | (Brazil) R Dutra da Silva | 3 | 2
2 | (Colombia) A González | 6 | 6

Semifinals
3 | (Argentina) G Pella | 4 | 5
2 | (Colombia) A González | 6 | 7
