= 2013 Rio Quente Resorts Tennis Classic – Singles =

Singles
- 2013 Rio Quente Resorts Tennis Classic

Final
- Champion: (United States) Rajeev Ram
- Runner-up: (Brazil) André Ghem
- Score: 4–6, 6–4, 6–3

Events
Singles	Doubles
← 2012 ·	Rio Quente Resorts Tennis Classic	· 2014 →

Guilherme Clezar was the defending champion, but lost to James Duckworth in the quarterfinals.
Rajeev Ram won the tournament by defeating André Ghem 4–6, 6–4, 6–3 in the final.

== Seeds ==
1. (United States) Rajeev Ram (champion)
2. (Argentina) Guido Andreozzi (second round)
3. (Brazil) Guilherme Clezar (quarterfinals)
4. (Brazil) Thiago Alves (second round)
5. (Australia) James Duckworth (semifinals)
6. (Brazil) Leonardo Kirche (first round)
7. (Brazil) Marcelo Demoliner (first round)
8. (Brazil) Fabiano de Paula (semifinals)

== Draw ==
=== Key ===
- Q = Qualifier
- WC = Wild card
- LL = Lucky loser
- Alt = Alternate
- SE = Special exempt
- PR = Protected ranking
- ITF = ITF entry
- JE = Junior exempt
- w/o = Walkover
- r = Retired
- d = Defaulted
- SR = Special ranking

=== Finals ===
Semifinals
1	(United States) Rajeev Ram	6	6
5	(Australia) James Duckworth	4	4
(Brazil) André Ghem	6	6
8	(Brazil) Fabiano de Paula	4	3

Final
1	(United States) Rajeev Ram	4	6	6
(Brazil) André Ghem	6	4	3

=== Top half ===
First round
1	(United States) R Ram	7^{7}	6
WC	(Brazil) Wilson Leite	6^{4}	2
Q	(Brazil) Diego Matos	4	7^{7}	4
(Argentina) A Collarini	6	6^{2}	6
(Brazil) R Hocevar	6	6
(Brazil) D Dutra da Silva	4	2
(Brazil) Thiago Monteiro	7^{7}	6
6	(Brazil) L Kirche	6^{1}	3
3	(Brazil) G Clezar	6	6
(Brazil) A Miele	4	1
Q	(Brazil) Marcelo Tebet Filho	6	7^{7}
(Argentina) G Durán	4	6^{4}
WC	(Brazil) T Fernandes	6	6
Q	(Uruguay) A Behar	4	4
(Brazil) J Pereira	3	4
5	(Australia) J Duckworth	6	6

Second round
1	(United States) R Ram	6^{3}	6	6
(Argentina) A Collarini	7^{7}	4	3
(Brazil) R Hocevar	4	6	6
(Brazil) Thiago Monteiro	6	2	3
3	(Brazil) G Clezar	6	6
Q	(Brazil) Marcelo Tebet Filho	3	3
WC	(Brazil) T Fernandes	5	6	3
5	(Australia) J Duckworth	7	4	6

Quarterfinals
1	(United States) R Ram	7^{7}	7
(Brazil) R Hocevar	6^{4}	5
3	(Brazil) G Clezar	4	3
5	(Australia) J Duckworth	6	6

Semifinals
1	(United States) R Ram	6	6
5	(Australia) J Duckworth	4	4

=== Bottom half ===
First round
7	(Brazil) M Demoliner	6^{7}	6	4
(Brazil) F Neis	7^{9}	2	6
(Brazil) A Ghem	6	6
(Chile) G Rivera-Aránguiz	0	2
Q	(Brazil) Carlos Eduardo Severino	5	6^{4}
(Peru) D Beretta	7	7^{7}
(South Africa) F Wolmarans	6	5	4
4	(Brazil) T Alves	2	7	6
8	(Brazil) F de Paula	6	1	6
(Brazil) T Turini	3	6	3
(Brazil) JP Sorgi	4	4
WC	(Brazil) B Sant'anna	6	6
(Brazil) C Zampieri	7^{7}	6
WC	(Brazil) N Santos	6^{4}	1
(Italy) Enrico Becuzzi	1	1
2	(Argentina) G Andreozzi	6	6

Second round
(Brazil) F Neis	2	1
(Brazil) A Ghem	6	6
(Peru) D Beretta	6	6
4	(Brazil) T Alves	3	2
8	(Brazil) F de Paula	7^{9}	2	6
WC	(Brazil) B Sant'anna	6^{7}	6	4
(Brazil) C Zampieri	7^{7}	7^{7}
2	(Argentina) G Andreozzi	6^{5}	6^{4}

Quarterfinals
(Brazil) A Ghem	7^{7}	7
(Peru) D Beretta	6^{4}	5
8	(Brazil) F de Paula	6	6
(Brazil) C Zampieri	2	2

Semifinals
(Brazil) A Ghem	6	6
8	(Brazil) F de Paula	4	3
