= 2013 Aberto Rio Preto – Doubles =

Doubles
- 2013 Aberto Rio Preto

Final
- Champions: (Colombia) Nicolás Barrientos (Colombia) Carlos Salamanca
- Runners-up: (Brazil) Marcelo Demoliner (Brazil) João Souza
- Score: 6–4, 6–4

Events
Singles	Doubles
← 2011 ·	Aberto Rio Preto

Frederico Gil and Jaroslav Pospíšil won the last edition of the event in 2011, but chose not to compete.
Colombians Nicolás Barrientos and Carlos Salamanca defeated Brazilians Marcelo Demoliner and João Souza 6–4, 6–4.

== Seeds ==
1. (Brazil) Marcelo Demoliner / (Brazil) João Souza (final)
2. (Colombia) Nicolás Barrientos / (Colombia) Carlos Salamanca (champions)
3. (Moldova) Roman Borvanov / (New Zealand) Artem Sitak (first round)
4. (Dominican Republic) Víctor Estrella Burgos / (Dominican Republic) José Hernández (first round)

== Draw ==
=== Key ===
- Q = Qualifier
- WC = Wild card
- LL = Lucky loser
- Alt = Alternate
- SE = Special exempt
- PR = Protected ranking
- ITF = ITF entry
- JE = Junior exempt
- w/o = Walkover
- r = Retired
- d = Defaulted
- SR = Special ranking

=== Draw ===
First round
1	(Brazil) M Demoliner (Brazil) J Souza	6	4	[10]
(Peru) S Galdós (Argentina) G Pella	3	6	[3]
(Slovenia) B Kavčič (Croatia) A Veić	6	6
(Canada) S Diez (Venezuela) D Souto	3	3
4	(Dominican Republic) V Estrella Burgos (Dominican Republic) J Hernández	2	1
(Brazil) R Dutra da Silva (Brazil) T Monteiro	6	6
(Brazil) E Dischinger (Brazil) A Ghem	6	6
WC	(Brazil) Guilherme Oliveira (Brazil) B Sant'Anna	2	2
(Colombia) A González (Venezuela) R Maytín	6	6
(Spain) C Gómez-Herrera (Italy) G Quinzi	2	3
(Brazil) R Hocevar (Brazil) L Kirche	7^{7}	6
3	(Moldova) R Borvanov (New Zealand) A Sitak	6^{5}	4
WC	(Brazil) T Alves (Brazil) A Laranja	7	5	[10]
(Portugal) G Elias (Portugal) P Sousa	5	7	[8]
WC	(Brazil) Alexandre Tsuchiya (Brazil) T Turini	3	3
2	(Colombia) N Barrientos (Colombia) C Salamanca	6	6

Quarterfinals
1	(Brazil) M Demoliner (Brazil) J Souza	6	6
(Slovenia) B Kavčič (Croatia) A Veić	2	2
(Brazil) R Dutra da Silva (Brazil) T Monteiro	7^{7}	6
(Brazil) E Dischinger (Brazil) A Ghem	6^{5}	2
(Colombia) A González (Venezuela) R Maytín	4	6	[10]
(Brazil) R Hocevar (Brazil) L Kirche	6	4	[6]
WC	(Brazil) T Alves (Brazil) A Laranja	4	2
2	(Colombia) N Barrientos (Colombia) C Salamanca	6	6

Semifinals
1	(Brazil) M Demoliner (Brazil) J Souza
(Brazil) R Dutra da Silva (Brazil) T Monteiro	w/o
(Colombia) A González (Venezuela) R Maytín	4	2
2	(Colombia) N Barrientos (Colombia) C Salamanca	6	6

Final
1	(Brazil) M Demoliner (Brazil) J Souza	4	4
2	(Colombia) N Barrientos (Colombia) C Salamanca	6	6
