= 2013 Rio Quente Resorts Tennis Classic – Doubles =

Doubles
- 2013 Rio Quente Resorts Tennis Classic

Final
- Champions: (Brazil) Fabiano de Paula (Brazil) Marcelo Demoliner
- Runners-up: (Brazil) Ricardo Hocevar (Brazil) Leonardo Kirche
- Score: 6–3, 6–4

Events
Singles	Doubles
← 2012 ·	Rio Quente Resorts Tennis Classic	· 2014 →

Guido Andreozzi and Marcel Felder were the defending champions, but they chose not to compete.

Fabiano de Paula and Marcelo Demoliner defeated Ricardo Hocevar and Leonardo Kirche 6–3, 6–4 in the final to win the title.

== Seeds ==
1. (Brazil) Fabiano de Paula / (Brazil) Marcelo Demoliner (champions)
2. (Brazil) André Ghem / (Brazil) Fabricio Neis (first round)
3. (Brazil) Guilherme Clezar / (Brazil) Diego Matos (semifinals)
4. (Uruguay) Ariel Behar / (Argentina) Guillermo Durán (first round)

== Draw ==
=== Key ===
- Q = Qualifier
- WC = Wild card
- LL = Lucky loser
- Alt = Alternate
- SE = Special exempt
- PR = Protected ranking
- ITF = ITF entry
- JE = Junior exempt
- w/o = Walkover
- r = Retired
- d = Defaulted
- SR = Special ranking

=== Draw ===
First round
1	(Brazil) F de Paula (Brazil) M Demoliner	4	7^{7}	[10]
(Peru) D Beretta (Argentina) A Collarini	6	6^{2}	[6]
(Brazil) A Miele (Brazil) J Pereira	1	7^{7}	[6]
(Brazil) D Dutra da Silva (Brazil) C Zampieri	6	6^{4}	[10]
4	(Uruguay) A Behar (Argentina) G Durán	1	2
(Brazil) B Sant'anna (Brazil) JP Sorgi	6	6
WC	(Brazil) E Dischinger (Brazil) T Fernandes	6	6
WC	(Brazil) Charles Costa (Brazil) Marcos Vinicius Dias	1	4
(Brazil) T Alves (Brazil) A Laranja	6^{4}	7^{7}	[5]
(Brazil) T Monteiro (Brazil) T Turini	7^{7}	6^{3}	[10]
WC	(Brazil) Rodrigo Perri (South Africa) F Wolmarans	4	4
3	(Brazil) G Clezar (Brazil) Diego Matos	6	6
(Brazil) R Hocevar (Brazil) L Kirche	6	6
(Brazil) N Santos (Brazil) Alexandre Tsuchiya	4	4
(Brazil) Wilson Leite (Brazil) Carlos Eduardo Severino	7	3	[10]
2	(Brazil) A Ghem (Brazil) F Neis	5	6	[7]

Quarterfinals
1	(Brazil) F de Paula (Brazil) M Demoliner	6	6
(Brazil) D Dutra da Silva (Brazil) C Zampieri	3	3
(Brazil) B Sant'anna (Brazil) JP Sorgi	6	6
WC	(Brazil) E Dischinger (Brazil) T Fernandes	1	2
(Brazil) T Monteiro (Brazil) T Turini	3	4
3	(Brazil) G Clezar (Brazil) D Matos	6	6
(Brazil) R Hocevar (Brazil) L Kirche	3	6	[10]
(Brazil) W Leite (Brazil) CE Severino	6	3	[8]

Semifinals
1	(Brazil) F de Paula (Brazil) M Demoliner	6	4	[11]
(Brazil) B Sant'anna (Brazil) JP Sorgi	2	6	[9]
3	(Brazil) G Clezar (Brazil) D Matos	3	3
(Brazil) R Hocevar (Brazil) L Kirche	6	6

Final
1	(Brazil) F de Paula (Brazil) M Demoliner	6	6
(Brazil) R Hocevar (Brazil) L Kirche	3	4
