= 2012 Rio Quente Resorts Tennis Classic – Doubles =

Doubles
- 2012 Rio Quente Resorts Tennis Classic

Final
- Champions: (Argentina) Guido Andreozzi (Uruguay) Marcel Felder
- Runners-up: (Brazil) Thiago Alves (Brazil) Augusto Laranja
- Score: 6–3, 6–3

Events
Singles	Doubles
← 2011 ·	Rio Quente Resorts Tennis Classic	· 2013 →

Guido Andreozzi and Marcel Felder won the title defeating Thiago Alves and Augusto Laranja in the final 6–3, 6–3.

== Seeds ==
1. (Argentina) Guido Andreozzi / (Uruguay) Marcel Felder (champions)
2. (Brazil) Ricardo Mello / (Brazil) Júlio Silva (quarterfinals)
3. (Argentina) Andrés Molteni / (Argentina) Renzo Olivo (quarterfinals)
4. (Brazil) Rodrigo Grilli / (Brazil) André Miele (quarterfinals)

== Draw ==
=== Key ===
- Q = Qualifier
- WC = Wild card
- LL = Lucky loser
- Alt = Alternate
- SE = Special exempt
- PR = Protected ranking
- ITF = ITF entry
- JE = Junior exempt
- w/o = Walkover
- r = Retired
- d = Defaulted
- SR = Special ranking

=== Draw ===
First round
1	(Argentina) G Andreozzi (Uruguay) M Felder	6	6
(Argentina) Guillermo Durán (Argentina) Nicolás Pastor	2	2
(Brazil) L Kirche (Brazil) B Sant'anna	3	6^{7}
(Brazil) G Clezar (United States) A Collarini	6	7^{9}
4	(Brazil) R Grilli (Brazil) A Miele	6^{4}	7	[10]
(Chile) P Capdeville (Brazil) R Hocevar	7^{7}	5	[8]
(Brazil) Eduardo Dischinger (Brazil) Marcelo Tebet Filho	4	4
(Peru) D Beretta (Brazil) Fabiano de Paula	6	6
(Brazil) M Demoliner (Brazil) F Romboli	4	6	[10]
WC	(Brazil) T Fernandes (Brazil) A Ghem	6	3	[12]
WC	(Brazil) Pedro Guimraes (Haiti) O Sajous	1	6^{8}
3	(Argentina) A Molteni (Argentina) R Olivo	6	7^{10}
(Russia) A Kumantsov (Czech Republic) I Minář
(Brazil) T Alves (Brazil) A Laranja	w/o
(Chile) G Rivera-Aránguiz (Chile) C Saavedra-Corvalán	4	6^{4}
2	(Brazil) R Mello (Brazil) J Silva	6	7^{7}

Quarterfinals
1	(Argentina) G Andreozzi (Uruguay) M Felder	6	6
(Brazil) G Clezar (United States) A Collarini	4	1
4	(Brazil) R Grilli (Brazil) A Miele	4	4
(Peru) D Beretta (Brazil) Fabiano de Paula	6	6
WC	(Brazil) T Fernandes (Brazil) A Ghem	7	2	[10]
3	(Argentina) A Molteni (Argentina) R Olivo	5	6	[3]
(Brazil) T Alves (Brazil) A Laranja	6	6
2	(Brazil) R Mello (Brazil) J Silva	3	3

Semifinals
1	(Argentina) G Andreozzi (Uruguay) M Felder	7^{7}	6
(Peru) D Beretta (Brazil) Fabiano de Paula	6^{2}	2
WC	(Brazil) T Fernandes (Brazil) A Ghem	6^{2}	6	[8]
(Brazil) T Alves (Brazil) A Laranja	7^{7}	3	[10]

Final
1	(Argentina) G Andreozzi (Uruguay) M Felder	6	6
(Brazil) T Alves (Brazil) A Laranja	3	3
