= 2011 Pernambuco Brasil Open Series – Doubles =

Doubles
- 2011 Pernambuco Brasil Open Series

Final
- Champions: (Ecuador) Giovanni Lapentti (Brazil) Fernando Romboli
- Runners-up: (Brazil) André Ghem (Brazil) Rodrigo Guidolin
- Score: 6–2, 6–1

Events
| Singles | Doubles |
| ← 2010 · | Pernambuco Brasil Open Series | · 2012 → |

Giovanni Lapentti and Fernando Romboli won the first edition of this tournament, defeating 6–2, 6–1 André Ghem and Rodrigo Guidolin in the final.

== Seeds ==
1. (Brazil) André Ghem / (Brazil) Rodrigo Guidolin (final)
2. (Finland) Timo Nieminen / (Finland) Juho Paukku (second round)
3. (Russia) Ilya Belyaev / (Spain) Adrián Menéndez (second round)
4. (Moldova) Roman Borvanov / (Brazil) Caio Zampieri (first round)

== Draw ==
=== Key ===
- Q = Qualifier
- WC = Wild card
- LL = Lucky loser
- Alt = Alternate
- SE = Special exempt
- PR = Protected ranking
- ITF = ITF entry
- JE = Junior exempt
- w/o = Walkover
- r = Retired
- d = Defaulted
- SR = Special ranking

=== Draw ===
First round
1 | (Brazil) A Ghem (Brazil) R Guidolin | 6 | 6
(Brazil) G Clézar (Brazil) J Pereira | 2 | 2
(Brazil) R Grilli (Brazil) D Dutra da Silva | 6 | 6
WC | (Brazil) Emerson Lima (Brazil) J Silva | 3 | 0
3 | (Russia) I Belyaev (Spain) A Menéndez | 6^{3} | 6 | [10]
(Brazil) Diego Matos (Brazil) A Miele | 7 | 3 | [6]
(Brazil) T Fernandes (Chinese Taipei) T-h Yang | 6 | 7
(Sweden) Christian Lindell (Brazil) Victor Maynard | 1 | 5
WC | (Brazil) A Laranja (Brazil) Bruno Sant'anna
(Switzerland) M Chiudinelli (Switzerland) M Lammer | w/o
(Argentina) F Argüello (Argentina) P Galdón | 4 | 6 | [10]
4 | (Moldova) R Borvanov (Brazil) C Zampieri | 6 | 4 | [5]
(Brazil) R Hocevar (Brazil) Tiago Lopes | 5 | 2
(Ecuador) G Lapentti (Brazil) F Romboli | 7 | 6
WC | (Brazil) Tiago Slonik (Brazil) Thales Turini | 1 | 2
2 | (Finland) T Nieminen (Finland) J Paukku | 6 | 6

Quarterfinals
1 | (Brazil) A Ghem (Brazil) R Guidolin | 6 | 6
(Brazil) R Grilli (Brazil) D Dutra da Silva | 2 | 3
3 | (Russia) I Belyaev (Spain) A Menéndez | w/o
(Brazil) T Fernandes (Chinese Taipei) T-h Yang
WC | (Brazil) A Laranja (Brazil) Bruno Sant'anna | w/o
(Argentina) F Argüello (Argentina) P Galdón
(Ecuador) G Lapentti (Brazil) F Romboli | 4 | 6 | [10]
2 | (Finland) T Nieminen (Finland) J Paukku | 6 | 3 | [7]

Semifinals
1 | (Brazil) A Ghem (Brazil) R Guidolin | 6 | 6
3 | (Russia) I Belyaev (Spain) A Menéndez | 2 | 2
WC | (Brazil) A Laranja (Brazil) Bruno Sant'anna | 4 | 4
(Ecuador) G Lapentti (Brazil) F Romboli | 6 | 6

Final
1 | (Brazil) A Ghem (Brazil) R Guidolin | 2 | 1
(Ecuador) G Lapentti (Brazil) F Romboli | 6 | 6
