= 2011 BVA Open – Doubles =

Doubles
- 2011 BVA Open

Final
- Champions: (Portugal) Frederico Gil (Czech Republic) Jaroslav Pospíšil
- Runners-up: (Brazil) Franco Ferreiro (Spain) Rubén Ramírez Hidalgo
- Score: 6–4, 6–4

Events
Singles	Doubles
← 2010 ·	BVA Open	· 2012 →

Frederico Gil and Jaroslav Pospíšil won the first edition of the tournament, defeating Franco Ferreiro and Rubén Ramírez Hidalgo 6–4, 6–4 in the final.

== Seeds ==
1. (Brazil) Franco Ferreiro / (Spain) Rubén Ramírez Hidalgo (final)
2. (Argentina) Facundo Bagnis / (Argentina) Eduardo Schwank (quarterfinals)
3. (Brazil) Rogério Dutra da Silva / (Brazil) Júlio Silva (semifinals)
4. (Spain) Daniel Muñoz-de la Nava / (Spain) Iván Navarro (first round)

== Draw ==
=== Key ===
- Q = Qualifier
- WC = Wild card
- LL = Lucky loser
- Alt = Alternate
- SE = Special exempt
- PR = Protected ranking
- ITF = ITF entry
- JE = Junior exempt
- w/o = Walkover
- r = Retired
- d = Defaulted
- SR = Special ranking

=== Draw ===
First round
1	(Brazil) F Ferreiro (Spain) R Ramírez Hidalgo	6	3	[10]
(United States) W Odesnik (Brazil) M Torres	4	6	[8]
(Brazil) R Grilli (Brazil) A Miele	7^{9}	4	[10]
WC	(Brazil) T Alves (Brazil) Bruno Semenzato	6^{7}	6	[2]
3	(Brazil) R Dutra da Silva (Brazil) J Silva	6	6
WC	(Brazil) Idio Escobar (Brazil) T Fernandes	1	2
(Uruguay) M Felder (Sweden) C Lindell	6	5	[7]
(Portugal) G Elias (Brazil) C Zampieri	3	7	[10]
(Brazil) M Demoliner (Argentina) A Molteni	4	6^{3}
(Argentina) JP Brzezicki (Brazil) F Romboli	6	7^{7}
(Slovakia) P Červenák (Italy) G Naso	6	6
4	(Spain) D Muñoz-de la Nava (Spain) I Navarro	3	3
(Argentina) M González (Argentina) D Junqueira	6^{4}	3
(Portugal) F Gil (Czech Republic) J Pospíšil	7^{7}	6
WC	(Brazil) A Laranja (Brazil) Carlos Oliveira	3	4
2	(Argentina) F Bagnis (Argentina) E Schwank	6	6

Quarterfinals
1	(Brazil) F Ferreiro (Spain) R Ramírez Hidalgo	6	4	[13]
(Brazil) R Grilli (Brazil) A Miele	2	6	[11]
3	(Brazil) R Dutra da Silva (Brazil) J Silva	7^{7}	6
(Portugal) G Elias (Brazil) C Zampieri	6^{3}	3
(Argentina) JP Brzezicki (Brazil) F Romboli	6	6
(Slovakia) P Červenák (Italy) G Naso	3	3
(Portugal) F Gil (Czech Republic) J Pospíšil	6	6
2	(Argentina) F Bagnis (Argentina) E Schwank	2	3

Semifinals
1	(Brazil) F Ferreiro (Spain) R Ramírez Hidalgo	6	6
3	(Brazil) R Dutra da Silva (Brazil) J Silva	3	1
(Argentina) JP Brzezicki (Brazil) F Romboli	4	4
(Portugal) F Gil (Czech Republic) J Pospíšil	6	6

Final
1	(Brazil) F Ferreiro (Spain) R Ramírez Hidalgo	4	4
(Portugal) F Gil (Czech Republic) J Pospíšil	6	6
