= 2012 Rio Quente Resorts Tennis Classic =

- Date: 7–12 May
- Edition: 1st
- Surface: Hard
- Location: Rio Quente, Brazil

Champions

Singles
- (Brazil) Guilherme Clezar

Doubles
- (Argentina) Guido Andreozzi / (Uruguay) Marcel Felder
Rio Quente Resorts Tennis Classic	· 2013 →

The 2012 Rio Quente Resorts Tennis Classic was a professional tennis tournament played on hard courts. It was the first edition of the tournament which was part of the 2012 ATP Challenger Tour. It took place in Rio Quente, Brazil between 7 and 12 May 2012.

== Singles main-draw entrants ==
=== Seeds ===
Country	Player	Rank^{1}	Seed
CHI	Paul Capdeville	114	1
BRA	Ricardo Mello	141	2
BRA	Júlio Silva	147	3
BRA	Thiago Alves	153	4
CZE	Ivo Minář	181	5
URU	Marcel Felder	247	6
BRA	Ricardo Hocevar	255	7
ARG	Nicolás Pastor	274	8

- ^{1} Rankings are as of April 30, 2012.

=== Other entrants ===
The following players received wildcards into the singles main draw:

- (Brazil) Tiago Fernandes
- (Brazil) Pedro Guimares
- (Brazil) Bruno Sant'anna
- (Brazil) Marcelo Tebet Filho

The following players received entry from the qualifying draw:

- (United States) Andrea Collarini
- (Brazil) Eduardo Dischinger
- (Brazil) Augusto Laranja
- (Czech Republic) Ivo Minář

== Champions ==
=== Singles ===
- (Brazil) Guilherme Clezar def. (Chile) Paul Capdeville, 7–6^{(7–4)}, 6–3

=== Doubles ===
- (Argentina) Guido Andreozzi / (Uruguay) Marcel Felder def. (Brazil) Thiago Alves / (Brazil) Augusto Laranja, 6–3, 6–3
