= 2011 Pernambuco Brasil Open Series – Singles =

Singles
- 2011 Pernambuco Brasil Open Series

Final
- Champion: (Japan) Tatsuma Ito
- Runner-up: (Brazil) Tiago Fernandes
- Score: walkover

Events
Singles	Doubles
← 2010 ·	Pernambuco Brasil Open Series	· 2012 →

Tiago Fernandes announced that fatigue and back pain forced him to give up playing the final match, which was scheduled for 19:30 against the Japanese Tatsuma Ito. Ito won this tournament.

== Seeds ==
1. (Switzerland) Marco Chiudinelli (first round, retired)
2. (Japan) Tatsuma Ito (champion)
3. (Ecuador) Giovanni Lapentti (semifinals)
4. (Brazil) Júlio Silva (semifinals)
5. (Brazil) Ricardo Hocevar (quarterfinals)
6. (Brazil) Fernando Romboli (first round)
7. (Brazil) Caio Zampieri (quarterfinals)
8. (Argentina) Pablo Galdón (first round)

== Draw ==
=== Key ===
- Q = Qualifier
- WC = Wild card
- LL = Lucky loser
- Alt = Alternate
- SE = Special exempt
- PR = Protected ranking
- ITF = ITF entry
- JE = Junior exempt
- w/o = Walkover
- r = Retired
- d = Defaulted
- SR = Special ranking

=== Finals ===
Semifinals
WC	(Brazil) Tiago Fernandes	2	7	7
4	(Brazil) Júlio Silva	6	5	6^{2}
3	(Ecuador) Giovanni Lapentti	6^{7}	3
2	(Japan) Tatsuma Ito	7	6

Final
WC	(Brazil) Tiago Fernandes
2	(Japan) Tatsuma Ito	w/o

=== Top half ===
First round
1	(Switzerland) M Chiudinelli	4	2	r
WC	(Brazil) G Clézar	6	2
Alt	(Russia) I Belyaev	6	6
(Brazil) R Guidolin	4	1
WC	(Brazil) T Fernandes	6	4	6
LL	(Brazil) Tiago Lopes	4	6	2
WC	(Brazil) Bruno Sant'anna	7	6
6	(Brazil) F Romboli	6^{3}	3
4	(Brazil) J Silva	6	6
(Chinese Taipei) T-h Yang	4	2
(Portugal) G Elias	6	6
(Finland) J Paukku	1	2
(Finland) T Nieminen	2	6	6
(Brazil) D Dutra da Silva	6	2	1
Q	(Brazil) Tiago Slonik	6^{4}	2
7	(Brazil) C Zampieri	7	6

Second round
WC	(Brazil) G Clézar	6	6
Alt	(Russia) I Belyaev	1	3
WC	(Brazil) T Fernandes	7	6
WC	(Brazil) Bruno Sant'anna	6^{5}	4
4	(Brazil) J Silva	6	4
(Portugal) G Elias	2	2	r
(Finland) T Nieminen	2	4
7	(Brazil) C Zampieri	6	6

Quarterfinals
WC	(Brazil) G Clézar	4	6	6^{3}
WC	(Brazil) T Fernandes	6	3	7
4	(Brazil) J Silva	3	6	6
7	(Brazil) C Zampieri	6	3	2

Semifinals
WC	(Brazil) T Fernandes	2	7	7
4	(Brazil) J Silva	6	5	6^{2}

=== Bottom half ===
First round
8	(Argentina) P Galdón	2	3
(Brazil) A Ghem	6	6
(Moldova) R Borvanov	2	3
(Switzerland) M Lammer	6	6
WC	(Brazil) A Laranja	1	5
Q	(Brazil) J Pereira	6	7
(Spain) A Menéndez	4	2^{r}
3	(Ecuador) G Lapentti	6	5
5	(Brazil) R Hocevar	6	6
(Argentina) F Argüello	3	3
(Brazil) A Miele	2	7	4
(Sweden) Christian Lindell	6	6^{4}	6
(Austria) N Moser	6	7
Q	(Brazil) Thales Turini	3	5
(Brazil) Eládio Ribeiro Neto	1	2
2	(Japan) T Ito	6	6

Second round
(Brazil) A Ghem	3	3
(Switzerland) M Lammer	6	1^{r}
Q	(Brazil) J Pereira	2	6	4
3	(Ecuador) G Lapentti	6	2	6
5	(Brazil) R Hocevar	6	6
(Sweden) Christian Lindell	1	1
(Austria) N Moser	4	4
2	(Japan) T Ito	6	6

Quarterfinals
(Brazil) A Ghem	4	4
3	(Ecuador) G Lapentti	6	6
5	(Brazil) R Hocevar	6	1	1
2	(Japan) T Ito	4	6	6

Semifinals
3	(Ecuador) G Lapentti	6^{7}	3
2	(Japan) T Ito	7	6
