= 2012 Rio Quente Resorts Tennis Classic – Singles =

Tennis tournament

Singles
- 2012 Rio Quente Resorts Tennis Classic

Final
- Champion: (Brazil) Guilherme Clezar
- Runner-up: (Chile) Paul Capdeville
- Score: 7–6^{(7–4)}, 6–3

Events
Singles	Doubles
- Rio Quente Resorts Tennis Classic

Guilherme Clezar won the title defeating Paul Capdeville in the final 7–6^{(7–4)}, 6–3.

== Seeds ==
1. (Chile) Paul Capdeville (final)
2. (Brazil) Ricardo Mello (second round)
3. (Brazil) Júlio Silva (first round)
4. (Brazil) Thiago Alves (semifinals)
5. (Czech Republic) Ivo Minář (first round)
6. (Uruguay) Marcel Felder (first round)
7. (Brazil) Ricardo Hocevar (first round)
8. (Argentina) Nicolás Pastor (first round)

== Draw ==
Key

- Q = Qualifier
- WC = Wild card
- LL = Lucky loser
- Alt = Alternate
- ITF = ITF entry
- PR = Protected ranking
- SR = Special ranking
- SE = Special exempt
- JE = Junior exempt
- JR = Junior Accelerator Programme entrant
- CO = College Accelerator Programme entrant
- NG = Next Gen Accelerator Program entrant
- w/o = Walkover
- r = Retired
- d = Defaulted

=== Finals ===
Semifinals
1	(Chile) Paul Capdeville	7^{7}	6
Q	(United States) Andrea Collarini	6^{1}	4
4	(Brazil) Thiago Alves	6	3	4
(Brazil) Guilherme Clezar	3	6	6

Final
1	(Chile) Paul Capdeville	6^{4}	3
(Brazil) Guilherme Clezar	7^{7}	6

=== Top half ===
First round
1	(Chile) P Capdeville	3	7^{9}	6
(Brazil) L Kirche	6	6^{7}	3
Q	(Brazil) A Laranja	7^{9}	6
(Brazil) A Miele	6^{7}	4
(Brazil) F Romboli	6	6
(Argentina) Cristhian Benedetti	0	0
(Argentina) R Olivo	6	4	7^{7}
8	(Argentina) Nicolás Pastor	3	6	6^{3}
3	(Brazil) J Silva	4	4
(Argentina) G Andreozzi	6	6
(Argentina) A Molteni	5	3
(Chile) G Rivera-Aránguiz	7	6
(Argentina) Guillermo Durán	4	7	3
WC	(Brazil) Pedro Guimarães	6	5	6
Q	(United States) A Collarini	6	7^{7}
7	(Brazil) R Hocevar	3	6^{7}

Second round
1	(Chile) P Capdeville	6	6
Q	(Brazil) A Laranja	1	2
(Brazil) F Romboli	5	4
(Argentina) R Olivo	7	6
(Argentina) G Andreozzi	6	3	6
(Chile) G Rivera-Aránguiz	4	6	1
WC	(Brazil) Pedro Guimarães	0	3
Q	(United States) A Collarini	6	6

Quarterfinals
1	(Chile) P Capdeville	6	6
(Argentina) R Olivo	2	1
(Argentina) G Andreozzi	6^{4}	0
Q	(United States) A Collarini	7^{7}	6

Semifinals
1	(Chile) P Capdeville	7^{7}	6
Q	(United States) A Collarini	6^{1}	4

=== Bottom half ===
First round
6	(Uruguay) M Felder	5	5
WC	(Brazil) T Fernandes	7	7
(Brazil) A Ghem	6	7^{7}
(Russia) A Kumantsov	3	6^{2}
(Haiti) Olivier Sajous	6	6
Q	(Brazil) Eduardo Dischinger	3	2
(Chile) C Saavedra-Corvalán	6^{3}	5
4	(Brazil) T Alves	7^{7}	7
5/Q	(Czech Republic) I Minář	6^{2}	6	0
WC	(Brazil) Bruno Sant'anna	7^{7}	3	6
(Brazil) M Demoliner	6	6
WC	(Brazil) Marcelo Tebet Filho	1	4
(Brazil) Fabiano de Paula	4	4
(Brazil) G Clezar	6	6
(Peru) D Beretta	4	3
2	(Brazil) R Mello	6	6

Second round
WC	(Brazil) T Fernandes	2	3
(Brazil) A Ghem	6	6
(Haiti) Olivier Sajous	3	2
4	(Brazil) T Alves	6	6
WC	(Brazil) Bruno Sant'anna	7^{7}	5	6
(Brazil) M Demoliner	6^{1}	7	1
(Brazil) G Clezar	6	6
2	(Brazil) R Mello	4	4

Quarterfinals
(Brazil) A Ghem	6	6^{5}	4
4	(Brazil) T Alves	3	7^{7}	6
WC	(Brazil) Bruno Sant'anna	4	3
(Brazil) G Clezar	6	6

Semifinals
4	(Brazil) T Alves	6	3	4
(Brazil) G Clezar	3	6	6
