= 2015 Hong Kong ATP Challenger – Singles =

Singles
- 2015 Hong Kong ATP Challenger

Final
- Champion: (United Kingdom) Kyle Edmund
- Runner-up: (Japan) Tatsuma Ito
- Score: 6–1, 6–2

Events
Singles	Doubles
Hong Kong ATP Challenger	· 2016 →

This was the first edition of the event.

Twenty-year-old British player Kyle Edmund won the tournament, defeating Tatsuma Ito in the final, 6–1, 6–2.

== Seeds ==
1. (Lithuania) Ričardas Berankis (first round)
2. (Japan) Tatsuma Ito (final)
3. (Slovenia) Blaž Kavčič (quarterfinals)
4. (Chinese Taipei) Jimmy Wang (first round)
5. (Australia) James Duckworth (first round)
6. (Japan) Yūichi Sugita (first round)
7. (India) Somdev Devvarman (quarterfinals)
8. (Japan) Hiroki Moriya (first round)

== Draw ==
=== Key ===
- Q = Qualifier
- WC = Wild card
- LL = Lucky loser
- Alt = Alternate
- SE = Special exempt
- PR = Protected ranking
- ITF = ITF entry
- JE = Junior exempt
- w/o = Walkover
- r = Retired
- d = Defaulted
- SR = Special ranking

=== Finals ===
Semifinals
(United Kingdom) Kyle Edmund	7^{7}	6
(Japan) Yoshihito Nishioka	6^{2}	0
(South Korea) Chung Hyeon	4	0
2	(Japan) Tatsuma Ito	6	6

Final
(United Kingdom) Kyle Edmund	6	6
2	(Japan) Tatsuma Ito	1	2

=== Top half ===
First round
1	(Lithuania) R Berankis	6^{1}	6	3
(India) S Myneni	7^{7}	1	6
(India) R Ramanathan	3	6	4
Q	(China) Y Bai	6	4	1^{r}
(United Kingdom) K Edmund	6	7^{7}
(Moldova) R Albot	4	6^{5}
(Australia) M Ebden	7^{7}	7
6	(Japan) Y Sugita	6^{2}	5
4	(Chinese Taipei) J Wang	3	6	4
(China) D Wu	6	2	6
(Chinese Taipei) T Chen	5	6	6^{r}
(Japan) Y Nishioka	7	4	6
(Australia) J Thompson	4	3
Q	(Japan) T Matsui	6	6
(Belgium) N Desein	3	6	7^{7}
8	(Japan) H Moriya	6	2	6^{3}

Second round
(India) S Myneni	7	7
(India) R Ramanathan	5	5
(United Kingdom) K Edmund	7^{7}	6
(Australia) M Ebden	6^{5}	3
(China) D Wu	3	6^{3}
(Japan) Y Nishioka	6	7^{7}
Q	(Japan) T Matsui	6	1	5^{r}
(Belgium) N Desein	1	6	5

Quarterfinals
(India) S Myneni	6^{3}	1
(United Kingdom) K Edmund	7^{7}	6
(Japan) Y Nishioka	6	3	7^{8}
(Belgium) N Desein	4	6	6^{6}

Semifinals
(United Kingdom) K Edmund	7^{7}	6
(Japan) Y Nishioka	6^{2}	0

=== Bottom half ===
First round
5	(Australia) J Duckworth	3	1
(France) J Eysseric	6	6
(South Korea) H Chung	6	6
(France) F Martin	4	4
(Chinese Taipei) L-c Huang	3	6^{5}
Q	(China) M Gong	6	7^{7}
WC	(Chinese Taipei) Ho Chih Jen	2	1
3	(Slovenia) B Kavčič	6	6
7	(India) S Devvarman	2	6	6
(India) Y Bhambri	6	4	3
WC	(Germany) P Petzschner	6	6
(Chinese Taipei) T-H Yang	3	0
Q	(Indonesia) C Rungkat	6	6
WC	(India) S Singh	3	4
WC	(Hong Kong) Li Hei Yin Andrew	4	5
2	(Japan) T Ito	6	7

Second round
(France) J Eysseric	1	1
(South Korea) H Chung	6	6
Q	(China) M Gong	2	4
3	(Slovenia) B Kavčič	6	6
7	(India) S Devvarman	4
WC	(Germany) P Petzschner	1^{r}
Q	(Indonesia) C Rungkat	1	4
2	(Japan) T Ito	6	6

Quarterfinals
(South Korea) H Chung	6	6
3	(Slovenia) B Kavčič	4	1
7	(India) S Devvarman	4	4
2	(Japan) T Ito	6	6

Semifinals
(South Korea) H Chung	4	0
2	(Japan) T Ito	6	6
