= 2011 BVA Open – Singles =

Singles
- 2011 BVA Open

Final
- Champion: (Brazil) Ricardo Mello
- Runner-up: (Argentina) Eduardo Schwank
- Score: 6–4, 6–2

Events
Singles	Doubles
← 2010 ·	BVA Open	· 2012 →

Ricardo Mello won the first edition of the tournament against Eduardo Schwank 6–4, 6–2 in the final.

== Seeds ==
1. (Portugal) Rui Machado (semifinals)
2. (France) Éric Prodon (first round)
3. (Argentina) Diego Junqueira (first round)
4. (Portugal) Frederico Gil (second round)
5. (Brazil) João Souza (second round)
6. (Brazil) Ricardo Mello (champion)
7. (Brazil) Rogério Dutra da Silva (second round)
8. (Argentina) Máximo González (first round)

== Draw ==
=== Key ===
- Q = Qualifier
- WC = Wild card
- LL = Lucky loser
- Alt = Alternate
- SE = Special exempt
- PR = Protected ranking
- ITF = ITF entry
- JE = Junior exempt
- w/o = Walkover
- r = Retired
- d = Defaulted
- SR = Special ranking

=== Finals ===
Semifinals
1	(Portugal) Rui Machado	3	4
(Argentina) Eduardo Schwank	6	6
WC	(Brazil) Thiago Alves	3	2
6	(Brazil) Ricardo Mello	6	6

Final
(Argentina) Eduardo Schwank	4	2
6	(Brazil) Ricardo Mello	6	6

=== Top half ===
First round
1	(Portugal) R Machado	6	6
(Portugal) G Elias	1	3
WC	(Brazil) Carlos Oliveira	0	4
(United States) W Odesnik	6	6
Q	(Argentina) M Alund	7^{7}	6
(Brazil) C Zampieri	6^{2}	4
WC	(Brazil) A Laranja	6	3	0
5	(Brazil) J Souza	4	6	6
4	(Portugal) F Gil	7^{7}	7^{7}
Q	(Brazil) J Pereira	6^{5}	6^{2}
(Argentina) E Schwank	7^{13}	6
(Slovakia) P Červenák	6^{11}	1
SE	(Germany) A Begemann	1	4
Q	(Australia) J Duckworth	6	6
(Italy) G Naso	6	6
8	(Argentina) M González	4	4

Second round
1	(Portugal) R Machado	6	4	6
(United States) W Odesnik	4	6	0
Q	(Argentina) M Alund	7	4	6
5	(Brazil) J Souza	5	6	4
4	(Portugal) F Gil	3	6	4
(Argentina) E Schwank	6	1	6
Q	(Australia) J Duckworth	6^{2}	3
(Italy) G Naso	7^{7}	6

Quarterfinals
1	(Portugal) R Machado	3	7^{7}	6
Q	(Argentina) M Alund	6	6^{5}	2
(Argentina) E Schwank	6	6
(Italy) G Naso	3	4

Semifinals
1	(Portugal) R Machado	3	4
(Argentina) E Schwank	6	6

=== Bottom half ===
First round
7	(Brazil) R Dutra da Silva	6	6
(Argentina) A Molteni	4	4
WC	(Brazil) Bruno Semenzato	3	2
Q	(Argentina) P Galdón	6	6
(Brazil) J Silva	4	6	3
WC	(Brazil) T Alves	6	2	6
(Argentina) JP Brzezicki	6	6
3	(Argentina) D Junqueira	2	1
6	(Brazil) R Mello	6	6
(France) G Rufin	4	4
(Czech Republic) J Pospíšil	2	6	4
(Spain) I Navarro	6	2	6
(Argentina) F Bagnis	6	2	7
(Spain) D Muñoz-de la Nava	2	6	5
(Spain) R Ramírez Hidalgo	6	6
2	(France) É Prodon	3	4

Second round
7	(Brazil) R Dutra da Silva	3	5
Q	(Argentina) P Galdón	6	7
WC	(Brazil) T Alves	7^{7}	6
(Argentina) JP Brzezicki	6^{4}	4
6	(Brazil) R Mello	6	6
(Spain) I Navarro	1	4
(Argentina) F Bagnis	3	0
(Spain) R Ramírez Hidalgo	6	6

Quarterfinals
Q	(Argentina) P Galdón	6	3	4
WC	(Brazil) T Alves	4	6	6
6	(Brazil) R Mello	1	6	6
(Spain) R Ramírez Hidalgo	6	4	3

Semifinals
WC	(Brazil) T Alves	3	2
6	(Brazil) R Mello	6	6
