= 2013 Aberto Rio Preto =

- Date: 7–13 October
- Edition: 2nd
- Surface: Clay
- Location: São José do Rio Preto, Brazil

Champions

Singles
- (Brazil) João Souza

Doubles
- (Colombia) Nicolás Barrientos / (Colombia) Carlos Salamanca
← 2011 ·	Aberto Rio Preto

The 2013 Aberto Rio Preto was a professional tennis tournament played on clay courts. It was the second edition of the tournament which is part of the 2013 ATP Challenger Tour. It took place in São José do Rio Preto, Brazil between 7 and 13 October 2013.

== ATP entrants ==
=== Seeds ===
Country	Player	Rank^{1}	Seed
SLO	Blaž Kavčič	104	1
COL	Alejandro González	106	2
ARG	Guido Pella	116	3
POR	Gastão Elias	129	4
BRA	Rogério Dutra da Silva	132	5
BRA	João Souza	143	6
BRA	Guilherme Clezar	171	7
BRA	André Ghem	198	8

- ^{1} Rankings are as of 30 September 2013.

=== Other entrants ===
The following players received wildcards into the singles main draw:

- (Brazil) Marcelo Demoliner
- (Brazil) Augusto Laranja
- (Brazil) Marcelo Zormann
- (Brazil) Bruno Sant'Anna

The following players got into the singles main draw as an alternate:

- (Italy) Gianluigi Quinzi

The following players received entry from the qualifying draw:

- (United States) Mitchell Krueger
- (Brazil) Wilson Leite
- (Brazil) Fernando Romboli
- (Brazil) Thales Turini

== Champions ==
=== Singles ===
- (Brazil) João Souza def. (Colombia) Alejandro González 7–6^{(7–0)}, 6–3

=== Doubles ===
- (Colombia) Nicolás Barrientos / (Colombia) Carlos Salamanca def. (Brazil) Marcelo Demoliner / (Brazil) João Souza 6–4, 6–4
