= 2015 Hong Kong ATP Challenger – Doubles =

Doubles
- 2015 Hong Kong ATP Challenger

Final
- Champion: (Chinese Taipei) Hsieh Cheng-peng (Chinese Taipei) Yi Chu-huan
- Runner-up: (India) Saketh Myneni (India) Sanam Singh
- Score: 6–4, 6–2

Events
Singles	Doubles
Hong Kong ATP Challenger	· 2016 →

This was the first edition of the event.

Hsieh Cheng-peng and Yi Chu-huan won the title, defeating Saketh Myneni and Sanam Singh in the final, 6–4, 6–2.

== Seeds ==
1. (New Zealand) Marcus Daniell / (New Zealand) Artem Sitak (first round)
2. (Germany) Frank Moser / (India) Divij Sharan (quarterfinals)
3. (Thailand) Sanchai Ratiwatana / (Thailand) Sonchat Ratiwatana (semifinals, withdrew)
4. (China) Gong Maoxin / (Chinese Taipei) Peng Hsien-yin (first round)

== Draw ==
=== Key ===
- Q = Qualifier
- WC = Wild card
- LL = Lucky loser
- Alt = Alternate
- SE = Special exempt
- PR = Protected ranking
- ITF = ITF entry
- JE = Junior exempt
- w/o = Walkover
- r = Retired
- d = Defaulted
- SR = Special ranking

First round
1	(New Zealand) M Daniell (New Zealand) A Sitak	4	5
(France) J Eysseric (United States) T Sandgren	6	7
(India) S Myneni (India) S Singh	4	6	[10]
(France) F Martin (India) P Raja	6	3	[4]
4	(China) M Gong (Chinese Taipei) H-y Peng	1	4
(Belgium) N Desein (Australia) M Ebden	6	6
(Chinese Taipei) H-h Lee (Chinese Taipei) T-h Yang	6	7^{7}
(Chinese Taipei) T Chen (Japan) T Matsui	3	6^{5}
(Moldova) R Albot (Australia) J Thompson	6	3	[10]
(India) S Devvarman (Chile) D Wu	3	6	[5]
WC	(Germany) P Petzschner (Hong Kong) HK Wong	1	6^{1}
3	(Thailand) Sa Ratiwatana (Thailand) So Ratiwatana	6	7^{7}
WC	(Chinese Taipei) C-p Hsieh (Chinese Taipei) C-h Yi	6	6
WC	(Hong Kong) Hei Yin Andrew Li (Chinese Taipei) J Wang	4	3
(Chinese Taipei) L-c Huang (Japan) Y Sugita	5	1
2	(Germany) F Moser (India) D Sharan	7	6

Quarterfinals
(France) J Eysseric (United States) T Sandgren	1	6	[9]
(India) S Myneni (India) S Singh	6	1	[11]
(Belgium) N Desein (Australia) M Ebden	6	6
(Chinese Taipei) H-h Lee (Chinese Taipei) T-h Yang	3	4
(Moldova) R Albot (Australia) J Thompson	0	4
3	(Thailand) Sa Ratiwatana (Thailand) So Ratiwatana	6	6
WC	(Chinese Taipei) C-p Hsieh (Chinese Taipei) C-h Yi	6	6
2	(Germany) F Moser (India) D Sharan	1	1

Semifinals
(India) S Myneni (India) S Singh	6	6
(Belgium) N Desein (Australia) M Ebden	1	2
3	(Thailand) Sa Ratiwatana (Thailand) So Ratiwatana
WC	(Chinese Taipei) C-p Hsieh (Chinese Taipei) C-h Yi	w/o

Final
(India) S Myneni (India) S Singh	4	2
WC	(Chinese Taipei) C-p Hsieh (Chinese Taipei) C-h Yi	6	6
