= 2011 BVA Open =

- Date: 24–30 October
- Edition: 1st
- Location: São José do Rio Preto, Brazil

Champions

Singles
- (Brazil) Ricardo Mello

Doubles
- (Portugal) Frederico Gil / (Czech Republic) Jaroslav Pospíšil
BVA Open	· 2013 →

The 2011 BVA Open was a professional tennis tournament played on clay courts. It was the first edition of the tournament which is part of the 2011 ATP Challenger Tour. It took place in São José do Rio Preto, Brazil between 24 and 30 October 2011.

== ATP entrants ==
=== Seeds ===
Country	Player	Rank^{1}	Seed
POR	Rui Machado	75	1
FRA	Éric Prodon	88	2
ARG	Diego Junqueira	91	3
POR	Frederico Gil	99	4
BRA	João Souza	107	5
BRA	Ricardo Mello	112	6
BRA	Rogério Dutra da Silva	116	7
ARG	Máximo González	129	8

- ^{1} Rankings are as of October 17, 2011.

=== Other entrants ===
The following players received wildcards into the singles main draw:

- (Brazil) Thiago Alves
- (Brazil) Augusto Laranja
- (Brazil) Carlos Oliveira
- (Brazil) Bruno Semenzato

The following players received entry as a special exempt into the singles main draw:

- (Germany) Andre Begemann

The following players received entry from the qualifying draw:

- (Argentina) Martín Alund
- (Australia) James Duckworth
- (Argentina) Pablo Galdón
- (Brazil) José Pereira

== Champions ==
=== Singles ===
(Brazil) Ricardo Mello def. (Argentina) Eduardo Schwank, 6–4, 6–2

=== Doubles ===
(Portugal) Frederico Gil / (Czech Republic) Jaroslav Pospíšil def. (Brazil) Franco Ferreiro / (Spain) Rubén Ramírez Hidalgo, 6–4, 6–4
