= 2011 Pernambuco Brasil Open Series =

- Date: 4–10 April
- Edition: 1st
- Location: Recife, Brazil

Champions

Singles
- (Japan) Tatsuma Ito

Doubles
- (Ecuador) Giovanni Lapentti / (Brazil) Fernando Romboli
Pernambuco Brasil Open Series	· 2012 →

The 2011 Pernambuco Brasil Open Series was a professional tennis tournament played on hard courts. It was the first edition of the tournament which was part of the 2011 ATP Challenger Tour. It took place in Recife, Brazil between 4 and 10 April 2011.

== Singles main-draw entrants ==
=== Seeds ===
Country	Player	Rank^{1}	Seed
SUI	Marco Chiudinelli	144	1
JPN	Tatsuma Ito	169	2
ECU	Giovanni Lapentti	175	3
BRA	Júlio Silva	212	4
BRA	Ricardo Hocevar	238	5
BRA	Fernando Romboli	246	6
BRA	Caio Zampieri	260	7
ARG	Pablo Galdón	270	8

- Rankings are as of March 21, 2011.

=== Other entrants ===
The following players received wildcards into the singles main draw:

- (Brazil) Guilherme Clézar
- (Brazil) Tiago Fernandes
- (Brazil) Augusto Laranja
- (Brazil) Bruno Sant'Anna

The following players received entry from the qualifying draw:

- (Brazil) José Pereira
- (Brazil) Tiago Slonik
- (Brazil) Thales Turini
- (Germany) Lars Uebel (withdrew)
- (Brazil) Tiago Lopes (as lucky loser)

== Champions ==
=== Singles ===
(Japan) Tatsuma Ito def. (Brazil) Tiago Fernandes, walkover

=== Doubles ===
(Ecuador) Giovanni Lapentti / (Brazil) Fernando Romboli def. (Brazil) André Ghem / (Brazil) Rodrigo Guidolin, 6–2, 6–1
