= 2013 Rio Quente Resorts Tennis Classic =

- Date: 6–12 May
- Edition: 2nd
- Draw: 32S / 16D
- Prize money: $35,000+H
- Surface: Hard
- Location: Rio Quente, Brazil

Champions

Singles
- (United States) Rajeev Ram

Doubles
- (Brazil) Fabiano de Paula / (Brazil) Marcelo Demoliner
← 2012 ·	Rio Quente Resorts Tennis Classic	· 2014 →

The 2013 Rio Quente Resorts Tennis Classic was a professional tennis tournament played on hard courts. It was the second edition of the tournament which was part of the 2013 ATP Challenger Tour. It took place in Rio Quente, Brazil between 6 and 12 May 2013.

== Singles main-draw entrants ==
=== Seeds ===
Country	Player	Rank^{1}	Seed
USA	Rajeev Ram	111	1
ARG	Guido Andreozzi	161	2
BRA	Guilherme Clezar	179	3
BRA	Thiago Alves	189	4
AUS	James Duckworth	213	5
BRA	Leonardo Kirche	239	6
BRA	Marcelo Demoliner	252	7
BRA	Fabiano de Paula	255	8

- ^{1} Rankings are as of April 29, 2013.

=== Other entrants ===
The following players received wildcards into the singles main draw:

- (Brazil) Tiago Fernandes
- (Brazil) Wilson Leite
- (Brazil) Bruno Sant'anna
- (Brazil) Nicolas Santos

The following players received entry from the qualifying draw:

- (Uruguay) Ariel Behar
- (Brazil) Diego Matos
- (Brazil) Carlos Eduardo Severino
- (Brazil) Marcelo Tebet Filho

== Doubles main-draw entrants ==
=== Seeds ===
Country	Player	Country	Player	Rank^{1}	Seed
BRA	Fabiano de Paula	BRA	Marcelo Demoliner	252	1
BRA	André Ghem	BRA	Fabrício Neis	416	2
BRA	Guilherme Clezar	BRA	Diego Matos	521	3
URU	Ariel Behar	ARG	Guillermo Durán	589	4

- ^{1} Rankings as of April 29, 2013.

=== Other entrants ===
The following pairs received wildcards into the doubles main draw:

- (Brazil) Charles Costa / (Brazil) Marcos Vinicius Dias
- (Brazil) Eduardo Dischinger / (Brazil) Tiago Fernandes
- (Brazil) Rodrigo Perri / (South Africa) Fritz Wolmarans

== Champions ==
=== Singles ===
- (United States) Rajeev Ram def. (Brazil) André Ghem, 4–6, 6–4, 6–3

=== Doubles ===
- (Brazil) Fabiano de Paula / (Brazil) Marcelo Demoliner def. (Brazil) Ricardo Hocevar / (Brazil) Leonardo Kirche, 6–3, 6–4
