= 2015 Hong Kong ATP Challenger =

- Date: 27 January – 1 February 2015
- Edition: 1st
- Draw: 32S / 16D
- Prize money: $50,000
- Surface: Hard
- Location: Hong Kong, China

Champions

Singles
- (United Kingdom) Kyle Edmund

Doubles
- (Chinese Taipei) Hsieh Cheng-peng / (Chinese Taipei) Yi Chu-huan
Hong Kong ATP Challenger	· 2016 →

The 2015 Hong Kong ATP Challenger was a professional tennis tournament played on hard courts. It was the first edition of the tournament which was part of the 2015 ATP Challenger Tour. It took place in Hong Kong, between 27 January and 1 February 2015.

== Singles main draw entrants ==
=== Seeds ===
Country	Player	Rank^{1}	Seed
LTU	Ričardas Berankis	85	1
JPN	Tatsuma Ito	89	2
SLO	Blaž Kavčič	102	3
TPE	Jimmy Wang	118	4
AUS	James Duckworth	120	5
JPN	Yūichi Sugita	136	6
IND	Somdev Devvarman	139	7
JPN	Hiroki Moriya	146	8

- ^{1} Rankings are as of January 19, 2015.

=== Other entrants ===
The following players received wildcards into the singles main draw:

- (Chinese Taipei) Ho Chih Jen
- (Hong Kong) Hei Yin Andrew Li
- (Germany) Philipp Petzschner
- (India) Sanam Singh

The following players received entry from the qualifying draw:

- (China) Bai Yan
- (China) Gong Maoxin
- (Japan) Toshihide Matsui
- (Indonesia) Christopher Rungkat

== Champions ==
=== Singles ===
- (United Kingdom) Kyle Edmund def. (Japan) Tatsuma Ito 6–1, 6–2

=== Doubles ===
- (Chinese Taipei) Hsieh Cheng-peng / (Chinese Taipei) Yi Chu-huan def. (India) Saketh Myneni / (India) Sanam Singh 6–4, 6–2
