= Kyle Edmund =

British tennis player

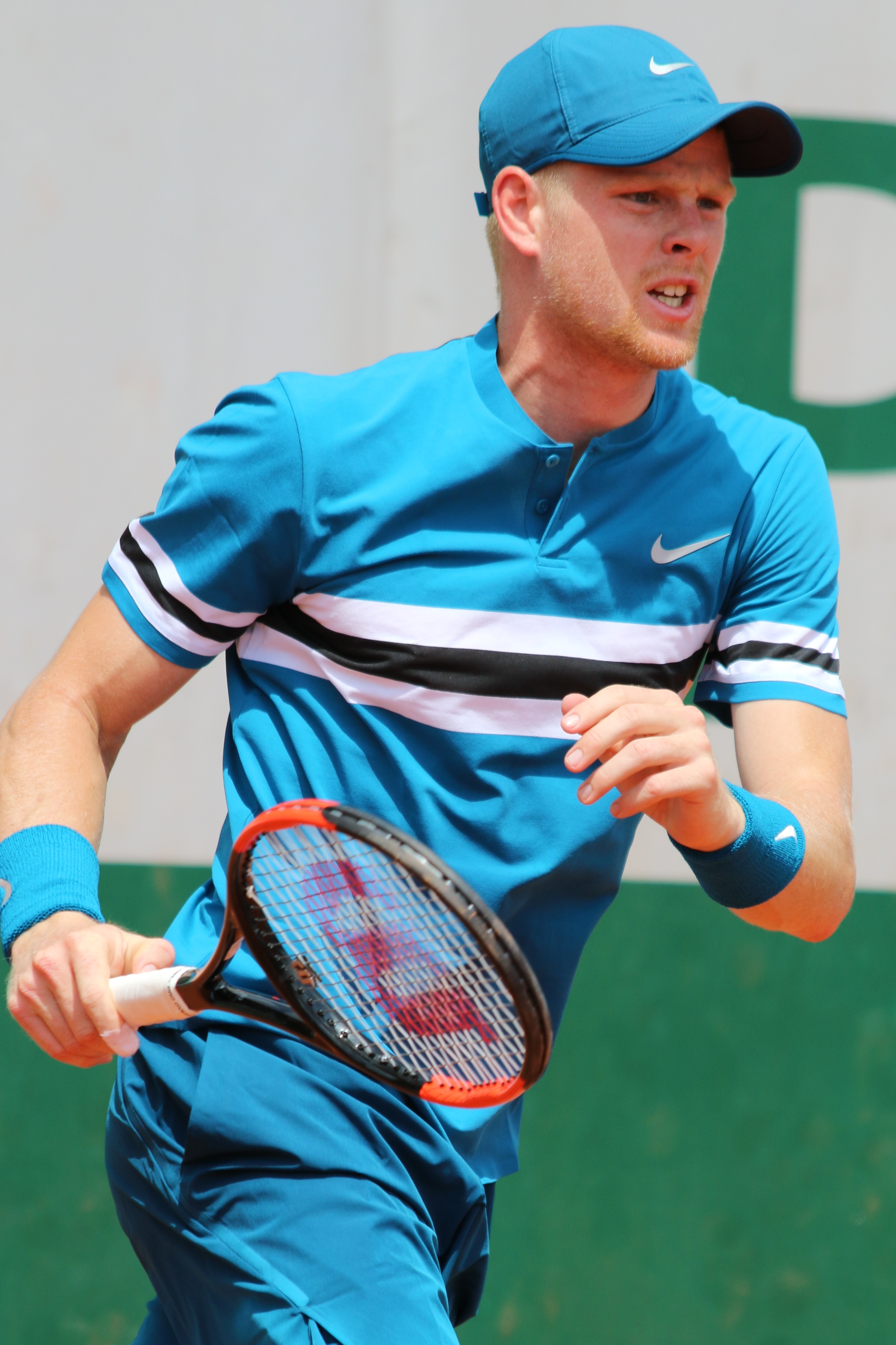
- Edmund in 2018
- Full name: Kyle Steven Edmund
- Country (sports): (United Kingdom) Great Britain
- Residence: London, England, UK
- Born: 8 January 1995 (age 31) Johannesburg, South Africa
- Height: 6 ft 2 in (1.88 m)
- Turned pro: 2011
- Retired: 18 August 2025
- Plays: Right-handed (two-handed backhand)
- Coach: Richard Plews (2005–2008); John Black (2009–2011); Greg Rusedski (2013, 2014); James Trotman (2014–2015); Ryan Jones (2016–2017); Mark Hilton (2017–2019); Fredrik Rosengren (2017–2019); Franco Davín (2020); Colin Beecher (2011–2014, 2019, 2021–2025)
- Prize money: US $6,073,157

Singles
- Career record: 119–125
- Career titles: 2
- Highest ranking: No. 14 (8 October 2018)

Grand Slam singles results
- Australian Open: SF (2018)
- French Open: 3R (2017, 2018)
- Wimbledon: 3R (2018)
- US Open: 4R (2016)

Other tournaments
- Olympic Games: 2R (2016)

Doubles
- Career record: 12–23
- Career titles: 1
- Highest ranking: No. 143 (7 October 2019)

Grand Slam doubles results
- Wimbledon: 1R (2013, 2014, 2015, 2016, 2017, 2024)

Grand Slam mixed doubles results
- Wimbledon: 1R (2013, 2022)

Team competitions
- Davis Cup: W (2015)

Kyle Steven Edmund (born 8 January 1995) is a British former professional tennis player. He has a career-high singles ranking of world No. 14 and was the top-ranked male British tennis player from March 2018 to October 2019.

Edmund is an Australian Open semifinalist, and only the sixth British man to play in a major singles semifinal in the Open Era. He won his maiden ATP Tour title at Antwerp in October 2018. Edmund made his Davis Cup debut in the 2015 final, against Belgium, with Great Britain winning the tournament for the first time in 79 years. The Davis Cup team won the 2015 BBC Sports Personality Team of the Year Award.

He has won two junior Grand Slam doubles titles, at the 2012 US Open and the 2013 French Open, both with partner Frederico Ferreira Silva. Edmund was part of the Great Britain team that won the Junior Davis Cup for the first time in 2011.

== Early and personal life ==
Edmund was born in Johannesburg, South Africa. His father, Steven, was born in Wales but was raised in Zimbabwe and lived in South Africa. His mother, Denise (née Vosloo) was from South Africa. He moved to Britain when he was three and grew up in the village of Tickton near Beverley, East Riding of Yorkshire. Steven is a director of a renewable energy company. His parents invested tens of thousands into their son's tennis until the LTA provided funding through Aegon that took care of travel and coaching.

Initially cricket and swimming were his main childhood pursuits, but he switched to tennis at 10 after lessons at the David Lloyd Racquet and Fitness Club in Hull with coach Richard Plews. He was educated at Pocklington School and Beverley Grammar School and by the age of 13 moved to Cannons in Hull to train with John Black. At 14, he moved with John Black to train at Win Tennis, based at the National Sports Centre at Bisham Abbey, Berkshire. When he was nearly 17, he based himself at the Lawn Tennis Association's National Training Centre in Roehampton to be coached by Colin Beecher, returning to see his family at weekends.

In December 2017, Edmund moved his official residence from the UK to Nassau, Bahamas to maximise his off-season preparation in a warmer climate, and to have a closer base to the US, though his move has been criticised as being financially opportunistic and motivated by tax.

Edmund is also a football fan and supports Liverpool F.C.

== Junior career ==
=== 2011–2013: Two junior Grand Slam doubles titles ===
Edmund made his first breakthrough on the Junior circuit in 2011, when he reached the semifinals of the US Open boys' singles event, where he was defeated by top seed and eventual runner-up Jiří Veselý of the Czech Republic.

Playing in the Great Britain Under 16 boys team, with Evan Hoyt and Luke Bambridge, they won the European Summer Cup defeating Italy in the final.

Great Britain won the Junior Davis Cup tournament for the first time after beating Italy in the final in San Luis Potosí, Mexico. Coached by Greg Rusedski, the team of Edmund, Evan Hoyt and Luke Bambridge justified their top seeding in the event.

The following year he won his first junior Grand Slam title, at the boys' doubles event of the US Open, partnered by Portuguese player Frederico Ferreira Silva. The two defeated Australian duo Nick Kyrgios and Jordan Thompson in the final, after losing the first set. Edmund reached a career high of No. 8 in the combined ITF junior rankings in January 2012, reaching at least the quarterfinals of all four junior slams in singles.

At the French Open, Edmund and Silva won their second Grand Slam title, defeating Chilean pair Cristian Garín and Nicolás Jarry in the final.

== Senior career ==
=== 2010–2014: Joining the tour, turning pro, first steps ===
Edmund began on the ITF Futures circuit in April 2010 at the Great Britain F5 in Bournemouth, losing the first qualifier match. It was a full year before Edmund played another Futures, again at the Great Britain F5 in Bournemouth, this time as a wild card in the main draw, but was beaten in the first round by Nicolas Rosenzweig.

After playing 18 Futures events, in October Edmund won his first tournament in Birmingham, Alabama, US.

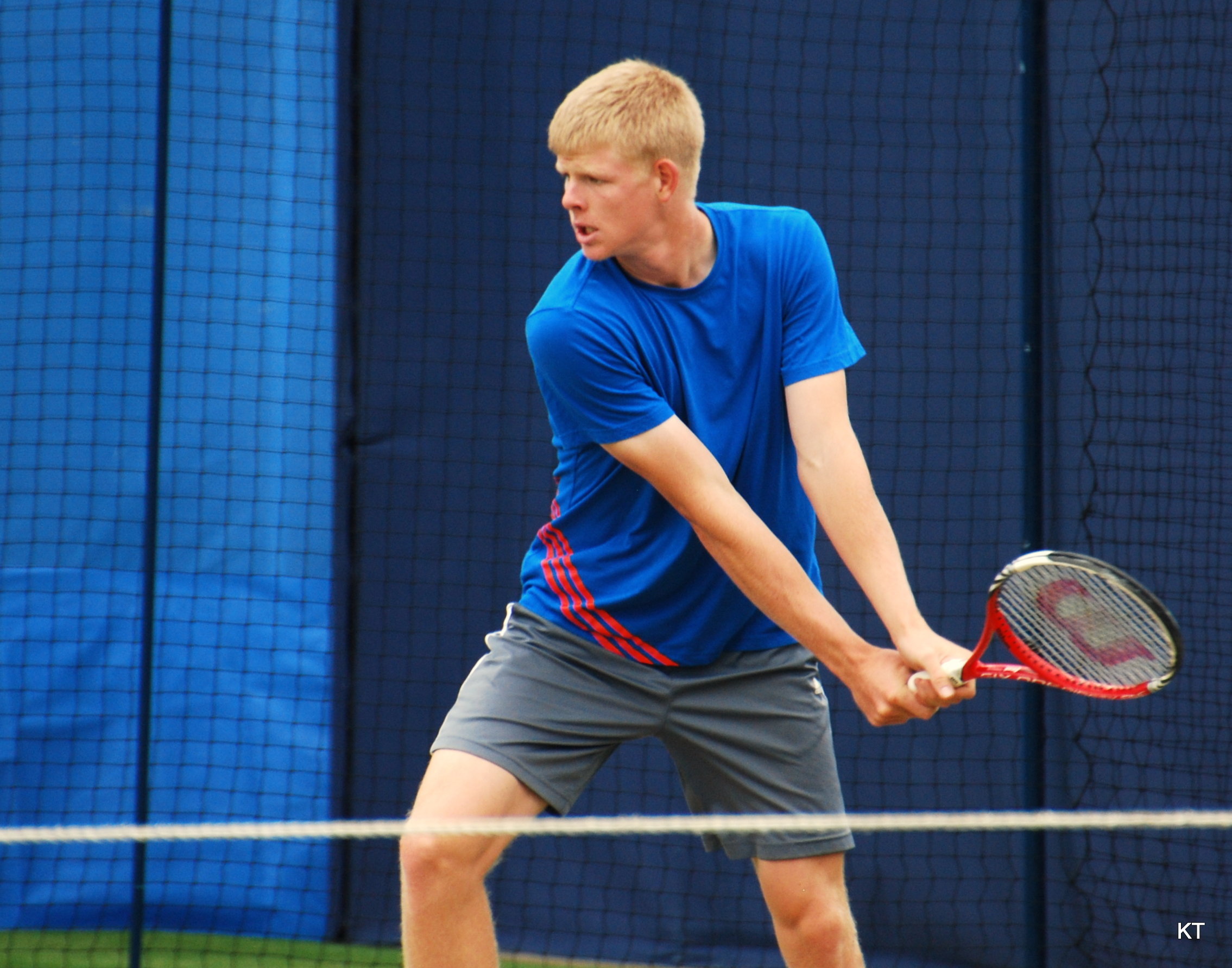
Edmund practising at the 2013 Aegon Championships

Edmund played in his first ATP tour match in June when he was awarded a Wildcard for the annual Queen's Club tournament in London, losing to Slovenian Grega Žemlja, but that didn't dent his confidence as he then won his first senior match at the Aegon International in Eastbourne. Following a wildcard entrance into the tournament, he defeated the world No. 82 Kenny de Schepper, ranked 360 places above him, in straight sets. In June 2013, Edmund defeated world No. 17 Gilles Simon in tie-breaks.

At Wimbledon, his first senior appearance at a Grand Slam tournament, he entered five separate tournaments, receiving wildcards into the men's singles and doubles due to his junior success. In the men's singles, he lost in the first round to 24th seed Jerzy Janowicz in straight sets. In the men's doubles, he partnered Jamie Baker, losing in the first round to David Marrero and Andreas Seppi in straight sets. In the mixed doubles, he partnered fellow teenager Eugenie Bouchard, losing again in the first round to Frederik Nielsen and Sofia Arvidsson, again in straight sets.

In December, Andy Murray invited Edmund, James Ward and Ross Hutchins to his training camp in Miami.

In January, Edmund received his first call-up to the Great Britain Davis Cup team for their World Group tie against the US, and was part of the initial nominations before being replaced by doubles specialist Dominic Inglot, meaning he was the first reserve singles player.

In April it was announced that former British player, Greg Rusedski, had assumed the role of Edmund's full-time coach.

After less than six months, Edmund dispensed with Greg Rusedski following a recent slump in form. Edmund lost five consecutive first rounds and is believed to have concluded that Rusedski's other commitments would prevent him from putting in the necessary time at this key stage of his development. Edmund opted to concentrate on working with his other coach, James Trotman.

In November, Edmund reached his first final at the Yokohama Challenger, thanks to back-to-back victories over higher-ranked players. However, Australian John Millman proved too strong in the final, winning in straight sets. Consequently, Edmund broke into the top 200.

In December, Edmund and James Ward again stayed with Andy Murray at his training camp in Miami for two and a half weeks.

=== 2015–2017: Davis Cup Champion, top 50 ===
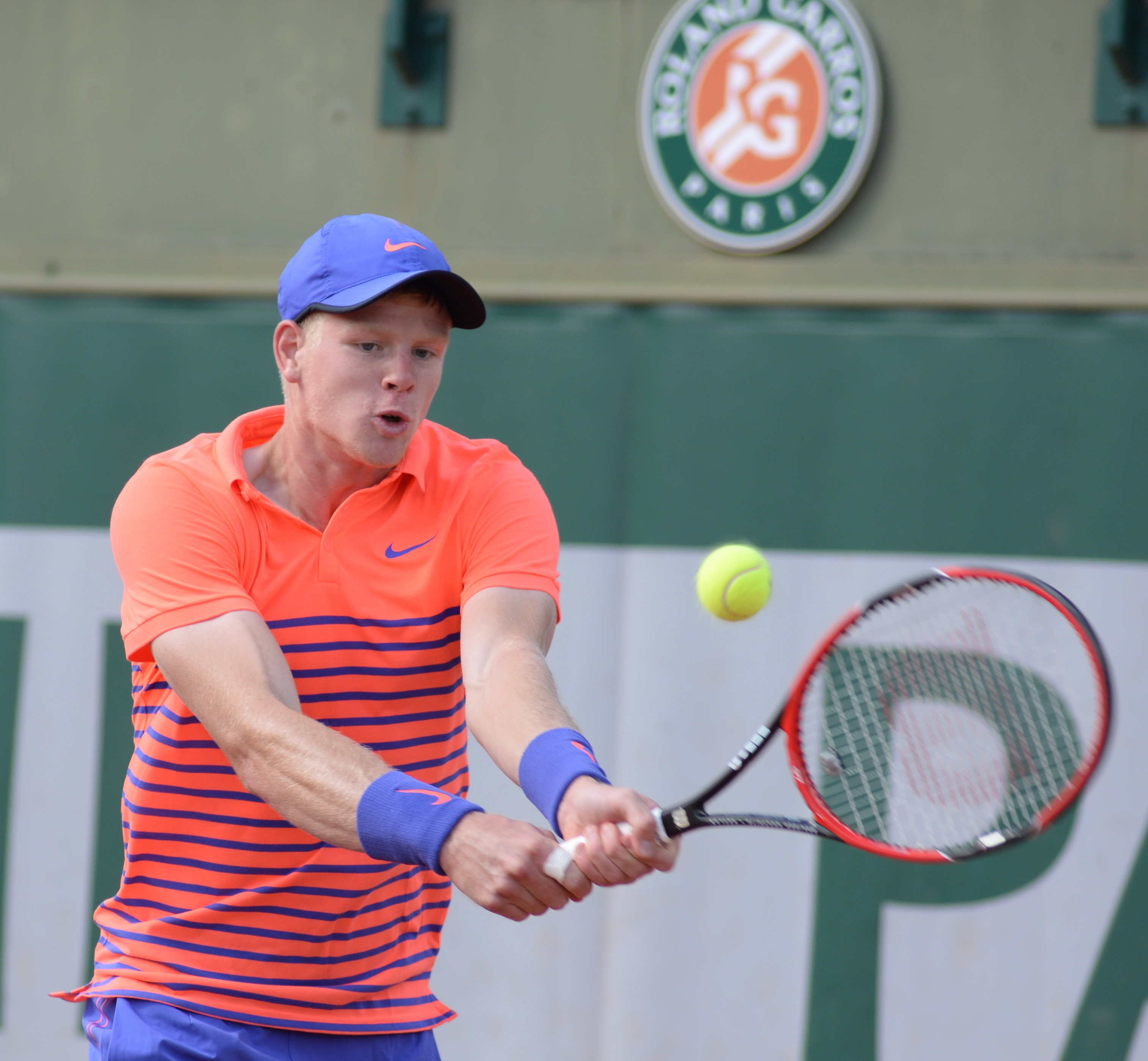
Edmund at the 2015 French Open

Edmund began the 2015 season at the qualifying tournament of the Australian Open. He defeated Tristan Lamasine from France and Austin Krajicek of the US to reach the final round of qualifying, where he faced Australian wildcard Dane Propoggia. He defeated Propoggia in three close sets to qualify for the main draw of a Grand Slam tournament for the first time, and make his first appearance at a major tournament besides Wimbledon. In the first round of the main competition Edmund faced Steve Johnson, but lost to the American in straight sets.

He came back from the defeat well the following week, making it to the final of the Hong Kong Challenger, and defeating world No. 94 Tatsuma Ito of Japan in a dominant display to claim his first ever Challenger Tour title without dropping a set. As a result of both his Australian Open qualifying campaign and his title in Hong Kong, Edmund broke into the world's top 150 for the first time, reaching 148th in the world. The following week, Edmund reached the quarterfinals of the Burnie International, after defeating Chung Hyeon. Throughout the spring Edmund continued to rise up the rankings, achieving a career high of world No. 121 in the world on 18 May due to his success in Challenger level events.

Following three rounds of qualifying, Edmund made it to the main draw of the French Open for the first time in his career. In the first round he faced Frenchman Stéphane Robert, and recorded his first ever Grand Slam level victory, as well as his first ever five-set match win. He was due to face Nick Kyrgios in the second round, but was forced to withdraw with a stomach injury, which it was feared could make him miss the entire grass court season if exacerbated. Following his first round win, Edmund reached a career high ranking of 101. After receiving a wildcard for Wimbledon, Edmund was beaten in the first round in straight sets by Alexandr Dolgopolov.

In July, Edmund won the Binghamton Challenger, completing the final in 66 minutes, ten years after Andy Murray won the same title.

Edmund was announced for the Great Britain squad for the Davis Cup Semi-final against Australia. However, he picked up an ankle injury on the Tuesday before the tie and was dropped.

Edmund reacted to a disappointing autumn by parting company with his coach James Trotman, just five weeks ahead of the Davis Cup final.

Davis Cup Captain Leon Smith supervised Edmund and James Ward, accompanying them to South America to help him decide on his second singles player for the Davis Cup Final. In November, the 20 year old Edmund won the Copa Fila Challenge title in Argentina on clay beating Brazil's Carlos Berlocq, ranked No 112 in the world and an expert on the surface. Ward lost in the second round of the same event, though Ward, ranked 156, had also recently won a hard court challenger tournament. On the same day as Edmund's victory, Dan Evans, ranked 271, won the Knoxville Challenger on a hard court, but with Belgium opting to stage the tie on an indoor clay court, Smith chose to go with the British number two Edmund, now ranked 100.

Edmund made his Davis Cup debut in the 2015 final versus Belgium in Ghent, playing the first singles match against Belgian Number 1 David Goffin, ranked No 16. Edmund cruised through the opening two sets, but was unable to close the match out as he ultimately went on to lose in five. Edmund said ""My legs just started to get tired. I could feel them straining a bit, cramping a bit." Edmund became only the sixth man in the 115-year history of the Davis Cup to make his debut in the final. Great Britain went on to lead 3–1, and win the Davis Cup for the first time since 1936.

In December, Edmund was invited to participate in the inaugural Tie Break Tens tournament at the Royal Albert Hall, with Andy Murray, Tim Henman, David Ferrer, John McEnroe and Xavier Malisse. Edmund lost to Andy Murray in the group stage, but went on to beat him 10–7 in the final.

Edmund joined the rest of the Davis Cup team at the BBC Sports Personality of the Year Show, where they won the 2015 Team of the Year Award.

Edmund accompanied Andy Murray at his training camp in Dubai, which included a trial period with British coach Ryan Jones.

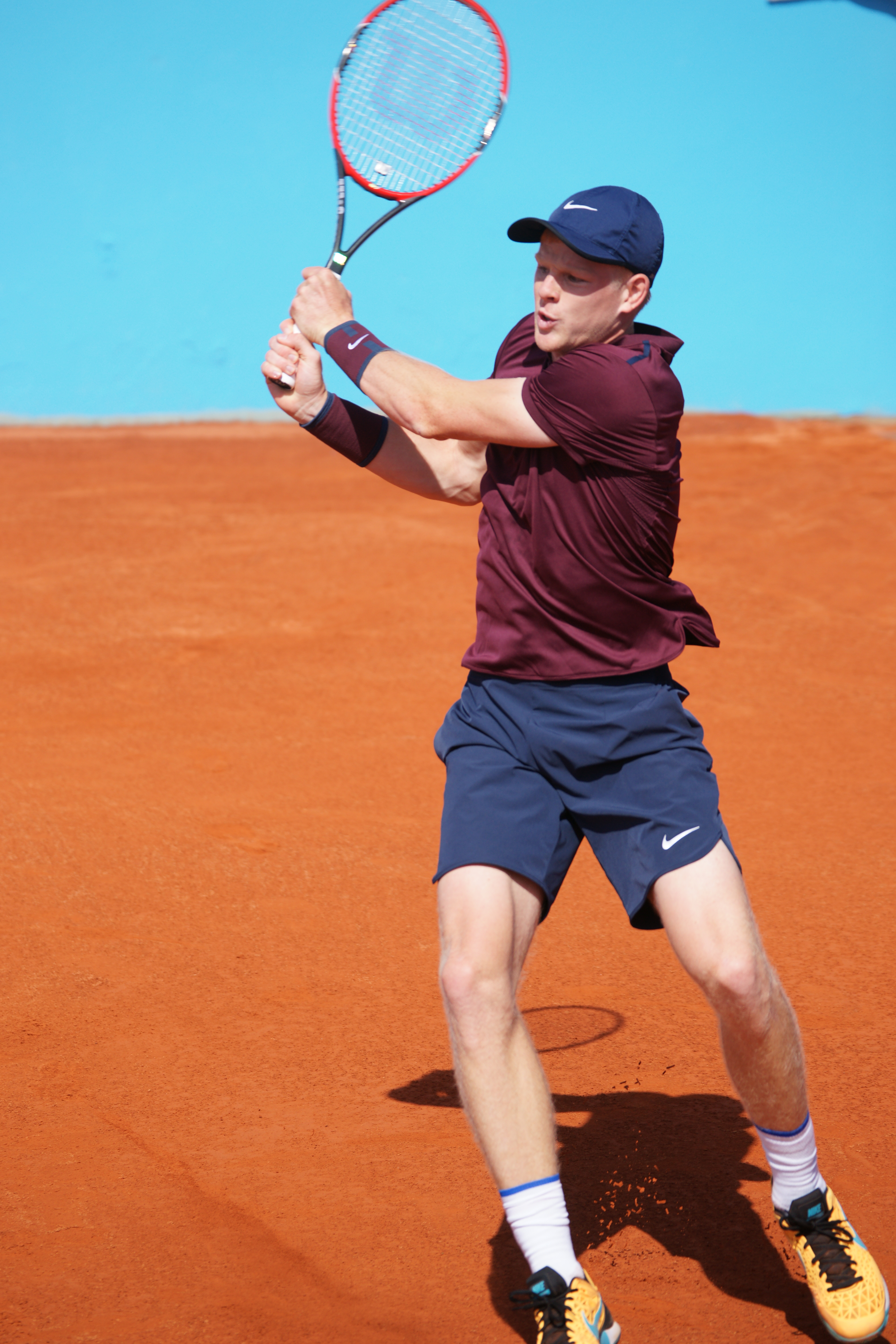
Kyle Edmund at the 2016 Open de Nice Côte d'Azur

In his first tournament of 2016, Edmund succeeded in qualifying for the Qatar Open. In the first round of the main draw Edmund achieved his first ever top-50 win over 43-ranked Martin Kližan in straight sets, before defeating Daniel Muñoz de la Nava to reach his first ATP quarterfinal, where he lost in straight sets to world number 7 Tomáš Berdych.

Edmund ranked 102, secured a place in the main draw of the Australian Open following the withdrawal of three players. Edmund was confident enough of automatic qualification to have already signed up for the Kooyong Classic, which is played at the same time as qualifying. At the Kooyong Classic exhibition match, Edmund posted a straight sets win over Australian Omar Jasika.

In the first round of the Australian Open, Edmund suffered a prolonged attack of cramping, as he went down in five sets to Bosnian Damir Dzumhur, despite having been two sets to one up, in a match lasting three hours and twelve minutes. This was only the third five-set match of his career. At the RBC Tennis Championships of Dallas, Edmund defeated Dan Evans in the first all-British Challenger final since 2005, when Alex Bogdanovic beat Mark Hilton.

Edmund, Dan Evans, Dominic Inglot, Andy Murray and Jamie Murray were named for the Davis Cup World Group 1st round match against Japan. On the Wednesday before the tie, Edmund suffered a back injury during practice, so Dan Evans was chosen as the second singles player.

Edmund was Britain's top-ranked singles player for July's Davis Cup quarter final against Serbia in Belgrade, with Andy Murray choosing to sit out the tie following his Wimbledon victory. Edmund defeated Janko Tipsarević in straight sets in the first match and secured an unassailable 3–1 lead for Great Britain by beating Dušan Lajović in the reverse singles, also in straight sets. These were Edmund's first wins in the competition and captain Leon Smith said, "he has every reason to be immensely proud. He was brilliant."

At the US Open, Edmund advanced to the fourth round, after defeating 13th seed Richard Gasquet and Ernesto Escobedo in straight sets and 20th seed John Isner in four sets, but lost to Novak Djokovic in 3 sets.

Edmund reached his first ATP semi-final, at the European Open in October, where he was beaten by the eventual champion Richard Gasquet. Edmund's success pushed his ranking to a career high of no. 40, becoming one of three players aged 21 or under in the world's leading top 40. The other two were Nick Kyrgios and Alexander Zverev.

Edmund was beaten in the second round of the Australian Open, where he faced 30th seed Pablo Carreño Busta.

At the Davis Cup World Group first round match against Canada, Edmund lost his first singles match, but in the deciding rubber, he won his second by default. He was two sets ahead against 17-year-old Denis Shapovalov, when during a third set interval, the frustrated Shapovalov launched a ball into the stands only for it to strike the French umpire Arnaud Gabas in the eye. This resulted in an automatic disqualification for Canada, and Great Britain progressed to the quarter-finals.

The Indian Wells Masters resulted in a second round loss against Novak Djokovic.

Edmund participated in the Davis Cup quarter final with France, where Edmund was beaten by the world number 17 Lucas Pouille in the first singles match. This was followed by defeats for Dan Evans, then Jamie Murray and Dominic Inglot in the doubles. Great Britain eventually lost 4–1, as Edmund lost his dead rubber match.

In the Monte-Carlo Masters, Edmund had a second round defeat by Rafael Nadal. In the third round of the French Open, Edmund succumbed to Kevin Anderson in five sets.

Weeks later, Edmund reached the second round of Wimbledon for the first time, beating British compatriot Alex Ward in the first round before losing to the Frenchman Gaël Monfils.

Edmund parted from coach Ryan Jones during the grass court season, and hired Mark Hilton, who became available following Dan Evans' drug ban. Edmund also began a trial period with Fredrik Rosengren, which became permanent in October.

In August he lost in the first round to David Ferrer at the Montreal Masters despite being a set up. Edmund reached the 3rd round of the US Open, a run which included a win over the 32nd seed Robin Haase, but Edmund retired hurt whilst he was 2 sets to 1 down against the Canadian youngster Denis Shapovalov. Edmund reached the semi-finals of the Vienna Open, his second ATP 500 semi final, before losing to Lucas Pouille. The week after, Edmund reached the second round of the Paris Masters, saving match point to beat Evgeny Donskoy before losing to eventual champion Jack Sock after leading 5–1 against him in the final set.

=== 2018: Breakthrough, British No.1, top 15, first title ===
Edmund started the year in the 2018 Brisbane International as World number 50. In his first two official matches of the season he defeated Denis Shapovalov and Hyeon Chung, both in three sets, before losing to the World number 3, top seed and defending champion Grigor Dimitrov also in three sets. At 4–4 in the third set, Edmund was wrong-footed by Dimitrov in a rally, injuring his ankle, but nonetheless participated in the 2018 Australian Open. At the Australian Open, Edmund proved that he was healthy by ousting 11th seed Kevin Anderson in a grueling, first round five-set match. Edmund went on to eliminate Denis Istomin in straight sets, and then Nikoloz Basilashvili in another five-setter to reach round four, where he beat Andreas Seppi to make his first Grand Slam quarterfinal. There, he grabbed first win over a top 10 opponent, defeating third seed Grigor Dimitrov in four sets to make his first semi final. Edmund lost the semi-final to Marin Čilić in straight sets. By reaching the semi-final of a Grand Slam, only the 6th British man to do so in the Open Era, Edmund caught the public eye and became a better known name to the British public. Edmund reached a career high ranking of 26 following his exploits in Melbourne, and in March became the British number one ranked player replacing Andy Murray, who had held that position since 2006.

He reached his first ATP final in April 2018 in Marrakesh by defeating Richard Gasquet in the semi-finals but lost to Pablo Andújar in straight sets in the final. Despite the defeat it pushed him to a career high ranking of 23.

With compatriot Cameron Norrie, Edmund won the doubles title at the Estoril Open on 6 May 2018. They did not drop a set in the tournament together.

At the 2018 Madrid Open he defeated former world number one Novak Djokovic, gaining enough ATP points to enter the top 20 for the first time. This was the first time Edmund defeated a current or former world number 1 player in competitive play, as well as his first time reaching the third round of a Masters 1000 tournament. He followed this up by defeating his second top 10 seed of the tournament David Goffin in the 3rd round, marking another career milestone by reaching the quarter-finals of a Masters 1000 tournament for the first time. He lost to second-time Masters 1000 quarterfinalist Denis Shapovalov in the quarterfinals.

Following this, Edmund made it to the final 16 at the 2018 Italian Open, defeating 16th seed Lucas Pouille in 2 sets, before losing to 2nd seed and eventual runner-up Alexander Zverev. Despite this defeat, he gained enough ATP points to earn a career high of 17th in the world, as well as a seeding at the forthcoming French Open, representing the first time in which he was seeded at the Grand Slam level.

At the 2018 French Open, Edmund defeated Alex de Minaur and Márton Fucsovics en route to reaching the 3rd round for the second year running. He lost to 18th seed Fabio Fognini in five sets.

Edmund began his grass-court season at the 2018 Queen's Club Championships. This marked his first time of his career to play on home soil as the British Number One. As the 7th seed, he defeated Ryan Harrison before narrowly losing to Nick Kyrgios in three sets. At the 2018 Eastbourne International, Edmund entered as the 2nd seed, hence receiving a bye into the 2nd round. He defeated a returning Andy Murray for the first time in his career. However, Edmund lost from a set up against Mikhail Kukushkin in the quarterfinals.

Edmund entered Wimbledon as the British number one, and thrilled the home crowds with straightforward victories over Alex Bolt followed by Bradley Klahn, allowing him to reach the third round of Wimbledon for the first time. However, he was stopped by the eventual champion Novak Djokovic in four sets.

Edmund's American hard-court swing began with consecutive losses to Andy Murray at the Washington Open and Diego Schwartzman at the Canadian Open, before recording his first ever win at the Cincinnati Masters, defeating Mackenzie McDonald in the first round. He then lost to Denis Shapovalov in straight sets. After losing to Steve Johnson at the Winston-Salem Open, Edmund's American hard-court campaign ended with a first round loss to Paolo Lorenzi at the 2018 US Open, suffering from cramp as the match progressed.

Following his disappointing US hard court swing, Edmund headed to Chicago as part of Team Europe in the Laver Cup. He beat Jack Sock in a deciding set tiebreak on Day One to help Team Europe defend their crown. Edmund carried this momentum into his own Asian swing, where he first headed to Beijing. Here, Edmund made his third semi final of the year, where he was edged out by the eventual champion Nikoloz Basilashvili. One week later, Edmund made his second quarter final at an ATP Masters 1000 event, where he was knocked out in the last 8 by Alexander Zverev. After this, Edmund headed to Europe where he would play his final few events of the year, starting in Antwerp where Edmund was named as a top seed for the first time. Edmund fell short to Richard Gasquet in the semi-finals, to deny Edmund from reaching his second ATP final of his career. Up against Gaël Monfils, Edmund's nerves seemed to be getting the better of him, as he lost the first set to the Frenchman. However, his accurate serve, booming forehand and mental toughness saw him complete a remarkable comeback, with a stunning forehand winner down the line clinching a very emotional first title for Edmund. Just days later, Edmund headed to Vienna where his good form continued with an excellent win over Diego Schwartzman but he was ousted in the next round by Fernando Verdasco. This would turn out to be Edmunds last match of 2018, as he withdrew from the Paris Masters with a knee injury.

=== 2019–20: Early season rankings fall, Challenger & Second ATP titles ===
Edmund started the 2019 season as the third seed at the Brisbane International, where he lost to unseeded Yasutaka Uchiyama. Defending a semifinal appearance at the Australian Open, he was seeded 13th, but was defeated in straight sets by veteran Tomáš Berdych in the first round.

He won the 2020 New York Open, his second title.

=== 2021: Injury, hiatus due to surgery ===
Edmund missed the 2021 Australian Open because of a chronic injury to his left knee. The injury essentially ended his season.

=== 2022: Comeback at Wimbledon in mixed doubles & Washington in singles ===
Edmund made his return at the mixed doubles event of the 2022 Wimbledon Championships, partnering Olivia Nicholls, losing in the first round. He made his return to singles in Washington of the same year, winning his first singles match back in straight sets against qualifier Yosuke Watanuki. He lost to 16th seed and compatriot Dan Evans in the second round.

At the 2022 US Open he used also protected ranking but lost to fifth seed and eventual finalist Casper Ruud.

=== 2023-25: Back to the ITF circuit, retirement ===
At the 2023 Australian Open he was able to compete in the singles tournament via protected ranking, but lost in the first round to 15th seed Jannik Sinner. He used his protected ranking to enter the main draw of the 2023 Miami Open where he also lost in the first round to Wu Yibing.

In April 2023, he entered a Futures ITF event in Santa Margherita di Pula due to lack of matches. Next he entered the main draws directly via protected ranking at the clay court tournaments, the 2023 BMW Open, the 2023 Mutua Madrid Open and the 2023 Italian Open. He withdrew from the 2023 French Open due to a wrist injury.

In June 2024, he returned to his home Slam 2024 Wimbledon Championships after four years of absence in singles and six in men's doubles to play with compatriot Oliver Crawford.

In September 2024, Edmund reached his first ATP Challenger Tour semi-final since 2019 at the Columbus Challenger, defeating three players ranked higher than him, before losing to eventual champion Naki Nakagawa.

He reached the final at the Nottingham Challenger II in July 2025, losing to fellow Briton Jack Pinnington Jones in straight sets. That proved to be Edmund's final professional tennis match as he announced his retirement on 18 August 2025.

== Playing style ==
Edmund was an offensive baseliner. Edmund possesses a western forehand grip, on which he can generate a huge amount of power and spin. His forehand has been described by Mats Wilander as "the best in the business". Edmund uses his forehand to dominate rallies and can also hit winners from anywhere on the court. Edmund's forehand is nicknamed as "fearhand". Edmund's game is also backed up by a powerful serve and solid two-handed backhand, both of which have shown improvement recently. Notable weaknesses of Edmund's game are his fitness and movement, but these have also improved in recent years, demonstrated by his deeper runs at Grand Slams.

== Performance timeline ==
Key
W	F	SF	QF	#R	RR	Q#	P#	DNQ	A	Z#	PO	G	S	B	NMS	NTI	P	NH

(W) winner; (F) finalist; (SF) semifinalist; (QF) quarterfinalist; (#R) rounds 4, 3, 2, 1; (RR) round-robin stage; (Q#) qualification round; (P#) preliminary round; (DNQ) did not qualify; (A) absent; (Z#) Davis/Fed Cup Zonal Group (with number indication) or (PO) play-off; (G) gold, (S) silver or (B) bronze Olympic/Paralympic medal; (NMS) not a Masters tournament; (NTI) not a Tier I tournament; (P) postponed; (NH) not held; (SR) strike rate (events won / competed); (W–L) win–loss record.
To avoid confusion and double counting, these charts are updated at the conclusion of a tournament or when the player's participation has ended.

=== Singles ===
Current through the 2025 French Open.

Tournament	2012	2013	2014	2015	2016	2017	2018	2019	2020	2021	2022	2023	2024	2025	SR	W–L	Win %
Grand Slam tournaments
Australian Open	A	A	A	1R	1R	2R	SF	1R	1R	A	A	1R	A	A	0 / 7	6–7	46%
French Open	A	A	A	2R*	2R	3R	3R	2R	A	A	A	A	A	A	0 / 5	7–4	64%
Wimbledon	Q2	1R	1R	1R	1R	2R	3R	2R	NH	A	A	A	A	A	0 / 7	4–7	36%
US Open	A	A	A	Q3	4R	3R	1R	1R	2R	A	1R	A	A		0 / 6	6–6	50%
Win–loss	0–0	0–1	0–1	1–2	4–4	6–4	9–4	2–4	1–2	0–0	0–1	0–1	0–0	0–0	0 / 25	23–24	49%
National and international representation
Summer Olympics	A	not held			2R	not held				A	NH		A	NH	0 / 1	1–1	50%
Davis Cup	A	A	A	W	SF	QF	A	SF	A	A	A	A	A		1 / 4	6–5	55%
ATP 1000 tournaments
Indian Wells Open	A	A	A	A	1R	2R	2R	4R	NH	A	A	A	A	A	0 / 4	3–4	43%
Miami Open	A	A	1R	1R	2R	1R	2R	4R	NH	A	A	1R	A	A	0 / 7	3–7	30%
Monte-Carlo Masters	A	A	A	A	A	2R	1R	1R	NH	A	A	A	A	A	0 / 3	1–3	25%
Madrid Open	A	A	A	A	A	A	QF	1R	NH	A	A	1R	A	A	0 / 3	3–3	50%
Italian Open	A	A	A	A	A	2R	3R	1R	1R	A	A	1R	A	A	0 / 5	3–5	36%
Canadian Open	A	A	A	A	1R	1R	1R	2R	NH	A	A	A	A		0 / 4	1–4	20%
Cincinnati Open	A	A	A	A	Q2	1R	2R	1R	1R	A	A	A	A		0 / 4	1–4	20%
Shanghai Masters	A	A	A	A	2R	2R	QF	1R	NH			A	A		0 / 4	5–4	56%
Paris Masters	A	A	A	A	A	2R	A	3R	A	A	A	A	A		0 / 2	3–2	67%
Win–loss	0–0	0–0	0–1	0–1	2–4	5–8	9–8	7–8	0–2	0–0	0–0	0–3	0–0	0–0	0 / 36	23–36	39%
Career statistics
	2012	2013	2014	2015	2016	2017	2018	2019	2020	2021	2022	2023	2024	2025	Career		
Tournaments	0	3	5	5	19	27	22	22	10	0	3	7	0	0	123		
Titles	0	0	0	0	0	0	1	0	1	0	0	0	0	0	2		
Finals	0	0	0	0	0	0	2	0	1	0	0	0	0	0	3		
Overall win–loss	0–0	1–3	0–5	1–5	21–20	30–30	37–21	17–22	10–9	0–0	2–3	0–7	0–0	0–0	119–125		
Year-end ranking	571	376	194	102	45	50	14	69	48	121	581	538	357		49%		

* Edmund withdrew before the second round match at the 2015 French Open due to an injury (so doesn't count as a loss).

== ATP career finals ==
=== Singles: 3 (2 titles, 1 runner-up) ===
Legend Grand Slam (0–0) ATP Finals (0–0) ATP 1000 (0–0) ATP 500 (0–0) ATP 250 (2–1)	Finals by surface Hard (2–0) Clay (0–1) Grass (0–0)	Finals by setting Outdoor (0–1) Indoor (2–0)

Result	W–L	Date	Tournament	Tier	Surface	Opponent	Score
Loss	0–1	Apr 2018	Grand Prix Hassan II, Morocco	ATP 250	Clay	(Spain) Pablo Andújar	2–6, 2–6
Win	1–1	Oct 2018	European Open, Belgium	ATP 250	Hard (i)	(France) Gaël Monfils	3–6, 7–6^{(7–2)}, 7–6^{(7–4)}
Win	2–1	Feb 2020	New York Open, United States	ATP 250	Hard (i)	(Italy) Andreas Seppi	7–5, 6–1

=== Doubles: 1 (1 title) ===
Result	W–L	Date	Tournament	Tier	Surface	Partner	Opponents	Score
Win	1–0	May 2018	Estoril Open, Portugal	ATP 250	Clay	(United Kingdom) Cameron Norrie	(Netherlands) Wesley Koolhof (New Zealand) Artem Sitak	6–4, 6–2

== ATP Challenger finals ==
=== Singles: 9 (6–3) ===
Result	W–L	Date	Tournament	Surface	Opponent	Score
Loss	0–1	Nov 2014	Yokohama, Japan	Hard	(Australia) John Millman	4–6, 4–6
Win	1–1	Feb 2015	Hong Kong, Hong Kong	Hard	(Japan) Tatsuma Ito	6–1, 6–2
Win	2–1	Jul 2015	Binghamton, United States	Hard	(United States) Bjorn Fratangelo	6–2, 6–3
Win	3–1	Nov 2015	Buenos Aires, Argentina	Clay	(Argentina) Carlos Berlocq	6–0, 6–4
Loss	3–2	Jan 2016	Lahaina, United States	Hard	(China) Wu Di	6–4, 3–6, 4–6
Win	4–2	Feb 2016	Dallas, United States	Hard (i)	(United Kingdom) Dan Evans	6–3, 6–2
Win	5–2	May 2016	Rome, Italy	Clay	(Serbia) Filip Krajinović	7–6^{(7–2)}, 6–0
Win	6–2	Mar 2019	Indian Wells, United States	Hard	(Russia) Andrey Rublev	6–3, 6–2
Loss	6–3	Jul 2025	Nottingham, United Kingdom	Grass	(United Kingdom) Jack Pinnington Jones	4–6, 6–7^{(1–7)}

=== Doubles: 1 (0–1) ===
Result	W–L	Date	Tournament	Surface	Partner	Opponents	Score
Loss	0–1	Feb 2024	Glasgow, United Kingdom	Hard (i)	(United Kingdom) Henry Searle	(United Kingdom) Scott Duncan (United Kingdom) Marcus Willis	3–6, 2–6

== ITF finals ==
=== Singles: 11 (7–4) ===
Result	W–L	Date	Tournament	Surface	Opponent	Score
Win	1–0	Oct 2012	USA F29, Birmingham	Clay	(United States) Chase Buchanan	7–6^{(7–2)}, 2–6, 6–4
Loss	1–1	Nov 2012	USA F31, Niceville	Clay	(United States) Chase Buchanan	6–3, 6–7^{(4–7)}, 5–7
Win	2–1	May 2013	USA F11, Vero Beach	Clay	(Australia) Carsten Ball	6–3, 6–2
Win	3–1	Aug 2013	Italy F20, Bolzano	Clay	(Italy) Gianluca Naso	6–3, 6–2
Win	4–1	Jan 2014	USA F2, Sunrise	Clay	(Japan) Yoshihito Nishioka	6–0, 6–3
Loss	4–2	Jan 2014	USA F3, Weston	Clay	(Romania) Victor Crivoi	7–6^{(7–2)}, 5–7, 0–6
Win	5–2	Feb 2014	Croatia F1, Zagreb	Hard (i)	(Croatia) Filip Veger	6–2, 7–5
Loss	5–3	Oct 2023	M25 Edgbaston, United Kingdom	Hard (i)	(United Kingdom) Jacob Fearnley	3–6, 1–6
Win	6–3	Jan 2024	M25 Loughborough, United Kingdom	Hard (i)	(Poland) Martyn Pawelski	6–4, 6–4
Win	7–3	Jan 2024	M25 Sunderland, United Kingdom	Hard (i)	(United Kingdom) Hamish Stewart	7–5, 3–6, 6–3
Loss	7–4	May 2025	M25 Reggio Emilia, Italy	Clay	(Slovakia) Alex Molčan	2–6, 1–6

== Junior Grand Slam finals ==
=== Doubles: 2 (2 titles) ===
Result	Year	Championship	Surface	Partner	Opponents	Score
Win	2012	US Open	Hard	(Portugal) Frederico Ferreira Silva	(Australia) Nick Kyrgios (Australia) Jordan Thompson	5–7, 6–4, [10–6]
Win	2013	French Open	Clay	(Portugal) Frederico Ferreira Silva	(Chile) Cristian Garín (Chile) Nicolás Jarry	6–3, 6–3

== Wins over top-10 player ==
#	Player	Rk	Event	Surface	Rd	Score	Rk
2018
1.	(Bulgaria) Grigor Dimitrov	3	Australian Open, Australia	Hard	QF	6–4, 3–6, 6–3, 6–4	49
2.	(Belgium) David Goffin	10	Madrid Open, Spain	Clay	3R	6–3, 6–3	22
