= Tatsuma Ito =

Japanese tennis player (born 1988)

Tatsuma Ito Japanese: 伊藤 竜馬
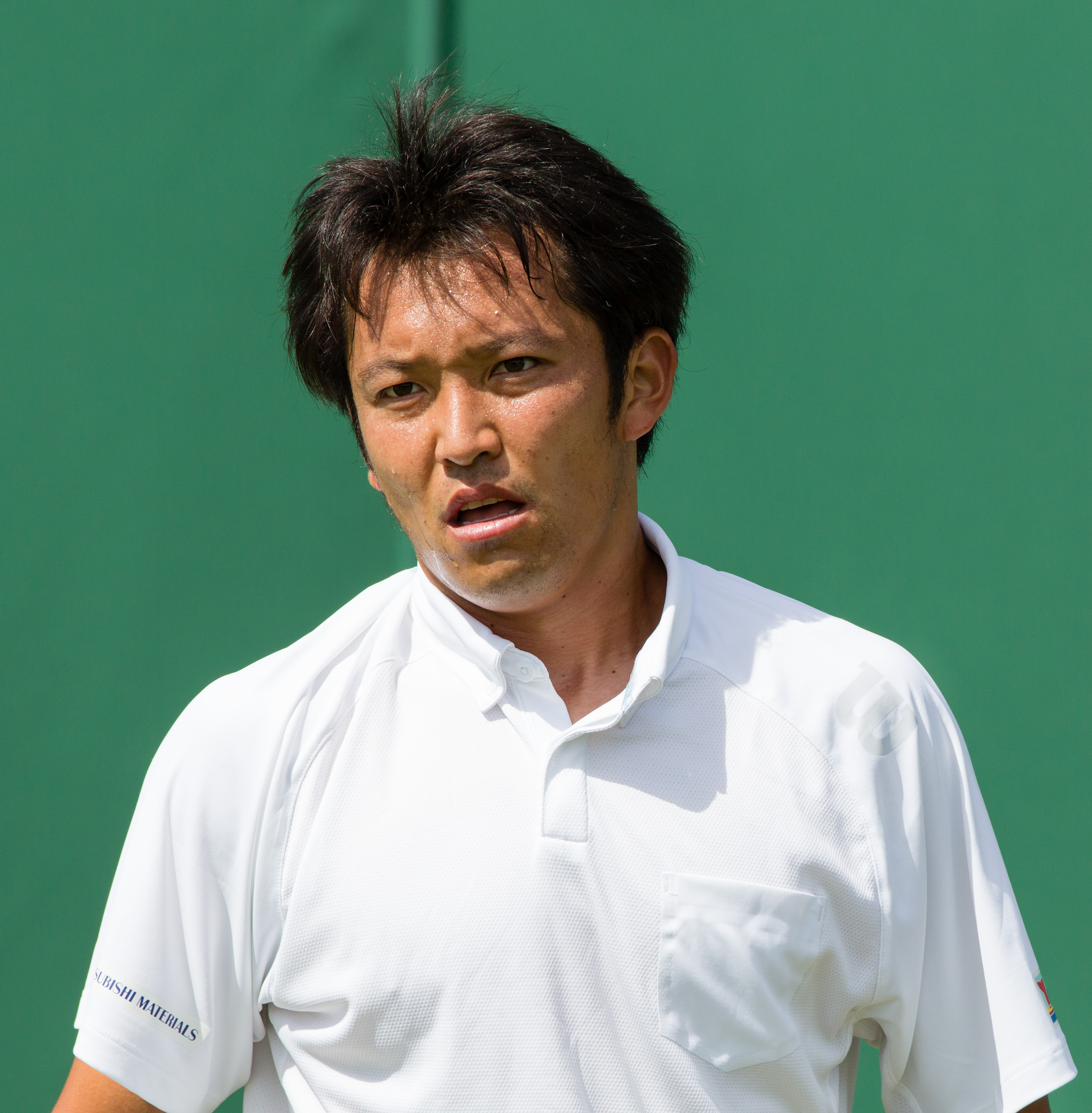
- Full name: Tatsuma Ito
- Country (sports): Japan
- Born: 18 May 1988 (age 38) Inabe, Japan
- Height: 1.80 m (5 ft 11 in)
- Turned pro: December 2006
- Retired: 2024
- Plays: Right-handed (two-handed backhand)
- Coach: Alexander Waske
- Prize money: $1,794,871

Singles
- Career record: 36–66
- Career titles: 0
- Highest ranking: No. 60 (22 October 2012)

Grand Slam singles results
- Australian Open: 2R (2012, 2013, 2020)
- French Open: 1R (2012, 2015)
- Wimbledon: 1R (2012, 2014)
- US Open: 2R (2014)

Other tournaments
- Olympic Games: 1R (2012)

Doubles
- Career record: 3–16
- Career titles: 0
- Highest ranking: No. 312 (9 June 2014)

Grand Slam doubles results
- US Open: 1R (2012)
Medal record
Representing Japan
Men's Tennis
Asian Games
Bronze medal – third place	2010 Guangzhou	Singles
Bronze medal – third place	2010 Guangzhou	Team
Bronze medal – third place	2014 Incheon	Team
East Asian Games
Silver medal – second place	2009 Hong Kong	Singles
Bronze medal – third place	2009 Hong Kong	Doubles

Tatsuma Ito (伊藤 竜馬, Itō Tatsuma; born 18 May 1988) is a Japanese former professional tennis player. He has won 7 Challenger tournaments and achieved a career-high singles ranking of World No. 60 in October 2012.

Ito reached the quarterfinals of 's-Hertogenbosch and Moscow in 2012 and Newport and Bogota in 2015.

== Career ==
=== Junior career ===
As a junior, he compiled a 28–9 win–loss record in singles (and 14–9 in doubles), achieving a combined ranking of No.75 in the world in October 2006.

=== 2007–09 ===
Ito had won six ITF Futures events in Asian countries, and started to play mainly in ATP Challenger Tour since 2008. In November 2009, he reached first challenger final in Toyota, losing to Uladzimir Ignatik with straight sets. In ATP World Tour event, Ito received wildcard for his first ATP main draw at the 2008 Japan Open in Tokyo.

=== 2010 ===
In August, Ito claimed first challenger title in his career at Brasília by beating Izak van der Merwe in the final. After that, he reached third round of qualifying for the second straight year in 2010 US Open before losing to American Robert Kendrick. In later season, Ito earned men's singles bronze medal in 2010 Asian Games at Guangzhou, winning over defending champion Danai Udomchoke of Thailand in quarterfinals. He also earned men's team bronze medal. In Toyota challenger, he defeated his countryman Yuichi Sugita in the final to win second challenger title of the season.

=== 2011: Grand Slam debut ===
In April, Ito claimed his third challenger title in Recife after Tiago Fernandes withdrew before the finals, and he entered world's top 150 for the first time, climbing to no.133. The next month, he reached the Busan Challenger final. He defeated top seed Lu Yen-hsun in semifinal, but lost to Dudi Sela with three sets.

In American hard court season, Ito recorded his first ATP main draw win in Atlanta, winning over Michael Berrer in the first round. He fell in the second round to eighth seed Somdev Devvarman. He made his debut at a Grand Slam tournament at the 2011 US Open, losing to 25th seed Feliciano López in the first round. He took part in the Japan Open, and defeat Dudi Sela with three sets to proceed to the second round before losing to Australian Bernard Tomic. At the end of season, he successfully defended his title in Toyota where he beat Sebastian Rieschick in the final.

=== 2012: Olympics participation, top 60 ===
Ito qualified for the Brisbane International, and got through the opening round against Benjamin Mitchell in straight sets. He received wildcard for 2012 Australian Open, and advanced to second round of the major tournaments for the first time, beating Italian Potito Starace with four sets. He was beaten by Nicolas Mahut in the next round. In March, Ito broke him into the top 100 for the first time, winning the Kyoto Challenger title by beating Malek Jaziri in final.

In spring clay court season, Ito reached the second round in Houston, winning over fellow Japanese Go Soeda. He was defeated by eventual champion Juan Mónaco. He faced world no.4 Andy Murray in the 2012 French Open first round, losing in straight sets. In grass court season, Ito reached the round two in Queen's Club, and made his first ATP quarterfinal in the UNICEF Open. He knocked out third seed Jürgen Melzer on the way, but he eventually lost to Benoît Paire in straight sets. He suffered a first-round loss to Łukasz Kubot in 2012 Wimbledon Championships.

Ito represented Japan at his maiden Olympics in London 2012. He competed in the singles competition, but fell in the first round to Milos Raonic of Canada in straight sets. In 2012 US Open, he lost to Matthew Ebden in opening round. Ito participated in the Japan Open with wildcard, and upset world no.12 Nicolás Almagro in first round. He lost in the second round to Dmitry Tursunov. He reached quarterfinal in the Kremlin Cup to mark his career-high ranking world No.60, beating Roberto Bautista Agut and Konstantin Kravchuk. He lost to eventual champion Andreas Seppi.

=== 2013 ===
Ito opened the season in Brisbane where he lost to qualifier John Millman in first round. He then entered into the 2013 Australian Open main draw, and got revenge over John Millman with five-setter. He was beaten by 28th seed Marcos Baghdatis in second round. After falling in the second round to Sergiy Stakhovsky at Montpellier, Ito competed in Indian Wells to make his Masters main draw debut, losing to Evgeny Donskoy in opening round. In the Miami Masters, he also was eliminated in the first round by Olivier Rochus.

In Asian swing, Ito participated in the ATP events of Tokyo and Shanghai, falling in the first round both events. Two weeks later, he reached final in the Melbourne Challenger, losing to top seed Matthew Ebden in three sets.

=== 2014: First top-5 win ===
In grass court season, Ito won through the qualifying at the 2014 Wimbledon Championships by beating Ričardas Berankis from two sets down. He lost to lucky loser Simone Bolelli in the first round. He then participated in Hall of Fame Tennis Championships and got through first round, but retired during the second round match.

Ito qualified for the 2014 US Open, and advanced to second round after his opponent, Steve Johnson, retired due to cramping. His run was ended by 19th seed Feliciano López in next match. In the Japan Open, Ito was given a wildcard and scored his career biggest win in the first round, beating top seed and reigning Australian Open champion Stan Wawrinka 7–5, 6–2. This was his first ever win over a top-5 player. He was beaten by unseeded Benjamin Becker in the second round. On the ATP Challenger Tour, Ito reached the finals of five tournaments, but lost in all matches.

=== 2015 ===
Ito started the season by playing in Chennai, and reached second round before losing to Guillermo García-López in three sets. After falling to 31st seed Martin Kližan in the 2015 Australian Open first round, he made it to final in the Hong Kong Challenger, being beaten by Kyle Edmund. He competed in the 2015 French Open main draw for the first time since 2012, but he was eliminated in the first round by 28th seed Fabio Fognini.

Ito went on to participate in the Topshelf Open as a qualifier, and beat Ričardas Berankis in the first round. He was ousted by Ivo Karlović in the next round. Ito bounced back from the failure to qualify for the Wimbledon by reaching the quarterfinal in Newport, defeating seventh seed Steve Johnson and Noah Rubin. He then made back to back quarterfinal appearances in the Colombia Open by beating Alejandro Gómez and Matthew Ebden before losing to eventual champion Bernard Tomic in straight sets.

=== 2016: First Masters win ===
Ito qualified for the 2016 Australian Open main draw, losing to fellow qualifier Radek Štěpánek in the first round in four sets. In March, he won all his matches in the qualifying tournament of the Miami Open and recorded his first Masters main draw win after beating Nicolas Mahut in straight sets. He lost to 16th seed Gaël Monfils in the second round.

=== 2024: Retirement ===
in April 2024, Ito announced that he would retire at the end of the season.

== ATP Challenger and ITF finals ==
=== Singles: 33 (15–18) ===
Legend (singles) ATP Challenger Tour (7–13) ITF Futures Tour (8–5)	Titles by surface Hard (12–12) Clay (0–2) Grass (0–0) Carpet (3–4)

Result	W–L	Date	Tournament	Tier	Surface	Opponent	Score
Win	1–0	Oct 2007	Japan F11, Tokyo	Futures	Hard	(United States) Phillip King	7–5, 6–2
Win	2–0	Feb 2008	Thailand F1, Nonthaburi	Futures	Hard	(China) Yan Bai	3–6, 7–6^{(11–9)}, 6–4
Win	3–0	Mar 2008	Japan F1. Nishitama	Futures	Hard	(Chinese Taipei) Ti Chen	6–2, 6–4
Win	4–0	May 2008	Korea F1, Gimcheon	Futures	Hard	(Kazakhstan) Alexey Kedryuk	1–6, 6–3, 7–6^{(9–7)}
Win	5–0	Oct 2008	Japan F10, Kashiwa	Futures	Hard	(Japan) Hiroki Kondo	5–7, 6–3, 6–4
Loss	5–1	Mar 2009	New Zealand F2, Hamilton	Futures	Hard	(Australia) Carsten Ball	6–7^{(1–7)}, 2–6
Loss	5–2	Apr 2009	Korea F1, Daegu	Futures	Hard	(South Korea) Yongkyu Lim	6–7^{(1–7)}, 6–2, 1–6
Win	6–2	Apr 2009	Korea F2, Seogwipo	Futures	Hard	(South Korea) Yong-Bum Seo	6–4, 3–6, 6–1
Loss	6–3	Nov 2009	Toyota, Japan	Challenger	Carpet (i)	(Belarus) Uladzimir Ignatik	6–7^{(7–9)}, 6–7^{(3–7)}
Win	7–3	Jun 2010	Guam F1, Tumon	Futures	Hard	(Japan) Junn Mitsuhashi	6–2, 6–4
Win	8–3	Aug 2010	Brasília, Brazil	Challenger	Hard	(South Africa) Izak van der Merwe	6–4, 6–4
Win	9–3	Nov 2010	Toyota, Japan	Challenger	Carpet (i)	(Japan) Yuichi Sugita	6–4, 6–2
Win	10–3	Apr 2011	Recife, Brazil	Challenger	Hard	(Brazil) Tiago Fernandes	w/o
Loss	10–4	May 2011	Busan, South Korea	Challenger	Hard	(Israel) Dudi Sela	2–6, 7–6^{(7–5)}, 3–6
Win	11–4	May 2011	Toyota, Japan	Challenger	Carpet (i)	(Germany) Sebastian Rieschick	6–4, 6–2
Win	12–4	Mar 2012	Kyoto, Japan	Challenger	Carpet (i)	(Tunisia) Malek Jaziri	6–7^{(5–7)}, 6–1, 6–2
Loss	12–5	Apr 2012	Kaohsiung, Taiwan	Challenger	Hard	(Japan) Go Soeda	3–6, 0–6
Win	13–5	May 2012	Busan, South Korea	Challenger	Hard	(Australia) John Millman	6–4, 6–3
Loss	13–6	Oct 2013	Melbourne, Australia	Challenger	Hard	(Australia) Matthew Ebden	3–6, 7–5, 3–6
Loss	13–7	Feb 2014	West Lakes, Australia	Challenger	Hard	(United States) Bradley Klahn	3–6, 6–7^{(9–11)}
Loss	13–8	Mar 2014	Kyoto, Japan	Challenger	Hard(i)	(Austria) Martin Fischer	6–3, 5–7, 4–6
Loss	13–9	May 2014	Gimcheon, South Korea	Challenger	Hard	(Luxembourg) Gilles Müller	6–7^{(5–7)} 7–5, 4–6
Loss	13–10	Sep 2014	Istanbul, Turkey	Challenger	Hard	(France) Adrian Mannarino	0–6, 0–2, retired
Loss	13–11	Nov 2014	Toyota, Japan	Challenger	Carpet(i)	(Japan) Go Soeda	4–6, 5–7
Loss	13–12	Feb 2015	Hong Kong, Hong Kong	Challenger	Hard	(United Kingdom) Kyle Edmund	1–6, 2–6
Loss	13–13	Nov 2016	Toyota, Japan	Challenger	Carpet(i)	(Australia) James Duckworth	5–7, 6–4, 1–6
Win	14–13	Apr 2017	Japan F5, Kashiwa	Futures	Hard	(Japan) Masato Shiga	6–4, 6–2
Loss	14–14	Apr 2017	Taipei, Taiwan	Challenger	Carpet(i)	(Chinese Taipei) Lu Yen-hsun	1–6, 6–7^{(4–7)}
Loss	14–15	Mar 2018	Yokohama, Japan	Challenger	Hard	(Japan) Yasutaka Uchiyama	6–2, 3–6, 4–6
Win	15–15	Nov 2018	Kobe, Japan	Challenger	Hard (i)	(Japan) Yosuke Watanuki	3–6, 7–5, 6–3
Loss	15–16	Sep 2022	M25, Sapporo, Japan	Futures	Hard	(Japan) Rio Noguchi	1–6, 0–4, ret.
Loss	15–17	Mar 2023	M25, Canberra, Australia	Futures	Clay	(Australia) Marc Polmans	0–6, 6–4, 4–6
Loss	15–18	Jun 2023	M15, Karuizawa, Japan	Futures	Clay	(Japan) Yuta Kawahashi	5–7, 2–6

=== Doubles: 1 (0–1) ===
Legend
ATP Challenger Tour (0–1)

Outcome	No.	Date	Tournament	Surface	Partner	Opponents	Score
Runner-up	1.	14 March 2009	Kyoto, Japan	Carpet (i)	(Japan) Takao Suzuki	(Pakistan) Aisam-ul-Haq Qureshi (Austria) Martin Slanar	7–6^{(9–7)}, 6–7^{(3–7)}, [6–10]

== Singles performance timeline ==
Key
W	F	SF	QF	#R	RR	Q#	DNQ	A	NH

(W) winner; (F) finalist; (SF) semifinalist; (QF) quarterfinalist; (#R) rounds 4, 3, 2, 1; (RR) round-robin stage; (Q#) qualification round; (DNQ) did not qualify; (A) absent; (NH) not held; (SR) strike rate (events won / competed); (W–L) win–loss record.
To avoid confusion and double counting, these charts are updated at the conclusion of a tournament or when the player's participation has ended.

Tournament	2009	2010	2011	2012	2013	2014	2015	2016	2017	2018	2019	2020	2021
Australian Open	Q1	Q1	Q1	2R	2R	Q1	1R	1R	Q2	Q1	1R	2R	Q1
French Open	A	A	Q1	1R	Q1	Q1	1R	Q1	Q1	A	Q1	Q1	Q1
Wimbledon	A	Q2	Q1	1R	Q2	1R	Q2	A	Q3	Q1	Q1	NH	Q2
US Open	Q3	Q3	1R	1R	Q3	2R	Q1	A	Q2	Q2	Q1	A	Q1
Win–loss	0–0	0–0	0–1	1–4	1–1	1–2	0–2	0–1	0–0	0–0	0–0	0–0	0–0
Career Statistics
Titles–Finals	0–0	0–0	0–0	0–0	0–0	0–0	0–0	0–0	0–0	0–0	0–0	0–0	0–0
Year-end ranking	210	183	122	79	155	94	119	171	153	148	147	186	283
