= Pernambuco Brasil Open Series =

Defunct tennis tournament
- Location: Recife, Brazil
- Category: ATP Challenger Tour
- Surface: Hard
- Draw: 32S/32Q/16D
- Prize money: €35,000+H

The Pernambuco Brasil Open Series was a tennis tournament held in Recife, Brazil in 2011. The event was part of the ATP Challenger Tour and was played on hardcourts.

== Past finals ==
=== Singles ===
Year	Champion	Runner-up	Score
2011	(Japan) Tatsuma Ito	(Brazil) Tiago Fernandes	walkover

=== Doubles ===
Year	Champions	Runners-up	Score
2011	(Ecuador) Giovanni Lapentti (Brazil) Fernando Romboli	(Brazil) André Ghem (Brazil) Rodrigo Guidolin	6–2, 6–1
