= Hong Kong ATP Challenger =

Defunct tennis tournament
- Location: Hong Kong; Hong Kong
- Category: ATP Challenger Tour
- Surface: Hard
- Draw: 32S/27Q/16D
- Prize money: $50,000

The Hong Kong ATP Challenger was a tennis tournament held in Hong Kong since 2015. The event was part of the ATP Challenger Tour and is played on outdoor hardcourts.

This was the first time since 1999 that a Challenger event was held in Hong Kong. This was also the highest-level professional men's tennis tournament held in Hong Kong since the last edition of the Hong Kong Open, an ATP Tour-level event in 2002, before it was held again in 2024.

== Past finals ==
=== Singles ===
Year	Champion	Runner-up	Score
2015	(United Kingdom) Kyle Edmund	(Japan) Tatsuma Ito	6–1, 6–2

=== Doubles ===
Year	Champions	Runners-up	Score
2015	(Chinese Taipei) Hsieh Cheng-peng (Chinese Taipei) Yi Chu-huan	(India) Saketh Myneni (India) Sanam Singh	6–4, 6–2
