= Rio Quente Resorts Tennis Classic =

- 2013 Rio Quente Resorts Tennis Classic

Defunct tennis tournament
- Location: Rio Quente, Brazil
- Category: ATP Challenger Tour
- Surface: Hard
- Draw: 32S/7Q/16D
- Prize money: $35,000+H
- Website: Website

The Rio Quente Resorts Tennis Classic was a tennis tournament held in Rio Quente, Brazil since August 2002. The event was part of the ATP Challenger Tour in 2012-2013 and was played on hardcourts.

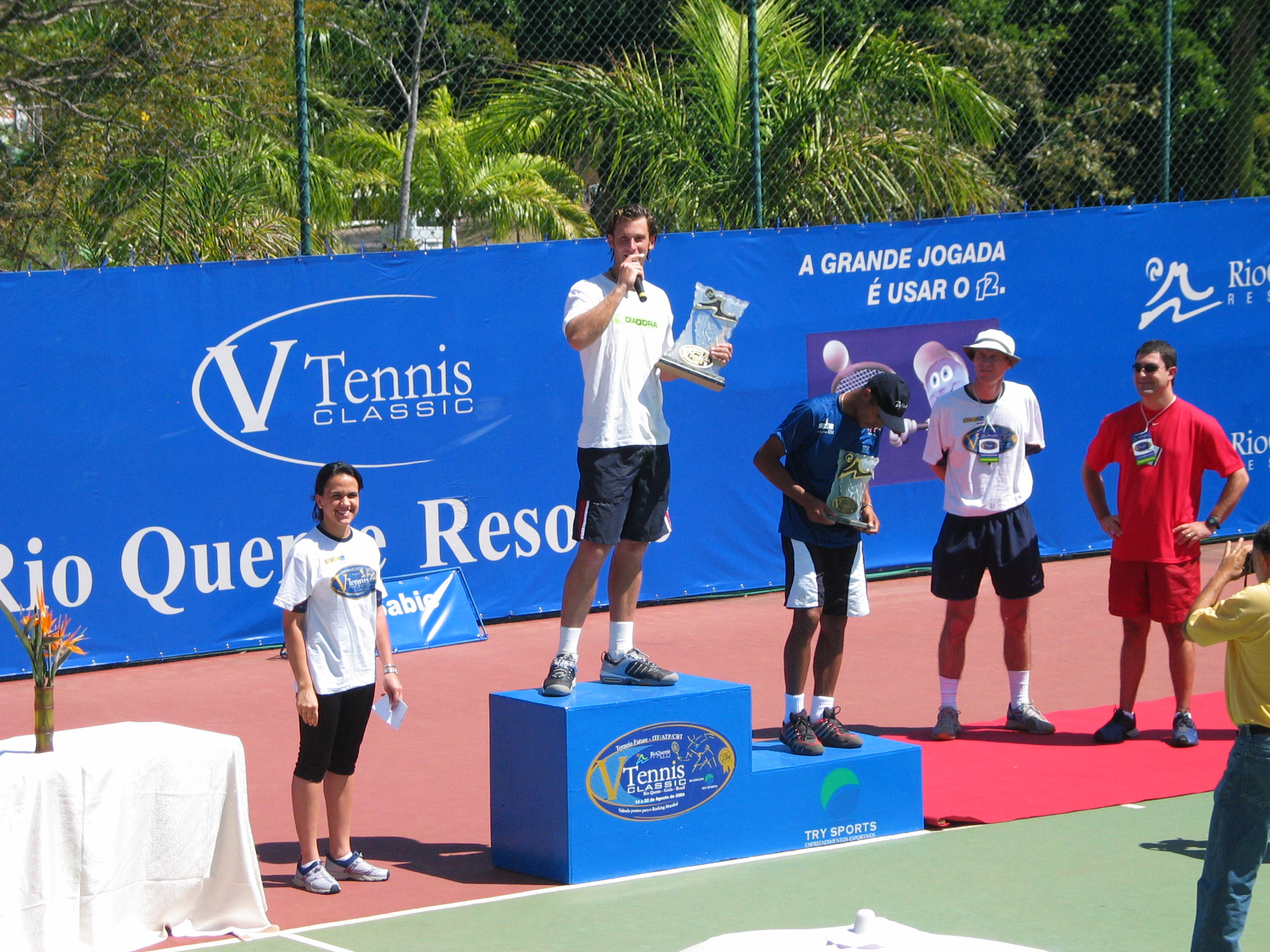
Trophy presentation at the 3rd Rio Quente Tennis Classic in 2004

== Past finals ==
=== Singles ===
Year	Champion	Runner-up	Score
2013	(United States) Rajeev Ram	(Brazil) André Ghem	4–6, 6–4, 6–3
2012	(Brazil) Guilherme Clezar	(Chile) Paul Capdeville	7–6^{(7–4)}, 6–3

=== Doubles ===
Year	Champions	Runners-up	Score
2013	(Brazil) Fabiano de Paula (Brazil) Marcelo Demoliner	(Brazil) Ricardo Hocevar (Brazil) Leonardo Kirche	6–3, 6–4
2012	(Argentina) Guido Andreozzi (Uruguay) Marcel Felder	(Brazil) Thiago Alves (Brazil) Augusto Laranja	6–3, 6–3
