= BVA Open =

Defunct tennis tournament
- Location: São José do Rio Preto; Brazil
- Venue: Harmonia Tênis Clube
- Category: ATP Challenger Tour
- Surface: Clay / Outdoors
- Draw: 32S/32Q/16D
- Prize money: €50,000+H

The BVA Open was a tennis tournament held in São José do Rio Preto, Brazil founded in 2011. The event is part of the ATP Challenger Tour and is played on outdoor clay courts until 2013.

== Past finals ==
=== Singles ===
Year	Champion	Runner-up	Score
2013	(Brazil) João Souza	(Colombia) Alejandro González	7–6^{(7–0)}, 6–3
2011	(Brazil) Ricardo Mello	(Argentina) Eduardo Schwank	6–4, 6–2

=== Doubles ===
Year	Champions	Runners-up	Score
2013	(Colombia) Nicolás Barrientos (Colombia) Carlos Salamanca	(Brazil) Marcelo Demoliner (Brazil) João Souza	6–4, 6–4
2011	(Portugal) Frederico Gil (Czech Republic) Jaroslav Pospíšil	(Brazil) Franco Ferreiro (Spain) Rubén Ramírez Hidalgo	6–4, 6–4
