= Tiago Fernandes (tennis) =

Brazilian tennis player

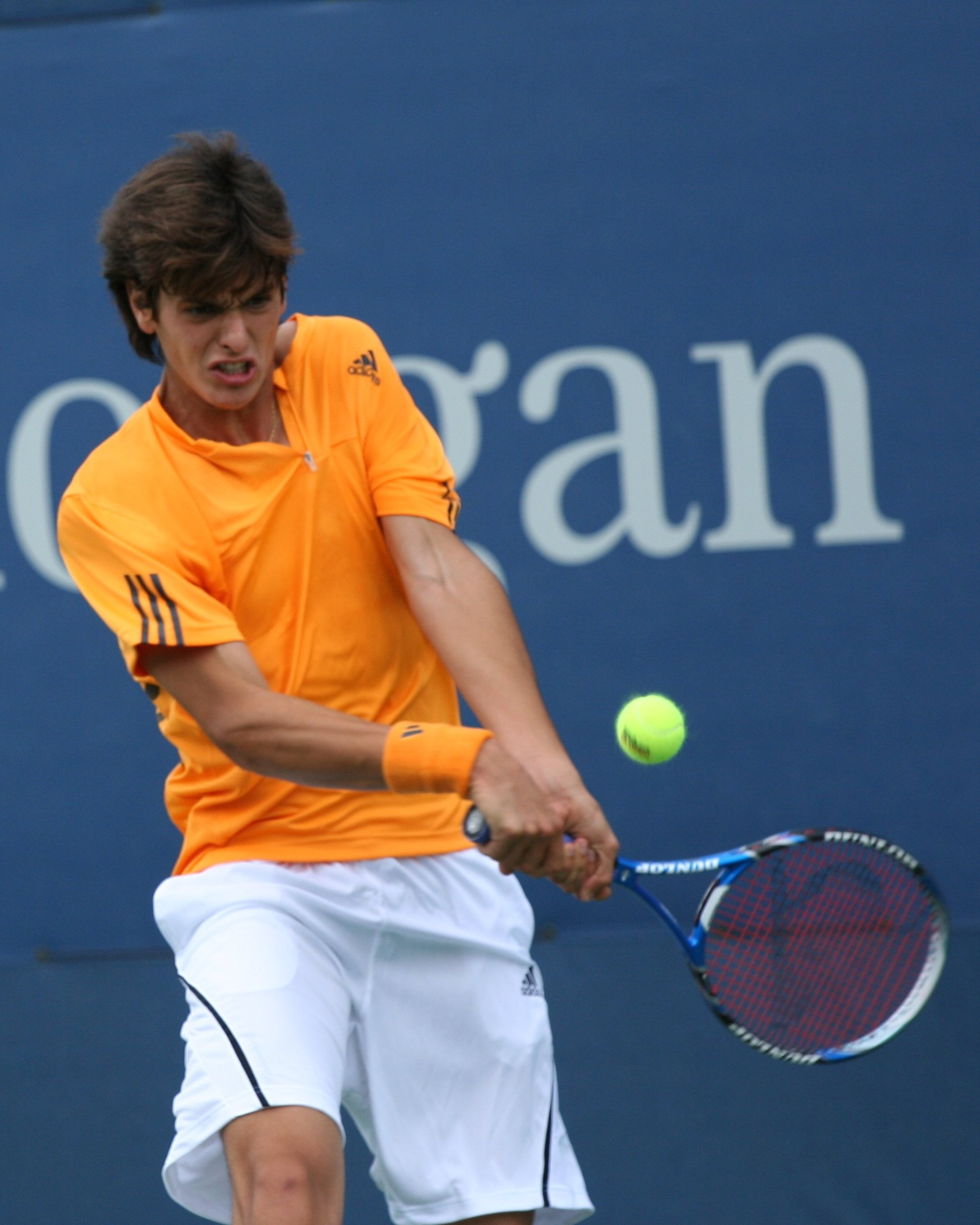
- Fernandes during the 2009 US Open.
- Country (sports): Brazil
- Residence: Florianópolis, Brazil
- Born: January 29, 1993 (age 33) Maceió, Brazil
- Height: 1.88 m (6 ft 2 in)
- Turned pro: 2010
- Retired: 2014
- Plays: Right-handed (two-handed backhand)
- Prize money: US $47,095

Singles
- Career record: 0–0 (at ATP Tour level, Grand Slam level, and in Davis Cup)
- Career titles: 0
- Highest ranking: No. 371 (1 August 2011)

Grand Slam singles results
- Australian Open: Q1 (2011)

Doubles
- Career record: 0–2 (at ATP Tour level, Grand Slam level, and in Davis Cup)
- Career titles: 0
- Highest ranking: No. 483 (16 July 2012)

Tiago Fernandes (born January 29, 1993) is a former Brazilian tennis player. He achieved the No. 1 ranking on the ITF Junior Circuit. Fernandes was coached by Larri Passos, the former coach of Brazilian former world No. 1 and three-time French Open winner Gustavo Kuerten.

Fernandes won the boys' singles title at the 2010 Australian Open, defeating Australian Sean Berman in the final. He was the first Brazilian player to lift a major jr. trophy.

== Career ==
=== 2009-10: Juniors ===
In 2009, Fernandes competed in his first Grand Slam – in the Boys' Singles – at the 2009 French Open. He played against Cedrick Commin, winning 7–5, 6–1, in the second round he lost Richard Becker 6–3, 7–5, 6–3. In 2009 Wimbledon Championships, he reached the third round losing to Devin Britton, 7–5, 6–4. At the 2009 US Open, he reached the Quarterfinals, where he lost to Bernard Tomic 6–1, 6–4, from Australia. At the Junior Australian Open, he became the first Brazilian to win a Junior Grand Slam, defeating Sean Berman 7–5, 6–3 in the final. During the tournament he played against many other higher seeded players like Gianni Mina, in the semifinals where he won 4–6, 7–6, 6–2.

Fernandes was fifth seed at the 2010 Junior French Open, reaching the quarterfinals where he lost to eventual champion, Agustín Velotti, 7–6^{(0)}, 6–1.

As the No. 3 seed at the Junior Wimbledon Championships, Fernandes defeated local wildcard Tom Farquharson in the first round and American qualifier Dane Webb in the second round. He lost to eventual finalist, Australian qualifier Benjamin Mitchell in the third round, 5–7, 4–6.

Fernandes represented Brazil at the 2010 Summer Youth Olympics in the tennis competition. He defeated Peter Heller 6–1, 5–7, 6–4 in the first round and Jozef Kovalik 7–6^{(3)}, 6–1 in the second round to advance to the quarterfinals, where he lost to Victor Baluda, 2–6, 6–7^{(5)}. He and his doubles partner Renzo Olivo defeated Heller and his partner Kevin Krawietz, 6–3, 7–5 to advance to the doubles quarterfinals, where they lost to Diego Galeano and Ricardo Rodriguez.

Fernandes entered the 2010 Junior US Open as the No. 3 seed, defeating American wildcard Mitchell Kreuger in the first round 6–0, 6–1, and Mate Pavić in the second round, 6–3, 7–6^{(5)}, leading to a rematch with Victor Baluda. After dropping the first set 4–6, Fernandes took the second 6–4, but lost the final set 3–6. He reached the semifinals in the Junior US Open doubles competition with his compatriot Guilherme Clézar, defeating the top seeds, Márton Fucsovics and Mate Zsiga in the second round.

=== Professional ===
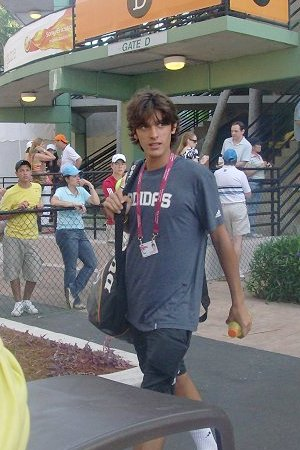
Tiago training at the 2010 Sony Ericsson Open

Following his junior Australian Open title, Fernandes elected to play senior tournaments. He lost in the first round of qualifying at the Prime Cup Aberto de São Paulo challenger and the Brasil Open in Costa do Sauípe and U.S. Men's Clay Court Championships in Houston, ATP 250 events.

He played several ITF Futures tennis tournaments in Brazil, reaching the semifinals at the Brazil F4, losing to Marcel Felder, 4–6, 6–4, 4–6, and the quarterfinals at the Brazil F7, losing to Leonardo Kirche, 2–6, 1–6.

To prepare for the junior Wimbledon Championships, Fernandes played at the UNICEF Open, losing in the first round of qualifying to Aisam-ul-Haq Qureshi, 1–6, 5–7.

Fernandes entered qualifying for the Beijing International Challenger, defeating Jia Li and Hsin-Han Lee to reach the main draw, where he won his first challenger match, defeating Kaden Hensel. Despite losing 4–6, 4–6 to Andrey Kumantsov in the round of 16, Tiago earned 13 points toward his ATP ranking, moving him up 117 spots to a career high ranking of 645.

He received a wild card to play the Samarkand Challenger, drawing top seed Blaž Kavčič in the first round.

Fernandes plays most of his ITF Futures events in his home country of Brazil. He matched his best ever Futures result at the Brazil F28, reaching the semifinals and losing a tight match against the top seed Andre Miele, 7–6^{(5)}, 5–7, 5–7.

He received a wild card in to the main draw in the 2010 Copa Petrobras São Paulo challenger, coming back from a set and a break deficit to defeat fellow Brazilian Augusto Meirelles to win 3–6, 7–5, 6–0, saving three match points. He lost to Nicolas Devilder in the following round.

=== 2011 ===
As the winner of the junior slam the previous year, Fernandes received a wild card into the 2011 Australian Open qualifying draw, suffering a leg injury in his 2–6, 0–6 loss to Evgeny Korolev. After a nearly two-month recovery period that caused him to miss out on the 2011 Brasil Open, he qualified for the main draw at both the 2011 All Japan Indoor Tennis Championships and the 2011 ATP Challenger Guangzhou challengers, reaching the round of 16 at both, which gave him a career high ranking of 509.

Fernandes received a wild card into the main draw at the 2011 Pernambuco Brasil Open Series, and faced lucky loser Tiago Lopes, defeating him 6–4, 4–6, 6–2. He played another up-and-coming Brazilian teenager, Bruno Sant'anna, in the second round, saving set points in the first set. He faced another Brazilian teenager, his friend Guilherme Clezar, in the quarterfinals, winning 6–4, 3–6, 7–6^{(3)}, breaking Clezar as he served for the match to force the final set tiebreak. His biggest victory came against the fourth seed, Júlio Silva. Dropping the first set 2–6, Fernandes fought back following a rain delay and relocation to indoor facilities to win the next two sets, and the match, 2–6, 7–5, 7–6^{(2)}, taking him to a career high of 380 in the world. Citing fatigue and back pain, he withdrew from the final against Tatsuma Ito, and will instead prepare for his next tournament, the 2011 Aberto Santa Catarina De Tenis.

== Retirement ==
In August 2014, Fernandes announced his retirement to focus on his college work.

== ATP Challenger Tour finals ==
=== Singles: 1 (runner-up) ===
Legend ATP Challenger Tour (0–1)

Result	W–L	Date	Tournament	Tier	Surface	Opponent	Score
Loss	0–1	Apr 2011	Brasil Open, Brazil	Challenger	Hard	(Japan) Tatsuma Ito	walkover

== ITF Tour finals ==
=== Singles: 1 (title) ===
Legend ITF Futures (1–0)

Result	W–L	Date	Tournament	Tier	Surface	Opponent	Score
Win	1–0	May 2013	Turkey F17, Antalya	Futures	Hard	(France) Jules Marie	7–5, 6–3

=== Doubles: 6 (1 title, 5 runner-ups) ===
Legend ITF Futures (1–5)	Finals by surface Hard (0–2) Clay (1–3)

Result	W–L	Date	Tournament	Tier	Surface	Partner	Opponents	Score
Loss	0–1	Aug 2009	Brazil F13, Juiz de Fora	Futures	Clay	(Brazil) André Baran	(Argentina) Gastón-Arturo Grimolizzi (Bolivia) Mauricio Doria-Medina	4–6, 1–6
Loss	0–2	Aug 2009	Brazil F15, Rio Claro (RJ)	Futures	Clay	(Brazil) Bruno Semenzato	(France) Marc Auradou (Brazil) Leonardo Kirche	4–6, 4–6
Loss	0–3	Oct 2010	Brazil F28, Fernandópolis	Futures	Clay	(Brazil) Bruno Semenzato	(Sweden) Christian Lindell (Brazil) Fabrício Neis	walkover
Loss	0–4	Mar 2013	Turkey F9, Antalya	Futures	Hard	(Brazil) Eduardo Dischinger	(China) Peng Gao (China) Wan Gao	4–6, 4–6
Loss	0–5	Sep 2013	Greece F12, Athens	Futures	Hard	(Republic of Ireland) Sam Barry	(Netherlands) Kevin Griekspoor (Netherlands) Scott Griekspoor	7–6^{(7–5)}, 3–6, [5–10]
Win	1–5	Feb 2014	Argentina F3, Villa Allende	Futures	Clay	(Brazil) Bruno Sant'Anna	(Argentina) Valentín Florez (Argentina) Patricio Heras	7–5, 6–1

== Junior Grand Slam finals ==
=== Singles: 1 (title) ===
Result	Year	Tournament	Surface	Opponent	Score
Win	2010	Australian Open	Hard	(Australia) Sean Berman	7–5, 6–3
