= Augusto Laranja =

Brazilian tennis player

- Country (sports): Brazil
- Born: 15 April 1992 (age 33)
- Plays: Right-handed (two-handed backhand)
- Prize money: $41,287

Singles
- Career record: 0–0 (at ATP Tour level, Grand Slam level, and in Davis Cup)
- Career titles: 0 ITF
- Highest ranking: No. 584 (17 December 2012)

Doubles
- Career record: 0–1 (at ATP Tour level, Grand Slam level, and in Davis Cup)
- Career titles: 2 ITF
- Highest ranking: No. 327 (6 May 2013)

Augusto Laranja (born 15 April 1992) is a Brazilian tennis player.

Laranja has a career high ATP singles ranking of No. 584 achieved on 17 December 2012 and a career high ATP doubles ranking of No. 327 achieved on 6 May 2013.

Laranja made his ATP main draw debut at the 2011 Brasil Open in the doubles draw partnering Fernando Romboli.

== Career titles ==
=== Doubles: 2 (2 ITF) ===
Legend
ATP Challenger Tour (0)
ITF Futures (2)

Date	Tournament	Tier	Surface	Partner	Opponents	Score
December 2012	Brazil F36, Porto Alegre	Futures	Clay	(Brazil) Caio Silva	(Brazil) Fabrício Neis (Brazil) Nicolas Santos	3–6, 6–4, [12–10]
April 2014	Brazil F3, Itajaí	Futures	Clay	(Argentina) Nicolás Kicker	(Brazil) Rogério Dutra Silva (Brazil) Caio Zampieri	3–6, 6–3, [14–12]
