= 2011 Dunlop World Challenge =

- Date: 21–27 November
- Edition: 4th
- Location: Toyota, Japan

Champions

Men's singles
- (Japan) Tatsuma Ito

Women's singles
- (Thailand) Tamarine Tanasugarn

Men's doubles
- (Japan) Hiroki Kondo / (Chinese Taipei) Yi Chu-huan

Women's doubles
- (Japan) Makoto Ninomiya / (Japan) Riko Sawayanagi
| ← 2010 · | Dunlop World Challenge | · 2012 → |

The 2011 Dunlop World Challenge was a professional tennis tournament played on carpet courts. It was the fourth edition of the tournament which was part of the 2011 ATP Challenger Tour and the 2011 ITF Women's Circuit. It took place in Toyota, Japan between 21 and 27 November 2011.

== ATP entrants ==
=== Seeds ===
| Country | Player | Rank^{1} | Seed |
|---|---|---|---|
| JPN | Go Soeda | 116 | 1 |
| JPN | Tatsuma Ito | 120 | 2 |
| JPN | Yūichi Sugita | 193 | 3 |
| THA | Danai Udomchoke | 211 | 4 |
| GER | Andre Begemann | 216 | 5 |
| MDA | Roman Borvanov | 221 | 6 |
| GER | Sebastian Rieschick | 262 | 7 |
| TPE | Jummy Wang | 287 | 8 |

- ^{1} Rankings are as of November 14, 2011.

=== Other entrants ===
The following players received wildcards into the singles main draw:

- (Japan) Takeshi Endo
- (Japan) Takuto Niki
- (Japan) Arata Onozawa
- (Japan) Shota Tagawa

The following players received entry from the qualifying draw:

- (China) Gao Wan
- (South Korea) Lee Jea-moon
- (Japan) Masatoshi Miyazaki
- (Chinese Taipei) Wang Chieh-fu

== WTA entrants ==
=== Seeds ===
| Country | Player | Rank^{1} | Seed |
|---|---|---|---|
| JPN | Kimiko Date-Krumm | 100 | 1 |
| JPN | Misaki Doi | 106 | 2 |
| NED | Michaëlla Krajicek | 107 | 3 |
| JPN | Erika Sema | 120 | 4 |
| THA | Tamarine Tanasugarn | 121 | 5 |
| TPE | Chan Yung-jan | 132 | 6 |
| JPN | Kurumi Nara | 143 | 7 |
| FRA | Caroline Garcia | 150 | 8 |

- ^{1} Rankings are as of November 14, 2011.

=== Other entrants ===
The following players received wildcards into the singles main draw:

- (Japan) Kanae Hisami
- (Russia) Ksenia Lykina
- (Japan) Makoto Ninomiya
- (Japan) Mari Tanaka

The following players received entry from the qualifying draw:

- (Chinese Taipei) Chan Chin-wei
- (Japan) Yuka Higuchi
- (Thailand) Nudnida Luangnam
- (Japan) Ayumi Oka

The following players received entry by a lucky loser spot:

- (Japan) Shuko Aoyama

== Champions ==
=== Men's singles ===
(Japan) Tatsuma Ito def. (Germany) Sebastian Rieschick, 6–4, 6–2

=== Women's singles ===
(Thailand) Tamarine Tanasugarn def. (Japan) Kimiko Date-Krumm, 6–2, 7–5

=== Men's doubles ===
(Japan) Hiroki Kondo / (Chinese Taipei) Yi Chu-huan vs. (China) Gao Peng / (China) Gao Wan, 6–4, 6–1

=== Women's doubles ===
(Japan) Makoto Ninomiya / (Japan) Riko Sawayanagi def. (France) Caroline Garcia / (Netherlands) Michaëlla Krajicek, Walkover
