= 2010 ITF Men's Circuit (October–December) =

The 2010 ITF Men's Circuit was the 2010 edition of the third-tier tour for men's professional tennis. It was organised by the International Tennis Federation and was a tier below the ATP Challenger Tour. During the months of October and December were played 91 tournaments with the majority being played in the month of October.

== Key ==
$15,000 tournaments
$10,000 tournaments

== October ==
Week of	Tournament	Winner	Runners-up	Semifinalists	Quarterfinalists
October 4	Australia F8 Futures; Port Pirie, Australia; Hard $15,000	(Australia) Colin Ebelthite; 3–6, 7–5, 6–3	(Australia) Nick Lindahl	(Australia) Matt Reid (Canada) Érik Chvojka	(Australia) Dane Propoggia (Australia) Adam Feeney (Australia) Dayne Kelly (Australia) Brydan Klein
October 4	Australia F8 Futures; Port Pirie, Australia; Hard $15,000	(Australia) Jared Easton (Australia) Joel Lindner; 6–4, 6–2	(Canada) Érik Chvojka (New Zealand) Mikal Statham	(Australia) Matt Reid (Canada) Érik Chvojka	(Australia) Dane Propoggia (Australia) Adam Feeney (Australia) Dayne Kelly (Australia) Brydan Klein
October 4	France F17 Futures; Nevers, France; Hard (indoor) $15,000+H	(France) Grégoire Burquier; 3–6, 6–4, 6–3	(France) Kenny de Schepper	(Lithuania) Laurynas Grigelis (Sweden) Carl Bergman	(France) Vincent Millot (France) Médy Chettar (France) Yannick Jankovits (France) Romain Jouan
October 4	France F17 Futures; Nevers, France; Hard (indoor) $15,000+H	(France) Grégoire Burquier (France) Simon Cauvard; 6–4, 6–3	(France) Dorian Descloix (France) Yannick Jankovits	(Lithuania) Laurynas Grigelis (Sweden) Carl Bergman	(France) Vincent Millot (France) Médy Chettar (France) Yannick Jankovits (France) Romain Jouan
October 4	Portugal F5 Futures; Espinho, Portugal; Clay $15,000	(Spain) Javier Martí; 6–4, 7–6^{(7–2)}	(Germany) Marc Sieber	(Australia) Jason Kubler (United Kingdom) Alexander Ward	(Germany) Sami Reinwein (Spain) Carlos Boluda-Purkiss (Portugal) Pedro Sousa (Germany) Marcel Zimmermann
October 4	Portugal F5 Futures; Espinho, Portugal; Clay $15,000	(Spain) Carlos Boluda-Purkiss (Spain) Pedro Rico García; 7–6^{(7–3)}, 6–4	(Australia) Allen Perel (Spain) Carles Poch Gradin	(Australia) Jason Kubler (United Kingdom) Alexander Ward	(Germany) Sami Reinwein (Spain) Carlos Boluda-Purkiss (Portugal) Pedro Sousa (Germany) Marcel Zimmermann
October 4	Spain F36 Futures; Córdoba, Spain; Hard $15,000	(Tunisia) Malek Jaziri; 6–4, 5–7, 6–4	(Spain) Pablo Carreño Busta	(Spain) Adrián Menéndez Maceiras (France) Ludovic Walter	(Spain) Agustin Bojé-Ordóñez (Israel) Amir Weintraub (Spain) Pablo Martín-Adalia (Portugal) João Sousa
October 4	Spain F36 Futures; Córdoba, Spain; Hard $15,000	(Portugal) João Sousa (Spain) Israel Vior-Díaz; 7–6^{(8–6)}, 4–6, [10–3]	(Spain) Iván Arenas-Gualda (Spain) Enrique López Pérez	(Spain) Adrián Menéndez Maceiras (France) Ludovic Walter	(Spain) Agustin Bojé-Ordóñez (Israel) Amir Weintraub (Spain) Pablo Martín-Adalia (Portugal) João Sousa
October 4	Bolivia F4 Futures; Santa Cruz, Bolivia; Clay $10,000	(Argentina) Renzo Olivo; 7–5, 7–6^{(7–3)}	(Argentina) Diego Sebastián Schwartzman	(Argentina) Juan Ignacio Londero (Bolivia) Ryusei Makiguchi	(Bolivia) Mauricio Doria-Medina (Argentina) Rodrigo Scattareggia (Bolivia) Federico Zeballos (Peru) Mauricio Echazú
October 4	Bolivia F4 Futures; Santa Cruz, Bolivia; Clay $10,000	(Bolivia) Hugo Dellien (Bolivia) Federico Zeballos; 6–1, 6–4	(Peru) Mauricio Echazú (Peru) Sergio Galdós	(Argentina) Juan Ignacio Londero (Bolivia) Ryusei Makiguchi	(Bolivia) Mauricio Doria-Medina (Argentina) Rodrigo Scattareggia (Bolivia) Federico Zeballos (Peru) Mauricio Echazú
October 4	Brazil F27 Futures; Salvador, Brazil; Hard $10,000	(Brazil) Daniel Dutra da Silva; 7–6^{(7–3)}, 3–6, 6–4	(Brazil) Fernando Romboli	(Brazil) Nicolas Santos (Brazil) Fabrício Neis	(Brazil) Augusto Laranja (Brazil) Thales Turini (Sweden) Christian Lindell (Brazil) Tiago Fernandes
October 4	Brazil F27 Futures; Salvador, Brazil; Hard $10,000	(Greece) Theodoros Angelinos (Brazil) Diego Matos; 6–3, 7–6^{(7–5)}	(Brazil) Fabrício Neis (Brazil) Fernando Romboli	(Brazil) Nicolas Santos (Brazil) Fabrício Neis	(Brazil) Augusto Laranja (Brazil) Thales Turini (Sweden) Christian Lindell (Brazil) Tiago Fernandes
October 4	Germany F17 Futures; Leimen, Germany; Hard (indoor) $10,000	(Finland) Timo Nieminen; 6–3, 7–5	(Germany) Holger Fischer	(Netherlands) Antal van der Duim (Germany) Yannick Hanfmann	(Germany) Patrick Taubert (Slovakia) Michal Pažický (Belgium) Maxime Authom (Poland) Marcin Gawron
October 4	Germany F17 Futures; Leimen, Germany; Hard (indoor) $10,000	(Finland) Timo Nieminen (Czech Republic) Michal Schmid; 6–3, 7–5	(Germany) Kevin Deden (Germany) Holger Fischer	(Netherlands) Antal van der Duim (Germany) Yannick Hanfmann	(Germany) Patrick Taubert (Slovakia) Michal Pažický (Belgium) Maxime Authom (Poland) Marcin Gawron
October 4	Iran F5 Futures; Tehran, Iran; Clay $10,000	(Russia) Aleksandr Lobkov; 6–3, 6–4	(Austria) Björn Propst	(Russia) Stanislav Vovk (Ukraine) Ivan Anikanov	(Greece) Manolis Glezos (Germany) Sebastian Fitz (Iran) Anoosha Shahgholi (India) Ranjeet Virali-Murugesan
October 4	Iran F5 Futures; Tehran, Iran; Clay $10,000	(Indonesia) Elbert Sie (India) Ranjeet Virali-Murugesan; 6–3, 6–2	(Austria) Christoph Lessiak (Austria) Björn Propst	(Russia) Stanislav Vovk (Ukraine) Ivan Anikanov	(Greece) Manolis Glezos (Germany) Sebastian Fitz (Iran) Anoosha Shahgholi (India) Ranjeet Virali-Murugesan
October 4	Italy F29 Futures; Naples, Italy; Hard $10,000	(Italy) Claudio Grassi; 6–0, 7–6^{(7–4)}	(Italy) Federico Torresi	(Italy) Andrea Falgheri (Italy) Riccardo Sinicropi	(Greece) Alexandros Jakupovic (Italy) Filippo Leonardi (Republic of Ireland) Sam Barry (Italy) Viktor Galović
October 4	Italy F29 Futures; Naples, Italy; Hard $10,000	(Italy) Erik Crepaldi (Italy) Claudio Grassi; 6–4, 6–4	(Italy) Alessandro Bega (Italy) Riccardo Sinicropi	(Italy) Andrea Falgheri (Italy) Riccardo Sinicropi	(Greece) Alexandros Jakupovic (Italy) Filippo Leonardi (Republic of Ireland) Sam Barry (Italy) Viktor Galović
October 4	Kazakhstan F4 Futures; Astana, Kazakhstan; Hard (indoor) $10,000	(Russia) Mikhail Elgin; 6–4, 7–6^{(7–1)}	(Belgium) Julien Dubail	(Montenegro) Daniel Danilović (France) Antoine Tassart	(Russia) Richard Muzaev (Russia) Sergei Krotiouk (Netherlands) Jannick Lupescu (Ukraine) Aleksandr Agafonov
October 4	Kazakhstan F4 Futures; Astana, Kazakhstan; Hard (indoor) $10,000	(Russia) Mikhail Elgin (Belarus) Andrei Vasilevski; 5–7, 6–4, [10–4]	(Belarus) Siarhei Betau (Kazakhstan) Alexey Kedryuk	(Montenegro) Daniel Danilović (France) Antoine Tassart	(Russia) Richard Muzaev (Russia) Sergei Krotiouk (Netherlands) Jannick Lupescu (Ukraine) Aleksandr Agafonov
October 4	Turkey F10 Futures; Antalya, Turkey; Hard $10,000	(Australia) Samuel Groth; 6–4, 6–2	(Ukraine) Artem Smirnov	(Finland) Juho Paukku (Moldova) Radu Albot	(Poland) Rafał Gozdur (Ukraine) Gleb Alekseenko (Slovakia) Norbert Gombos (Denmark) Philip Orno
October 4	Turkey F10 Futures; Antalya, Turkey; Hard $10,000	(Ukraine) Artem Smirnov (Hungary) Róbert Varga; 6–4, 6–4	(Bosnia and Herzegovina) Tomislav Brkić (Serbia) Nikola Ćaćić	(Finland) Juho Paukku (Moldova) Radu Albot	(Poland) Rafał Gozdur (Ukraine) Gleb Alekseenko (Slovakia) Norbert Gombos (Denmark) Philip Orno
October 11	Australia F9 Futures; Happy Valley, Australia; Hard $15,000	(Australia) Nick Lindahl; 7–6^{(7–5)}, 6–3	(Australia) Brydan Klein	(Australia) Matt Reid (Canada) Érik Chvojka	(Australia) Adam Feeney (Australia) Isaac Frost (Australia) Matthew Barton (Australia) Michael Look
October 11	Australia F9 Futures; Happy Valley, Australia; Hard $15,000	(Australia) Colin Ebelthite (Australia) Adam Feeney; 7–5, 6–2	(Australia) Chris Letcher (Australia) Brendan Moore	(Australia) Matt Reid (Canada) Érik Chvojka	(Australia) Adam Feeney (Australia) Isaac Frost (Australia) Matthew Barton (Australia) Michael Look
October 11	Belarus F3 Futures; Minsk, Belarus; Hard (indoor) $15,000	(Poland) Jerzy Janowicz; 7–6^{(8–6)}, 6–3	(Belarus) Aliaksandr Bury	(Belarus) Siarhei Betau (Estonia) Jürgen Zopp	(Russia) Victor Baluda (Poland) Marcin Gawron (Belarus) Denis Matsukevich (Australia) Samuel Groth
October 11	Belarus F3 Futures; Minsk, Belarus; Hard (indoor) $15,000	(Belarus) Siarhei Betau (Belarus) Dzmitry Zhyrmont; 7–6^{(7–2)}, 3–6, [10–7]	(Belarus) Aliaksandr Bury (Belarus) Nikolai Fidirko	(Belarus) Siarhei Betau (Estonia) Jürgen Zopp	(Russia) Victor Baluda (Poland) Marcin Gawron (Belarus) Denis Matsukevich (Australia) Samuel Groth
October 11	France F18 Futures; Saint-Dizier, France; Hard (indoor) $15,000	(Belgium) David Goffin; 6–4, 7–5	(Switzerland) Adrien Bossel	(France) Ludovic Walter (Belgium) Yannick Mertens	(France) Mathieu Rodrigues (France) Kevin Botti (France) Jonathan Eysseric (France) Grégoire Burquier
October 11	France F18 Futures; Saint-Dizier, France; Hard (indoor) $15,000	(France) Julien Maes (France) Fabrice Martin; 2–6, 6–4, [10–4]	(France) Kenny de Schepper (France) Albano Olivetti	(France) Ludovic Walter (Belgium) Yannick Mertens	(France) Mathieu Rodrigues (France) Kevin Botti (France) Jonathan Eysseric (France) Grégoire Burquier
October 11	Japan F9 Futures; Kashiwa, Japan; Hard $15,000	(Thailand) Danai Udomchoke; 6–4, 6–2	(Chinese Taipei) Chen Ti	(Japan) Yasutaka Uchiyama (Japan) Toshihide Matsui	(Japan) Hiroyasu Ehara (Japan) Hiroki Moriya (Japan) Yuichi Ito (South Korea) Lee Jea-moon
October 11	Japan F9 Futures; Kashiwa, Japan; Hard $15,000	(Japan) Yuichi Ito (Chinese Taipei) Yi Chu-huan; 4–6, 6–1, [10–8]	(Finland) Harri Heliövaara (Japan) Bumpei Sato	(Japan) Yasutaka Uchiyama (Japan) Toshihide Matsui	(Japan) Hiroyasu Ehara (Japan) Hiroki Moriya (Japan) Yuichi Ito (South Korea) Lee Jea-moon
October 11	Kuwait F1 Futures; Meshref, Kuwait; Hard $15,000	(Germany) Sebastian Rieschick; 6–3, 6–7^{(5–7)}, 6–0	(Italy) Riccardo Ghedin	(United Kingdom) James Ward (Russia) Mikhail Vasiliev	(Kuwait) Ahmad Rabeea Muhammad (Croatia) Roko Karanušić (Switzerland) Luca Margaroli (Italy) Erik Crepaldi
October 11	Kuwait F1 Futures; Meshref, Kuwait; Hard $15,000	(Croatia) Roko Karanušić (Germany) Sebastian Rieschick; 6–1, 6–4	(Switzerland) Luca Margaroli (Russia) Mikhail Vasiliev	(United Kingdom) James Ward (Russia) Mikhail Vasiliev	(Kuwait) Ahmad Rabeea Muhammad (Croatia) Roko Karanušić (Switzerland) Luca Margaroli (Italy) Erik Crepaldi
October 11	USA F26 Futures; Austin, United States; Hard $15,000	(United States) Denis Kudla; 7–5, 6–1	(United States) Tyler Hochwalt	(United States) Jordan Cox (South Africa) Fritz Wolmarans	(Italy) Andrea Stoppini (United States) Jack Sock (Moldova) Roman Borvanov (South Africa) Jean Andersen
October 11	USA F26 Futures; Austin, United States; Hard $15,000	(South Africa) Chris Haggard (United States) Conor Pollock; 6–3, 6–2	(South Africa) Jean Andersen (United States) Joshua Zavala	(United States) Jordan Cox (South Africa) Fritz Wolmarans	(Italy) Andrea Stoppini (United States) Jack Sock (Moldova) Roman Borvanov (South Africa) Jean Andersen
October 11	Brazil F28 Futures; Fernandópolis, Brazil; Clay $10,000	(Sweden) Christian Lindell; 7–6^{(8–6)}, 6–2	(Brazil) André Miele	(Brazil) Tiago Fernandes (Greece) Theodoros Angelinos	(Italy) Giorgio Portaluri (Brazil) Carlos Oliveira (Argentina) Cristhian Ignacio Benedetti (Brazil) Nicolas Santos
October 11	Brazil F28 Futures; Fernandópolis, Brazil; Clay $10,000	(Sweden) Christian Lindell (Brazil) Fabrício Neis; Walkover	(Brazil) Tiago Fernandes (Brazil) Bruno Semenzato	(Brazil) Tiago Fernandes (Greece) Theodoros Angelinos	(Italy) Giorgio Portaluri (Brazil) Carlos Oliveira (Argentina) Cristhian Ignacio Benedetti (Brazil) Nicolas Santos
October 11	Germany F18 Futures; Isernhagen, Germany; Hard (indoor) $10,000	(Latvia) Kārlis Lejnieks; 4–6, 6–4, 6–3	(Germany) Peter Torebko	(Germany) Stefan Seifert (Germany) Jan-Lennard Struff	(Germany) Kevin Deden (Czech Republic) Jan Mertl (Brazil) André Ghem (Finland) Timo Nieminen
October 11	Germany F18 Futures; Isernhagen, Germany; Hard (indoor) $10,000	(Germany) Nicolas Kiefer (Germany) Stefan Seifert; 3–6, 6–2, [10–7]	(Czech Republic) Roman Jebavý (Czech Republic) Daniel Lustig	(Germany) Stefan Seifert (Germany) Jan-Lennard Struff	(Germany) Kevin Deden (Czech Republic) Jan Mertl (Brazil) André Ghem (Finland) Timo Nieminen
October 11	Greece F1 Futures; Kos, Greece; Hard $10,000	(Finland) Juho Paukku; 6–3, 6–2	(Latvia) Adrians Žguns	(United Kingdom) Marcus Willis (Serbia) Arsenije Zlatanović	(Italy) Claudio Grassi (Greece) Alexandros Jakupovic (Republic of Ireland) James McGee (United Kingdom) Sean Thornley
October 11	Greece F1 Futures; Kos, Greece; Hard $10,000	(Italy) Andrea Falgheri (Italy) Claudio Grassi; 6–1, 6–3	(Greece) Paris Gemouchidis (Greece) Alexandros Jakupovic	(United Kingdom) Marcus Willis (Serbia) Arsenije Zlatanović	(Italy) Claudio Grassi (Greece) Alexandros Jakupovic (Republic of Ireland) James McGee (United Kingdom) Sean Thornley
October 11	Italy F30 Futures; Reggio Calabria, Italy; Clay $10,000	(Italy) Alessio di Mauro; 7–6^{(7–4)}, 6–4	(Italy) Luca Vanni	(Italy) Andrea Arnaboldi (Romania) Marius Copil	(Italy) Walter Trusendi (Italy) Alberto Brizzi (Italy) Gianluca Naso (Italy) Marco Crugnola
October 11	Italy F30 Futures; Reggio Calabria, Italy; Clay $10,000	(Italy) Andrea Arnaboldi (Italy) Gianluca Naso; 6–4, 6–4	(Romania) Marius Copil (Italy) Giuseppe Faraone	(Italy) Andrea Arnaboldi (Romania) Marius Copil	(Italy) Walter Trusendi (Italy) Alberto Brizzi (Italy) Gianluca Naso (Italy) Marco Crugnola
October 11	Kazakhstan F5 Futures; Almaty, Kazakhstan; Hard (indoor) $10,000	(Belgium) Julien Dubail; 6–4, 6–1	(Russia) Danila Arsenov	(Kazakhstan) Dmitriy Makeyev (Netherlands) Jannick Lupescu	(South Korea) Choi Jae-won (Russia) Vitali Reshetnikov (Kazakhstan) Alexey Kedryuk (Kazakhstan) Denis Yevseyev
October 11	Kazakhstan F5 Futures; Almaty, Kazakhstan; Hard (indoor) $10,000	(Kazakhstan) Alexey Kedryuk (Russia) Sergei Krotiouk; 6–4, 6–4	(Russia) Vladislav Dubinsky (Kazakhstan) Serizhan Yessenbekov	(Kazakhstan) Dmitriy Makeyev (Netherlands) Jannick Lupescu	(South Korea) Choi Jae-won (Russia) Vitali Reshetnikov (Kazakhstan) Alexey Kedryuk (Kazakhstan) Denis Yevseyev
October 11	Turkey F11 Futures; Antalya, Turkey; Hard $10,000	(Moldova) Radu Albot; 6–3, 4–6, 7–5	(Ukraine) Denys Molchanov	(Belgium) Germain Gigounon (Slovakia) Norbert Gombos	(Sweden) Patrik Brydolf (Turkey) Haluk Akkoyun (Slovakia) Kamil Čapkovič (Belgium) Gaëtan De Lovinfosse
October 11	Turkey F11 Futures; Antalya, Turkey; Hard $10,000	(Slovakia) Kamil Čapkovič (Ukraine) Denys Molchanov; 6–4, 7–6^{(7–1)}	(Turkey) Barış Ergüden (Denmark) Philip Orno	(Belgium) Germain Gigounon (Slovakia) Norbert Gombos	(Sweden) Patrik Brydolf (Turkey) Haluk Akkoyun (Slovakia) Kamil Čapkovič (Belgium) Gaëtan De Lovinfosse
October 11	Venezuela F4 Futures; Caracas, Venezuela; Hard $10,000	(United States) Greg Ouellette; 6–3, 6–1	(Ecuador) Iván Endara	(Venezuela) David Souto (Venezuela) Piero Luisi	(Venezuela) Román Recarte (South Africa) Damon Gooch (Trinidad and Tobago) Joseph Cadogan (France) Gilles de Sousa
October 11	Venezuela F4 Futures; Caracas, Venezuela; Hard $10,000	(United States) Greg Ouellette (United States) Maciek Sykut; 6–2, 6–4	(Spain) Ramón González (Brazil) Alexandre Schnitman	(Venezuela) David Souto (Venezuela) Piero Luisi	(Venezuela) Román Recarte (South Africa) Damon Gooch (Trinidad and Tobago) Joseph Cadogan (France) Gilles de Sousa
October 18	Belarus F4 Futures; Minsk, Belarus; Hard (indoor) $15,000	(Belarus) Siarhei Betau; 4–6, 7–6^{(8–6)}, 7–6^{(7–3)}	(Poland) Jerzy Janowicz	(Belarus) Aliaksandr Bury (Australia) Samuel Groth	(Sweden) Stefan Borg (Poland) Marcin Gawron (Russia) Victor Baluda (Poland) Robert Godlewski
October 18	Belarus F4 Futures; Minsk, Belarus; Hard (indoor) $15,000	(Belarus) Siarhei Betau (Belarus) Dzmitry Zhyrmont; 6–3, 6–3	(Russia) Vitali Reshetnikov (Belarus) Andrei Vasilevski	(Belarus) Aliaksandr Bury (Australia) Samuel Groth	(Sweden) Stefan Borg (Poland) Marcin Gawron (Russia) Victor Baluda (Poland) Robert Godlewski
October 18	Croatia F7 Futures; Dubrovnik, Croatia; Clay $15,000	(Hungary) Attila Balázs; 6–2, 7–5	(Germany) Marcel Zimmermann	(Serbia) Boris Pašanski (Italy) Andrea Arnaboldi	(France) Antony Dupuis (Austria) Michael Linzer (Spain) Javier Martí (Germany) Alexander Flock
October 18	Croatia F7 Futures; Dubrovnik, Croatia; Clay $15,000	(Italy) Andrea Arnaboldi (United Kingdom) Morgan Phillips; 6–4, 6–4	(Italy) Alessandro Giannessi (Austria) Bertram Steinberger	(Serbia) Boris Pašanski (Italy) Andrea Arnaboldi	(France) Antony Dupuis (Austria) Michael Linzer (Spain) Javier Martí (Germany) Alexander Flock
October 18	Egypt F4 Futures; Cairo, Egypt; Clay $15,000	(Russia) Aleksandr Lobkov; 6–4, 6–2	(Spain) Gerard Granollers	(Tunisia) Malek Jaziri (Serbia) Miljan Zekić	(France) Jonathan Dasnières de Veigy (Morocco) Mehdi Ziadi (Egypt) Sherif Sabry (Austria) Nicolas Reissig
October 18	Egypt F4 Futures; Cairo, Egypt; Clay $15,000	(Serbia) Dušan Lajović (Serbia) Miljan Zekić; 7–6^{(7–5)}, 7–6^{(10–8)}	(Russia) Aleksandr Lobkov (Russia) Alexander Rumyantsev	(Tunisia) Malek Jaziri (Serbia) Miljan Zekić	(France) Jonathan Dasnières de Veigy (Morocco) Mehdi Ziadi (Egypt) Sherif Sabry (Austria) Nicolas Reissig
October 18	France F19 Futures; La Roche-sur-Yon, France; Hard (indoor) $15,000+H	(France) Clément Reix; 6–3, 6–7^{(7–9)}, 7–6^{(10–8)}	(Belgium) Yannick Mertens	(France) Rudy Coco (France) Baptiste Dupuy	(France) Gleb Sakharov (France) Ludovic Walter (France) Jérémy Blandin (France) Fabrice Martin
October 18	France F19 Futures; La Roche-sur-Yon, France; Hard (indoor) $15,000+H	(France) Jérémy Blandin (France) Alexandre Renard; 6–3, 6–4	(France) Charles-Antoine Brézac (France) Vincent Stouff	(France) Rudy Coco (France) Baptiste Dupuy	(France) Gleb Sakharov (France) Ludovic Walter (France) Jérémy Blandin (France) Fabrice Martin
October 18	Great Britain F16 Futures; Glasgow, Great Britain; Hard (indoor) $15,000	(Australia) Matthew Ebden; 6–2, 3–6, 6–3	(United Kingdom) Daniel Evans	(Netherlands) Matwé Middelkoop (Italy) Matteo Viola	(Slovakia) Miloslav Mečíř Jr. (Finland) Timo Nieminen (United Kingdom) Joshua Milton (Italy) Thomas Fabbiano
October 18	Great Britain F16 Futures; Glasgow, Great Britain; Hard (indoor) $15,000	(United Kingdom) Lewis Burton (United Kingdom) Daniel Evans; 7–6^{(7–1)}, 3–6, [10–6]	(Australia) Matthew Ebden (United Kingdom) Joshua Milton	(Netherlands) Matwé Middelkoop (Italy) Matteo Viola	(Slovakia) Miloslav Mečíř Jr. (Finland) Timo Nieminen (United Kingdom) Joshua Milton (Italy) Thomas Fabbiano
October 18	Japan F10 Futures; Nishi-Tama, Japan; Hard $15,000	(Thailand) Danai Udomchoke; 6–1, 6–7^{(6–8)}, 6–4	(Japan) Shuichi Sekiguchi	(Chinese Taipei) Chen Ti (Japan) Hiroki Moriya	(Finland) Harri Heliövaara (Japan) Yuichi Ito (Japan) Sho Katayama (Japan) Toshihide Matsui
October 18	Japan F10 Futures; Nishi-Tama, Japan; Hard $15,000	(Japan) Tasuku Iwami (Japan) Hiroki Kondo; 6–2, 6–4	(Finland) Harri Heliövaara (Japan) Bumpei Sato	(Chinese Taipei) Chen Ti (Japan) Hiroki Moriya	(Finland) Harri Heliövaara (Japan) Yuichi Ito (Japan) Sho Katayama (Japan) Toshihide Matsui
October 18	Kuwait F2 Futures; Meshref, Kuwait; Hard $15,000	(Slovakia) Martin Kližan; 6–1, 6–1	(Russia) Mikhail Vasiliev	(Germany) Sebastian Rieschick (Italy) Riccardo Ghedin	(United Arab Emirates) Omar Alawadhi (Italy) Erik Crepaldi (Egypt) Mohamed Safwat (Croatia) Roko Karanušić
October 18	Kuwait F2 Futures; Meshref, Kuwait; Hard $15,000	(Croatia) Roko Karanušić (Germany) Sebastian Rieschick; 6–2, 6–2	(Oman) Mohammed Al-Nabhani (United Arab Emirates) Omar Alawadhi	(Germany) Sebastian Rieschick (Italy) Riccardo Ghedin	(United Arab Emirates) Omar Alawadhi (Italy) Erik Crepaldi (Egypt) Mohamed Safwat (Croatia) Roko Karanušić
October 18	Nigeria F1 Futures Futures; Lagos, Nigeria; Hard $15,000+H	(Israel) Amir Weintraub; 2–6, 6–4, 7–5	(India) Karan Rastogi	(Belgium) Niels Desein (South Africa) Raven Klaasen	(India) Ranjeet Virali-Murugesan (Netherlands) Boy Westerhof (Israel) Tal Eros (France) Laurent Rochette
October 18	Nigeria F1 Futures Futures; Lagos, Nigeria; Hard $15,000+H	(Israel) Amir Weintraub (Netherlands) Boy Westerhof; Walkover	(Belgium) Niels Desein (France) Laurent Rochette	(Belgium) Niels Desein (South Africa) Raven Klaasen	(India) Ranjeet Virali-Murugesan (Netherlands) Boy Westerhof (Israel) Tal Eros (France) Laurent Rochette
October 18	Spain F37 Futures; Sabadell, Spain; Clay $15,000	(Spain) Sergio Gutiérrez Ferrol; 1–6, 6–4, 6–2	(Spain) Guillermo Olaso	(Australia) Jason Kubler (Spain) Pablo Santos	(Spain) Marc Fornell (Spain) Andoni Vivanco-Guzmán (Spain) Miguel Ángel López Jaén (Spain) José Checa Calvo
October 18	Spain F37 Futures; Sabadell, Spain; Clay $15,000	(Spain) Miguel Ángel López Jaén (Spain) Pablo Santos; 7–6^{(7–4)}, 7–5	(Spain) Sergio Gutiérrez Ferrol (Spain) Rafael Mazón-Hernández	(Australia) Jason Kubler (Spain) Pablo Santos	(Spain) Marc Fornell (Spain) Andoni Vivanco-Guzmán (Spain) Miguel Ángel López Jaén (Spain) José Checa Calvo
October 18	USA F27 Futures; Mansfield, United States; Hard $15,000	(South Africa) Fritz Wolmarans; 6–1, 6–2	(United States) Jordan Cox	(United Kingdom) Chris Eaton (Bulgaria) Dimitar Kutrovsky	(United States) Andrea Collarini (India) Karunuday Singh (Moldova) Roman Borvanov (Italy) Andrea Stoppini
October 18	USA F27 Futures; Mansfield, United States; Hard $15,000	(Bulgaria) Dimitar Kutrovsky (United States) Joshua Zavala; 6–3, 6–2	(United States) Andrea Collarini (United States) Denis Kudla	(United Kingdom) Chris Eaton (Bulgaria) Dimitar Kutrovsky	(United States) Andrea Collarini (India) Karunuday Singh (Moldova) Roman Borvanov (Italy) Andrea Stoppini
October 18	Argentina F20 Futures; La Rioja, Argentina; Clay $10,000	(Argentina) Jonathan Gonzalia; 6–4, 6–4	(Argentina) Nicolás Pastor	(Argentina) Agustín Picco (Argentina) Patricio Heras	(Argentina) Facundo Argüello (Italy) Stefano Travaglia (Argentina) Gabriel Blanco (Argentina) Juan-Manuel Valverde
October 18	Argentina F20 Futures; La Rioja, Argentina; Clay $10,000	(Argentina) Patricio Heras (Argentina) Agustín Picco; 6–2, 6–3	(Argentina) Guillermo Bujniewicz (Argentina) Renzo Olivo	(Argentina) Agustín Picco (Argentina) Patricio Heras	(Argentina) Facundo Argüello (Italy) Stefano Travaglia (Argentina) Gabriel Blanco (Argentina) Juan-Manuel Valverde
October 18	Brazil F29 Futures; São Leopoldo, Brazil; Clay $10,000+H	(Brazil) Rafael Camilo; 6–4, 6–1	(Slovakia) Ivo Klec	(Argentina) Juan-Pablo Villar (Brazil) Fernando Romboli	(Brazil) Thales Turini (Brazil) Daniel Dutra da Silva (Argentina) Cristhian Ignacio Benedetti (Brazil) Yuri Radomsky
October 18	Brazil F29 Futures; São Leopoldo, Brazil; Clay $10,000+H	(Brazil) Fernando Romboli (Brazil) Nicolas Santos; 6–4, 6–2	(Brazil) Fabrício Neis (Brazil) José Pereira	(Argentina) Juan-Pablo Villar (Brazil) Fernando Romboli	(Brazil) Thales Turini (Brazil) Daniel Dutra da Silva (Argentina) Cristhian Ignacio Benedetti (Brazil) Yuri Radomsky
October 18	Chile F1 Futures; Santiago, Chile; Clay $10,000	(Chile) Guillermo Rivera Aránguiz; 6–2, 4–6, 7–5	(Peru) Mauricio Echazú	(Chile) Guillermo Hormazábal (Chile) Cristóbal Saavedra Corvalán	(Argentina) Gastón Giussani (Portugal) Gonçalo Pereira (Argentina) Gastón-Arturo Grimolizzi (Colombia) Nicolás Barrientos
October 18	Chile F1 Futures; Santiago, Chile; Clay $10,000	(Chile) Guillermo Hormazábal (Chile) Rodrigo Pérez; 6–4, 6–4	(Chile) Max Gaedechens (Chile) Jorge Montero	(Chile) Guillermo Hormazábal (Chile) Cristóbal Saavedra Corvalán	(Argentina) Gastón Giussani (Portugal) Gonçalo Pereira (Argentina) Gastón-Arturo Grimolizzi (Colombia) Nicolás Barrientos
October 18	Greece F2 Futures; Paros, Greece; Carpet $10,000	(Hungary) Ádám Kellner; 3–2 retired	(Hungary) Kornél Bardóczky	(Germany) Nils Langer (Italy) Claudio Grassi	(Switzerland) Alexander Sadecky (United Kingdom) Sean Thornley (Italy) Andrea Falgheri (Republic of Ireland) James McGee
October 18	Greece F2 Futures; Paros, Greece; Carpet $10,000	(Hungary) Kornél Bardóczky (Hungary) Ádám Kellner; 6–2, 6–4	(Greece) Konstantinos Economidis (Greece) Alexandros Jakupovic	(Germany) Nils Langer (Italy) Claudio Grassi	(Switzerland) Alexander Sadecky (United Kingdom) Sean Thornley (Italy) Andrea Falgheri (Republic of Ireland) James McGee
October 18	Paraguay F1 Futures; Lambaré, Paraguay; Clay $10,000	(Argentina) Juan-Pablo Amado; 3–6, 6–1, 6–4	(Italy) Matteo Marrai	(Paraguay) Diego Galeano (Argentina) Joaquín-Jesús Monteferrario	(Paraguay) Gustavo Ramírez (Argentina) Agustín Velotti (Ecuador) Diego Acosta (Argentina) Alejandro Kon
October 18	Paraguay F1 Futures; Lambaré, Paraguay; Clay $10,000	(Paraguay) Diego Galeano (Paraguay) Daniel Alejandro López; 7–6^{(7–5)}, 6–2	(Italy) Matteo Marrai (Italy) Marco Simoni	(Paraguay) Diego Galeano (Argentina) Joaquín-Jesús Monteferrario	(Paraguay) Gustavo Ramírez (Argentina) Agustín Velotti (Ecuador) Diego Acosta (Argentina) Alejandro Kon
October 18	Turkey F12 Futures; Adana, Turkey; Hard $10,000	(Romania) Adrian Cruciat; 6–2, 6–1	(Turkey) Haluk Akkoyun	(United Kingdom) Alexander Ward (Romania) Teodor-Dacian Crăciun	(Belgium) Yannik Reuter (Sweden) Patrik Brydolf (Belgium) Alexandre Folie (Slovakia) Kamil Čapkovič
October 18	Turkey F12 Futures; Adana, Turkey; Hard $10,000	(Romania) Teodor-Dacian Crăciun (Romania) Adrian Cruciat; 7–5, 6–4	(Russia) Vitaly Kachanovskiy (Russia) Andemir Karanashev	(United Kingdom) Alexander Ward (Romania) Teodor-Dacian Crăciun	(Belgium) Yannik Reuter (Sweden) Patrik Brydolf (Belgium) Alexandre Folie (Slovakia) Kamil Čapkovič
October 18	Venezuela F5 Futures; Caracas, Venezuela; Hard $10,000	(Colombia) Alejandro González; 6–1, 7–6^{(7–3)}	(United States) Greg Ouellette	(Ecuador) Iván Endara (Mexico) Manuel Sánchez	(Venezuela) Piero Luisi (United States) Maciek Sykut (France) Jean-Noel Insausti (Venezuela) David Souto
October 18	Venezuela F5 Futures; Caracas, Venezuela; Hard $10,000	(United States) Peter Aarts (South Africa) Damon Gooch; 7–6^{(7–5)}, 4–6, [10–4]	(New Zealand) Marvin Barker (Australia) Matheson Klein	(Ecuador) Iván Endara (Mexico) Manuel Sánchez	(Venezuela) Piero Luisi (United States) Maciek Sykut (France) Jean-Noel Insausti (Venezuela) David Souto
October 25	Croatia F8 Futures; Dubrovnik, Croatia; Clay $15,000	(Croatia) Kristijan Mesaroš; 6–2, 6–4	(Croatia) Dino Marcan	(Bosnia and Herzegovina) Mirza Bašić (Germany) Alexander Flock	(Italy) Alessandro Giannessi (Serbia) Ivan Bjelica (Serbia) Boris Pašanski (Serbia) David Savić
October 25	Croatia F8 Futures; Dubrovnik, Croatia; Clay $15,000	(Bosnia and Herzegovina) Tomislav Brkić (Bosnia and Herzegovina) Damir Džumhur; 2–6, 6–1, [11–9]	(Croatia) Kristijan Mesaroš (Croatia) Marin Milan	(Bosnia and Herzegovina) Mirza Bašić (Germany) Alexander Flock	(Italy) Alessandro Giannessi (Serbia) Ivan Bjelica (Serbia) Boris Pašanski (Serbia) David Savić
October 25	Egypt F5 Futures; Cairo, Egypt; Clay $15,000	(Serbia) Miljan Zekić; 6–1, 3–6, 6–4	(Serbia) Dušan Lajović	(France) Jonathan Dasnières de Veigy (Czech Republic) Ľubomír Majšajdr	(Switzerland) Raphael Lustenberger (Tunisia) Malek Jaziri (Egypt) Karim Maamoun (Russia) Aleksandr Lobkov
October 25	Egypt F5 Futures; Cairo, Egypt; Clay $15,000	(Russia) Aleksandr Lobkov (Russia) Alexander Rumyantsev; 4–6, 7–5, [10–5]	(Czech Republic) Ľubomír Majšajdr (Czech Republic) Roman Vögeli	(France) Jonathan Dasnières de Veigy (Czech Republic) Ľubomír Majšajdr	(Switzerland) Raphael Lustenberger (Tunisia) Malek Jaziri (Egypt) Karim Maamoun (Russia) Aleksandr Lobkov
October 25	Great Britain F17 Futures; Cardiff, Great Britain; Hard (indoor) $15,000	(Estonia) Jürgen Zopp; 6–4, 7–5	(United Kingdom) Daniel Evans	(Netherlands) Matwé Middelkoop (Italy) Thomas Fabbiano	(United Kingdom) Jamie Baker (Italy) Riccardo Ghedin (Finland) Timo Nieminen (Finland) Henri Kontinen
October 25	Great Britain F17 Futures; Cardiff, Great Britain; Hard (indoor) $15,000	(United Kingdom) Josh Goodall (United Kingdom) Dominic Inglot; 6–1, 6–2	(Finland) Henri Kontinen (Finland) Timo Nieminen	(Netherlands) Matwé Middelkoop (Italy) Thomas Fabbiano	(United Kingdom) Jamie Baker (Italy) Riccardo Ghedin (Finland) Timo Nieminen (Finland) Henri Kontinen
October 25	Nigeria F2 Futures Futures; Lagos, Nigeria; Hard $15,000+H	(India) Karan Rastogi; 6–2, 6–7^{(4–7)}, 7–5	(South Africa) Raven Klaasen	(Netherlands) Boy Westerhof (Israel) Gilad Ben Zvi	(Ivory Coast) Terence Nugent (India) Ranjeet Virali-Murugesan (Ivory Coast) Valentin Sanon (France) Laurent Rochette
October 25	Nigeria F2 Futures Futures; Lagos, Nigeria; Hard $15,000+H	(Israel) Amir Weintraub (Netherlands) Boy Westerhof; 5–7, 6–4, [10–6]	(South Africa) Raven Klaasen (South Africa) Ruan Roelofse	(Netherlands) Boy Westerhof (Israel) Gilad Ben Zvi	(Ivory Coast) Terence Nugent (India) Ranjeet Virali-Murugesan (Ivory Coast) Valentin Sanon (France) Laurent Rochette
October 25	Argentina F21 Futures; San Juan, Argentina; Clay $10,000	(Argentina) Facundo Argüello; 6–1, 6–1	(Argentina) Diego Sebastián Schwartzman	(Argentina) Gabriel Alejandro Hidalgo (Argentina) Guillermo Carry	(Argentina) Patricio Heras (Argentina) Juan-Manuel Valverde (Argentina) Rodrigo Scattareggia (Argentina) Jonathan Gonzalia
October 25	Argentina F21 Futures; San Juan, Argentina; Clay $10,000	(Argentina) Guillermo Carry (Argentina) Diego Sebastián Schwartzman; Walkover	(Argentina) Andrés Ceppo (Argentina) Rodrigo Scattareggia	(Argentina) Gabriel Alejandro Hidalgo (Argentina) Guillermo Carry	(Argentina) Patricio Heras (Argentina) Juan-Manuel Valverde (Argentina) Rodrigo Scattareggia (Argentina) Jonathan Gonzalia
October 25	Brazil F30 Futures; Porto Alegre, Brazil; Clay $10,000	(Brazil) Daniel Dutra da Silva; 7–6^{(7–5)}, 5–7, 6–2	(Brazil) Rodrigo Guidolin	(Argentina) Cristhian Ignacio Benedetti (Brazil) Fernando Romboli	(Argentina) Juan-Pablo Villar (Brazil) André Miele (Brazil) José Pereira (Brazil) Guilherme Clezar
October 25	Brazil F30 Futures; Porto Alegre, Brazil; Clay $10,000	(Italy) Giorgio Portaluri (Argentina) Juan-Pablo Villar; 6–3, 7–5	(Brazil) Fernando Romboli (Brazil) Nicolas Santos	(Argentina) Cristhian Ignacio Benedetti (Brazil) Fernando Romboli	(Argentina) Juan-Pablo Villar (Brazil) André Miele (Brazil) José Pereira (Brazil) Guilherme Clezar
October 25	Chile F2 Futures; Santiago, Chile; Clay $10,000	(Chile) Guillermo Hormazábal; 7–5, 6–2	(Chile) Guillermo Rivera Aránguiz	(Peru) Sergio Galdós (Montenegro) Goran Tošić	(Serbia) Nikola Ćirić (Chile) Jorge Montero (Argentina) Diego Álvarez (Chile) Carlos González-Leiva
October 25	Chile F2 Futures; Santiago, Chile; Clay $10,000	(Chile) Guillermo Rivera Aránguiz (Chile) Cristóbal Saavedra Corvalán; 6–7^{(4–7)}, 7–6^{(7–5)}, [11–9]	(Chile) Guillermo Hormazábal (Chile) Rodrigo Pérez	(Peru) Sergio Galdós (Montenegro) Goran Tošić	(Serbia) Nikola Ćirić (Chile) Jorge Montero (Argentina) Diego Álvarez (Chile) Carlos González-Leiva
October 25	France F20 Futures; Rodez, France; Hard (indoor) $10,000+H	(France) Grégoire Burquier; 6–4, 3–6, 6–4	(Latvia) Kārlis Lejnieks	(France) Kenny de Schepper (France) Jonathan Eysseric	(Switzerland) Adrien Bossel (France) Clément Reix (Belgium) Maxime Authom (Monaco) Jean-René Lisnard
October 25	France F20 Futures; Rodez, France; Hard (indoor) $10,000+H	(France) Olivier Charroin (France) Vincent Stouff; 4–6, 7–6^{(10–8)}, [10–4]	(France) Grégoire Burquier (France) Simon Cauvard	(France) Kenny de Schepper (France) Jonathan Eysseric	(Switzerland) Adrien Bossel (France) Clément Reix (Belgium) Maxime Authom (Monaco) Jean-René Lisnard
October 25	Greece F3 Futures; Heraklion, Greece; Carpet $10,000	(Italy) Andrea Falgheri; 6–2, 7–5	(Greece) Alexandros Jakupovic	(Serbia) Nikola Ćaćić (Slovenia) Tom Kočevar-Dešman	(Latvia) Adrians Žguns (Montenegro) Daniel Danilović (Spain) Carlos Gómez-Herrera (Italy) Erik Crepaldi
October 25	Greece F3 Futures; Heraklion, Greece; Carpet $10,000	(Republic of Ireland) Daniel Glancy (United Kingdom) Marcus Willis; 7–5, 5–7, [10–8]	(Republic of Ireland) Sam Barry (Republic of Ireland) Colin O'Brien	(Serbia) Nikola Ćaćić (Slovenia) Tom Kočevar-Dešman	(Latvia) Adrians Žguns (Montenegro) Daniel Danilović (Spain) Carlos Gómez-Herrera (Italy) Erik Crepaldi
October 25	Paraguay F2 Futures; Asunción, Paraguay; Clay $10,000	(Argentina) Agustín Velotti; 7–5 retired	(Argentina) Juan-Pablo Amado	(Italy) Marco Simoni (Argentina) Hector Damián Guichonet	(Italy) Giammarco Micolani (Paraguay) Gustavo Ramírez (Argentina) Alejandro Fabbri (Argentina) Federico Coria
October 25	Paraguay F2 Futures; Asunción, Paraguay; Clay $10,000	(Paraguay) Diego Galeano (Paraguay) Daniel Alejandro López; 7–6^{(7–2)}, 6–4	(Paraguay) José Benítez (Paraguay) Gustavo Ramírez	(Italy) Marco Simoni (Argentina) Hector Damián Guichonet	(Italy) Giammarco Micolani (Paraguay) Gustavo Ramírez (Argentina) Alejandro Fabbri (Argentina) Federico Coria
October 25	Spain F38 Futures; Sant Cugat, Spain; Clay $10,000	(Spain) Guillermo Olaso; 6–2, 7–5	(Spain) Pablo Santos	(Spain) Pedro Clar Rosselló (Spain) Pablo Carreño Busta	(Canada) Steven Diez (Spain) Carles Poch Gradin (Spain) Pablo Martín-Adalia (Spain) Marc Giner
October 25	Spain F38 Futures; Sant Cugat, Spain; Clay $10,000	(Spain) Miguel Ángel López Jaén (Spain) Pablo Santos; 6–1, 6–3	(Spain) Carlos Calderón-Rodríguez (Spain) Gerard Granollers	(Spain) Pedro Clar Rosselló (Spain) Pablo Carreño Busta	(Canada) Steven Diez (Spain) Carles Poch Gradin (Spain) Pablo Martín-Adalia (Spain) Marc Giner
October 25	Turkey F13 Futures; Antalya, Turkey; Clay $10,000	(Germany) Gero Kretschmer; 6–1, 2–0 retired	(Slovakia) Kamil Čapkovič	(Bulgaria) Tihomir Grozdanov (Australia) Samuel Groth	(Russia) Andrey Kumantsov (Turkey) Ergün Zorlu (Belgium) Alexandre Folie (Romania) Adrian Cruciat
October 25	Turkey F13 Futures; Antalya, Turkey; Clay $10,000	(Sweden) Patrik Brydolf (Finland) Micke Kontinen; 6–3, 6–4	(Romania) Adrian Cruciat (Turkey) Anıl Yüksel	(Bulgaria) Tihomir Grozdanov (Australia) Samuel Groth	(Russia) Andrey Kumantsov (Turkey) Ergün Zorlu (Belgium) Alexandre Folie (Romania) Adrian Cruciat
October 25	USA F28 Futures; Birmingham, United States; Clay $10,000	(Canada) Philip Bester; 0–6, 6–2, 6–0	(Australia) James Lemke	(Romania) Cătălin-Ionuț Gârd (Germany) Alexander Satschko	(United States) Andrea Collarini (Haiti) Olivier Sajous (United States) Sekou Bangoura (Australia) Clinton Thomson
October 25	USA F28 Futures; Birmingham, United States; Clay $10,000	(Canada) Philip Bester (Canada) Kamil Pajkowski; 6–7^{(4–7)}, 6–4, [10–5]	(Germany) Dennis Blömke (Australia) James Lemke	(Romania) Cătălin-Ionuț Gârd (Germany) Alexander Satschko	(United States) Andrea Collarini (Haiti) Olivier Sajous (United States) Sekou Bangoura (Australia) Clinton Thomson
October 25	Venezuela F6 Futures; Higuerote, Venezuela; Hard $10,000	(United States) Greg Ouellette; 6–3, 6–2	(Guatemala) Christopher Díaz Figueroa	(Venezuela) David Souto (Colombia) Eduardo Struvay	(Colombia) Alejandro González (United States) Maciek Sykut (Venezuela) Luis David Martínez (France) Jean-Noel Insausti
October 25	Venezuela F6 Futures; Higuerote, Venezuela; Hard $10,000	(United States) Peter Aarts (United States) Maciek Sykut; 6–4, 6–3	(Brazil) Wilson Leite (Brazil) Caio Silva	(Venezuela) David Souto (Colombia) Eduardo Struvay	(Colombia) Alejandro González (United States) Maciek Sykut (Venezuela) Luis David Martínez (France) Jean-Noel Insausti

== November ==
Week of	Tournament	Winner	Runners-up	Semifinalists	Quarterfinalists
November 1	Australia F10 Futures; Kalgoorlie, Australia; Hard $15,000	(Canada) Érik Chvojka; 3–6, 6–3, 7–6^{(7–4)}	(Australia) Brydan Klein	(Finland) Harri Heliövaara (Australia) Nick Lindahl	(Australia) Matt Reid (Australia) Michael Look (Germany) Sebastian Rieschick (Australia) Joel Lindner
November 1	Australia F10 Futures; Kalgoorlie, Australia; Hard $15,000	(Australia) Joel Lindner (Australia) Matt Reid; 7–6^{(7–5)}, 4–6, [10–6]	(Australia) Colin Ebelthite (Australia) Adam Feeney	(Finland) Harri Heliövaara (Australia) Nick Lindahl	(Australia) Matt Reid (Australia) Michael Look (Germany) Sebastian Rieschick (Australia) Joel Lindner
November 1	Israel F4 Futures; Ramat HaSharon, Israel; Hard $15,000	(United Kingdom) Daniel Cox; 3–6, 6–4, 6–4	(Belgium) David Goffin	(United Kingdom) Jamie Baker (United Kingdom) Josh Goodall	(Israel) Amir Weintraub (Israel) Noam Okun (Italy) Thomas Fabbiano (France) Médy Chettar
November 1	Israel F4 Futures; Ramat HaSharon, Israel; Hard $15,000	(Germany) Kevin Krawietz (Russia) Sergei Krotiouk; 2–6, 6–4, [10–5]	(Israel) Noam Behr (Israel) Tal Eros	(United Kingdom) Jamie Baker (United Kingdom) Josh Goodall	(Israel) Amir Weintraub (Israel) Noam Okun (Italy) Thomas Fabbiano (France) Médy Chettar
November 1	Mexico F8 Futures; Guadalajara, Mexico; Clay $15,000	(Moldova) Roman Borvanov; 6–1, 6–4	(Mexico) César Ramírez	(United States) Denis Zivkovic (Mexico) Víctor Romero	(Austria) Rainer Eitzinger (Mexico) Daniel Garza (Australia) Clinton Thomson (United States) Adam El Mihdawy
November 1	Mexico F8 Futures; Guadalajara, Mexico; Clay $15,000	(United States) Maciek Sykut (United States) Denis Zivkovic; 6–7^{(5–7)}, 7–6^{(7–3)}, [10–7]	(Austria) Rainer Eitzinger (Germany) Alexander Satschko	(United States) Denis Zivkovic (Mexico) Víctor Romero	(Austria) Rainer Eitzinger (Mexico) Daniel Garza (Australia) Clinton Thomson (United States) Adam El Mihdawy
November 1	Argentina F22 Futures; Rosário, Argentina; Clay $10,000	(Argentina) Andrés Molteni; 6–2, 6–0	(Argentina) Marco Trungelliti	(Argentina) Lionel Noviski (Argentina) Guido Pella	(Argentina) Gabriel Alejandro Hidalgo (Argentina) Renzo Olivo (Argentina) Jonathan Gonzalia (Italy) Stefano Travaglia
November 1	Argentina F22 Futures; Rosário, Argentina; Clay $10,000	(Argentina) Diego Cristin (Argentina) Pablo Galdón; 6–3, 2–6, [10–7]	(Argentina) Andrés Molteni (Argentina) Guido Pella	(Argentina) Lionel Noviski (Argentina) Guido Pella	(Argentina) Gabriel Alejandro Hidalgo (Argentina) Renzo Olivo (Argentina) Jonathan Gonzalia (Italy) Stefano Travaglia
November 1	Brazil F31 Futures; Porto Alegre, Brazil; Clay $10,000	(Brazil) André Ghem; 6–4, 6–1	(Brazil) André Miele	(Portugal) Gastão Elias (Brazil) Gabriel Dias	(Brazil) Thales Turini (Argentina) Cristhian Ignacio Benedetti (Brazil) Tiago Fernandes (Brazil) Guilherme Clezar
November 1	Brazil F31 Futures; Porto Alegre, Brazil; Clay $10,000	(Brazil) Nicolas Santos (Brazil) Daniel Dutra da Silva; 6–4, 6–1	(Brazil) Diego Matos (Brazil) André Miele	(Portugal) Gastão Elias (Brazil) Gabriel Dias	(Brazil) Thales Turini (Argentina) Cristhian Ignacio Benedetti (Brazil) Tiago Fernandes (Brazil) Guilherme Clezar
November 1	Chile F3 Futures; Santiago, Chile; Clay $10,000	(Chile) Cristóbal Saavedra Corvalán; 2–6, 7–6^{(7–3)}, 7–6^{(7–5)}	(Chile) Juan Carlos Sáez	(Peru) Duilio Beretta (Peru) Mauricio Echazú	(Portugal) Gonçalo Pereira (Argentina) Gastón-Arturo Grimolizzi (Argentina) Diego Álvarez (Peru) Sergio Galdós
November 1	Chile F3 Futures; Santiago, Chile; Clay $10,000	(Chile) Guillermo Hormazábal (Chile) Rodrigo Pérez; 7–6^{(7–5)}, 6–3	(Chile) Guillermo Rivera Aránguiz (Chile) Cristóbal Saavedra Corvalán	(Peru) Duilio Beretta (Peru) Mauricio Echazú	(Portugal) Gonçalo Pereira (Argentina) Gastón-Arturo Grimolizzi (Argentina) Diego Álvarez (Peru) Sergio Galdós
November 1	Greece F4 Futures; Heraklion, Greece; Hard $10,000	(Greece) Alexandros Jakupovic; 6–3, 6–3	(Republic of Ireland) Colin O'Brien	(Spain) Carlos Gómez-Herrera (United Kingdom) Sean Thornley	(Latvia) Adrians Žguns (Serbia) Arsenije Zlatanović (Czech Republic) Jiří Košler (United Kingdom) Marcus Willis
November 1	Greece F4 Futures; Heraklion, Greece; Hard $10,000	(Republic of Ireland) Sam Barry (Latvia) Miķelis Lībietis; 7–6^{(8–6)}, 6–7^{(4–7)}, [11–9]	(Slovenia) Rok Jarc (Slovenia) Tom Kočevar-Dešman	(Spain) Carlos Gómez-Herrera (United Kingdom) Sean Thornley	(Latvia) Adrians Žguns (Serbia) Arsenije Zlatanović (Czech Republic) Jiří Košler (United Kingdom) Marcus Willis
November 1	Laos F1 Futures; Vientiane, Laos; Hard $10,000	(Thailand) Kittiphong Wachiramanowong; 7–6^{(7–5)}, 7–6^{(8–6)}	(Croatia) Roko Karanušić	(United States) Sean Berman (Chinese Taipei) Jimmy Wang	(China) Gao Wan (Chinese Taipei) Chen Ti (Chinese Taipei) Lee Hsin-han (United States) Andrew Gerst
November 1	Laos F1 Futures; Vientiane, Laos; Hard $10,000	(China) Gao Peng (China) Gao Wan; 6–3, 6–4	(France) Dorian Descloix (France) Yannick Jankovits	(United States) Sean Berman (Chinese Taipei) Jimmy Wang	(China) Gao Wan (Chinese Taipei) Chen Ti (Chinese Taipei) Lee Hsin-han (United States) Andrew Gerst
November 1	Paraguay F3 Futures; Encarnación, Paraguay; Clay $10,000	(Argentina) Juan-Pablo Amado; 6–4, 6–4	(Argentina) Alejandro Fabbri	(Italy) Marco Simoni (Italy) Matteo Marrai	(Italy) Federico Gaio (Paraguay) Diego Galeano (Italy) Filippo Leonardi (Uruguay) Martín Cuevas
November 1	Paraguay F3 Futures; Encarnación, Paraguay; Clay $10,000	(Paraguay) Diego Galeano (Paraguay) Daniel Alejandro López; 7–5, 7–6^{(7–4)}	(Italy) Filippo Leonardi (Italy) Giammarco Micolani	(Italy) Marco Simoni (Italy) Matteo Marrai	(Italy) Federico Gaio (Paraguay) Diego Galeano (Italy) Filippo Leonardi (Uruguay) Martín Cuevas
November 1	Spain F39 Futures; Vilafranca del Penedès, Spain; Clay $10,000	(Spain) José Checa Calvo; 2–6, 6–4, 6–1	(Italy) Marco Viola	(France) Antony Dupuis (Spain) Oscar Sabate-Bretos	(Russia) Ivan Nedelko (Spain) Pedro Clar Rosselló (Spain) Marc Fornell (Spain) Juan Lizariturry
November 1	Spain F39 Futures; Vilafranca del Penedès, Spain; Clay $10,000	(Spain) Carlos Rexach-Itoiz (Spain) Gabriel Trujillo Soler; 6–2, 6–2	(Spain) David Cañudas-Fernández (Spain) Marc Dolcet	(France) Antony Dupuis (Spain) Oscar Sabate-Bretos	(Russia) Ivan Nedelko (Spain) Pedro Clar Rosselló (Spain) Marc Fornell (Spain) Juan Lizariturry
November 1	Turkey F14 Futures; Antalya, Turkey; Clay $10,000	(Austria) Michael Linzer; 2–6, 7–6^{(7–4)}, 7–6^{(7–2)}	(Sweden) Michael Ryderstedt	(Argentina) Dario Pérez (Romania) Adrian Cruciat	(Sweden) Patrik Brydolf (Finland) Micke Kontinen (Romania) Andrei Mlendea (United Kingdom) Alexander Ward
November 1	Turkey F14 Futures; Antalya, Turkey; Clay $10,000	(Bulgaria) Tihomir Grozdanov (Bulgaria) Alexandar Lazov; 6–4, 4–6, [11–9]	(Belgium) Marco Dierckx (Belgium) Bart Govaerts	(Argentina) Dario Pérez (Romania) Adrian Cruciat	(Sweden) Patrik Brydolf (Finland) Micke Kontinen (Romania) Andrei Mlendea (United Kingdom) Alexander Ward
November 1	USA F29 Futures; Niceville, United States; Clay $10,000	(Hungary) Ádám Kellner; 6–3, 7–6^{(7–3)}	(Australia) James Lemke	(United States) Denis Kudla (Germany) Dennis Blömke	(United States) Jordan Cox (United States) Andrea Collarini (Romania) Cătălin-Ionuț Gârd (United States) Robbye Poole
November 1	USA F29 Futures; Niceville, United States; Clay $10,000	(United States) Robbye Poole (Norway) Erling Tveit; 7–6^{(7–4)}, 6–2	(United States) Andrea Collarini (United States) Denis Kudla	(United States) Denis Kudla (Germany) Dennis Blömke	(United States) Jordan Cox (United States) Andrea Collarini (Romania) Cătălin-Ionuț Gârd (United States) Robbye Poole
November 8	Australia F11 Futures; Esperance, Australia; Hard $15,000	(Germany) Sebastian Rieschick; 6–3, 6–4	(Australia) Brydan Klein	(Australia) Michael Look (Australia) Jared Easton	(Canada) Érik Chvojka (Finland) Harri Heliövaara (Australia) Colin Ebelthite (Australia) Joel Lindner
November 8	Australia F11 Futures; Esperance, Australia; Hard $15,000	(Australia) Brydan Klein (Australia) Nima Roshan; 6–3, 6–4	(Australia) Colin Ebelthite (Australia) Adam Feeney	(Australia) Michael Look (Australia) Jared Easton	(Canada) Érik Chvojka (Finland) Harri Heliövaara (Australia) Colin Ebelthite (Australia) Joel Lindner
November 8	Iran F6 Futures; Kish Island, Iran; Clay $15,000	(Croatia) Kristijan Mesaroš; 6–4, 6–4	(Slovakia) Ivo Klec	(Italy) Walter Trusendi (Russia) Valery Rudnev	(France) Jules Marie (Austria) Gerald Melzer (Serbia) David Savić (Japan) Koki Matsunaga
November 8	Iran F6 Futures; Kish Island, Iran; Clay $15,000	(Italy) Enrico Burzi (Italy) Walter Trusendi; 6–3, 6–2	(Austria) Gerald Melzer (Croatia) Kristijan Mesaroš	(Italy) Walter Trusendi (Russia) Valery Rudnev	(France) Jules Marie (Austria) Gerald Melzer (Serbia) David Savić (Japan) Koki Matsunaga
November 8	Israel F5 Futures; Tel Aviv, Israel; Hard $15,000	(France) Grégoire Burquier; 6–1, 6–3	(France) Rudy Coco	(United Kingdom) Josh Goodall (Russia) Victor Baluda	(Poland) Piotr Gadomski (Netherlands) Antal van der Duim (Germany) Kevin Krawietz (Israel) Amir Weintraub
November 8	Israel F5 Futures; Tel Aviv, Israel; Hard $15,000	(France) Rudy Coco (France) Fabrice Martin; 6–3, 6–4	(Germany) Kevin Krawietz (Russia) Sergei Krotiouk	(United Kingdom) Josh Goodall (Russia) Victor Baluda	(Poland) Piotr Gadomski (Netherlands) Antal van der Duim (Germany) Kevin Krawietz (Israel) Amir Weintraub
November 8	Mexico F9 Futures; Durango, Mexico; Hard $15,000	(Moldova) Roman Borvanov; 6–3, 6–4	(Mexico) Víctor Romero	(Mexico) César Ramírez (Germany) Alexander Satschko	(Mexico) Luis Díaz Barriga (Mexico) Manuel Sánchez (Mexico) Miguel Gallardo Valles (United Kingdom) Olivier Golding
November 8	Mexico F9 Futures; Durango, Mexico; Hard $15,000	(Moldova) Roman Borvanov (Mexico) Víctor Romero; 6–3, 6–4	(United States) Maciek Sykut (United States) Denis Zivkovic	(Mexico) César Ramírez (Germany) Alexander Satschko	(Mexico) Luis Díaz Barriga (Mexico) Manuel Sánchez (Mexico) Miguel Gallardo Valles (United Kingdom) Olivier Golding
November 8	Brazil F32 Futures; Barueri, Brazil; Hard $10,000	(Brazil) Daniel Dutra da Silva; 6–7^{(0–7)}, 7–6^{(7–3)}, 7–6^{(7–5)}	(Portugal) Gastão Elias	(Italy) Giorgio Portaluri (Brazil) Rafael Camilo	(Brazil) Danilo Ferraz (Argentina) Juan-Pablo Villar (Brazil) Fernando Romboli (Brazil) André Miele
November 8	Brazil F32 Futures; Barueri, Brazil; Hard $10,000	(Brazil) Victor Maynard (Brazil) Nicolas Santos; 6–3, 6–3	(Brazil) Rodrigo-Antonio Grilli (Brazil) Fernando Romboli	(Italy) Giorgio Portaluri (Brazil) Rafael Camilo	(Brazil) Danilo Ferraz (Argentina) Juan-Pablo Villar (Brazil) Fernando Romboli (Brazil) André Miele
November 8	Chile F4 Futures; Santiago, Chile; Clay $10,000	(Slovenia) Borut Puc; 6–3, 7–6^{(7–2)}	(Argentina) Pablo Galdón	(Italy) Filippo Leonardi (Chile) Cristóbal Saavedra Corvalán	(Chile) Guillermo Hormazábal (Chile) Hans Podlipnik Castillo (Italy) Marco Simoni (Chile) Guillermo Rivera Aránguiz
November 8	Chile F4 Futures; Santiago, Chile; Clay $10,000	(Chile) Guillermo Rivera Aránguiz (Chile) Cristóbal Saavedra Corvalán; 6–3, 6–1	(Chile) Guillermo Hormazábal (Chile) Rodrigo Pérez	(Italy) Filippo Leonardi (Chile) Cristóbal Saavedra Corvalán	(Chile) Guillermo Hormazábal (Chile) Hans Podlipnik Castillo (Italy) Marco Simoni (Chile) Guillermo Rivera Aránguiz
November 8	Peru F1 Futures; Arequipa, Peru; Clay $10,000	(Argentina) Sebastián Decoud; 7–6^{(7–4)}, 7–6^{(7–5)}	(Peru) Mauricio Echazú	(Argentina) Juan Pablo Ortíz (Peru) Duilio Beretta	(Bolivia) Ryusei Makiguchi (Argentina) Guido Andreozzi (Uruguay) Martín Cuevas (Argentina) Patricio Heras
November 8	Peru F1 Futures; Arequipa, Peru; Clay $10,000	(Uruguay) Martín Cuevas (Argentina) Juan Manoel Romanazzi; 6–4, 7–6^{(7–5)}	(Peru) Francisco Carbajal (Peru) Mauricio Echazú	(Argentina) Juan Pablo Ortíz (Peru) Duilio Beretta	(Bolivia) Ryusei Makiguchi (Argentina) Guido Andreozzi (Uruguay) Martín Cuevas (Argentina) Patricio Heras
November 8	Thailand F4 Futures; Khon Kaen, Thailand; Hard $10,000	(Japan) Yūichi Sugita; 6–4, 6–2	(Japan) Arata Onozawa	(Belgium) Alexandre Folie (South Korea) Kim Cheong-eui	(South Korea) An Jae-sung (China) Gao Wan (Belgium) Alec Witmeur (New Zealand) Matt Simpson
November 8	Thailand F4 Futures; Khon Kaen, Thailand; Hard $10,000	(Indonesia) Christopher Rungkat (Thailand) Kirati Siributwong; 6–2, 7–6^{(8–6)}	(France) Dorian Descloix (France) Yannick Jankovits	(Belgium) Alexandre Folie (South Korea) Kim Cheong-eui	(South Korea) An Jae-sung (China) Gao Wan (Belgium) Alec Witmeur (New Zealand) Matt Simpson
November 8	Turkey F15 Futures; Antalya, Turkey; Clay $10,000	(France) Gianni Mina; 6–3, 6–3	(Germany) Alexander Flock	(Serbia) Ivan Bjelica (Germany) Peter Torebko	(Romania) Andrei Mlendea (United Kingdom) Liam Broady (Bulgaria) Tihomir Grozdanov (Sweden) Michael Ryderstedt
November 8	Turkey F15 Futures; Antalya, Turkey; Clay $10,000	(Serbia) Ivan Bjelica (Sweden) Patrik Brydolf; 6–7^{(1–7)}, 6–4, [10–8]	(Bulgaria) Tihomir Grozdanov (Bulgaria) Alexandar Lazov	(Serbia) Ivan Bjelica (Germany) Peter Torebko	(Romania) Andrei Mlendea (United Kingdom) Liam Broady (Bulgaria) Tihomir Grozdanov (Sweden) Michael Ryderstedt
November 8	USA F30 Futures; Pensacola, United States; Clay $10,000	(Germany) Dennis Blömke; 6–1, 6–3	(United States) Phillip Simmonds	(Australia) James Lemke (Australia) Clinton Thomson	(United States) Jordan Cox (Hungary) Ádám Kellner (Romania) Cătălin-Ionuț Gârd (Zimbabwe) Takanyi Garanganga
November 8	USA F30 Futures; Pensacola, United States; Clay $10,000	(Bulgaria) Dimitar Kutrovsky (United States) Jack Sock; 5–7, 6–2, [10–8]	(United States) Devin Britton (United States) Jordan Cox	(Australia) James Lemke (Australia) Clinton Thomson	(United States) Jordan Cox (Hungary) Ádám Kellner (Romania) Cătălin-Ionuț Gârd (Zimbabwe) Takanyi Garanganga
November 15	Czech Republic F4 Futures; Rožnov pod Radhoštěm, Czech Republic; Carpet (indoor) $15,000	(Czech Republic) Jan Mertl; 7–6^{(7–4)}, 1–6, 6–3	(United Kingdom) Daniel Smethurst	(Czech Republic) Jiří Veselý (Czech Republic) Robert Rumler	(Russia) Denis Matsukevich (Italy) Luca Vanni (Czech Republic) Michal Schmid (Poland) Robert Godlewski
November 15	Czech Republic F4 Futures; Rožnov pod Radhoštěm, Czech Republic; Carpet (indoor) $15,000	(Poland) Marcin Gawron (Russia) Denis Matsukevich; 6–3, 7–6^{(7–5)}	(Czech Republic) Roman Jebavý (Czech Republic) Jan Mertl	(Czech Republic) Jiří Veselý (Czech Republic) Robert Rumler	(Russia) Denis Matsukevich (Italy) Luca Vanni (Czech Republic) Michal Schmid (Poland) Robert Godlewski
November 15	Iran F7 Futures; Kish Island, Iran; Clay $15,000	(Ukraine) Artem Smirnov; 6–1, 6–2	(Italy) Walter Trusendi	(Russia) Valery Rudnev (Italy) Enrico Burzi	(Slovakia) Ivo Klec (Austria) Gerald Melzer (India) Ranjeet Virali-Murugesan (Serbia) David Savić
November 15	Iran F7 Futures; Kish Island, Iran; Clay $15,000	(Austria) Gerald Melzer (Croatia) Kristijan Mesaroš; 6–3, 6–3	(Slovakia) Ivo Klec (Serbia) David Savić	(Russia) Valery Rudnev (Italy) Enrico Burzi	(Slovakia) Ivo Klec (Austria) Gerald Melzer (India) Ranjeet Virali-Murugesan (Serbia) David Savić
November 15	New Zealand F1 Futures; Wellington, New Zealand; Hard $15,000	(Germany) Sebastian Rieschick; 7–5, 6–3	(Australia) Brydan Klein	(Australia) Samuel Groth (Australia) James Duckworth	(Italy) Riccardo Sinicropi (Australia) Benjamin Mitchell (Russia) Artem Sitak (New Zealand) José Statham
November 15	New Zealand F1 Futures; Wellington, New Zealand; Hard $15,000	(Australia) Brydan Klein (Australia) Dane Propoggia; 4–6, 6–4, [10–1]	(Australia) Nima Roshan (New Zealand) José Statham	(Australia) Samuel Groth (Australia) James Duckworth	(Italy) Riccardo Sinicropi (Australia) Benjamin Mitchell (Russia) Artem Sitak (New Zealand) José Statham
November 15	Brazil F33 Futures; Belo Horizonte, Brazil; Clay $10,000	(Brazil) Fernando Romboli; 6–3, 6–2	(Brazil) Thales Turini	(Brazil) Fabiano de Paula (Argentina) Juan-Pablo Villar	(Brazil) Thiago Monteiro (Brazil) André Ghem (Brazil) Nicolas Santos (Portugal) Francisco Dias
November 15	Brazil F33 Futures; Belo Horizonte, Brazil; Clay $10,000	(Brazil) Guilherme Clezar (Brazil) André Ghem; 6–3, 6–2	(Italy) Giorgio Portaluri (Argentina) Juan-Pablo Villar	(Brazil) Fabiano de Paula (Argentina) Juan-Pablo Villar	(Brazil) Thiago Monteiro (Brazil) André Ghem (Brazil) Nicolas Santos (Portugal) Francisco Dias
November 15	Chile F5 Futures; Quillota, Chile; Clay $10,000	(Chile) Guillermo Rivera Aránguiz; 6–2, 6–3	(Argentina) Pablo Galdón	(Chile) Hans Podlipnik Castillo (Chile) Cristóbal Saavedra Corvalán	(Italy) Stefano Travaglia (Spain) Enrique López Pérez (Argentina) Gabriel Alejandro Hidalgo (Italy) Filippo Leonardi
November 15	Chile F5 Futures; Quillota, Chile; Clay $10,000	(Chile) Hans Podlipnik Castillo (Chile) Ricardo Urzúa-Rivera; 7–6^{(8–6)}, 6–4	(Chile) Guillermo Hormazábal (Chile) Rodrigo Pérez	(Chile) Hans Podlipnik Castillo (Chile) Cristóbal Saavedra Corvalán	(Italy) Stefano Travaglia (Spain) Enrique López Pérez (Argentina) Gabriel Alejandro Hidalgo (Italy) Filippo Leonardi
November 15	Peru F2 Futures; Chosica, Peru; Clay $10,000	(Argentina) Guido Andreozzi; 6–3, 6–4	(Argentina) Juan-Pablo Amado	(Peru) Mauricio Echazú (Uruguay) Martín Cuevas	(Colombia) Nicolás Barrientos (Argentina) Renzo Olivo (Colombia) Sebastián Serrano (Argentina) Juan Pablo Ortíz
November 15	Peru F2 Futures; Chosica, Peru; Clay $10,000	(Argentina) Juan-Pablo Amado (Uruguay) Martín Cuevas; 6–3, 6–4	(Peru) Rafael Aita (Brazil) Diego Matos	(Peru) Mauricio Echazú (Uruguay) Martín Cuevas	(Colombia) Nicolás Barrientos (Argentina) Renzo Olivo (Colombia) Sebastián Serrano (Argentina) Juan Pablo Ortíz
November 15	Spain F40 Futures; Madrid, Spain; Clay $10,000	(Italy) Alessandro Giannessi; 7–5, 6–2	(Spain) Javier Martí	(Spain) Rafael Mazón-Hernández (Spain) Oscar Sabate-Bretos	(France) Gianni Mina (Spain) Iván Arenas-Gualda (Spain) Juan-Samuel Arauzo-Martinez (Spain) Marc Giner
November 15	Spain F40 Futures; Madrid, Spain; Clay $10,000	(Spain) Óscar Burrieza (Spain) Javier Martí; Walkover	(Netherlands) Joop Bos (Italy) Manuel Mazzella	(Spain) Rafael Mazón-Hernández (Spain) Oscar Sabate-Bretos	(France) Gianni Mina (Spain) Iván Arenas-Gualda (Spain) Juan-Samuel Arauzo-Martinez (Spain) Marc Giner
November 15	Thailand F5 Futures; Nonthaburi, Thailand; Hard $10,000	(Japan) Yūichi Sugita; 6–4, 6–1	(Croatia) Roko Karanušić	(France) Yannick Jankovits (Japan) Hiroki Moriya	(South Korea) Kim Dylan Seong-kwan (Japan) Hiroyasu Ehara (South Korea) Kim Cheong-eui (Japan) Arata Onozawa
November 15	Thailand F5 Futures; Nonthaburi, Thailand; Hard $10,000	(India) Vijayant Malik (India) Sriram Balaji; 6–3, 7–6^{(9–7)}	(China) Gao Peng (China) Gao Wan	(France) Yannick Jankovits (Japan) Hiroki Moriya	(South Korea) Kim Dylan Seong-kwan (Japan) Hiroyasu Ehara (South Korea) Kim Cheong-eui (Japan) Arata Onozawa
November 15	USA F31 Futures; Amelia Island, United States; Clay $10,000	(Canada) Philip Bester; 7–6^{(7–2)}, 6–4	(Hungary) Ádám Kellner	(Haiti) Olivier Sajous (Romania) Andrei Dăescu	(Bulgaria) Dimitar Kutrovsky (France) Jean-Noel Insausti (United States) Andrea Collarini (Romania) Cătălin-Ionuț Gârd
November 15	USA F31 Futures; Amelia Island, United States; Clay $10,000	(Croatia) Mislav Hižak (United States) Robbye Poole; 6–2, 7–6^{(7–3)}	(Bulgaria) Dimitar Kutrovsky (United States) Jack Sock	(Haiti) Olivier Sajous (Romania) Andrei Dăescu	(Bulgaria) Dimitar Kutrovsky (France) Jean-Noel Insausti (United States) Andrea Collarini (Romania) Cătălin-Ionuț Gârd
November 22	Australia F12 Futures; Traralgon, Australia; Hard $15,000	(Israel) Amir Weintraub; 6–2, 6–4	(Australia) Samuel Groth	(Canada) Érik Chvojka (Russia) Artem Sitak	(Australia) Benjamin Mitchell (Australia) Michael Look (Thailand) Danai Udomchoke (Australia) James Duckworth
November 22	Australia F12 Futures; Traralgon, Australia; Hard $15,000	(Australia) Colin Ebelthite (Australia) Adam Feeney; 6–3, 4–6, [15–13]	(Australia) Samuel Groth (Germany) Sebastian Rieschick	(Canada) Érik Chvojka (Russia) Artem Sitak	(Australia) Benjamin Mitchell (Australia) Michael Look (Thailand) Danai Udomchoke (Australia) James Duckworth
November 22	Czech Republic F5 Futures; Ostrava, Czech Republic; Carpet (indoor) $15,000	(Czech Republic) Jan Mertl; 7–5, 6–2	(Czech Republic) Pavel Šnobel	(Ukraine) Sergey Bubka (Slovakia) Miloslav Mečíř Jr.	(Czech Republic) Roman Jebavý (Croatia) Ante Pavić (Republic of Ireland) Colin O'Brien (Poland) Marcin Gawron
November 22	Czech Republic F5 Futures; Ostrava, Czech Republic; Carpet (indoor) $15,000	(Czech Republic) Michal Konečný (Czech Republic) Daniel Lustig; 7–6^{(9–7)}, 6–2	(Czech Republic) Radim Urbánek (Czech Republic) Jiří Veselý	(Ukraine) Sergey Bubka (Slovakia) Miloslav Mečíř Jr.	(Czech Republic) Roman Jebavý (Croatia) Ante Pavić (Republic of Ireland) Colin O'Brien (Poland) Marcin Gawron
November 22	Sudan F1 Futures; Khartoum, Sudan; Clay $15,000	(Slovakia) Ivo Klec; 6–2, 6–2	(Bosnia and Herzegovina) Aldin Šetkić	(Tunisia) Malek Jaziri (Russia) Mikhail Vasiliev	(Serbia) David Savić (South Africa) Steffen Solomon (Austria) Gerald Melzer (Croatia) Kristijan Mesaroš
November 22	Sudan F1 Futures; Khartoum, Sudan; Clay $15,000	(Spain) Jordi Muñoz Abreu (Russia) Ivan Nedelko; 2–6, 6–4, [11–9]	(Serbia) David Savić (Bosnia and Herzegovina) Aldin Šetkić	(Tunisia) Malek Jaziri (Russia) Mikhail Vasiliev	(Serbia) David Savić (South Africa) Steffen Solomon (Austria) Gerald Melzer (Croatia) Kristijan Mesaroš
November 22	Brazil F34 Futures; Foz do Iguaçu, Brazil; Clay $10,000	(Argentina) Juan-Pablo Villar; 6–1, 6–3	(Brazil) André Ghem	(Brazil) Danilo Ferraz (Brazil) Guilherme Clezar	(Argentina) Gastón Giussani (Brazil) Nicolas Santos (Brazil) Thales Turini (Portugal) Francisco Dias
November 22	Brazil F34 Futures; Foz do Iguaçu, Brazil; Clay $10,000	(Brazil) Guilherme Clezar (Brazil) André Ghem; 6–1, 6–4	(Paraguay) Diego Galeano (Paraguay) Daniel Alejandro López	(Brazil) Danilo Ferraz (Brazil) Guilherme Clezar	(Argentina) Gastón Giussani (Brazil) Nicolas Santos (Brazil) Thales Turini (Portugal) Francisco Dias
November 22	Chile F6 Futures; Rancagua, Chile; Clay $10,000	(Italy) Stefano Travaglia; 6–4, 6–1	(Chile) Cristóbal Saavedra Corvalán	(Chile) Juan Carlos Sáez (Chile) Guillermo Hormazábal	(Chile) Guillermo Rivera Aránguiz (Chile) Rodrigo Pérez (Chile) Hans Podlipnik Castillo (United Kingdom) James Feaver
November 22	Chile F6 Futures; Rancagua, Chile; Clay $10,000	(Chile) Guillermo Rivera Aránguiz (Chile) Cristóbal Saavedra Corvalán; 6–3, 6–4	(Chile) Javier Muñoz (Chile) Juan Carlos Sáez	(Chile) Juan Carlos Sáez (Chile) Guillermo Hormazábal	(Chile) Guillermo Rivera Aránguiz (Chile) Rodrigo Pérez (Chile) Hans Podlipnik Castillo (United Kingdom) James Feaver
November 22	Dominic Republic F1 Futures; Santo Domingo, Dominican Republic; Hard $10,000	(Dominican Republic) Víctor Estrella; 6–1, 2–6, 6–1	(Netherlands) Matwé Middelkoop	(Germany) Peter Gojowczyk (Moldova) Roman Borvanov	(India) Yuki Bhambri (France) Pierre-Hugues Herbert (Uruguay) Ariel Behar (Venezuela) Piero Luisi
November 22	Dominic Republic F1 Futures; Santo Domingo, Dominican Republic; Hard $10,000	(Venezuela) Piero Luisi (Venezuela) Román Recarte; 6–3, 3–6, [10–8]	(Latvia) Miķelis Lībietis (Latvia) Deniss Pavlovs	(Germany) Peter Gojowczyk (Moldova) Roman Borvanov	(India) Yuki Bhambri (France) Pierre-Hugues Herbert (Uruguay) Ariel Behar (Venezuela) Piero Luisi
November 22	Mexico F10 Futures; Colima, Mexico; Hard $10,000	(United States) James Ludlow; 7–6^{(7–4)}, 6–4	(Mexico) César Ramírez	(Mexico) Luis Díaz Barriga (Australia) Matheson Klein	(United States) Chris Kwon (Mexico) Miguel Gallardo Valles (Australia) Mark Verryth (Ecuador) Iván Endara
November 22	Mexico F10 Futures; Colima, Mexico; Hard $10,000	(Mexico) Daniel Garza (United States) Chris Kwon; 6–2, 6–1	(United States) James Ludlow (United States) Christian Welte	(Mexico) Luis Díaz Barriga (Australia) Matheson Klein	(United States) Chris Kwon (Mexico) Miguel Gallardo Valles (Australia) Mark Verryth (Ecuador) Iván Endara
November 22	Peru F3 Futures; Lima, Peru; Clay $10,000	(Argentina) Juan-Pablo Amado; 6–2, 6–1	(United States) Ryan Young	(Argentina) Patricio Heras (Peru) Mauricio Echazú	(Argentina) Renzo Olivo (Belgium) Germain Gigounon (Peru) Iván Miranda (Uruguay) Martín Cuevas
November 22	Peru F3 Futures; Lima, Peru; Clay $10,000	(Brazil) Diego Matos (Argentina) Renzo Olivo; 6–3, 3–6, [10–3]	(Ecuador) Julio César Campozano (Ecuador) Emilio Gómez	(Argentina) Patricio Heras (Peru) Mauricio Echazú	(Argentina) Renzo Olivo (Belgium) Germain Gigounon (Peru) Iván Miranda (Uruguay) Martín Cuevas
November 29	Australia F13 Futures; Bendigo, Australia; Hard $15,000	(Australia) Samuel Groth; 7–6^{(9–7)}, 6–4	(Australia) Benjamin Mitchell	(Australia) Dayne Kelly (Germany) Sebastian Rieschick	(Australia) Brydan Klein (Australia) Adam Feeney (Israel) Amir Weintraub (Russia) Artem Sitak
November 29	Australia F13 Futures; Bendigo, Australia; Hard $15,000	(Australia) Colin Ebelthite (Australia) Adam Feeney; 6–2, 6–4	(Australia) Adam Hubble (Australia) Brydan Klein	(Australia) Dayne Kelly (Germany) Sebastian Rieschick	(Australia) Brydan Klein (Australia) Adam Feeney (Israel) Amir Weintraub (Russia) Artem Sitak
November 29	Sudan F2 Futures; Khartoum, Sudan; Clay $15,000	(Slovakia) Ivo Klec; 6–3, 7–5	(Bosnia and Herzegovina) Aldin Šetkić	(Russia) Mikhail Vasiliev (Serbia) David Savić	(Egypt) Sherif Sabry (Russia) Ivan Nedelko (Tunisia) Malek Jaziri (Russia) Alexei Filenkov
November 29	Sudan F2 Futures; Khartoum, Sudan; Clay $15,000	(Serbia) David Savić (Bosnia and Herzegovina) Aldin Šetkić; 6–2, 6–4	(Austria) Richard Ruckelshausen (Austria) Bertram Steinberger	(Russia) Mikhail Vasiliev (Serbia) David Savić	(Egypt) Sherif Sabry (Russia) Ivan Nedelko (Tunisia) Malek Jaziri (Russia) Alexei Filenkov
November 29	Chile F7 Futures; Talca, Chile; Clay $10,000	(Chile) Guillermo Hormazábal; 6–4, 6–3	(Argentina) Nicolás Pastor	(Argentina) Guillermo Durán (Chile) Guillermo Rivera Aránguiz	(Argentina) Kevin Konfederak (Argentina) Marco Trungelliti (Spain) Ignacio Coll Riudavets (Chile) Cristóbal Saavedra Corvalán
November 29	Chile F7 Futures; Talca, Chile; Clay $10,000	(Chile) Guillermo Hormazábal (Chile) Hans Podlipnik Castillo; 7–5, 6–7^{(10–12)}, [10–5]	(Argentina) Guillermo Durán (Argentina) Kevin Konfederak	(Argentina) Guillermo Durán (Chile) Guillermo Rivera Aránguiz	(Argentina) Kevin Konfederak (Argentina) Marco Trungelliti (Spain) Ignacio Coll Riudavets (Chile) Cristóbal Saavedra Corvalán
November 29	Dominic Republic F2 Futures; Santo Domingo, Dominican Republic; Hard $10,000	(Dominican Republic) Víctor Estrella; 6–1, 6–3	(France) Pierre-Hugues Herbert	(Haiti) Olivier Sajous (France) Rudy Coco	(India) Yuki Bhambri (Russia) Dmitri Sitak (Italy) Roberto Marcora (Netherlands) Matwé Middelkoop
November 29	Dominic Republic F2 Futures; Santo Domingo, Dominican Republic; Hard $10,000	(France) Pierre-Hugues Herbert (Germany) Kevin Krawietz; 7–6^{(7–4)}, 6–3	(Venezuela) Piero Luisi (Venezuela) Román Recarte	(Haiti) Olivier Sajous (France) Rudy Coco	(India) Yuki Bhambri (Russia) Dmitri Sitak (Italy) Roberto Marcora (Netherlands) Matwé Middelkoop
November 29	Mexico F11 Futures; Chiapas, Mexico; Hard $10,000	(Australia) Mark Verryth; 5–7, 6–2, 6–0	(United States) Adam El Mihdawy	(United States) Christopher Racz (Mexico) Miguel Ángel Reyes-Varela	(Mexico) Luis Díaz Barriga (Bulgaria) Boris Nicola Bakalov (United States) Ty Trombetta (United States) Christian Welte
November 29	Mexico F11 Futures; Chiapas, Mexico; Hard $10,000	(United States) Adam El Mihdawy (United States) Ty Trombetta; 6–4, 6–7^{(4–7)}, [10–7]	(Bulgaria) Boris Nicola Bakalov (Austria) Rainer Eitzinger	(United States) Christopher Racz (Mexico) Miguel Ángel Reyes-Varela	(Mexico) Luis Díaz Barriga (Bulgaria) Boris Nicola Bakalov (United States) Ty Trombetta (United States) Christian Welte

== December ==
Week of	Tournament	Winner	Runners-up	Semifinalists	Quarterfinalists
December 6	Brazil F36 Futures; Araçatuba, Brazil; Clay $10,000	(Argentina) Facundo Bagnis; 6–2, 6–3	(Brazil) Eládio Ribeiro Neto	(Brazil) Fernando Romboli (Brazil) Danilo Ferraz	(Brazil) Leonardo Kirche (Brazil) Marcelo Demoliner (Brazil) Daniel Dutra da Silva (Brazil) Andrew Lauret
December 6	Brazil F36 Futures; Araçatuba, Brazil; Clay $10,000	(Brazil) Marcelo Demoliner (Brazil) Fernando Romboli; 6–3, 7–6^{(7–3)}	(Brazil) Fabiano de Paula (Brazil) Daniel Dutra da Silva	(Brazil) Fernando Romboli (Brazil) Danilo Ferraz	(Brazil) Leonardo Kirche (Brazil) Marcelo Demoliner (Brazil) Daniel Dutra da Silva (Brazil) Andrew Lauret
December 6	Chile F8 Futures; Concepción, Chile; Clay $10,000	(Croatia) Borut Puc; 6–2, 6–7^{(4–7)}, 7–6^{(7–3)}	(Chile) Guillermo Hormazábal	(Argentina) Marco Trungelliti (Argentina) Guillermo Durán	(Chile) Guillermo Rivera Aránguiz (Chile) Rodrigo Pérez (Argentina) Guido Andreozzi (Chile) Cristóbal Saavedra Corvalán
December 6	Chile F8 Futures; Concepción, Chile; Clay $10,000	(Chile) Guillermo Rivera Aránguiz (Chile) Cristóbal Saavedra Corvalán; 7–5, 6–3	(Argentina) Martín Ríos-Benítez (Argentina) Rodrigo Scattareggia	(Argentina) Marco Trungelliti (Argentina) Guillermo Durán	(Chile) Guillermo Rivera Aránguiz (Chile) Rodrigo Pérez (Argentina) Guido Andreozzi (Chile) Cristóbal Saavedra Corvalán
December 6	Dominic Republic F3 Futures; Santo Domingo, Dominican Republic; Hard $10,000	(Dominican Republic) Víctor Estrella; 6–4, 6–2	(Netherlands) Matwé Middelkoop	(France) Pierre-Hugues Herbert (Haiti) Olivier Sajous	(Germany) Peter Gojowczyk (France) Rudy Coco (Moldova) Roman Borvanov (Belgium) Julien Dubail
December 6	Dominic Republic F3 Futures; Santo Domingo, Dominican Republic; Hard $10,000	(France) Pierre-Hugues Herbert (France) Romain Sichez; 7–6^{(10–8)}, 6–3	(Latvia) Miķelis Lībietis (Latvia) Deniss Pavlovs	(France) Pierre-Hugues Herbert (Haiti) Olivier Sajous	(Germany) Peter Gojowczyk (France) Rudy Coco (Moldova) Roman Borvanov (Belgium) Julien Dubail
December 6	Mexico F12 Futures; Guerrero, Mexico; Clay $10,000	(Austria) Rainer Eitzinger; 6–2, 6–3	(Ecuador) Iván Endara	(Australia) Matheson Klein (Mexico) Daniel Garza	(Mexico) Mauricio Astorga (Mexico) César Ramírez (Mexico) Miguel Gallardo Valles (United States) Chris Kwon
December 6	Mexico F12 Futures; Guerrero, Mexico; Clay $10,000	(Mexico) Luis Díaz Barriga (Mexico) Miguel Ángel Reyes-Varela; 6–2, 6–3	(Guatemala) Christopher Díaz Figueroa (Ecuador) Iván Endara	(Australia) Matheson Klein (Mexico) Daniel Garza	(Mexico) Mauricio Astorga (Mexico) César Ramírez (Mexico) Miguel Gallardo Valles (United States) Chris Kwon
December 13	Brazil F37 Futures; Guarulhos, Brazil; Clay $10,000	(Brazil) Fernando Romboli; 6–1, 6–0	(Brazil) Leonardo Kirche	(Brazil) Thales Turini (Brazil) Daniel Dutra da Silva	(Brazil) Andrew Lauret (Brazil) Eládio Ribeiro Neto (Brazil) Danilo Ferraz (Argentina) Juan-Pablo Villar
December 13	Brazil F37 Futures; Guarulhos, Brazil; Clay $10,000	(Brazil) Gabriel Dias (Brazil) Leonardo Kirche; 6–4, 7–6^{(10–8)}	(Brazil) Victor Maynard (Brazil) Nicolas Santos	(Brazil) Thales Turini (Brazil) Daniel Dutra da Silva	(Brazil) Andrew Lauret (Brazil) Eládio Ribeiro Neto (Brazil) Danilo Ferraz (Argentina) Juan-Pablo Villar
December 13	Chile F9 Futures; Concepción, Chile; Clay $10,000	(Chile) Cristóbal Saavedra Corvalán; 7–6^{(7–3)}, 6–1	(Italy) Stefano Travaglia	(Chile) Juan Carlos Sáez (Chile) Ricardo Urzúa-Rivera	(Chile) Guillermo Rivera Aránguiz (Chile) Guillermo Hormazábal (Argentina) Guido Andreozzi (Chile) Felipe Ríos
December 13	Chile F9 Futures; Concepción, Chile; Clay $10,000	(Chile) Javier Muñoz (Chile) Juan Carlos Sáez; 6–4, 6–4	(Argentina) Patricio Heras (Argentina) Gustavo Sterin	(Chile) Juan Carlos Sáez (Chile) Ricardo Urzúa-Rivera	(Chile) Guillermo Rivera Aránguiz (Chile) Guillermo Hormazábal (Argentina) Guido Andreozzi (Chile) Felipe Ríos
December 13	Cuba F1 Futures; Havana, Cuba; Hard $10,000	(Latvia) Deniss Pavlovs; 6–2, 6–1	(Guatemala) Christopher Díaz Figueroa	(United States) Christopher Racz (Venezuela) Román Recarte	(France) Romain Sichez (France) Antoine Tassart (Haiti) Olivier Sajous (Belgium) Julien Dubail
December 13	Cuba F1 Futures; Havana, Cuba; Hard $10,000	(United Kingdom) Miles Bugby (Canada) Kamil Pajkowski; 6–3, 7–6^{(7–4)}	(United Kingdom) Daniel Cochrane (United Kingdom) Richard Gabb	(United States) Christopher Racz (Venezuela) Román Recarte	(France) Romain Sichez (France) Antoine Tassart (Haiti) Olivier Sajous (Belgium) Julien Dubail
December 20	Brazil F38 Futures; Sorocaba, Brazil; Clay $10,000	(Brazil) Fernando Romboli; 6–2, 6–1	(Brazil) Thales Turini	(Brazil) Ricardo Siggia (Brazil) Leonardo Kirche	(Brazil) Daniel Dutra da Silva (Brazil) Luiz Guilherme Deneka (Brazil) Filipe Brandão (Brazil) José Pereira
December 20	Brazil F38 Futures; Sorocaba, Brazil; Clay $10,000	(Brazil) Tiago Slonik (Brazil) Thales Turini; 6–0, 6–2	(Brazil) Charles Costa (Brazil) Danilo Ferraz	(Brazil) Ricardo Siggia (Brazil) Leonardo Kirche	(Brazil) Daniel Dutra da Silva (Brazil) Luiz Guilherme Deneka (Brazil) Filipe Brandão (Brazil) José Pereira
