= 2011 Dunlop World Challenge – Men's singles =

Men's singles
- 2011 Dunlop World Challenge

Final
- Champion: (Japan) Tatsuma Ito
- Runner-up: (Germany) Sebastian Rieschick
- Score: 6–4, 6–2

Events
Singles	men	women
Doubles	men	women
← 2010 ·	Dunlop World Challenge	· 2012 →

Tatsuma Ito was the defending champion, and successfully defended his title, defeating Sebastian Rieschick in the final 6–4, 6–2.

== Seeds ==
1. (Japan) Go Soeda (quarterfinals)
2. (Japan) Tatsuma Ito (champion)
3. (Japan) Yūichi Sugita (semifinals)
4. (Thailand) Danai Udomchoke (first round)
5. (Germany) Andre Begemann (second round)
6. (Moldova) Roman Borvanov (first round)
7. (Germany) Sebastian Rieschick (final)
8. (Chinese Taipei) Jummy Wang (second round)

== Draw ==
=== Key ===
- Q = Qualifier
- WC = Wild card
- LL = Lucky loser
- Alt = Alternate
- SE = Special exempt
- PR = Protected ranking
- ITF = ITF entry
- JE = Junior exempt
- w/o = Walkover
- r = Retired
- d = Defaulted
- SR = Special ranking

=== Finals ===
Semifinals
7	(Germany) Sebastian Rieschick	6	1	6
3	(Japan) Yūichi Sugita	4	6	3
(Japan) Takao Suzuki	3	3
2	(Japan) Tatsuma Ito	6	6

Final
7	(Germany) Sebastian Rieschick	4	2
2	(Japan) Tatsuma Ito	6	6

=== Top half ===
First round
1	(Japan) G Soeda	7^{7}	7^{7}
Q	(Chinese Taipei) Wang Chieh-fu	6^{4}	6^{5}
(Chinese Taipei) T Chen	6^{4}	6	6
(South Korea) D Yoo	7^{7}	2	4
WC	(Japan) Shota Tagawa	6	6
(Japan) Kento Takeuchi	3	2
(Switzerland) A Sadecky	4	2
7	(Germany) S Rieschick	6	6
3	(Japan) Y Sugita	5	6	6
(United States) JP Fruttero	7	4	4
WC	(Japan) Arata Onozawa	6	7^{12}
Q	(China) W Gao	3	6^{10}
(India) Y Bhambri	7	7^{7}
(Romania) C Gârd	5	6^{1}
WC	(Japan) Takeshi Endo	3	6	2
8	(Chinese Taipei) J Wang	6	3	6

Second round
1	(Japan) G Soeda	7^{7}	4	6
(Chinese Taipei) T Chen	6^{5}	6	3
WC	(Japan) Shota Tagawa	3	2
7	(Germany) S Rieschick	6	6
3	(Japan) Y Sugita	7^{7}	6
WC	(Japan) Arata Onozawa	6^{4}	1
(India) Y Bhambri	5	6	6
8	(Chinese Taipei) J Wang	7	4	2

Quarterfinals
1	(Japan) G Soeda	6	6^{9}	4
7	(Germany) S Rieschick	3	7^{11}	6
3	(Japan) Y Sugita	6	6
(India) Y Bhambri	2	1

Semifinals
7	(Germany) S Rieschick	6	1	6
3	(Japan) Y Sugita	4	6	3

=== Bottom half ===
First round
6	(Moldova) R Borvanov	3	1
(Japan) T Matsui	6	6
(Japan) Hiroyasu Ehara	3	2
(Japan) H Kondo	6	6
(South Korea) S-J Cho	3	4
(South Korea) W-s Jun	6	6
(Japan) T Suzuki	7^{8}	7^{12}
4	(Thailand) D Udomchoke	6^{6}	6^{10}
5	(Germany) A Begemann	6	6
Q	(Japan) Masatoshi Miyazaki	4	4
(Japan) Y Uchiyama	6	6
Q	(South Korea) J-m Lee	4	2
(Japan) Hiroki Moriya	6	6
WC	(Japan) Takuto Niki	3	3
(Japan) B Sato	7	6^{5}	1
2	(Japan) T Ito	5	7^{7}	6

Second round
(Japan) T Matsui	6	6
(Japan) H Kondo	3	4
(South Korea) W-s Jun	6^{3}	4
(Japan) T Suzuki	7^{7}	6
5	(Germany) A Begemann	4	7	4
(Japan) Y Uchiyama	6	5	6
(Japan) Hiroki Moriya	3	4
2	(Japan) T Ito	6	6

Quarterfinals
(Japan) T Matsui	3	6	6^{3}
(Japan) T Suzuki	6	3	7^{7}
(Japan) Y Uchiyama	3	4
2	(Japan) T Ito	6	6

Semifinals
(Japan) T Suzuki	3	3
2	(Japan) T Ito	6	6
