= 2011 Dunlop World Challenge – Men's doubles =

Men's doubles
- 2011 Dunlop World Challenge

Final
- Champions: (Japan) Hiroki Kondo; (Chinese Taipei) Yi Chu-huan
- Runners-up: (China) Gao Peng; (China) Gao Wan
- Score: 6–4, 6–1

Events
Singles	men	women
Doubles	men	women
← 2010 ·	Dunlop World Challenge	· 2012 →

Treat Conrad Huey and Purav Raja were the defending champions but Huey decided not to participate.
Raja plays alongside Divij Sharan, but lost in the first round to Gao Peng and Gao Wan.

Hiroki Kondo and Yi Chu-huan won the title, defeating Gao Peng and Gao Wan in the final, 6–4, 6–1.

== Seeds ==
1. (Germany) Andre Begemann / (United States) John Paul Fruttero (semifinals)
2. (India) Purav Raja / (India) Divij Sharan (first round)
3. (Japan) Hiroki Kondo / (Chinese Taipei) Yi Chu-huan (champions)
4. (Japan) Toshihide Matsui / (Thailand) Danai Udomchoke (semifinals)

== Draw ==
=== Key ===
- Q = Qualifier
- WC = Wild card
- LL = Lucky loser
- Alt = Alternate
- SE = Special exempt
- PR = Protected ranking
- ITF = ITF entry
- JE = Junior exempt
- w/o = Walkover
- r = Retired
- d = Defaulted
- SR = Special ranking

=== Draw ===
First round

Quarterfinals

Semifinals

Final

1
- (Germany) A Begemann
- (United States) JP Fruttero
1
7^{9}
[10]

(Japan) T Ito
(Japan) Yasutaka Uchiyama
6
6^{7}
[4]

1
- (Germany) A Begemann
- (United States) JP Fruttero
6
6

- (Chinese Taipei) T Chen
- (Germany) S Rieschick
6^{5}
2

WC
- (Japan) Hiroyasu Ehara
- (Japan) T Suzuki
3
2

WC
- (Japan) Hiroyasu Ehara
- (Japan) T Suzuki
7^{7}
6

1
- (Germany) A Begemann
- (United States) JP Fruttero
6^{2}
7^{7}
[4]

3
- (Japan) H Kondo
- (Chinese Taipei) C-h Yi
7^{7}
6

3
- (Japan) H Kondo
- (Chinese Taipei) C-h Yi
7^{7}
6^{3}
[10]

- (Moldova) R Borvanov
- (Switzerland) A Sadecky
6^{5}
4

3
- (Japan) H Kondo
- (Chinese Taipei) C-h Yi
6
7^{7}

- (Japan) Shuichi Sekiguchi
- (Japan) Y Sugita
3
7
[5]

WC
(Japan) Takeshi Endo
(Japan) Hiroyasu Sato
4
6^{3}

WC
(Japan) Takeshi Endo
(Japan) Hiroyasu Sato
6
5
[10]

3
- (Japan) H Kondo
- (Chinese Taipei) C-h Yi
6
6

WC
(New Zealand) Jaden Grinter
(Japan) Takumi Hernandez
4
4

- (China) Gao Peng
- (China) W Gao
4
1

- (Japan) Hiroki Moriya
- (Japan) B Sato
6
6

- (Japan) Hiroki Moriya
- (Japan) B Sato
4
6
[9]

- (South Korea) W-s Jun
- (South Korea) D Yoo
2
2

4
- (Japan) T Matsui
- (Thailand) D Udomchoke
6
4
[11]

4
- (Japan) T Matsui
- (Thailand) D Udomchoke
6
6

4
- (Japan) T Matsui
- (Thailand) D Udomchoke
3
4

(Chinese Taipei) J Wang
(Chinese Taipei) Wang Chieh-fu
6^{4}
6
[7]

- (China) Gao Peng
- (China) W Gao
6
6

(Japan) Yuichi Ito
(Japan) Kento Takeuchi
7^{7}
4
[10]

(Japan) Yuichi Ito
(Japan) Kento Takeuchi
6
3
[5]

- (China) Gao Peng
- (China) W Gao
6^{1}
7^{7}
[10]

- (China) Gao Peng
- (China) W Gao
4
6
[10]

2
- (India) P Raja
- (India) D Sharan
7^{7}
6^{5}
[5]
