= 2012 Dunlop World Challenge – Women's singles =

Women's singles
- 2012 Dunlop World Challenge

Final
- Champion: (Switzerland) Stefanie Vögele
- Runner-up: (Japan) Kimiko Date-Krumm
- Score: 7–6^{(7–3)}, 6–4

Events
Singles	men	women
Doubles	men	women
← 2011 ·	Dunlop World Challenge	· 2013 →

Tamarine Tanasugarn was the defending champion, but lost in the semifinals to Stefanie Vögele.

Vögele won the tournament, defeating Kimiko Date-Krumm in the final, 7–6^{(7–3)}, 6–4.

== Seeds ==
1. (Australia) Casey Dellacqua (quarterfinals)
2. (Japan) Misaki Doi (second round)
3. (Switzerland) Stefanie Vögele (champion)
4. (Japan) Kimiko Date-Krumm (final)
5. (Thailand) Tamarine Tanasugarn (semifinals)
6. (Japan) Kurumi Nara (quarterfinals)
7. (Australia) Ashleigh Barty (quarterfinals)
8. (Japan) Erika Sema (first round)

== Main draw ==
=== Key ===
- Q = Qualifier
- WC = Wild card
- LL = Lucky loser
- Alt = Alternate
- SE = Special exempt
- PR = Protected ranking
- ITF = ITF entry
- JE = Junior exempt
- w/o = Walkover
- r = Retired
- d = Defaulted
- SR = Special ranking

=== Finals ===
Semifinals
5	(Thailand) Tamarine Tanasugarn	3	3
3	(Switzerland) Stefanie Vögele	6	6
4	(Japan) Kimiko Date-Krumm	6	6
(United Kingdom) Samantha Murray	3	2

Final
3	(Switzerland) Stefanie Vögele	7^{7}	6
4	(Japan) Kimiko Date-Krumm	6^{3}	4

=== Top half ===
First round
1	(Australia) C Dellacqua	6	4	6
(Thailand) N Lertcheewakarn	3	6	1
(China) Y Xu	6	7
WC	(Japan) M Ninomiya	4	5
(China) Q Wang	6	4	4
(United States) N Gibbs	3	6	6
(Japan) A Omae	3	3
5	(Thailand) T Tanasugarn	6	6
3	(Switzerland) S Vögele	6	6
Q	(Japan) R Sawayanagi	1	2
(Russia) D Gavrilova	6	6
Q	(Japan) M Miyamura	3	3
(Japan) J Namigata	7	6
WC	(Japan) E Takao	5	2
Q	(Japan) R Ozaki	0	0
7/JE	(Australia) A Barty	6	6

Second round
1	(Australia) C Dellacqua	6	6
(China) Y Xu	2	4
(United States) N Gibbs	6	2	1
5	(Thailand) T Tanasugarn	4	6	6
3	(Switzerland) S Vögele	7	7^{7}
(Russia) D Gavrilova	5	6^{5}
(Japan) J Namigata	1	0
7/JE	(Australia) A Barty	6	6

Quarterfinals
1	(Australia) C Dellacqua	6	3	2
5	(Thailand) T Tanasugarn	4	6	6
3	(Switzerland) S Vögele	7^{7}	6
7/JE	(Australia) A Barty	6^{4}	2

Semifinals
5	(Thailand) T Tanasugarn	3	3
3	(Switzerland) S Vögele	6	6

=== Bottom half ===
First round
6	(Japan) K Nara	6	6
(Chinese Taipei) C-w Chan	3	4
(Thailand) V Wongteanchai	2	6	6
WC	(Kazakhstan) Z Diyas	6	2	4
(Japan) M Eguchi	6	7^{13}
(Russia) A Rodionova	3	6^{11}
(Russia) K Lykina	1	0^{r}
4	(Japan) K Date-Krumm	6	3
8	(Japan) E Sema	3	2
(Thailand) N Luangnam	6	6
Q	(Japan) S Aoyama	6	6^{5}	6
(Japan) Y Sema	4	7^{7}	4
(United Kingdom) S Murray	6	4	6
(United States) C-Y Hsu	4	6	1
WC	(Japan) M Tanaka	3	0
2	(Japan) M Doi	6	6

Second round
6	(Japan) K Nara	4	6	6
(Thailand) V Wongteanchai	6	0	3
(Japan) M Eguchi	3	2
4	(Japan) K Date-Krumm	6	6
(Thailand) N Luangnam	6	2	6
Q	(Japan) S Aoyama	4	6	2
(United Kingdom) S Murray	6	3	7^{8}
2	(Japan) M Doi	4	6	6^{6}

Quarterfinals
6	(Japan) K Nara	5	3
4	(Japan) K Date-Krumm	7	6
(Thailand) N Luangnam	2	7^{7}	4
(United Kingdom) S Murray	6	6^{5}	6

Semifinals
4	(Japan) K Date-Krumm	6	6
(United Kingdom) S Murray	3	2
