= 2012 Dunlop World Challenge – Men's doubles =

Men's doubles
- 2012 Dunlop World Challenge

Final
- Champions: (Austria) Philipp Oswald; (Croatia) Mate Pavić
- Runners-up: (Italy) Andrea Arnaboldi; (Italy) Matteo Viola
- Score: 6–3, 3–6, [10–2]

Events
Singles	men	women
Doubles	men	women
← 2011 ·	Dunlop World Challenge	· 2013 →

Hiroki Kondo and Yi Chu-huan were the defending champions, but lost in the quarterfinals.
Philipp Oswald and Mate Pavić won the title, defeating Andrea Arnaboldi and Matteo Viola 6–3, 3–6, [10–2] in the final.

== Seeds ==
1. (Thailand) Sanchai Ratiwatana / (Thailand) Sonchat Ratiwatana (semifinals)
2. (India) Purav Raja / (India) Divij Sharan (first round)
3. (Chinese Taipei) Lee Hsin-han / (Chinese Taipei) Peng Hsien-yin (first round)
4. (Austria) Philipp Oswald / (Croatia) Mate Pavić (champions)

== Draw ==
=== Key ===
- Q = Qualifier
- WC = Wild card
- LL = Lucky loser
- Alt = Alternate
- SE = Special exempt
- PR = Protected ranking
- ITF = ITF entry
- JE = Junior exempt
- w/o = Walkover
- r = Retired
- d = Defaulted
- SR = Special ranking

=== Draw ===
First round

Quarterfinals

Semifinals

Final

1
- (Thailand) Sa Ratiwatana
- (Thailand) So Ratiwatana
7^{7}
6

- (Netherlands) Stephan Fransen
- (Australia) J Millman
6^{2}
3

1
- (Thailand) Sa Ratiwatana
- (Thailand) So Ratiwatana
6
6

- (Bosnia and Herzegovina) M Bašić
- (Chinese Taipei) T Chen
7^{7}
6

- (Bosnia and Herzegovina) M Bašić
- (Chinese Taipei) T Chen
4
3

- (Chinese Taipei) C-p Hsieh
- (Indonesia) C Rungkat
6^{1}
1

1
- (Thailand) Sa Ratiwatana
- (Thailand) So Ratiwatana
3
6
[8]

3
- (Chinese Taipei) H-h Lee
- (Chinese Taipei) H-y Peng
1
7^{7}
[3]

- (Italy) A Arnaboldi
- (Italy) M Viola
6
3
[10]

- (Australia) B Klein
- (Australia) D Propoggia
6
6^{3}
[10]

- (Australia) B Klein
- (Australia) D Propoggia
6
4
5

WC
(Japan) Hiroyasu Ehara
(Japan) Takeshi Endō
6
1
[0]

- (Italy) A Arnaboldi
- (Italy) M Viola
4
6
10

- (Italy) Andrea Arnaboldi
- (Italy) M Viola
2
6
[10]

- (Italy) A Arnaboldi
- (Italy) M Viola
3
6
[2]

- (Chinese Taipei) L-c Huang
- (Chinese Taipei) T-h Yang
2
1

4
- (Austria) P Oswald
- (Croatia) M Pavić
6
3
[10]

- (Japan) H Kondo
- (Chinese Taipei) C-h Yi
6
6

- (Japan) H Kondo
- (Chinese Taipei) C-h Yi
2
6
[4]

WC
- (Japan) T Matsui
- (Japan) T Suzuki
5
6^{3}

4
- (Austria) P Oswald
- (Croatia) M Pavić
6
4
[10]

4
- (Austria) P Oswald
- (Croatia) M Pavić
7
7^{7}

4
- (Austria) P Oswald
- (Croatia) M Pavić
7^{7}
6

PR
- (India) P Amritraj
- (United States) J Cerretani
6
6

PR
- (India) P Amritraj
- (United States) J Cerretani
6^{1}
4

WC
(Japan) B Sato
(Japan) Shota Tagawa
4
3

PR
- (India) P Amritraj
- (United States) J Cerretani
6
6

- (United Kingdom) J Baker
- (Switzerland) H Laaksonen
7
7^{7}

- (United Kingdom) J Baker
- (Switzerland) H Laaksonen
0
3

2
- (India) P Raja
- (India) D Sharan
5
6^{5}
