= 2011 Dunlop World Challenge – Women's singles =

Women's singles
- 2011 Dunlop World Challenge

Final
- Champion: (Thailand) Tamarine Tanasugarn
- Runner-up: (Japan) Kimiko Date-Krumm
- Score: 6–2, 7–5

Events
Singles	men	women
Doubles	men	women
← 2010 ·	Dunlop World Challenge	· 2012 →

Misaki Doi is the defending champion but lost to Tamarine Tanasugarn 5–7, 5–7 in the quarterfinals.

Tamarine Tanasugarn won the title, defeating Kimiko Date-Krumm in the final 6–2, 7–5.

== Seeds ==
1. (Japan) Kimiko Date-Krumm (final)
2. (Japan) Misaki Doi (quarterfinals)
3. (Netherlands) Michaëlla Krajicek (semifinals, withdrew)
4. (Japan) Erika Sema (first round)
5. (Thailand) Tamarine Tanasugarn
6. (Chinese Taipei) Chan Yung-jan (semifinals)
7. (Japan) Kurumi Nara (second round)
8. (France) Caroline Garcia (second round)

== Draw ==
=== Key ===
- Q = Qualifier
- WC = Wild card
- LL = Lucky loser
- Alt = Alternate
- SE = Special exempt
- PR = Protected ranking
- ITF = ITF entry
- JE = Junior exempt
- w/o = Walkover
- r = Retired
- d = Defaulted
- SR = Special ranking

=== Finals ===
Semifinals
1	(Japan) Kimiko Date-Krumm	w/o
3	(Netherlands) Michaëlla Krajicek
6	(Chinese Taipei) Chan Yung-jan	6	2	4
5	(Thailand) Tamarine Tanasugarn	1	6	6

Final
1	(Japan) Kimiko Date-Krumm	2	5
5	(Thailand) Tamarine Tanasugarn	6	7

=== Top half ===
First round
1	(Japan) K Date-Krumm	6	6
WC	(Japan) K Hisami	0	3
(Chinese Taipei) W-h Hsu	4	7^{7}	2
(Slovenia) A Klepač	6	6^{3}	6
Q	(Thailand) N Luangnam	6	6^{4}	7
Q	(Chinese Taipei) C-w Chan	2	7^{7}	5
(Japan) S Akita	4	7	2
7	(Japan) K Nara	6	5	6
3	(Netherlands) M Krajicek	6	6
(South Korea) S-j Kim	2	2
(Ukraine) E Svitolina	6	6
LL	(Japan) S Aoyama	2	2
(Slovenia) T Majerič	6	6
WC	(Japan) M Tanaka	4	4
Q	(Japan) Y Higuchi	3	3
8	(France) C Garcia	6	6

Second round
1	(Japan) K Date-Krumm	6	6
(Slovenia) A Klepač	1	1
Q	(Thailand) N Luangnam	7^{10}	6
7	(Japan) K Nara	6^{8}	2
3	(Netherlands) M Krajicek	6	6
(Ukraine) E Svitolina	2	3
(Slovenia) T Majerič	3	7^{7}	6
8	(France) C Garcia	6	6^{5}	2

Quarterfinals
1	(Japan) K Date-Krumm	6	7
Q	(Thailand) N Luangnam	1	5
3	(Netherlands) M Krajicek	7^{9}	6
(Slovenia) T Majerič	6^{7}	2

Semifinals
1	(Japan) K Date-Krumm	w/o
3	(Netherlands) M Krajicek

=== Bottom half ===
First round
6	(Chinese Taipei) Y-j Chan	6	6
(Japan) E Takao	1	1
(Japan) R Fujiwara	6	7
(Japan) Y Sema	1	5
(Japan) A Nakamura	3	4
(Slovakia) Z Luknárová	6	6
Q	(Japan) A Oka	6	6
4	(Japan) E Sema	2	2
5	(Thailand) T Tanasugarn	7^{7}	6
(China) Q Wang	6^{2}	0
(Japan) J Namigata	5	7^{10}	4
WC	(Russia) K Lykina	7	6^{8}	6
(Japan) K Iijima	5	7^{7}	4
WC	(Japan) M Ninomiya	7	6^{5}	6
(Japan) A Omae	1	2
2	(Japan) M Doi	6	6

Second round
6	(Chinese Taipei) Y-j Chan	6	6
(Japan) R Fujiwara	3	2
(Slovakia) Z Luknárová	1	7	6
Q	(Japan) A Oka	6	5	2
5	(Thailand) T Tanasugarn	6	6
WC	(Russia) K Lykina	2	2
WC	(Japan) M Ninomiya	3	3
2	(Japan) M Doi	6	6

Quarterfinals
6	(Chinese Taipei) Y-j Chan	6	6
(Slovakia) Z Luknárová	3	0
5	(Thailand) T Tanasugarn	7	7
2	(Japan) M Doi	5	5

Semifinals
6	(Chinese Taipei) Y-j Chan	6	2	4
5	(Thailand) T Tanasugarn	1	6	6
