= 2011 Dunlop World Challenge – Women's doubles =

Women's doubles
- 2011 Dunlop World Challenge

Final
- Champions: (Japan) Makoto Ninomiya (Japan) Riko Sawayanagi
- Runners-up: (France) Caroline Garcia (Netherlands) Michaëlla Krajicek
- Score: Walkover

Events
Singles	men	women
Doubles	men	women
← 2010 ·	Dunlop World Challenge	· 2012 →

Shuko Aoyama and Rika Fujiwara were the defending Champions, but lost to Caroline Garcia and Michaëlla Krajicek in the semifinals.

Makoto Ninomiya and Riko Sawayanagi won the title, defeating Caroline Garcia and Michaëlla Krajicek in the final by a Walkover.

== Seeds ==
1. (Chinese Taipei) Chan Hao-ching / (Chinese Taipei) Chan Yung-jan (semifinals)
2. (Japan) Shuko Aoyama / (Japan) Rika Fujiwara (semifinals)
3. (Slovenia) Andreja Klepač / (Slovenia) Tadeja Majerič (first round)
4. (France) Caroline Garcia / (Netherlands) Michaëlla Krajicek (final, withdrew)

== Draw ==
=== Key ===
- Q = Qualifier
- WC = Wild card
- LL = Lucky loser
- Alt = Alternate
- SE = Special exempt
- PR = Protected ranking
- ITF = ITF entry
- JE = Junior exempt
- w/o = Walkover
- r = Retired
- d = Defaulted
- SR = Special ranking

=== Draw ===
First round
1	(Chinese Taipei) H-c Chan (Chinese Taipei) Y-j Chan	6	6
WC	(Japan) A Nakamura (Japan) J Namigata	2	4
WC	(Japan) M Doi (Japan) K Nara	6	2	[6]
(Japan) K Hisami (Japan) A Omae	2	6	[10]
3	(Slovenia) A Klepač (Slovenia) T Majerič	7^{7}	5	[7]
WC	(Japan) M Ninomiya (Japan) R Sawayanagi	6^{5}	7	[10]
(Chinese Taipei) W-h Hsu (Japan) K Iijima	6	6^{5}	[10]
(Japan) N Hamamura (Japan) A Oka	2	7^{7}	[7]
(South Korea) S-j Kim (Japan) E Takao	6^{3}	5
(Japan) R Tezuka (Japan) A Yonemura	7^{7}	7
(Chinese Taipei) C-w Chan (Chinese Taipei) Y Chen	4	4
4	(France) C Garcia (Netherlands) M Krajicek	6	6
(Japan) E Sema (Japan) Y Sema	6	3	[7]
(Russia) K Lykina (Ukraine) E Svitolina	3	6	[10]
(Chinese Taipei) S-y Kao (Japan) M Tanaka	0	4
2	(Japan) S Aoyama (Japan) R Fujiwara	6	6

Quarterfinals
1	(Chinese Taipei) H-c Chan (Chinese Taipei) Y-j Chan	6	6
(Japan) K Hisami (Japan) A Omae	2	1
WC	(Japan) M Ninomiya (Japan) R Sawayanagi	6	7^{7}
(Chinese Taipei) W-h Hsu (Japan) K Iijima	4	6^{5}
(Japan) R Tezuka (Japan) A Yonemura	4	4
4	(France) C Garcia (Netherlands) M Krajicek	6	6
(Russia) K Lykina (Ukraine) E Svitolina	2	5
2	(Japan) S Aoyama (Japan) R Fujiwara	6	7

Semifinals
1	(Chinese Taipei) H-c Chan (Chinese Taipei) Y-j Chan	7	4	[6]
WC	(Japan) M Ninomiya (Japan) R Sawayanagi	5	6	[10]
4	(France) C Garcia (Netherlands) M Krajicek	6	6
2	(Japan) S Aoyama (Japan) R Fujiwara	3	2

Finals
WC	(Japan) M Ninomiya (Japan) R Sawayanagi	w/o
4	(France) C Garcia (Netherlands) M Krajicek
