= 2012 Dunlop World Challenge – Women's doubles =

Women's doubles
- 2012 Dunlop World Challenge

Final
- Champions: (Australia) Ashleigh Barty (Australia) Casey Dellacqua
- Runners-up: (Japan) Miki Miyamura (Thailand) Varatchaya Wongteanchai
- Score: 6–1, 6–2

Events
Singles	men	women
Doubles	men	women
← 2011 ·	Dunlop World Challenge	· 2013 →

Makoto Ninomiya and Riko Sawayanagi were the defending champions, but lost in the first round to Miki Miyamura and Varatchaya Wongteanchai.

Ashleigh Barty and Casey Dellacqua won the tournament, defeating Miyamura and Wongteanchai in the final, 6–1, 6–2.

== Seeds ==
1. (Australia) Ashleigh Barty / (Australia) Casey Dellacqua (champions)
2. (Thailand) Noppawan Lertcheewakarn / (Russia) Arina Rodionova (quarterfinals)
3. (Japan) Miki Miyamura / (Thailand) Varatchaya Wongteanchai (final)
4. (Chinese Taipei) Hsieh Shu-ying / (China) Xu Yifan (quarterfinals)

== Draw ==
=== Key ===
- Q = Qualifier
- WC = Wild card
- LL = Lucky loser
- Alt = Alternate
- SE = Special exempt
- PR = Protected ranking
- ITF = ITF entry
- JE = Junior exempt
- w/o = Walkover
- r = Retired
- d = Defaulted
- SR = Special ranking

First round
1	(Australia) A Barty (Australia) C Dellacqua	6	6
(Thailand) N Lertpitaksinchai (Thailand) P Plipuech	4	0
WC	(Japan) M Tanaka (Japan) R Tezuka	4	2
(United Kingdom) S Murray (United Kingdom) E Webley-Smith	6	6
4	(Chinese Taipei) S-y Hsieh (China) Y Xu	6	6^{6}	[10]
(Chinese Taipei) C-w Chan (China) C Liu	2	7^{8}	[6]
WC	(Japan) S Aoyama (Japan) M Doi	7	7
(Chinese Taipei) S-y Kao (Chinese Taipei) H-c Lee	5	5
(Japan) E Sema (Japan) Y Sema	5	1
WC	(Kazakhstan) Z Diyas (Russia) K Lykina	7	6
(Japan) M Ninomiya (Japan) R Sawayanagi	6	4	[5]
3	(Japan) M Miyamura (Thailand) V Wongteanchai	3	6	[10]
(United States) C-Y Hsu (Japan) A Omae	1	6	[16]
(Japan) M Eguchi (Japan) J Namigata	6	3	[14]
(Chinese Taipei) W-h Hsu (Japan) C Okadaue	3	3
2	(Thailand) N Lertcheewakarn (Russia) A Rodionova	6	6

Quarterfinals
1	(Australia) A Barty (Australia) C Dellacqua	6	6
(United Kingdom) S Murray (United Kingdom) E Webley-Smith	2	1
4	(Chinese Taipei) S-y Hsieh (China) Y Xu	6^{3}	7	[9]
WC	(Japan) S Aoyama (Japan) M Doi	7^{7}	5	[11]
WC	(Kazakhstan) Z Diyas (Russia) K Lykina	6	5	[4]
3	(Japan) M Miyamura (Thailand) V Wongteanchai	2	7	[10]
(United States) C-Y Hsu (Japan) A Omae	6	6
2	(Thailand) N Lertcheewakarn (Russia) A Rodionova	1	2

Semifinals
1	(Australia) A Barty (Australia) C Dellacqua	6	7^{7}
WC	(Japan) S Aoyama (Japan) M Doi	1	6^{4}
3	(Japan) M Miyamura (Thailand) V Wongteanchai	6	3	[10]
(United States) C-Y Hsu (Japan) A Omae	3	6	[6]

Final
1	(Australia) A Barty (Australia) C Dellacqua	6	6
3	(Japan) M Miyamura (Thailand) V Wongteanchai	1	2
