= 2012 Dunlop World Challenge =

- Date: 19–25 November
- Edition: 5th
- Category: ATP Challenger Tour (men); ITF Women's Circuit (women)
- Prize money: €35,000+H (men) $75,000+H (women)
- Surface: Carpet (indoor)
- Location: Toyota, Japan

Champions

Men's singles
- (Poland) Michał Przysiężny

Women's singles
- (Switzerland) Stefanie Vögele

Men's doubles
- (Austria) Philipp Oswald / (Croatia) Mate Pavić

Women's doubles
- (Australia) Ashleigh Barty / (Australia) Casey Dellacqua
← 2011 ·	Dunlop World Challenge	· 2013 →

The 2012 Dunlop World Challenge was a professional tennis tournament played on indoor carpet courts. The fifth edition of the Dunlop World Challenge tournament, it was part of the 2012 ATP Challenger Tour and the 2012 ITF Women's Circuit. It took place on 19–25 November 2012 in Toyota, Japan.

== Men's singles entrants ==
=== Seeds ===
Country	Player	Rank^{1}	Seed
JPN	Yūichi Sugita	122	1
USA	Rajeev Ram	134	2
ITA	Matteo Viola	138	3
TPE	Jimmy Wang	156	4
JPN	Hiroki Moriya	188	5
TPE	Chen Ti	205	6
AUS	John Millman	233	7
AUS	Brydan Klein	242	8

- ^{1} Rankings as of 12 November 2012

=== Other entrants ===
The following players received wildcards into the singles main draw:

- (Japan) Hiroyasu Ehara
- (Japan) Sho Katayama
- (Japan) Hiroki Kondo
- (Japan) Takao Suzuki

The following players received entry from the qualifying draw:

- (Japan) Toshihide Matsui
- (Republic of Ireland) James McGee
- (Japan) Takuto Niki
- (France) Julien Obry

== Women's singles entrants ==
=== Seeds ===
Country	Player	Rank^{1}	Seed
AUS	Casey Dellacqua	88	1
JPN	Misaki Doi	92	2
SUI	Stefanie Vögele	116	3
JPN	Kimiko Date-Krumm	119	4
THA	Tamarine Tanasugarn	133	5
JPN	Kurumi Nara	160	6
AUS	Ashleigh Barty	183	7
JPN	Erika Sema	192	8

- ^{1} Rankings as of 12 November 2012

=== Other entrants ===
The following players received wildcards into the singles main draw:

- (Kazakhstan) Zarina Diyas
- (Japan) Makoto Ninomiya
- (Japan) Erika Takao
- (Japan) Mari Tanaka

The following players received entry from the qualifying draw:

- (Japan) Shuko Aoyama
- (Japan) Miki Miyamura
- (Japan) Risa Ozaki
- (Japan) Riko Sawayanagi

The following player received entry by a Junior Exempt:

- (Australia) Ashleigh Barty

== Champions ==
=== Men's singles ===
- (Poland) Michał Przysiężny def. (Japan) Hiroki Moriya 6–2, 6–3

=== Women's singles ===
- (Switzerland) Stefanie Vögele def. (Japan) Kimiko Date-Krumm 7–6^{(7–3)}, 6–4

=== Men's doubles ===
- (Austria) Philipp Oswald / (Croatia) Mate Pavić def. (Italy) Andrea Arnaboldi / (Italy) Matteo Viola 6–3, 3–6, [10–2]

=== Women's doubles ===
- (Australia) Ashleigh Barty / (Australia) Casey Dellacqua def. (Japan) Miki Miyamura / (Thailand) Varatchaya Wongteanchai 6–1, 6–2
