= 2012 Dunlop World Challenge – Men's singles =

Men's singles
- 2012 Dunlop World Challenge

Final
- Champion: (Poland) Michał Przysiężny
- Runner-up: (Japan) Hiroki Moriya
- Score: 6–2, 6–3

Events
Singles	men	women
Doubles	men	women
- Dunlop World Challenge

Tatsuma Ito was the defending champion but decided not to participate.
Michał Przysiężny defeated Hiroki Moriya 6–2, 6–3 in the final to win the title.

== Seeds ==
1. (Japan) Yūichi Sugita (semifinals)
2. (United States) Rajeev Ram (first round)
3. (Italy) Matteo Viola (quarterfinals)
4. (Chinese Taipei) Jimmy Wang (quarterfinals)
5. (Japan) Hiroki Moriya (final)
6. (Chinese Taipei) Chen Ti (second round)
7. (Australia) John Millman (semifinals)
8. (Australia) Brydan Klein (first round)

== Draw ==
Key

- Q = Qualifier
- WC = Wild card
- LL = Lucky loser
- Alt = Alternate
- ITF = ITF entry
- PR = Protected ranking
- SR = Special ranking
- SE = Special exempt
- JE = Junior exempt
- JR = Junior Accelerator Programme entrant
- CO = College Accelerator Programme entrant
- NG = Next Gen Accelerator Program entrant
- w/o = Walkover
- r = Retired
- d = Defaulted

=== Finals ===
Semifinals
1	(Japan) Yūichi Sugita	6^{5}	2
5	(Japan) Hiroki Moriya	7^{7}	6
(Poland) Michał Przysiężny	7^{7}	6
7	(Australia) John Millman	6^{3}	2

Final
5	(Japan) Hiroki Moriya	2	3
(Poland) Michał Przysiężny	6	6

=== Top half ===
First round
1	(Japan) Y Sugita	3	7^{7}	6
(United Kingdom) J Baker	6	6^{2}	3
(Japan) Y Uchiyama	7	3	6
(Indonesia) C Rungkat	5	6	3
WC	(Japan) H Kondo	6	6
(South Korea) S-Y Jeong	4	4
(Austria) P Oswald	6^{3}	6	5
6	(Chinese Taipei) T Chen	7^{7}	4	7
4	(Chinese Taipei) J Wang	6^{1}	6	7
(Switzerland) H Laaksonen	7^{7}	2	5
Q	(Republic of Ireland) J McGee	7^{7}	7^{7}
(Chinese Taipei) L-c Huang	6^{5}	6^{4}
(United States) D Zivkovic	1	2
(Australia) B Mitchell	6	6
WC	(Japan) Sho Katayama	3	4
5	(Japan) H Moriya	6	6

Second round
1	(Japan) Y Sugita	6	6
(Japan) Y Uchiyama	4	4
WC	(Japan) H Kondo	6	6
6	(Chinese Taipei) T Chen	4	4
4	(Chinese Taipei) J Wang	6	6
Q	(Republic of Ireland) J McGee	3	1
(Australia) B Mitchell	4	2
5	(Japan) H Moriya	6	6

Quarterfinals
1	(Japan) Y Sugita	6	6
WC	(Japan) H Kondo	2	3
4	(Chinese Taipei) J Wang	6^{4}	2
5	(Japan) H Moriya	7^{7}	6

Semifinals
1	(Japan) Y Sugita	6^{5}	2
5	(Japan) H Moriya	7^{7}	6

=== Bottom half ===
First round
8	(Australia) B Klein	5	7^{7}	3
(Chinese Taipei) T-h Yang	7	6^{2}	6
(Poland) M Przysiężny	5
(Russia) A Kudryavtsev	2^{r}
Q	(Japan) Takuto Niki	7	3	6^{5}
(Australia) M Reid	5	6	7^{7}
WC	(Japan) Hiroyasu Ehara	2	1
3	(Italy) M Viola	6	6
7	(Australia) J Millman	6	7
(Italy) Andrea Arnaboldi	4	5
Q	(France) Julien Obry	2	6	7
(India) P Amritraj	6	3	5
WC	(Japan) T Suzuki	7	3	6^{8}
(Bosnia and Herzegovina) M Bašić	5	6	7^{10}
Q	(Japan) T Matsui	6	6
2	(United States) R Ram	4	3

Second round
(Chinese Taipei) T-h Yang	1	3
(Poland) M Przysiężny	6	6
(Australia) M Reid	3	5
3	(Italy) M Viola	6	7
7	(Australia) J Millman	6	3	6
Q	(France) Julien Obry	1	6	1
(Bosnia and Herzegovina) M Bašić	6^{6}	6	7
Q	(Japan) T Matsui	7^{8}	3	5

Quarterfinals
(Poland) M Przysiężny	6	6
3	(Italy) M Viola	4	4
7	(Australia) J Millman	6	6
(Bosnia and Herzegovina) M Bašić	3	3

Semifinals
(Poland) M Przysiężny	7^{7}	6
7	(Australia) J Millman	6^{3}	2
