= Sebastian Rieschick =

German tennis player

- Country (sports): Germany
- Residence: Berlin, Germany
- Born: 15 February 1986 (age 39); West Berlin, West Germany
- Height: 1.88 m (6 ft 2 in)
- Turned pro: 2004
- Plays: Right-handed (two-handed backhand)
- Prize money: US$175,939

Singles
- Career record: 1–3
- Career titles: 0
- Highest ranking: No. 199 (15 August 2011)

Grand Slam singles results
- Australian Open: Q1 (2006, 2011, 2012)
- French Open: Q2 (2011)
- Wimbledon: Q1 (2011, 2013)
- US Open: Q2 (2011)

Doubles
- Career record: 2–1
- Career titles: 0
- Highest ranking: No. 154 (26 June 2006)
- Last updated on: 17 May 2022.

Sebastian Rieschick (born 15 February 1986 in Berlin) is a German tennis player. He has a career high-ranking of 199 (achieved on 15 August 2011). His coach is Peter Pfannkoch.

== Junior Grand Slam finals ==
=== Doubles: 1 (1 runner-up) ===
Result	Year	Championship	Surface	Partner	Opponents	Score
Loss	2004	US Open	Hard	(Germany) Andreas Beck	(United States) Brendan Evans (United States) Scott Oudsema	6–4, 1–6, 2–6

== ATP Challenger and ITF Futures finals ==
=== Singles: 15 (8–7) ===
Legend ATP Challenger (0–1) ITF Futures (8–6)	Finals by surface Hard (7–5) Clay (1–0) Grass (0–0) Carpet (0–2)

Result	W–L	Date	Tournament	Tier	Surface	Opponent	Score
Loss	0–1	Feb 2005	Germany F5, Mettmann	Futures	Carpet	(Germany) Markus Hantschk	6–1, 3–6, 4–6
Win	1–1	Aug 2005	Germany F10, Ingolstadt	Futures	Clay	(Germany) Sascha Klör	7–6^{(7–4)}, 6–2
Win	2–1	Dec 2005	Israel F3, Ra'anana	Futures	Hard	(Israel) Amir Hadad	6–4, 6–7^{(1–7)}, 6–3
Loss	2–2	Sep 2006	France F12, Bagnères-de-Bigorre	Futures	Hard	(France) Alexandre Sidorenko	6–4, 3–6, 2–6
Win	3–2	Feb 2008	Thailand F2, Laksi	Futures	Hard	(Czech Republic) Roman Jebavý	6–2, 2–0 ret.
Loss	3–3	Mar 2008	Thailand F3, Nonthaburi	Futures	Hard	(China) Yan Bai	7–6^{(7–3)}, 3–6, 0–4 ret.
Loss	3–4	Jul 2008	Turkey F7, Istanbul	Futures	Hard	(Turkey) Marsel Ilhan	3–6, 7–5, 5–7
Loss	3–5	Nov 2008	Israel F5, Ramat HaSharon	Futures	Hard	(Austria) Andreas Haider-Maurer	6–7^{(4–7)}, 4–6
Loss	3–6	Oct 2009	South Africa F1, Pretoria	Futures	Hard	(South Africa) Andrew Anderson	4–6, 2–6
Win	4–6	Aug 2010	Thailand F2, Phitsanulok	Futures	Hard	(Japan) Hiroki Kondo	6–4, 6–1
Win	5–6	Aug 2010	Thailand F3, Nakhon Ratchasima	Futures	Hard	(South Korea) Jeong Suk-Young	6–1, 6–1
Win	6–6	Oct 2010	Kuwait F1, Meshref	Futures	Hard	(Italy) Riccardo Ghedin	6–3, 6–7^{(5–7)}, 6–0
Win	7–6	Nov 2010	Australia F11, Esperance	Futures	Hard	(Australia) Brydan Klein	6–3, 6–4
Win	8–6	Nov 2010	New Zealand F1, Wellington	Futures	Hard	(Australia) Brydan Klein	7–5, 6–3
Loss	8–7	Nov 2011	Toyota, Japan	Challenger	Carpet	(Japan) Tatsuma Ito	4–6, 2–6

=== Doubles: 22 (13–9) ===
Legend ATP Challenger (1–3) ITF Futures (12–6)	Finals by surface Hard (10–5) Clay (3–2) Grass (0–0) Carpet (0–2)

Result	W–L	Date	Tournament	Tier	Surface	Partner	Opponents	Score
Loss	0–1	Jul 2005	Germany F6, Trier	Futures	Clay	(Jamaica) Dustin Brown	(Australia) Rameez Junaid (Germany) Markus Schiller	0–6, 4–6
Loss	0–2	Aug 2005	Germany F10, Ingolstadt	Futures	Clay	(Germany) Dominik Meffert	(Germany) Bastian Knittel (Republic of Ireland) Louk Sorensen	walkover
Win	1–2	Aug 2005	Germany F11, Essen	Futures	Clay	(Germany) Benedikt Stronk	(Lithuania) Vytis Balsiukas (Romania) Adrian-Daniel Simon	6–2, 6–2
Win	2–2	Nov 2005	Sunderland, United Kingdom	Challenger	Hard	(Germany) Frank Moser	(Germany) Christopher Kas (Germany) Philipp Petzschner	6–4, 6–7^{(3–7)} 6–4
Loss	2–3	Mar 2006	Wolfsburg, Germany	Challenger	Carpet	(Germany) Frank Moser	(Switzerland) Jean-Claude Scherrer (Italy) Uros Vico	6–7^{(3–7)}, 7–6^{(7–5)}, [8–10]
Loss	2–4	Jul 2006	Recanati, Italy	Challenger	Hard	(Serbia and Montenegro) Viktor Troicki	(Italy) Simone Bolelli (Italy) Davide Sanguinetti	1–6, 6–3, [4–10]
Loss	2–5	Mar 2007	Ho Chi Minh City, Vietnam	Challenger	Hard	(Chinese Taipei) Jimmy Wang	(China) Yu Xinyuan (China) Zeng Shaoxuan	6–7^{(2–7)}, 3–6
Win	3–5	May 2008	Uzbekistan F2, Namangan	Futures	Hard	(Chinese Taipei) Ti Chen	(Ukraine) Sergei Bubka (Ukraine) Vladyslav Klymenko	7–5, 5–7, [10–5]
Win	4–5	Aug 2008	Germany F16, Wahlstedt	Futures	Clay	(Russia) Dmitri Sitak	(Denmark) Martin Killemose (Germany) Julian Reister	7–5, 6–1
Loss	4–6	Oct 2008	USA F26, Hammond	Futures	Hard	(United States) Levar Harper-Griffith	(United States) Brett Joelson (United States) Bryan Wooten	4–6, 6–4, [8–10]
Loss	4–7	Nov 2008	Israel F5, Ramat Hasharon	Futures	Hard	(Israel) Amir Weintraub	(Canada) Pierre-Ludovic Duclos (Israel) Amir Hadad	3–6, 4–6
Win	5–7	Apr 2009	Turkey F5, Antalya	Futures	Hard	(Denmark) Martin Killemose	(Netherlands) Thomas Schoorel (Netherlands) Antal Van Der Duim	7–5, 6–3
Win	6–7	May 2009	Kuwait F1, Meshref	Futures	Hard	(Finland) Henri Kontinen	(India) Vivek Shokeen (India) Navdeep Singh	6–4, 6–2
Win	7–7	May 2009	Kuwait F2, Meshref	Futures	Hard	(Finland) Henri Kontinen	(Czech Republic) Jiri Krkoska (France) Pierrick Ysern	6–4, 6–4
Win	8–7	Jun 2009	Germany F6, Marburg	Futures	Clay	(Germany) Bastian Knittel	(Russia) Evgeny Kirillov (Russia) Denis Matsukevitch	6–3, 7–6^{(7–2)}
Loss	8–8	Feb 2010	Germany F4, Nussloch	Futures	Carpet	(Germany) Martin Emmrich	(Czech Republic) Roman Jebavy (Czech Republic) Daniel Lustig	3–6, 6–7^{(5–7)}
Win	9–8	Mar 2010	China F2, Mengzi	Futures	Hard	(Solomon Islands) Michael Leong	(Chinese Taipei) Lee Hsin-Han (Chinese Taipei) Yang Tsung-Hua	6–2, 7–5
Win	10–8	Aug 2010	Thailand F1, Nonthaburi	Futures	Hard	(Kuwait) Abdullah Maqdes	(India) Vivek Shokeen (India) Ashutosh Singh	6–3, 7–5
Win	11–8	Aug 2010	Thailand F3, Nakhon Ratchasima	Futures	Hard	(Thailand) Danai Udomchoke	(Thailand) Sonchat Ratiwatana (Thailand) Sanchai Ratiwatana	6–4, 6–4
Win	12–8	Oct 2010	Kuwait F1, Meshref	Futures	Hard	(Croatia) Roko Karanusic	(Switzerland) Luca Margaroli (Belarus) Mikhail Vasiliev	6–1, 6–4
Win	13–8	Oct 2010	Kuwait F2, Meshref	Futures	Hard	(Croatia) Roko Karanusic	(Oman) Mohammed Al Nabhani (United Arab Emirates) Omar Alawadhi	6–2, 6–2
Loss	13–9	Nov 2010	Australia F12, Traralgon	Futures	Hard	(Australia) Sam Groth	(Australia) Colin Ebelthite (Australia) Adam Feeney	3–6, 6–4, [13–15]
