= Gao Wan =

Chinese tennis player

- Country (sports): China
- Born: 24 August 1987 (age 38)
- Prize money: $33,623

Singles
- Career record: 0–1
- Highest ranking: No. 829 (20 Nov 2010)

Doubles
- Career record: 0–2
- Highest ranking: No. 319 (23 Apr 2012)

Gao Wan (高万；born 24 August 1987) is a Chinese former professional tennis player.

Gao was a Chinese Davis Cup representative, featuring in China's win over Indonesia at Jakarta in 2008. He played a dead rubber reverse singles, which he lost to Aditya Hari Sasongko.

On the ATP Tour, Gao appeared in the doubles main draw of two tournaments, including the 2009 Shanghai Masters.

For much of his career he formed a doubles combination on tour with his twin brother Peng. The pair won six ITF Futures events together and were finalists at a Challenger tournament in Japan in 2011.
