= 2009 Dunlop World Challenge – Women's singles =

Women's singles
- 2009 Dunlop World Challenge

Final
- Champion: (Japan) Kimiko Date
- Runner-up: (Serbia) Bojana Jovanovski Petrović
- Score: 7–5, 6–2

Events
Singles	men	women
Doubles	men	women
← 2008 ·	Dunlop World Challenge	· 2010 →

Ayumi Morita, the 2008 champion, tried to defend her title, but was eliminated in the quarterfinals by Bojana Jovanovski Petrovic . Kimiko Date won the tournament after beating Bojana Jovanovski Petrovic 7–5, 6–2 in the final match.

== Seeds ==
1. (Japan) Ayumi Morita (quarterfinals)
2. (Japan) Kimiko Date (champion)
3. (United Kingdom) Elena Baltacha (quarterfinals)
4. (Chinese Taipei) Yung-Jan Chan (semifinals)
5. (Thailand) Tamarine Tanasugarn (quarterfinals)
6. (Australia) Sophie Ferguson (second round)
7. (Japan) Yurika Sema (quarterfinals)
8. (New Zealand) Sacha Hughes (second round)

== Draw ==
=== Key ===
- Q = Qualifier
- WC = Wild card
- LL = Lucky loser
- Alt = Alternate
- ITF = ITF entry
- PR = Protected ranking
- SR = Special ranking
- SE = Special exempt
- JE = Junior exempt
- JR = Junior Accelerator Programme entrant
- CO = College Accelerator Programme entrant
- NG = Next Gen Accelerator Program entrant
- w/o = Walkover
- r = Retired
- d = Defaulted

=== Finals ===
Semifinals
(Serbia) Bojana Jovanovski Petrović	7	4	6
4	(Chinese Taipei) Yung-Jan Chan	6^{5}	6	4
(Japan) Tomoko Yonemura	5	1
2	(Japan) Kimiko Date	7	6

Final
(Serbia) Bojana Jovanovski Petrović	5	2
2	(Japan) Kimiko Date	7	6

=== Top half ===
First round
1	(Japan) A Morita	6	6
(Japan) J Namigata	1	4
Q	(Japan) N Hamamura	7	6
(Japan) E Sema	5	1
(China) Q Wang	2	0
(Serbia) B Jovanovski Petrović	6	6
Q	(Japan) A Omae	1	6^{7}
6	(Australia) S Ferguson	6	7
4	(Chinese Taipei) Y-j Chan	6	6
WC	(Japan) M Tanaka	3	3
Q	(Chinese Taipei) C-w Chan	6	6
WC	(Japan) M Inoue	4	4
Q	(Japan) E Takao	6	7
(Japan) S Hisamatsu	3	6^{8}
(Japan) R Fujiwara	2	2
7	(Japan) Y Sema	6	6

Second round
1	(Japan) A Morita	6	6
Q	(Japan) N Hamamura	4	1
(Serbia) B Jovanovski Petrović	7	6
6	(Australia) S Ferguson	6^{7}	3
4	(Chinese Taipei) Y-j Chan	7	6
Q	(Chinese Taipei) C-w Chan	6^{2}	4
Q	(Japan) E Takao	4	6	3
7	(Japan) Y Sema	6	3	6

Quarterfinals
1	(Japan) A Morita	4	3
(Serbia) B Jovanovski Petrović	6	6
4	(Chinese Taipei) Y-j Chan	6	6
7	(Japan) Y Sema	1	4

Semifinals
(Serbia) B Jovanovski Petrović	7	4	6
4	(Chinese Taipei) Y-j Chan	6^{5}	6	4

=== Bottom half ===
First round
8	(New Zealand) S Hughes	6	6
LL	(Chinese Taipei) Y Chen	3	1
(Japan) T Yonemura	7	6
LL	(Japan) A Yonemura	5	4
(Thailand) S Viratprasert	2	6	6^{5}
(South Korea) S-j Kim	6	2	7
(Japan) M Doi	6^{4}	6	1
3	(United Kingdom) E Baltacha	7	3	6
5	(Thailand) T Tanasugarn	6	6
WC	(Japan) Y Koshino	4	2
WC	(Japan) R Tezuka	7	6
(Japan) A Maekawa	5	2
(Kazakhstan) Z Diyas	6	3	2
(Russia) K Lykina	3	6	6
(New Zealand) M Erakovic	4	2
2	(Japan) K Date	6	6

Second round
8	(New Zealand) S Hughes	6	5	1
(Japan) T Yonemura	4	7	6
(South Korea) S-j Kim	4	3
3	(United Kingdom) E Baltacha	6	6
5	(Thailand) T Tanasugarn	6	6
WC	(Japan) R Tezuka	1	1
(Russia) K Lykina	1	0
2	(Japan) K Date	6	6

Quarterfinals
(Japan) T Yonemura	6	2	6
3	(United Kingdom) E Baltacha	4	6	1
5	(Thailand) T Tanasugarn	1	6	4
2	(Japan) K Date	6	3	6

Semifinals
(Japan) T Yonemura	5	1
2	(Japan) K Date	7	6
