= 2010 Dunlop World Challenge – Men's doubles =

Men's doubles
- 2010 Dunlop World Challenge

Final
- Champion: (Philippines) Treat Conrad Huey; (India) Purav Raja
- Runner-up: (Japan) Hiroki Kondo; (Japan) Tasuku Iwami
- Score: 6–1, 6–2

Events
Singles	men	women
Doubles	men	women
← 2009 ·	Dunlop World Challenge	· 2011 →

Andis Juška and Alexander Kudryavtsev were the defending champions, but decided to not participate this year.
1st seeds Treat Conrad Huey and Purav Raja won this tournament, by defeating Hiroki Kondo and Tasuku Iwami in the final.

== Seeds ==
1. (Philippines) Treat Conrad Huey / (India) Purav Raja (champions)
2. (Australia) Rameez Junaid / (Finland) Juho Paukku (quarterfinals)
3. (Spain) Miguel Ángel López Jaén / (Spain) Pablo Santos (first round)
4. (United States) John Paul Fruttero / (United States) Nicholas Monroe (quarterfinals)

== Draw ==
=== Key ===
- Q = Qualifier
- WC = Wild card
- LL = Lucky loser
- Alt = Alternate
- SE = Special exempt
- PR = Protected ranking
- ITF = ITF entry
- JE = Junior exempt
- w/o = Walkover
- r = Retired
- d = Defaulted
- SR = Special ranking

=== Draw ===
First round

Quarterfinals

Semifinals

Final

1
- (Philippines) TC Huey
- (India) P Raja
6
6

- (India) D Sharan
- (India) V Vardhan
3
4

1
- (Philippines) TC Huey
- (India) P Raja
6
6

- (Japan) Y Matsuo
- (Japan) A Onozawa
6
7

- (Japan) Y Matsuo
- (Japan) A Onozawa
2
3

- (Japan) Y Hasegawa
- (Japan) Y Inoue
0
6^{2}

1
- (Philippines) TC Huey
- (India) P Raja
6
6

4
- (United States) JP Fruttero
- (United States) N Monroe
7
6

- (Japan) Y Ito
- (South Korea) D Yoo
2
2

- (Japan) F Kita
- (Japan) T Niki
6^{2}
3

4
- (United States) JP Fruttero
- (United States) N Monroe
3
6
[8]

- (Austria) N Moser
- (Switzerland) A Sadecky
4
4

- (Japan) Y Ito
- (South Korea) D Yoo
6
4
[10]

- (Japan) Y Ito
- (South Korea) D Yoo
6
6

1
- (Philippines) TC Huey
- (India) P Raja
6
6

- (Japan) H Ehara
- (Japan) S Sekiguchi
7
6

- (Japan) T Iwami
- (Japan) H Kondo
1
2

- (Japan) M Hatanaka
- (Japan) M Shiga
5
2

- (Japan) H Ehara
- (Japan) S Sekiguchi
3
4

- (Japan) H Moriya
- (Japan) B Sato
6
6

- (Japan) H Moriya
- (Japan) B Sato
6
6

3
- (Spain) MÁ López Jaén
- (Spain) P Santos
4
0

- (Japan) H Moriya
- (Japan) B Sato
3
4

- (Japan) T Suzuki
- (Japan) Y Uchiyama
3
6^{2}

- (Japan) T Iwami
- (Japan) H Kondo
6
6

- (Japan) T Iwami
- (Japan) H Kondo
6
7

- (Japan) T Iwami
- (Japan) H Kondo
6^{3}
6
[10]

- (Spain) J Checa Calvo
- (Spain) M Fornell-Mestres
w/o

2
- (Australia) R Junaid
- (Finland) J Paukku
7
4
[7]

2
- (Australia) R Junaid
- (Finland) J Paukku
