= 2010 Dunlop World Challenge – Women's doubles =

Women's doubles
- 2010 Dunlop World Challenge

Final
- Champion: (Japan) Shuko Aoyama (Japan) Rika Fujiwara
- Runner-up: (Romania) Irina-Camelia Begu (Romania) Mădălina Gojnea
- Score: 1–6, 6–3, [11–9]

Events
Singles	men	women
Doubles	men	women
← 2009 ·	Dunlop World Challenge	· 2011 →

Marina Erakovic and Tamarine Tanasugarn were the defending champions; however, they chose not to compete this year.
Shuko Aoyama and Rika Fujiwara won in the final 1–6, 6–3, [11–9], against Irina-Camelia Begu and Mădălina Gojnea.

== Seeds ==
1. (India) ~~Sania Mirza~~ / (Japan) ~~Ayumi Morita~~ (withdrew due to Mirza's injury)
2. (Canada) Marie-Ève Pelletier / (Germany) Kathrin Wörle (semifinals)
3. (United States) Megan Moulton-Levy / (United States) Courtney Nagle (first round)
4. (Turkey) Çağla Büyükakçay / (Russia) Ksenia Lykina (first round)

== Draw ==
=== Key ===
- Q = Qualifier
- WC = Wild card
- LL = Lucky loser
- Alt = Alternate
- SE = Special exempt
- PR = Protected ranking
- ITF = ITF entry
- JE = Junior exempt
- w/o = Walkover
- r = Retired
- d = Defaulted
- SR = Special ranking

=== Draw ===
First round
(Romania) E Bogdan (Thailand) N Lertcheewakarn	6	7
(Japan) K Iijima (Japan) R Tezuka	3	6^{4}
ALT	(Japan) M Kawatoko (Japan) M Miyamura	3	7	[10]
WC	(Japan) K Hisami (Japan) Ma Inoue	6	6^{5}	[7]
3	(United States) M Moulton-Levy (United States) C Nagle	4	6	[9]
(Japan) S Aoyama (Japan) R Fujiwara	6	0	[11]
(Japan) N Hamamura (Chinese Taipei) S-y Kao	7	7
WC	(Japan) Y Nakano (Japan) K Onishi	6^{5}	5
(Japan) Y Sema (Japan) E Takao	2	6^{3}
(Chinese Taipei) C-w Chan (Chinese Taipei) Y Chen	6	7
(Romania) I-C Begu (Romania) M Gojnea	6	6
4	(Turkey) Ç Büyükakçay (Russia) K Lykina	1	4
WC	(Japan) M Doi (Japan) A Nakamura	3	5
(Japan) A Yonemura (Japan) T Yonemura	6	7
(Japan) Ak Inoue (Japan) K Takahata	4	6	[7]
2	(Canada) M-È Pelletier (Germany) K Wörle	6	3	[10]

Quarterfinals
(Romania) E Bogdan (Thailand) N Lertcheewakarn	6	6
ALT	(Japan) M Kawatoko (Japan) M Miyamura	4	3
(Japan) S Aoyama (Japan) R Fujiwara	6	6
(Japan) N Hamamura (Chinese Taipei) S-y Kao	4	2
(Chinese Taipei) C-w Chan (Chinese Taipei) Y Chen	4	3
(Romania) I-C Begu (Romania) M Gojnea	6	6
(Japan) A Yonemura (Japan) T Yonemura	6	0	r
2	(Canada) M-È Pelletier (Germany) K Wörle	4	2

Semifinals
(Romania) E Bogdan (Thailand) N Lertcheewakarn	1	5
(Japan) S Aoyama (Japan) R Fujiwara	6	7
(Romania) I-C Begu (Romania) M Gojnea	6	6
2	(Canada) M-È Pelletier (Germany) K Wörle	4	4

Final
(Japan) S Aoyama (Japan) R Fujiwara	1	6	[11]
(Romania) I-C Begu (Romania) M Gojnea	6	3	[9]
