= 2010 Dunlop World Challenge – Men's singles =

Men's singles
- 2010 Dunlop World Challenge

Final
- Champion: (Japan) Tatsuma Ito
- Runner-up: (Japan) Yūichi Sugita
- Score: 6–4, 6–2

Events
Singles	men	women
Doubles	men	women
← 2009 ·	Dunlop World Challenge	· 2011 →

Uladzimir Ignatik was the defending champion, however chose to not compete this year.
3rd seed Tatsuma Ito won in the final match 6–4, 6–2, against his compatriot, 4th seed Yūichi Sugita.

== Seeds ==
1. (Japan) Go Soeda (semifinals)
2. (Republic of Ireland) Conor Niland (second round)
3. (Japan) Tatsuma Ito (champion)
4. (Japan) Yūichi Sugita (final)
5. (Australia) Bernard Tomic (quarterfinals)
6. (Australia) Greg Jones (first round)
7. (Spain) Pablo Santos (first round)
8. (Chinese Taipei) ~~Yang Tsung-hua~~ (withdrew)

== Draw ==
=== Key ===
- Q = Qualifier
- WC = Wild card
- LL = Lucky loser
- Alt = Alternate
- SE = Special exempt
- PR = Protected ranking
- ITF = ITF entry
- JE = Junior exempt
- w/o = Walkover
- r = Retired
- d = Defaulted
- SR = Special ranking

=== Finals ===
Semifinals
1	(Japan) Go Soeda	6^{11}	2
3	(Japan) Tatsuma Ito	7	6
4	(Japan) Yūichi Sugita	6^{4}	6	6
(Japan) Hiroki Kondo	7	2	3

Final
3	(Japan) Tatsuma Ito	6	6
4	(Japan) Yūichi Sugita	4	2

=== Top half ===
First round
1	(Japan) G Soeda	6	6
LL	(Japan) K Takeuchi	4	4
Q	(Chinese Taipei) Y-t Wang	5	6	6
(South Korea) W-s Jun	7	3	1
(India) V Vardhan	6^{4}	6	3
(South Korea) D Yoo	7	4	6
(Japan) T Suzuki	6^{10}	7	6
6	(Australia) G Jones	7	6^{4}	2
3	(Japan) T Ito	6	6
(Japan) Y Ito	0	3
WC	(Japan) A Onozawa	1	6^{8}
(Japan) H Moriya	6	7
PR	(United States) M McClune	1	5
(United States) N Monroe	6	7
(Austria) N Moser	3	6^{4}
5	(Australia) B Tomic	6	7

Second round
1	(Japan) G Soeda	5	7	6
Q	(Chinese Taipei) Y-t Wang	7	6^{3}	3
(South Korea) D Yoo	4	6	3
(Japan) T Suzuki	6	3	6
3	(Japan) T Ito	6	6
(Japan) H Moriya	1	4
(United States) N Monroe	6^{7}	7	3
5	(Australia) B Tomic	7	6^{5}	6

Quarterfinals
1	(Japan) G Soeda	6	3
(Japan) T Suzuki	1	2	r
3	(Japan) T Ito	7	7
5	(Australia) B Tomic	6^{4}	6^{7}

Semifinals
1	(Japan) G Soeda	6^{11}	2
3	(Japan) T Ito	7	6

=== Bottom half ===
First round
(Australia) R Junaid	2	4
Q	(Japan) T Iwami	6	6
(Spain) J Checa Calvo	3	3
(Switzerland) A Sadecky	6	6
WC	(Japan) H Ehara	6	6
(Spain) M Fornell-Mestres	1	1
(Spain) MÁ López Jaén	1	0
4	(Japan) Y Sugita	6	6
7	(Spain) P Santos	3	4
Q	(Japan) T Matsui	6	6
(Japan) H Kondo	7	7
WC	(Japan) T Niki	6^{3}	4
WC	(Japan) J Mitsuhashi	2	1
(Finland) J Paukku	6	6
Q	(Japan) Y Uchiyama	4	1
2	(Republic of Ireland) C Niland	6	6

Second round
Q	(Japan) T Iwami	6^{3}	7	2
(Switzerland) A Sadecky	7	6^{3}	6
WC	(Japan) H Ehara	5	3
4	(Japan) Y Sugita	7	6
Q	(Japan) T Matsui	4	7	3
(Japan) H Kondo	6	6^{5}	6
(Finland) J Paukku	7	6
2	(Republic of Ireland) C Niland	6^{5}	2

Quarterfinals
(Switzerland) A Sadecky	4	6^{8}
4	(Japan) Y Sugita	6	7
(Japan) H Kondo	6	6
(Finland) J Paukku	3	2

Semifinals
4	(Japan) Y Sugita	6^{4}	6	6
(Japan) H Kondo	7	2	3
