= 2009 Dunlop World Challenge – Men's singles =

Men's singles
- 2009 Dunlop World Challenge

Final
- Champion: (Belarus) Uladzimir Ignatik
- Runner-up: (Japan) Tatsuma Ito
- Score: 7–6(7), 7–6(3)

Events
| Singles | men | women |
| Doubles | men | women |
| ← 2008 · | Dunlop World Challenge | · 2010 → |

Go Soeda, the 2008 champion, tried to defend his title, but retired due to fatigue in the first round match against Yuichi Ito. Uladzimir Ignatik won the tournament after beating Tatsuma Ito 7–6(7), 7–6(3) in the final match.

== Seeds ==
1. (Japan) Go Soeda (first round, retired due to fatigue)
2. (South Korea) Im Kyu-tae (first round)
3. (Germany) Dieter Kindlmann (first round)
4. (Russia) Alexander Kudryavtsev (second round)
5. (Japan) Tatsuma Ito (final)
6. (Austria) Philipp Oswald (quarterfinals)
7. (Slovakia) Pavol Červenák (first round)
8. (Australia) Nick Lindahl (first round)

== Draw ==
=== Key ===
- Q = Qualifier
- WC = Wild card
- LL = Lucky loser
- Alt = Alternate
- ITF = ITF entry
- PR = Protected ranking
- SR = Special ranking
- SE = Special exempt
- JE = Junior exempt
- JR = Junior Accelerator Programme entrant
- CO = College Accelerator Programme entrant
- NG = Next Gen Accelerator Program entrant
- w/o = Walkover
- r = Retired
- d = Defaulted

=== Finals ===
Semifinals
5 | (Japan) Tatsuma Ito | 6 | 6
(Germany) Simon Stadler | 4 | 4
(Austria) Martin Fischer | 6 | 6^{4} | 3
(Belarus) Uladzimir Ignatik | 2 | 7 | 6

Final
5 | (Japan) Tatsuma Ito | 6^{7} | 6^{3}
(Belarus) Uladzimir Ignatik | 7 | 7

=== Top half ===
First round
1 | (Japan) G Soeda | 4 | r
Q | (Japan) Y Ito | 6
(Kazakhstan) A Kedryuk | 0 | 0
(Japan) Junn Mitsuhashi | 6 | 6
(Croatia) N Mektić | 4 | 4
Q | (Japan) T Iwami | 6 | 6
WC | (Japan) Hiroki Moriya | 6 | 2 | 4
5 | (Japan) T Ito | 2 | 6 | 6
3 | (Germany) D Kindlmann | 4 | 6 | 3
(Germany) S Stadler | 6 | 3 | 6
WC | (Japan) Kento Takeuchi | 6 | 6^{4} | 7
Q | (Chinese Taipei) T Chen | 4 | 7 | 6^{1}
(New Zealand) J Statham | 6^{4} | 6 | 5
(Montenegro) G Tošić | 7 | 1 | 7
WC | (Japan) Arata Onozawa | 2 | 6^{5}
6 | (Austria) P Oswald | 6 | 7

Second round
Q | (Japan) Y Ito | 3 | 7 | 4
(Japan) J Mitsuhashi | 6 | 6^{0} | 6
Q | (Japan) T Iwami | 6 | 1 | 2
5 | (Japan) T Ito | 4 | 6 | 6
(Germany) S Stadler | 6 | 6
WC | (Japan) K Takeuchi | 2 | 1
(Montenegro) G Tošić | 7 | 4 | 4
6 | (Austria) P Oswald | 6^{7} | 6 | 6

Quarterfinals
(Japan) J Mitsuhashi | 2 | 2
5 | (Japan) T Ito | 6 | 6
(Germany) S Stadler | 6 | 3 | 6
6 | (Austria) P Oswald | 4 | 6 | 3

Semifinals
5 | (Japan) T Ito | 6 | 6
(Germany) S Stadler | 4 | 4

=== Bottom half ===
First round
7 | (Slovakia) P Červenák | 6^{5} | 6^{4}
(Australia) G Jones | 7 | 7
(Latvia) A Juška | 6 | 5 | 7
(Switzerland) A Sadecky | 2 | 7 | 6^{2}
Q | (South Korea) W-s Jun | 4 | 3
(Austria) M Fischer | 6 | 6
(Australia) S Kadir | 4 | 3
4 | (Russia) A Kudryavtsev | 6 | 6
8 | (Australia) N Lindahl | 4 | 6^{2}
(Japan) T Suzuki | 6 | 7
(Japan) Y Sugita | 6 | 6
(South Korea) D Yoo | 4 | 3
(Netherlands) J Huta Galung | 7 | 6
WC | (Japan) H Kondo | 6^{5} | 3
(Belarus) U Ignatik | 7 | 6
2 | (South Korea) K-t Im | 6^{5} | 3

Second round
(Australia) G Jones | 4 | 7 | 7
(Latvia) A Juška | 6 | 6^{5} | 5
(Austria) M Fischer | 4 | 6 | 6
4 | (Russia) A Kudryavtsev | 6 | 3 | 2
(Japan) T Suzuki | 2 | r
(Japan) Y Sugita | 6
(Netherlands) J Huta Galung | 3 | 2
(Belarus) U Ignatik | 6 | 6

Quarterfinals
(Australia) G Jones | 3 | 6 | 4
(Austria) M Fischer | 6 | 2 | 6
(Japan) Y Sugita | 4 | 6^{5}
(Belarus) U Ignatik | 6 | 7

Semifinals
(Austria) M Fischer | 6 | 6^{4} | 3
(Belarus) U Ignatik | 2 | 7 | 6
