= 2016 Dunlop World Challenge – Men's singles =

Men's singles
- 2016 Dunlop World Challenge

Final
- Champion: (Australia) James Duckworth
- Runner-up: (Japan) Tatsuma Ito
- Score: 7–5, 4–6, 6–1

Events
Singles	men	women
Doubles	men	women
← 2015 ·	Dunlop World Challenge	· 2017 →

Yoshihito Nishioka was the defending champion but lost in the quarterfinals to James Duckworth.

Duckworth won the title after defeating Tatsuma Ito 7–5, 4–6, 6–1 in the final.

== Seeds ==
1. (Japan) Yoshihito Nishioka (quarterfinals)
2. (Japan) Yūichi Sugita (second round)
3. (Japan) Go Soeda (second round)
4. (South Korea) Chung Hyeon (second round)
5. (Australia) James Duckworth (champion)
6. (South Korea) Lee Duck-hee (second round)
7. (Japan) Tatsuma Ito (final)
8. (Japan) Hiroki Moriya (second round)

== Draw ==
=== Key ===
- Q = Qualifier
- WC = Wild card
- LL = Lucky loser
- Alt = Alternate
- ITF = ITF entry
- PR = Protected ranking
- SR = Special ranking
- SE = Special exempt
- JE = Junior exempt
- JR = Junior Accelerator Programme entrant
- CO = College Accelerator Programme entrant
- NG = Next Gen Accelerator Program entrant
- w/o = Walkover
- r = Retired
- d = Defaulted

=== Finals ===
Semifinals
5	(Australia) James Duckworth	6	7^{7}
(Germany) Daniel Masur	3	6^{3}
(Australia) Luke Saville	7^{7}	3	4
7	(Japan) Tatsuma Ito	6^{5}	6	6

Final
5	(Australia) James Duckworth	7	4	6
7	(Japan) Tatsuma Ito	5	6	1

=== Top half ===
First round
1	(Japan) Y Nishioka	6	6
(South Korea) S-c Hong	3	3
(France) L Lokoli	6^{4}	5
(Australia) J-P Smith	7^{7}	7
(Israel) A Weintraub	6^{2}	2
(Japan) Yuya Kibi	7^{7}	6
(France) A Michon	3	4
5	(Australia) J Duckworth	6	6
4	(South Korea) H Chung	6	6
(Japan) Shuichi Sekiguchi	1	3
WC	(Japan) Y Takahashi	6	7
(Japan) Y Uchiyama	3	5
(Germany) D Masur	2	6	6
(Chinese Taipei) T Chen	6	4	4
(Japan) T Niki	4	4
8	(Japan) H Moriya	6	6

Second round
1	(Japan) Y Nishioka	6	6
(Australia) J-P Smith	4	4
(Japan) Y Kibi	4	4
5	(Australia) J Duckworth	6	6
4	(South Korea) H Chung	5	3
WC	(Japan) Y Takahashi	7	6
(Germany) D Masur	6	6
8	(Japan) H Moriya	2	3

Quarterfinals
1	(Japan) Y Nishioka	3	2
5	(Australia) J Duckworth	6	6
WC	(Japan) Y Takahashi	6	4	5
(Germany) D Masur	4	6	7

Semifinals
5	(Australia) J Duckworth	6	7^{7}
(Germany) D Masur	3	6^{3}

=== Bottom half ===
First round
6	(South Korea) D-h Lee	7^{7}	4	7
Q	(Poland) M Przysiężny	6^{3}	6	5
WC	(Japan) Makoto Ochi	1	1
(Australia) L Saville	6	6
Q	(South Korea) Y-k Lim	6	2	6
(South Korea) S-w Kwon	4	6	1
(South Korea) Kim Cheong-eui	3	1
3	(Japan) G Soeda	6	6
7	(Japan) T Ito	7^{7}	6
WC	(Japan) Yu Watanuki	6^{2}	2
WC	(Japan) Yo Watanuki	6	6
(Croatia) A Pavić	3	3
(Israel) E Leshem	3	3
Q	(Belarus) Y Shyla	6	6
Q	(Japan) K Takeuchi	5	3
2	(Japan) Y Sugita	7	6

Second round
6	(South Korea) D-h Lee	3	6	3
(Australia) L Saville	6	3	6
Q	(South Korea) Y-k Lim	6	4	7
3	(Japan) G Soeda	4	6	5
7	(Japan) T Ito	6	6
WC	(Japan) Yo Watanuki	4	4
Q	(Belarus) Y Shyla	6^{6}	6	6
2	(Japan) Y Sugita	7^{8}	4	4

Quarterfinals
(Australia) L Saville	6	6
Q	(South Korea) Y-k Lim	4	0
7	(Japan) T Ito	6	6
Q	(Belarus) Y Shyla	4	3

Semifinals
(Australia) L Saville	7^{7}	3	4
7	(Japan) T Ito	6^{5}	6	6
