= 2016 Dunlop World Challenge – Men's doubles =

Men's doubles
- 2016 Dunlop World Challenge

Final
- Champions: (Australia) Matt Reid (Australia) John-Patrick Smith
- Runners-up: (India) Jeevan Nedunchezhiyan (Indonesia) Christopher Rungkat
- Score: 6–3, 6–4

Events
Singles	men	women
Doubles	men	women
← 2015 ·	Dunlop World Challenge	· 2017 →

Brydan Klein and Matt Reid were the defending champions but only Reid defended his title, partnering John-Patrick Smith.

Reid successfully defended his title, defeating Jeevan Nedunchezhiyan and Christopher Rungkat 6–3, 6–4 in the final.

== Seeds ==
1. (Australia) Matt Reid / (Australia) John-Patrick Smith (champions)
2. (Thailand) Sonchat Ratiwatana / (Chinese Taipei) Yi Chu-huan (semifinals)
3. (India) Jeevan Nedunchezhiyan / (Indonesia) Christopher Rungkat (final)
4. (Belarus) Sergey Betov / (Belarus) Yaraslav Shyla (first round)

== Draw ==
=== Key ===
- Q = Qualifier
- WC = Wild card
- LL = Lucky loser
- Alt = Alternate
- ITF = ITF entry
- PR = Protected ranking
- SR = Special ranking
- SE = Special exempt
- JE = Junior exempt
- JR = Junior Accelerator Programme entrant
- CO = College Accelerator Programme entrant
- NG = Next Gen Accelerator Program entrant
- w/o = Walkover
- r = Retired
- d = Defaulted

First round
1	(Australia) M Reid (Australia) J-P Smith	6	6
(Chinese Taipei) K-y Lee (Israel) E Leshem	2	4
(Chinese Taipei) T Chen (Israel) A Weintraub	6	6
(Japan) Yuya Kibi (Japan) Shuichi Sekiguchi	4	2
4	(Belarus) S Betov (Belarus) Y Shyla	5	6	[8]
WC	(Japan) H Kondo (Japan) T Suzuki	7	4	[10]
(Philippines) R Gonzales (Japan) T Matsui	6^{6}	6	[3]
(Japan) T Ito (Germany) P Petzschner	7^{8}	2	[10]
(France) L Lokoli (Australia) L Saville	7^{7}	6
(Germany) D Masur (Croatia) A Pavić	6^{4}	3
(Chinese Taipei) J-c Hung (South Korea) Kim Cheong-eui	2	7^{8}	[5]
3	(India) J Nedunchezhiyan (Indonesia) C Rungkat	6	6^{6}	[10]
WC	(Japan) Sho Katayama (Japan) Arata Onozawa	6	2	[5]
(South Korea) S-w Kwon (South Korea) Y-k Lim	4	6	[10]
WC	(Japan) Yo Watanuki (Japan) Yu Watanuki	3	4
2	(Thailand) So Ratiwatana (Chinese Taipei) C-h Yi	6	6

Quarterfinals
1	(Australia) M Reid (Australia) J-P Smith	7^{7}	7^{7}
(Chinese Taipei) T Chen (Israel) A Weintraub	6^{5}	6^{3}
WC	(Japan) H Kondo (Japan) T Suzuki	6^{4}	6	[10]
(Japan) T Ito (Germany) P Petzschner	7^{7}	3	[8]
(France) L Lokoli (Australia) L Saville
3	(India) J Nedunchezhiyan (Indonesia) C Rungkat	w/o
(South Korea) S-w Kwon (South Korea) Y-k Lim	4	3
2	(Thailand) So Ratiwatana (Chinese Taipei) C-h Yi	6	6

Semifinals
1	(Australia) M Reid (Australia) J-P Smith	6	6
WC	(Japan) H Kondo (Japan) T Suzuki	0	4
3	(India) J Nedunchezhiyan (Indonesia) C Rungkat	6	7^{7}
2	(Thailand) So Ratiwatana (Chinese Taipei) C-h Yi	3	6^{1}

Final
1	(Australia) M Reid (Australia) J-P Smith	6	6
3	(India) J Nedunchezhiyan (Indonesia) C Rungkat	3	4
