= 2017 Dunlop World Challenge – Women's singles =

Women's singles
- 2017 Dunlop World Challenge

Final
- Champion: (Romania) Mihaela Buzărnescu
- Runner-up: (Slovenia) Tamara Zidanšek
- Score: 6–0, 6–1

Events
Singles	men	women
Doubles	men	women
← 2016 ·	Dunlop World Challenge

Aryna Sabalenka was the defending champion, but chose to participate in Taipei instead.

Mihaela Buzărnescu won the title, defeating Tamara Zidanšek in the final, 6–0, 6–1.

== Seeds ==
1. (Romania) Mihaela Buzărnescu (champion)
2. (Hungary) Dalma Gálfi (quarterfinals)
3. (Slovenia) Tamara Zidanšek (final)
4. (Italy) Georgia Brescia (first round; retired)
5. (China) Lu Jiajing (semifinals)
6. (Japan) Miharu Imanishi (quarterfinals)
7. (Japan) Mayo Hibi (first round)
8. (Japan) Junri Namigata (semifinals)

== Draw ==
=== Key ===
- Q = Qualifier
- WC = Wild card
- LL = Lucky loser
- Alt = Alternate
- SE = Special exempt
- PR = Protected ranking
- ITF = ITF entry
- JE = Junior exempt
- w/o = Walkover
- r = Retired
- d = Defaulted
- SR = Special ranking

=== Finals ===
Semifinals
1	(Romania) Mihaela Buzărnescu	6	7
5	(China) Lu Jiajing	1	5
3	(Slovenia) Tamara Zidanšek	6	6
8	(Japan) Junri Namigata	1	1

Final
1	(Romania) Mihaela Buzărnescu	6	6
3	(Slovenia) Tamara Zidanšek	0	1

=== Top half ===
First round
1	(Romania) M Buzărnescu	7	6
(United States) E Bektas	5	2
Q	(Japan) K Okamura	6^{2}	5
(Japan) R Sawayanagi	7^{7}	7
(Japan) H Kaji	3	6	7^{7}
(France) A Lim	6	3	6^{2}
Q	(Japan) R Fujiwara	6	6
7	(Japan) M Hibi	0	2
4	(Italy) G Brescia	1	0^{r}
(United Kingdom) K Dunne	6	0
(United Kingdom) L Robson	6	6
WC	(Japan) Y Tanaka	3	1
(Japan) A Shimizu	6	6
(Thailand) Vara Wongteanchai	2	3
Q	(Japan) A Yoshitomi	1	5
5	(China) Jia Lu	6	7

Second round
1	(Romania) M Buzărnescu	6	6
(Japan) R Sawayanagi	2	1
(Japan) H Kaji	7^{7}	6
Q	(Japan) R Fujiwara	6^{1}	2
(United Kingdom) K Dunne	1	3
(United Kingdom) L Robson	6	6
(Japan) A Shimizu	4	4
5	(China) Jia Lu	6	6

Quarterfinals
1	(Romania) M Buzărnescu	6	6
(Japan) H Kaji	3	3
(United Kingdom) L Robson	1	7^{7}	4
5	(China) Jia Lu	6	6^{3}	6

Semifinals
1	(Romania) M Buzărnescu	6	7
5	(China) Jia Lu	1	5

=== Bottom half ===
First round
6	(Japan) M Imanishi	6	6
(Japan) S Aoyama	1	2
(India) A Raina	2	6	6
Q	(Japan) M Nishimoto	6	1	1
(Thailand) P Plipuech	6	1	1
(Japan) E Sema	3	6	6
WC	(Japan) Y Hosoki	3	0
3	(Slovenia) T Zidanšek	6	6
8	(Japan) J Namigata	6	6
(Japan) M Minokoshi	0	0
(Hungary) Á Bukta	1	5
WC	(Japan) M Kobori	6	7
(Russia) K Lykina	6	6
(Serbia) D Radanović	3	2
WC	(Poland) U Radwańska	4	7^{7}	2
2	(Hungary) D Gálfi	6	6^{1}	6

Second round
6	(Japan) M Imanishi	6	6
(India) A Raina	3	2
(Japan) E Sema	5	3
3	(Slovenia) T Zidanšek	7	6
8	(Japan) J Namigata	6	6
WC	(Japan) M Kobori	4	3
(Russia) K Lykina	5	3
2	(Hungary) D Gálfi	7	6

Quarterfinals
6	(Japan) M Imanishi	3	2
3	(Slovenia) T Zidanšek	6	6
8	(Japan) J Namigata	4	7^{7}	6
2	(Hungary) D Gálfi	6	6^{1}	3

Semifinals
3	(Slovenia) T Zidanšek	6	6
8	(Japan) J Namigata	1	1
