= 2017 Dunlop World Challenge – Men's singles =

Men's singles
- 2017 Dunlop World Challenge

Final
- Champion: (Australia) Matthew Ebden
- Runner-up: (France) Calvin Hemery
- Score: 7–6^{(7–3)}, 6–3

Events
Singles	men	women
Doubles	men	women
← 2016 ·	Dunlop World Challenge

James Duckworth was the defending champion but chose not to defend his title.

Matthew Ebden won the title after defeating Calvin Hemery 7–6^{(7–3)}, 6–3 in the final.

== Seeds ==
1. (Japan) Taro Daniel (first round)
2. (Australia) Matthew Ebden (champion)
3. (Japan) Tatsuma Ito (quarterfinals, retired)
4. (Japan) Go Soeda (second round)
5. (Australia) John Millman (semifinals)
6. (South Korea) Kwon Soon-woo (second round)
7. (France) Calvin Hemery (final)
8. (South Korea) Lee Duck-hee (quarterfinals)

== Draw ==
=== Key ===
- Q = Qualifier
- WC = Wild card
- LL = Lucky loser
- Alt = Alternate
- SE = Special exempt
- PR = Protected ranking
- ITF = ITF entry
- JE = Junior exempt
- w/o = Walkover
- r = Retired
- d = Defaulted
- SR = Special ranking

=== Finals ===
Semifinals
7	(France) Calvin Hemery	7^{7}	6^{4}	6
5	(Australia) John Millman	6^{4}	7^{7}	2
(Poland) Hubert Hurkacz	6	4	6^{2}
2	(Australia) Matthew Ebden	4	6	7^{7}

Final
7	(France) Calvin Hemery	6^{3}	3
2	(Australia) Matthew Ebden	7^{7}	6

=== Top half ===
First round
1	(Japan) T Daniel	3	6^{4}
WC	(Japan) Shintaro Imai	6	7^{7}
(Australia) A Whittington	6	6
(Japan) H Moriya	3	4
(Australia) O Jasika	6	4	4
(Australia) B Mousley	4	6	6
(Australia) A Bolt	4	6^{4}
7	(France) C Hemery	6	7^{7}
4	(Japan) G Soeda	7^{7}	6
(Israel) E Leshem	6^{1}	4
(Chinese Taipei) J Jung	4	6	2
(Australia) M Purcell	6	3	6
(Japan) Yo Watanuki	4	4
(Japan) Y Uchiyama	6	6
WC	(Japan) Yuga Tashiro	3	2
5	(Australia) J Millman	6	6

Second round
WC	(Japan) S Imai	3	3
(Australia) A Whittington	6	6
(Australia) B Mousley	6^{3}	1
7	(France) C Hemery	7^{7}	6
4	(Japan) G Soeda	2	6^{6}
(Australia) M Purcell	6	7^{8}
(Japan) Y Uchiyama	6^{5}	7^{13}	6^{9}
5	(Australia) J Millman	7^{7}	6^{11}	7^{11}

Quarterfinals
(Australia) A Whittington	6	3	5
7	(France) C Hemery	3	6	7
(Australia) M Purcell	5	2
5	(Australia) J Millman	7	6

Semifinals
7	(France) C Hemery	7^{7}	6^{4}	6
5	(Australia) J Millman	6^{4}	7^{7}	2

=== Bottom half ===
First round
6	(South Korea) S-w Kwon	7^{7}	6
(United States) A Krajicek	6^{1}	4
(Poland) H Hurkacz	6	6
Q	(Japan) K Uesugi	3	0
Q	(Japan) K Takeuchi	4	4
Q	(Japan) Hiroyasu Ehara	6	6
(France) S Robert	3	7	2
3	(Japan) T Ito	6	5	6
8	(South Korea) D-h Lee	6	6
Q	(Japan) Yuya Kibi	3	4
(China) Z Li	7	6
(Russia) T Gabashvili	5	2
WC	(Japan) Jumpei Yamasaki	3	2
WC	(Japan) Y Shimizu	6	6
(Japan) Y Takahashi	1	6^{6}
2	(Australia) M Ebden	6	7^{8}

Second round
6	(South Korea) S-w Kwon	7^{7}	4	5
(Poland) H Hurkacz	6^{5}	6	7
Q	(Japan) H Ehara	2	1
3	(Japan) T Ito	6	6
8	(South Korea) D-h Lee	6	6
(China) Z Li	3	3
WC	(Japan) Y Shimizu	3	2
2	(Australia) M Ebden	6	6

Quarterfinals
(Poland) H Hurkacz	6	4
3	(Japan) T Ito	0	0^{r}
8	(South Korea) D-h Lee	3	0
2	(Australia) M Ebden	6	6

Semifinals
(Poland) H Hurkacz	6	4	6^{2}
2	(Australia) M Ebden	4	6	7^{7}
