= 2009 Dunlop World Challenge – Men's doubles =

Men's doubles
- 2009 Dunlop World Challenge

Final
- Champion: (Latvia) Andis Juška; (Russia) Alexander Kudryavtsev
- Runner-up: (Kazakhstan) Alexey Kedryuk (Japan) Junn Mitsuhashi
- Score: 6–4, 7–6(6)

Events
Singles	men	women
Doubles	men	women
← 2008 ·	Dunlop World Challenge	· 2010 →

Frederik Nielsen and Aisam-ul-Haq Qureshi, who were the defending champions, chose to not play this year.
Andis Juška and Alexander Kudryavtsev defeated Alexey Kedryuk and Junn Mitsuhashi 6–4, 7–6(6) in the final.

== Seeds ==
1. (Austria) Martin Fischer / (Austria) Philipp Oswald (quarterfinals)
2. (Latvia) Andis Juška / (Russia) Alexander Kudryavtsev (champions)
3. (Kazakhstan) Alexey Kedryuk / (Japan) Junn Mitsuhashi (final)
4. (Japan) Hiroki Kondo / (Japan) Takao Suzuki (semifinals)

== Draw ==
=== Key ===
- Q = Qualifier
- WC = Wild card
- LL = Lucky loser
- Alt = Alternate
- ITF = ITF entry
- PR = Protected ranking
- SR = Special ranking
- SE = Special exempt
- JE = Junior exempt
- JR = Junior Accelerator Programme entrant
- CO = College Accelerator Programme entrant
- NG = Next Gen Accelerator Program entrant
- w/o = Walkover
- r = Retired
- d = Defaulted

=== Finals ===
Semifinals

Final

- (Belarus) U Ignatik
- (Australia) G Jones
5
6
[6]

3
(Kazakhstan) A Kedryuk
(Japan) Junn Mitsuhashi
7
2
[10]

3
(Kazakhstan) A Kedryuk
(Japan) J Mitsuhashi
4
6^{6}

2
- (Latvia) A Juška
- (Russia) A Kudryavtsev
6
7

4
- (Japan) H Kondo
- (Japan) T Suzuki
4
3

2
- (Latvia) A Juška
- (Russia) A Kudryavtsev
6
6
