= 2017 Dunlop World Challenge =

- Date: 13–19 November
- Edition: 10th
- Category: ATP Challenger Tour; ITF Women's Circuit
- Surface: Hard (indoor)
- Location: Toyota, Japan

Champions

Men's singles
- (Australia) Matthew Ebden

Women's singles
- (Romania) Mihaela Buzărnescu

Men's doubles
- (Australia) Max Purcell / (Australia) Andrew Whittington

Women's doubles
- (Russia) Ksenia Lykina / (Japan) Junri Namigata
← 2016 ·	Dunlop World Challenge

The 2017 Dunlop Srixon World Challenge was a professional tennis tournament played on indoor hard courts. It was the 10th edition of the tournament and part of the 2017 ATP Challenger Tour and the 2017 ITF Women's Circuit. It took place in Toyota, Japan, between 13–19 November 2017 and was the last edition of the tournament.

== Men's singles main draw entrants ==
=== Seeds ===
Country	Player	Rank^{1}	Seed
JPN	Taro Daniel	96	1
AUS	Matthew Ebden	100	2
JPN	Tatsuma Ito	151	3
JPN	Go Soeda	160	4
AUS	John Millman	185	5
KOR	Kwon Soon-woo	189	6
FRA	Calvin Hemery	190	7
KOR	Lee Duck-hee	201	8

- ^{1} Rankings as of 6 November 2017.

=== Other entrants ===
The following players received wildcards into the singles main draw:

- (Japan) Shintaro Imai
- (Japan) Yuta Shimizu
- (Japan) Yuga Tashiro
- (Japan) Jumpei Yamasaki

The following players received entry from the qualifying draw:

- (Japan) Hiroyasu Ehara
- (Japan) Yuya Kibi
- (Japan) Kento Takeuchi
- (Japan) Kaito Uesugi

== Women's singles main draw entrants ==
=== Seeds ===
Country	Player	Rank^{1}	Seed
ROU	Mihaela Buzărnescu	72	1
HUN	Dalma Gálfi	170	2
SLO	Tamara Zidanšek	180	3
ITA	Georgia Brescia	218	4
CHN	Lu Jiajing	225	5
JPN	Miharu Imanishi	226	6
JPN	Mayo Hibi	235	7
JPN	Junri Namigata	236	8

- ^{1} Rankings as of 6 November 2017.

=== Other entrants ===
The following players received wildcards into the singles main draw:

- (Japan) Yuka Hosoki
- (Japan) Momoko Kobori
- (Poland) Urszula Radwańska
- (Japan) Yuuki Tanaka

The following players received entry from the qualifying draw:

- (Japan) Rika Fujiwara
- (Japan) Megumi Nishimoto
- (Japan) Kyōka Okamura
- (Japan) Aiko Yoshitomi

== Champions ==
=== Men's singles ===
- (Australia) Matthew Ebden def. (France) Calvin Hemery, 7–6^{(7–3)}, 6–3.

=== Women's singles ===
- (Romania) Mihaela Buzărnescu def. (Slovenia) Tamara Zidanšek, 6–0, 6–1

=== Men's doubles ===
- (Australia) Max Purcell / (Australia) Andrew Whittington def. (Philippines) Ruben Gonzales / (Indonesia) Christopher Rungkat 6–3, 2–6, [10–8].

=== Women's doubles ===
- (Russia) Ksenia Lykina / (Japan) Junri Namigata def. (Thailand) Nicha Lertpitaksinchai / (Thailand) Peangtarn Plipuech 3–6, 6–3, [10–4].
