= 2016 Dunlop World Challenge – Women's singles =

Women's singles
- 2016 Dunlop World Challenge

Final
- Champion: (Belarus) Aryna Sabalenka
- Runner-up: (Australia) Lizette Cabrera
- Score: 6–2, 6–4

Events
Singles	men	women
Doubles	men	women
← 2015 ·	Dunlop World Challenge	· 2017 →

Jana Fett was the defending champion, but lost to Lizette Cabrera in the quarterfinals.

Aryna Sabalenka won the title, defeating Cabrera in the final, 6–2, 6–4.

== Seeds ==
1. (Japan) Kurumi Nara (second round)
2. (Belarus) Aryna Sabalenka (champion)
3. (Russia) Ksenia Lykina (second round)
4. (Uzbekistan) Nigina Abduraimova (second round)
5. (Croatia) Jana Fett (quarterfinals)
6. (United States) Jamie Loeb (first round)
7. (Japan) Mayo Hibi (first round)
8. (Japan) Shuko Aoyama (first round)

== Main draw ==
=== Key ===
- Q = Qualifier
- WC = Wild card
- LL = Lucky loser
- Alt = Alternate
- SE = Special exempt
- PR = Protected ranking
- ITF = ITF entry
- JE = Junior exempt
- w/o = Walkover
- r = Retired
- d = Defaulted
- SR = Special ranking

=== Finals ===
Semifinals
(Australia) Lizette Cabrera	2	6	6
(Japan) Shiho Akita	6	2	3
(Hungary) Dalma Gálfi
2	(Belarus) Aryna Sabalenka	w/o

Final
(Australia) Lizette Cabrera	2	4
2	(Belarus) Aryna Sabalenka	6	6

=== Top half ===
First round
1	(Japan) K Nara	6	6
Q	(Japan) C Muramatsu	3	1
(Australia) L Cabrera	6	7^{7}
WC	(Japan) R Ueda	2	6^{5}
(Belgium) A-S Mestach	6	6
WC	(Japan) M Ozeki	1	3
Q	(South Korea) N-r Kim	4	6	2
5	(Croatia) J Fett	6	4	6
3	(Russia) K Lykina	6	3	6
Q	(Japan) M Imanishi	2	6	1
(Japan) S Akita	0	6	6
(Montenegro) A Veselinović	6	4	3
(South Korea) J-h Choi	3	3
(Poland) M Fręch	6	6
(Japan) M Ayukawa	6	6
8	(Japan) S Aoyama	3	3

Second round
1	(Japan) K Nara	2	7^{7}	1
(Australia) L Cabrera	6	6^{1}	6
(Belgium) A-S Mestach	6	2	2
5	(Croatia) J Fett	2	6	6
3	(Russia) K Lykina	5	6	2
(Japan) S Akita	7	1	6
(Poland) M Fręch	6	6
(Japan) M Ayukawa	4	3

Quarterfinals
(Australia) L Cabrera	7^{7}	6
5	(Croatia) J Fett	6^{3}	1
(Japan) S Akita	6	3	6
(Poland) M Fręch	3	6	4

Semifinals
(Australia) L Cabrera	2	6	6
(Japan) S Akita	6	2	3

=== Bottom half ===
First round
6	(United States) J Loeb	5	6	4
(Japan) M Ninomiya	7	4	6
WC	(Japan) H Kaji	7	2	4
(Japan) E Sema	5	6	6
(Hungary) D Gálfi	6	6
(Japan) A Okuno	1	2
(Japan) A Omae	5	7	6^{2}
4	(Uzbekistan) N Abduraimova	7	5	7^{7}
7	(Japan) M Hibi	6	1	4
(Japan) A Shimizu	2	6	6
(South Korea) S-n Jeong	3	2
(Japan) Y Tanaka	6	6
Q	(United States) T Kinard	1	2
(Switzerland) P Schnyder	6	6
WC	(Japan) M Kobori	0	1
2	(Belarus) A Sabalenka	6	6

Second round
(Japan) M Ninomiya	6	6
(Japan) E Sema	2	3
(Hungary) D Gálfi	6	4	7^{7}
4	(Uzbekistan) N Abduraimova	3	6	6^{4}
(Japan) A Shimizu	6^{5}	6	6
(Japan) Y Tanaka	7^{7}	3	3
(Switzerland) P Schnyder	5	4
2	(Belarus) A Sabalenka	7	6

Quarterfinals
(Japan) M Ninomiya	3	2
(Hungary) D Gálfi	6	6
(Japan) A Shimizu	3	0
2	(Belarus) A Sabalenka	6	6

Semifinals
(Hungary) D Gálfi
2	(Belarus) A Sabalenka	w/o
