= 2015 Dunlop World Challenge – Women's doubles =

Women's doubles
- 2015 Dunlop World Challenge

Final
- Champions: (Japan) Akiko Omae (Thailand) Peangtarn Plipuech
- Runners-up: (Thailand) Luksika Kumkhum (Japan) Yuuki Tanaka
- Score: 3–6, 6–0, [11–9]

Events
Singles	men	women
Doubles	men	women
← 2014 ·	Dunlop World Challenge	· 2016 →

Eri Hozumi and Makoto Ninomiya were the defending champions, but both players chose to participate with different partners.

Akiko Omae and Peangtarn Plipuech won the title, defeating Luksika Kumkhum and Yuuki Tanaka in the final, 3–6, 6–0, [11–9].

== Seeds ==
1. (Japan) Shuko Aoyama / (Japan) Makoto Ninomiya (quarterfinals)
2. (Japan) Nao Hibino / (Japan) Eri Hozumi (semifinals)
3. (Japan) Hiroko Kuwata / (Japan) Junri Namigata (quarterfinals)
4. (Russia) Ksenia Lykina / (Georgia (country)) Sofia Shapatava (first round)

== Draw ==
=== Key ===
- Q = Qualifier
- WC = Wild card
- LL = Lucky loser
- Alt = Alternate
- SE = Special exempt
- PR = Protected ranking
- ITF = ITF entry
- JE = Junior exempt
- w/o = Walkover
- r = Retired
- d = Defaulted
- SR = Special ranking

First round
1	(Japan) S Aoyama (Japan) M Ninomiya	6	6
(Japan) M Miyamura (Thailand) Vara Wongteanchai	1	4
(Japan) A Okuno (China) K Zhang	4	4
(South Korea) J-h Choi (Thailand) N Lertpitaksinchai	6	6
4	(Russia) K Lykina (Georgia (country)) S Shapatava	2	4
(Belgium) E Mertens (India) A Raina	6	6
(Japan) A Omae (Thailand) Pe Plipuech	7^{7}	6
(Japan) M Eguchi (Romania) PM Țig	6^{2}	2
WC	(Thailand) L Kumkhum (Japan) Y Tanaka	6	6
(Japan) K Hisami (Japan) K Takahata	2	4
(South Korea) N-l Han (Chinese Taipei) Y-h Lee	6	4	[7]
3	(Japan) H Kuwata (Japan) J Namigata	1	6	[10]
(Argentina) T Búa (Spain) C Sánchez Quintanar	0	4
WC	(Japan) Y Higuchi (Japan) H Kaji	6	6
WC	(Japan) E Sema (Japan) A Yoshitomi	4	4
2	(Japan) N Hibino (Japan) E Hozumi	6	6

Quarterfinals
1	(Japan) S Aoyama (Japan) M Ninomiya	4	5
(South Korea) J-h Choi (Thailand) N Lertpitaksinchai	6	7
(Belgium) E Mertens (India) A Raina
(Japan) A Omae (Thailand) Pe Plipuech	w/o
WC	(Thailand) L Kumkhum (Japan) Y Tanaka	4	6	[10]
3	(Japan) H Kuwata (Japan) J Namigata	6	4	[7]
WC	(Japan) Y Higuchi (Japan) H Kaji	1	6^{1}
2	(Japan) N Hibino (Japan) E Hozumi	6	7^{7}

Semifinals
(South Korea) J-h Choi (Thailand) N Lertpitaksinchai	4	5
(Japan) A Omae (Thailand) Pe Plipuech	6	7
WC	(Thailand) L Kumkhum (Japan) Y Tanaka	7^{7}	1	[11]
2	(Japan) N Hibino (Japan) E Hozumi	6^{5}	6	[9]

Final
(Japan) A Omae (Thailand) Pe Plipuech	3	6	[11]
WC	(Thailand) L Kumkhum (Japan) Y Tanaka	6	0	[9]
