= 2015 Dunlop World Challenge – Women's singles =

Women's singles
- 2015 Dunlop World Challenge

Final
- Champion: (Croatia) Jana Fett
- Runner-up: (Thailand) Luksika Kumkhum
- Score: 6–4, 4–6, 6–4

Events
Singles	men	women
Doubles	men	women
← 2014 ·	Dunlop World Challenge	· 2016 →

An-Sophie Mestach was the defending champion, but chose not to participate.

Jana Fett won the title, defeating Luksika Kumkhum in the final 6–4, 4–6, 6–4.

== Seeds ==
1. (Japan) Nao Hibino (second round)
2. (Romania) Patricia Maria Țig (second round)
3. (Switzerland) Stefanie Vögele (second round)
4. (China) Zhang Kailin (first round)
5. (Belgium) Elise Mertens (first round)
6. (Japan) Misa Eguchi (quarterfinals)
7. (Japan) Naomi Osaka (semifinals)
8. (Japan) Risa Ozaki (quarterfinals)

== Main draw ==
=== Key ===
- Q = Qualifier
- WC = Wild card
- LL = Lucky loser
- Alt = Alternate
- SE = Special exempt
- PR = Protected ranking
- ITF = ITF entry
- JE = Junior exempt
- w/o = Walkover
- r = Retired
- d = Defaulted
- SR = Special ranking

=== Finals ===
Semifinals
WC	(Russia) Ksenia Lykina	1	6	0
(Thailand) Luksika Kumkhum	6	4	6
7	(Japan) Naomi Osaka	4	1
(Croatia) Jana Fett	6	6

Final
(Thailand) Luksika Kumkhum	4	6	4
(Croatia) Jana Fett	6	4	6

=== Top half ===
First round
1	(Japan) N Hibino	6	4	6
(Japan) E Sema	2	6	1
(Thailand) V Wongteanchai	4	4
WC	(Russia) K Lykina	6	6
WC	(Japan) Y Tanaka	6	6
(Japan) S Aoyama	4	3
(Georgia (country)) S Shapatava	7	6
5	(Belgium) E Mertens	5	3
3	(Switzerland) S Vögele	6	6
(India) A Raina	1	4
(Japan) E Hozumi	5	5
(Thailand) L Kumkhum	7	7
(Japan) M Hibi	7	7^{7}
WC	(Japan) A Yoshitomi	5	6^{4}
Q	(Spain) C Sánchez Quintanar	6	4	1
8	(Japan) R Ozaki	3	6	6

Second round
1	(Japan) N Hibino	1	3
WC	(Russia) K Lykina	6	6
WC	(Japan) Y Tanaka	4	7^{9}	2
(Georgia (country)) S Shapatava	6	6^{7}	6
3	(Switzerland) S Vögele	2	3
(Thailand) L Kumkhum	6	6
(Japan) M Hibi	6	4	4
8	(Japan) R Ozaki	4	6	6

Quarterfinals
WC	(Russia) K Lykina	3	6	7
(Georgia (country)) S Shapatava	6	2	5
(Thailand) L Kumkhum	6	6
8	(Japan) R Ozaki	4	2

Semifinals
WC	(Russia) K Lykina	1	6	0
(Thailand) L Kumkhum	6	4	6

=== Bottom half ===
First round
7	(Japan) N Osaka	4	6	6
Q	(Thailand) N Lertpitaksinchai	6	2	2
Q	(Thailand) N Luangnam	7^{7}	6
(South Korea) S-r Lee	6^{4}	3
(South Korea) N-l Han	3	1
(Japan) H Kuwata	6	6
(Italy) M Caregaro	6	7
4	(China) K Zhang	4	5
6	(Japan) M Eguchi	6	6
(Japan) R Sawayanagi	1	1
(Chinese Taipei) Y-h Lee	1	4
WC	(Japan) M Ninomiya	6	6
Q	(Japan) H Kaji	3	0
(Croatia) J Fett	6	6
(South Korea) S-j Jang	2	6	4
2	(Romania) PM Țig	6	4	6

Second round
7	(Japan) N Osaka	6	6
Q	(Thailand) N Luangnam	0	3
(Japan) H Kuwata	2	4
(Italy) M Caregaro	6	6
6	(Japan) M Eguchi	6	4	6
WC	(Japan) M Ninomiya	1	6	3
(Croatia) J Fett	4	6	6
2	(Romania) PM Țig	6	1	2

Quarterfinals
7	(Japan) N Osaka	6	6
(Italy) M Caregaro	4	4
6	(Japan) M Eguchi	6^{5}	4
(Croatia) J Fett	7^{7}	6

Semifinals
7	(Japan) N Osaka	4	1
(Croatia) J Fett	6	6
