= 2009 Dunlop World Challenge =

Tennis tournament

- Date: 23–29 November
- Edition: 2nd
- Location: Toyota, Japan

Champions

Men's singles
- (Belarus) Uladzimir Ignatik

Women's singles
- (Japan) Kimiko Date-Krumm

Men's doubles
- (Latvia) Andis Juška / (Russia) Alexander Kudryavtsev

Women's doubles
- (New Zealand) Marina Erakovic / (Thailand) Tamarine Tanasugarn
← 2008 ·	Dunlop World Challenge	· 2010 →

The 2009 Dunlop World Challenge was a professional tennis tournament played on indoor carpet courts. It was the second edition of the tournament which was part of the 2009 ATP Challenger Tour and the 2009 ITF Women's Circuit. It took place in Toyota, Japan between 23 and 29 November 2009.

== Singles main-draw entrants ==
=== Seeds ===
Country	Player	Rank^{1}	Seed
JPN	Go Soeda	149	1
KOR	Im Kyu-tae	179	2
GER	Dieter Kindlmann	181	3
RUS	Alexander Kudryavtsev	230	4
JPN	Tatsuma Ito	234	5
AUT	Philipp Oswald	235	6
SVK	Pavol Červenák	242	7
AUS	Nick Lindahl	259	8

- Rankings are as of November 16, 2009.

=== Other entrants ===
The following players received wildcards into the singles main draw:

- (Japan) Hiroki Kondo
- (Japan) Hiroki Moriya
- (Japan) Arata Onozawa
- (Japan) Kento Takeuchi

The following players received entry from the qualifying draw:

- (Chinese Taipei) Chen Ti
- (Japan) Yuichi Ito
- (Japan) Tasuku Iwami
- (South Korea) Jun Woong-sun

== Champions ==
=== Singles ===
(Belarus) Uladzimir Ignatik def. (Japan) Tatsuma Ito, 7–6(7), 7–6(3)

=== Doubles ===
(Latvia) Andis Juška / (Russia) Alexander Kudryavtsev def. (Kazakhstan) Alexey Kedryuk / (Japan) Junn Mitsuhashi, 6–4, 7–6(6)
