= 2016 Dunlop World Challenge – Women's doubles =

Women's doubles
- 2016 Dunlop World Challenge

Final
- Champions: (Russia) Ksenia Lykina (Japan) Akiko Omae
- Runners-up: (Japan) Rika Fujiwara (Japan) Ayaka Okuno
- Score: 6–7^{(4–7)}, 6–2, [10–5]

Events
Singles	men	women
Doubles	men	women
← 2015 ·	Dunlop World Challenge	· 2017 →

Akiko Omae and Peangtarn Plipuech were the defending champions, but Plipuech chose to participate in Taipei instead. Omae partnered Ksenia Lykina and successfully defended her title. Omae and Lykina won the title, defeating Rika Fujiwara and Ayaka Okuno in the final, 6–7^{(4–7)}, 6–2, [10–5].

== Seeds ==
1. (Japan) Shuko Aoyama / (Japan) Makoto Ninomiya (first round)
2. (Russia) Ksenia Lykina / (Japan) Akiko Omae (champions)
3. (Japan) Rika Fujiwara / (Japan) Ayaka Okuno (final)
4. (Japan) Mana Ayukawa / (Japan) Yuuki Tanaka (quarterfinals)

== Draw ==
=== Key ===
- Q = Qualifier
- WC = Wild card
- LL = Lucky loser
- Alt = Alternate
- SE = Special exempt
- PR = Protected ranking
- ITF = ITF entry
- JE = Junior exempt
- w/o = Walkover
- r = Retired
- d = Defaulted
- SR = Special ranking

First round
1	(Japan) S Aoyama (Japan) M Ninomiya	5	6	[5]
(Japan) E Sema (Montenegro) A Veselinović	7	4	[10]
(Japan) M Imanishi (Australia) O Tjandramulia	6	6
WC	(Japan) M Nishimoto (Japan) K Terami	4	0
3	(Japan) R Fujiwara (Japan) A Okuno	6	6
(Thailand) K Buayam (South Korea) J-h Choi	4	2
(Japan) A Inoue (Japan) M Inoue	6	6
(Japan) R Kajitani (Japan) M Miyamura	2	3
WC	(Japan) M Ozeki (Japan) R Ueda	4	2
(Croatia) J Fett (United States) J Loeb	6	6
(Japan) E Hayashi (Japan) H Kaji	1	6^{11}
4	(Japan) M Ayukawa (Japan) Y Tanaka	6	7^{13}
(South Korea) N-r Kim (Thailand) N Luangnam	6	6
WC	(Japan) M Kobori (Japan) A Shimizu	3	4
(Australia) L Cabrera (Hungary) D Gálfi	2	7	[2]
2	(Russia) K Lykina (Japan) A Omae	6	5	[10]

Quarterfinals
(Japan) E Sema (Montenegro) A Veselinović	6	2	[10]
(Japan) M Imanishi (Australia) O Tjandramulia	4	6	[7]
3	(Japan) R Fujiwara (Japan) A Okuno	6	6
(Japan) A Inoue (Japan) M Inoue	1	2
(Croatia) J Fett (United States) J Loeb	6^{7}	6	[10]
4	(Japan) M Ayukawa (Japan) Y Tanaka	7^{9}	2	[5]
(South Korea) N-r Kim (Thailand) N Luangnam	0	0
2	(Russia) K Lykina (Japan) A Omae	6	6

Semifinals
(Japan) E Sema (Montenegro) A Veselinović	3	1
3	(Japan) R Fujiwara (Japan) A Okuno	6	6
(Croatia) J Fett (United States) J Loeb	4	4
2	(Russia) K Lykina (Japan) A Omae	6	6

Final
3	(Japan) R Fujiwara (Japan) A Okuno	7^{7}	2	[5]
2	(Russia) K Lykina (Japan) A Omae	6^{4}	6	[10]
