= 2017 Dunlop World Challenge – Men's doubles =

Men's doubles
- 2017 Dunlop World Challenge

Final
- Champions: (Australia) Max Purcell (Australia) Andrew Whittington
- Runners-up: (Philippines) Ruben Gonzales (Indonesia) Christopher Rungkat
- Score: 6–3, 2–6, [10–8]

Events
Singles	men	women
Doubles	men	women
← 2016 ·	Dunlop World Challenge

Matt Reid and John-Patrick Smith were the defending champions but chose not to defend their title.

Max Purcell and Andrew Whittington won the title after defeating Ruben Gonzales and Christopher Rungkat 6–3, 2–6, [10–8] in the final.

== Seeds ==
1. (Australia) Alex Bolt / (Australia) Bradley Mousley (quarterfinals)
2. (Thailand) Sanchai Ratiwatana / (Thailand) Sonchat Ratiwatana (first round, retired)
3. (Japan) Ben McLachlan / (Japan) Yasutaka Uchiyama (semifinals)
4. (United States) Austin Krajicek / (United States) Jackson Withrow (first round)

== Draw ==
=== Key ===
- Q = Qualifier
- WC = Wild card
- LL = Lucky loser
- Alt = Alternate
- SE = Special exempt
- PR = Protected ranking
- ITF = ITF entry
- JE = Junior exempt
- w/o = Walkover
- r = Retired
- d = Defaulted
- SR = Special ranking

First round
1	(Australia) A Bolt (Australia) B Mousley	7^{8}	6
(Poland) H Hurkacz (Japan) H Moriya	6^{6}	3
(China) X Gao (South Korea) D-h Lee	3	4
(Australia) M Purcell (Australia) A Whittington	6	6
3	(Japan) B McLachlan (Japan) Y Uchiyama	4	7^{7}	[12]
(Chinese Taipei) J Jung (Chinese Taipei) H-y Peng	6	6^{2}	[10]
(China) Z Li (Japan) Y Takahashi	6	6
WC	(Japan) Issei Okamura (Japan) Jumpei Yamasaki	3	3
WC	(Japan) Shintaro Imai (Japan) T Niki	7^{7}	6^{1}	[10]
WC	(Japan) Fuya Kimoto (Japan) Yo Watanuki	6^{5}	7^{7}	[8]
(Japan) T Matsui (Chinese Taipei) C-h Yi	6	6^{2}	[10]
4	(United States) A Krajicek (United States) J Withrow	3	7^{7}	[8]
(Philippines) R Gonzales (Indonesia) C Rungkat	6	6
(Japan) T Daniel (Japan) T Ito	3	3
(Australia) O Jasika (Israel) E Leshem	7^{7}	0
2	(Thailand) Sa Ratiwatana (Thailand) So Ratiwatana	6^{4}	0^{r}

Quarterfinals
1	(Australia) A Bolt (Australia) B Mousley	4	6^{4}
(Australia) M Purcell (Australia) A Whittington	6	7^{7}
3	(Japan) B McLachlan (Japan) Y Uchiyama	6	6
(China) Z Li (Japan) Y Takahashi	4	1
WC	(Japan) S Imai (Japan) T Niki	7^{7}	4	[4]
(Japan) T Matsui (Chinese Taipei) C-h Yi	6^{3}	6	[10]
(Philippines) R Gonzales (Indonesia) C Rungkat	7^{7}	7
(Australia) O Jasika (Israel) E Leshem	6^{4}	5

Semifinals
(Australia) M Purcell (Australia) A Whittington	4	6	[10]
3	(Japan) B McLachlan (Japan) Y Uchiyama	6	1	[4]
(Japan) T Matsui (Chinese Taipei) C-h Yi	6^{1}	3
(Philippines) R Gonzales (Indonesia) C Rungkat	7^{7}	6

Final
(Australia) M Purcell (Australia) A Whittington	6	2	[10]
(Philippines) R Gonzales (Indonesia) C Rungkat	3	6	[8]
