= 2015 Dunlop World Challenge – Men's singles =

Men's singles
- 2015 Dunlop World Challenge

Final
- Champion: (Japan) Yoshihito Nishioka
- Runner-up: (Russia) Alexander Kudryavtsev
- Score: 6–3, 6–4

Events
Singles	men	women
Doubles	men	women
- Dunlop World Challenge

Yoshihito Nishioka won the title, defeating Alexander Kudryavtsev in the final 6–3, 6–4.

== Seeds ==
1. (Australia) Matthew Ebden (first round, retired)
2. (Japan) Tatsuma Ito (quarterfinals)
3. (Australia) James Duckworth (second round)
4. (Japan) Go Soeda (second round, retired)
5. (Japan) Yūichi Sugita (semifinals)
6. (Russia) Konstantin Kravchuk (semifinals)
7. (Japan) Yoshihito Nishioka (champion)
8. (Australia) Jordan Thompson (first round)

== Draw ==
Key

- Q = Qualifier
- WC = Wild card
- LL = Lucky loser
- Alt = Alternate
- ITF = ITF entry
- PR = Protected ranking
- SR = Special ranking
- SE = Special exempt
- JE = Junior exempt
- JR = Junior Accelerator Programme entrant
- CO = College Accelerator Programme entrant
- NG = Next Gen Accelerator Program entrant
- w/o = Walkover
- r = Retired
- d = Defaulted

=== Finals ===
Semifinals
6	(Russia) Konstantin Kravchuk	2	5
7	(Japan) Yoshihito Nishioka	6	7
(Russia) Alexander Kudryavtsev	7^{7}	6^{5}	6
5	(Japan) Yūichi Sugita	6^{4}	7^{7}	3

Final
7	(Japan) Yoshihito Nishioka	6	6
(Russia) Alexander Kudryavtsev	3	4

=== Top half ===
First round
1	(Australia) M Ebden	6^{4}	3^{r}
PR	(Australia) G Jones	7^{7}	2
(Australia) Gavin van Peperzeel	4	2
WC	(Japan) Sho Katayama	6	6
(Poland) A Kapaś	3	6^{4}
Q	(Japan) Itsuki Imina	6	7^{7}
WC	(Japan) Makoto Ochi	3	1
6	(Russia) K Kravchuk	6	6
4	(Japan) G Soeda	6	6
(Japan) Y Uchiyama	4	3
WC	(Japan) Yu Watanuki	6^{5}	6^{4}
(South Africa) T Vorster	7^{7}	7^{7}
Q	(Japan) Keisuke Watanuki	4	3
(Japan) Shuichi Sekiguchi	6	6
(Japan) H Moriya	3	3
7	(Japan) Y Nishioka	6	6

Second round
PR	(Australia) G Jones	5	6^{5}
WC	(Japan) S Katayama	7	7^{7}
Q	(Japan) I Imina	2	4
6	(Russia) K Kravchuk	6	6
4	(Japan) G Soeda	3	r
(South Africa) T Vorster	6
(Japan) S Sekiguchi	4	3
7	(Japan) Y Nishioka	6	6

Quarterfinals
WC	(Japan) S Katayama	2	6^{4}
6	(Russia) K Kravchuk	6	7^{7}
(South Africa) T Vorster	6	5	5
7	(Japan) Y Nishioka	3	7	7

Semifinals
6	(Russia) K Kravchuk	2	5
7	(Japan) Y Nishioka	6	7

=== Bottom half ===
First round
8	(Australia) J Thompson	2	4
(Chinese Taipei) J Jung	6	6
(Italy) R Ghedin	3	2
(Chinese Taipei) T Chen	6	6
(Russia) A Kudryavtsev	6	6
(Indonesia) C Rungkat	1	0
WC	(Japan) Sora Fukuda	3	4
3	(Australia) J Duckworth	6	6
5	(Japan) Y Sugita	6^{2}	7^{7}	6
(United Kingdom) B Klein	7^{7}	6^{3}	2
Q	(Australia) B Mitchell	6	3	6
(Australia) M Reid	3	6	1
(Japan) K Takeuchi	6	3	0
Q	(Japan) Yuya Kibi	4	6	6
(Australia) O Jasika	6^{1}	3
2	(Japan) T Ito	7	6

Second round
(Chinese Taipei) J Jung	4	6	7^{7}
(Chinese Taipei) T Chen	6	4	6^{4}
(Russia) A Kudryavtsev	7^{7}	6
3	(Australia) J Duckworth	6^{1}	3
5	(Japan) Y Sugita	3	6	3
Q	(Australia) B Mitchell	6	1	1^{r}
Q	(Japan) Y Kibi	6^{5}	3
2	(Japan) T Ito	7^{7}	6

Quarterfinals
(Chinese Taipei) J Jung	3	3
(Russia) A Kudryavtsev	6	6
5	(Japan) Y Sugita	6	6
2	(Japan) T Ito	3	4

Semifinals
(Russia) A Kudryavtsev	7^{7}	6^{5}	6
5	(Japan) Y Sugita	6^{4}	7^{7}	3
