= 2015 Dunlop World Challenge – Men's doubles =

Men's doubles
- 2015 Dunlop World Challenge

Final
- Champions: (United Kingdom) Brydan Klein (Australia) Matt Reid
- Runners-up: (Italy) Riccardo Ghedin (Chinese Taipei) Yi Chu-huan
- Score: 6–2, 7–6^{(7–3)}

Events
Singles	men	women
Doubles	men	women
- Dunlop World Challenge

Brydan Klein and Matt Reid won the title, defeating Riccardo Ghedin and Yi Chu-huan in the final 6–2, 7–6.^{(7–3)}

== Seeds ==
1. (Thailand) Sanchai Ratiwatana / (Thailand) Sonchat Ratiwatana (semifinals)
2. (United States) James Cerretani / (Chinese Taipei) Chen Ti (quarterfinals)
3. (Italy) Riccardo Ghedin / (Chinese Taipei) Yi Chu-huan (final)
4. (United Kingdom) Brydan Klein / (Australia) Matt Reid (champions)

== Draw ==
Key

- Q = Qualifier
- WC = Wild card
- LL = Lucky loser
- Alt = Alternate
- ITF = ITF entry
- PR = Protected ranking
- SR = Special ranking
- SE = Special exempt
- JE = Junior exempt
- JR = Junior Accelerator Programme entrant
- CO = College Accelerator Programme entrant
- NG = Next Gen Accelerator Program entrant
- w/o = Walkover
- r = Retired
- d = Defaulted

=== Draw ===
First round
1	(Thailand) Sa Ratiwatana (Thailand) So Ratiwatana	7	6
(United States) JP Fruttero (India) P Raja	5	3
(Australia) B Mitchell (Australia) J Thompson	6	4	[11]
(Russia) A Kudryavtsev (Japan) Keisuke Watanuki	3	6	[9]
4	(United Kingdom) B Klein (Australia) M Reid	5	6	[10]
(Japan) Sho Katayama (Japan) H Kondo	7	3	[6]
WC	(Japan) Sora Fukuda (Japan) Y Nishioka	6	4	[12]
(Japan) T Matsui (Indonesia) C Rungkat	1	6	[10]
(Japan) Shuichi Sekiguchi (Japan) K Takeuchi	7	4	[4]
WC	(Japan) Yo Watanuki (Japan) Yu Watanuki	5	6	[10]
(Poland) A Kapaś (Japan) Y Uchiyama	6^{5}	5
3	(Italy) R Ghedin (Chinese Taipei) C-h Yi	7^{7}	7
WC	(Japan) Koichi Sano (Japan) Shunrou Takeshima	3	3
(Chinese Taipei) J Jung (South Africa) T Vorster	6	6
(Japan) B Sato (Australia) Gavin van Peperzeel	4	7^{7}	[10]
2	(United States) J Cerretani (Chinese Taipei) T Chen	6	6^{5}	[12]

Quarterfinals
1	(Thailand) Sa Ratiwatana (Thailand) So Ratiwatana	6	6
(Australia) B Mitchell (Australia) J Thompson	2	2
4	(United Kingdom) B Klein (Australia) M Reid	2	6	[12]
WC	(Japan) S Fukuda (Japan) Y Nishioka	6	1	[10]
WC	(Japan) Yo Watanuki (Japan) Yu Watanuki	6^{0}	3
3	(Italy) R Ghedin (Chinese Taipei) C-h Yi	7^{7}	6
(Chinese Taipei) J Jung (South Africa) T Vorster	6	6
2	(United States) J Cerretani (Chinese Taipei) T Chen	3	2

Semifinals
1	(Thailand) Sa Ratiwatana (Thailand) So Ratiwatana	3	6	[5]
4	(United Kingdom) B Klein (Australia) M Reid	6	3	[10]
3	(Italy) R Ghedin (Chinese Taipei) C-h Yi	6
(Chinese Taipei) J Jung (South Africa) T Vorster	4	r

Final
4	(United Kingdom) B Klein (Australia) M Reid	6	7^{7}
3	(Italy) R Ghedin (Chinese Taipei) C-h Yi	2	6^{3}
