= 2010 Dunlop World Challenge – Women's singles =

Women's singles
- 2010 Dunlop World Challenge

Final
- Champion: (Japan) Misaki Doi
- Runner-up: (Japan) Junri Namigata
- Score: 7–5, 6–2

Events
Singles	men	women
Doubles	men	women
- Dunlop World Challenge

Kimiko Date-Krumm was the defending champion, but chose to not compete this year.
Misaki Doi defeated Junri Namigata in the final 7–5, 6–2.

== Seeds ==
1. (Japan) Ayumi Morita (semifinals, retired)
2. (Croatia) Mirjana Lučić (semifinals)
3. (Japan) Junri Namigata (final)
4. (Japan) Misaki Doi (champion)
5. (Germany) Kathrin Wörle (quarterfinals)
6. (Turkey) Çağla Büyükakçay (first round)
7. (Thailand) Noppawan Lertcheewakarn (quarterfinals)
8. (Japan) Ryoko Fuda (first round)

== Draw ==
Key

- Q = Qualifier
- WC = Wild card
- LL = Lucky loser
- Alt = Alternate
- ITF = ITF entry
- PR = Protected ranking
- SR = Special ranking
- SE = Special exempt
- JE = Junior exempt
- JR = Junior Accelerator Programme entrant
- CO = College Accelerator Programme entrant
- NG = Next Gen Accelerator Program entrant
- w/o = Walkover
- r = Retired
- d = Defaulted

=== Finals ===
Semifinals
1	(Japan) Ayumi Morita	2^{r}
4	(Japan) Misaki Doi	3
3	(Japan) Junri Namigata	3	7	6
2	(Croatia) Mirjana Lučić	6	6^{2}	2

Final
4	(Japan) Misaki Doi	7	6
3	(Japan) Junri Namigata	5	2

=== Top half ===
First round
1	(Japan) A Morita	6	6
(Japan) Y Sema	3	2
LL	(South Korea) K-h Kim	6	6
Q	(Japan) K Takahata	0	0
WC	(Russia) K Lykina	3	6	6
(Hong Kong) L Zhang	6	0	3
(Japan) N Hamamura	7	3	4
5	(Germany) K Wörle	6^{5}	6	6
4	(Japan) M Doi	6	7
(Romania) E Bogdan	3	6^{0}
(Thailand) N Luangnam	1	6^{0}
(Romania) M Gojnea	6	7
Q	(Japan) S Aoyama	2	2
(Japan) T Yonemura	6	6
(Chinese Taipei) W-h Hsu	4	3
7	(Thailand) N Lertcheewakarn	6	6

Second round
1	(Japan) A Morita	6	6
LL	(South Korea) K-h Kim	1	1
WC	(Russia) K Lykina	4	3
5	(Germany) K Wörle	6	6
4	(Japan) M Doi	5	6	6
(Romania) M Gojnea	7	2	3
(Japan) T Yonemura	3	3
7	(Thailand) N Lertcheewakarn	6	6

Quarterfinals
1	(Japan) A Morita	6	6
5	(Germany) K Wörle	3	3
4	(Japan) M Doi	6	5	6
7	(Thailand) N Lertcheewakarn	4	7	1

Semifinals
1	(Japan) A Morita	2^{r}
4	(Japan) M Doi	3

=== Bottom half ===
First round
8	(Japan) R Fuda	3	6^{3}
Q	(Japan) E Takao	6	7
(Japan) R Fujiwara	6	5	6
(Japan) R Tezuka	4	7	1
WC	(Japan) A Nakamura	5	6	2
(Japan) C Okadaue	7	2	6
(Japan) A Yonemura	7	6^{4}	3
3	(Japan) J Namigata	6^{4}	7	6
6	(Turkey) Ç Büyükakçay	6^{4}	6	5
WC	(Japan) S Ishizu	7	4	7
(Romania) I-C Begu	6	6
(Japan) K Iijima	0	3
WC	(Japan) A Omae	6	6
(Japan) S Akita	4	4
Q	(Japan) Mi Inoue	3	7	4
2	(Croatia) M Lučić	6	6^{5}	6

Second round
Q	(Japan) E Takao	6	6
(Japan) R Fujiwara	3	4
(Japan) C Okadaue	7	1	3
3	(Japan) J Namigata	5	6	6
WC	(Japan) S Ishizu	7	3	6
(Romania) I-C Begu	5	6	3
WC	(Japan) A Omae	3	2
2	(Croatia) M Lučić	6	6

Quarterfinals
Q	(Japan) E Takao	4	6	2
3	(Japan) J Namigata	6	4	6
WC	(Japan) S Ishizu	2	6	2
2	(Croatia) M Lučić	6	4	6

Semifinals
3	(Japan) J Namigata	3	7	6
2	(Croatia) M Lučić	6	6^{2}	2
