= 2016 Dunlop World Challenge =

- Date: 14–20 November
- Edition: 9th
- Category: ATP Challenger Tour; ITF Women's Circuit
- Prize money: $50,000+H (men) $50,000+H (women)
- Surface: Hard (indoor)
- Location: Toyota, Japan

Champions

Men's singles
- (Australia) James Duckworth

Women's singles
- (Belarus) Aryna Sabalenka

Men's doubles
- (Australia) Matt Reid / (Australia) John-Patrick Smith

Women's doubles
- (Russia) Ksenia Lykina / (Japan) Akiko Omae
← 2015 ·	Dunlop World Challenge	· 2017 →

The 2016 Dunlop World Challenge was a professional tennis tournament played on indoor hard courts. It was the 9th edition of the tournament and part of the 2016 ATP Challenger Tour and the 2016 ITF Women's Circuit, offering $50,000+H each in prize money for both men and women's events. It took place in Toyota, Japan, on 14–20 November 2016.

== Men's singles main draw entrants ==
=== Seeds ===
Country	Player	Rank^{1}	Seed
JPN	Yoshihito Nishioka	100	1
JPN	Yūichi Sugita	107	2
JPN	Go Soeda	119	3
KOR	Chung Hyeon	126	4
AUS	James Duckworth	130	5
KOR	Lee Duck-hee	151	6
JPN	Tatsuma Ito	177	7
JPN	Hiroki Moriya	182	8

- ^{1} Rankings as of 7 November 2016.

=== Other entrants ===
The following players received wildcards into the singles main draw:

- (Japan) Makoto Ochi
- (Japan) Yusuke Takahashi
- (Japan) Yosuke Watanuki
- (Japan) Yusuke Watanuki

The following players received entry from the qualifying draw:

- (Japan) Kento Takeuchi
- (South Korea) Lim Yong-kyu
- (Poland) Michał Przysiężny
- (Belarus) Yaraslav Shyla

== Women's singles main draw entrants ==
=== Seeds ===
Country	Player	Rank^{1}	Seed
JPN	Kurumi Nara	78	1
BLR	Aryna Sabalenka	159	2
RUS	Ksenia Lykina	172	3
UZB	Nigina Abduraimova	178	4
CRO	Jana Fett	196	5
USA	Jamie Loeb	203	6
JPN	Mayo Hibi	209	7
JPN	Shuko Aoyama	218	8

- ^{1} Rankings as of 7 November 2016.

=== Other entrants ===
The following player received a wildcard into the singles main draw:

- (Japan) Haruka Kaji
- (Japan) Momoko Kobori
- (Japan) Michika Ozeki
- (Japan) Ramu Ueda

The following players received entry from the qualifying draw:

- (Japan) Miharu Imanishi
- (South Korea) Kim Na-ri
- (United States) Tori Kinard
- (Japan) Chihiro Muramatsu

== Champions ==
=== Men's singles ===
- (Australia) James Duckworth def. (Japan) Tatsuma Ito, 7–5, 4–6, 6–1

=== Women's singles ===
- (Belarus) Aryna Sabalenka def. (Australia) Lizette Cabrera, 6–2, 6–4

=== Men's doubles ===
- (Australia) Matt Reid / (Australia) John-Patrick Smith def. (India) Jeevan Nedunchezhiyan / (Indonesia) Christopher Rungkat, 6–3, 6–4

=== Women's doubles ===
- (Russia) Ksenia Lykina / (Japan) Akiko Omae def. (Japan) Rika Fujiwara / (Japan) Ayaka Okuno, 6–7^{(4–7)}, 6–2, [10–5]
