= 2017 Dunlop World Challenge – Women's doubles =

Women's doubles
- 2017 Dunlop World Challenge

Final
- Champion: (Russia) Ksenia Lykina (Japan) Junri Namigata
- Runner-up: (Thailand) Nicha Lertpitaksinchai (Thailand) Peangtarn Plipuech
- Score: 3–6, 6–3, [10–4]

Events
Singles	men	women
Doubles	men	women
← 2016 ·	Dunlop World Challenge

Ksenia Lykina and Akiko Omae were the defending champions, but Omae chose not to participate.

Lykina partnered alongside Junri Namigata, and successfully defended her title, defeating Nicha Lertpitaksinchai and Peangtarn Plipuech in the final, 3–6, 6–3, [10–4].

== Seeds ==
1. (Russia) Ksenia Lykina / (Japan) Junri Namigata (champions)
2. (United States) Emina Bektas / (United States) Sabrina Santamaria (first round)
3. (India) Ankita Raina / (Japan) Erika Sema (first round)
4. (Thailand) Nicha Lertpitaksinchai / (Thailand) Peangtarn Plipuech (final)

== Draw ==
=== Key ===
- Q = Qualifier
- WC = Wild card
- LL = Lucky loser
- Alt = Alternate
- SE = Special exempt
- PR = Protected ranking
- ITF = ITF entry
- JE = Junior exempt
- w/o = Walkover
- r = Retired
- d = Defaulted
- SR = Special ranking

First round
1	(Russia) K Lykina (Japan) J Namigata	5	7^{7}	[10]
WC	(Japan) H Kaji (Japan) R Sawayanagi	7	6^{3}	[3]
(United Kingdom) K Dunne (Japan) A Okuno	5	7^{7}	[10]
(South Korea) J-h Choi (South Korea) N-r Kim	7	6^{2}	[4]
3	(India) A Raina (Japan) E Sema	4	7^{7}	[4]
(Japan) R Fujiwara (Japan) A Shimizu	6	6^{5}	[10]
(Indonesia) B Gumulya (Japan) K Takahata	6	7^{7}
(Romania) M Buzărnescu (Hungary) D Gálfi	2	6^{4}
(Thailand) Vara Wongteanchai (Thailand) Varu Wongteanchai	6	4	[10]
(Japan) M Imanishi (Japan) M Kobori	2	6	[4]
WC	(Japan) F Kozaki (Japan) A Miyamoto	3	2
4	(Thailand) N Lertpitaksinchai (Thailand) P Plipuech	6	6
(China) J Kang (China) Jia Lu	1	5
(Italy) G Brescia (Hungary) Á Bukta	6	7
WC	(Japan) M Nishimoto (Japan) A Yoshitomi	6	6
2	(United States) E Bektas (United States) S Santamaria	4	1

Quarterfinals
1	(Russia) K Lykina (Japan) J Namigata	4	6	[10]
(United Kingdom) K Dunne (Japan) A Okuno	6	4	[7]
(Japan) R Fujiwara (Japan) A Shimizu	6	7^{14}
(Indonesia) B Gumulya (Japan) K Takahata	2	6^{12}
(Thailand) Vara Wongteanchai (Thailand) Varu Wongteanchai	1	3
4	(Thailand) N Lertpitaksinchai (Thailand) P Plipuech	6	6
(Italy) G Brescia (Hungary) Á Bukta	6	4	[3]
WC	(Japan) M Nishimoto (Japan) A Yoshitomi	3	6	[10]

Semifinals
1	(Russia) K Lykina (Japan) J Namigata	6	6
(Japan) R Fujiwara (Japan) A Shimizu	4	3
4	(Thailand) N Lertpitaksinchai (Thailand) P Plipuech	6	6
WC	(Japan) M Nishimoto (Japan) A Yoshitomi	4	1

Final
1	(Russia) K Lykina (Japan) J Namigata	3	6	[10]
4	(Thailand) N Lertpitaksinchai (Thailand) P Plipuech	6	3	[4]
