= 2010 Dunlop World Challenge =

Tennis tournament

- Date: November 22 – 28
- Edition: 3rd
- Location: Toyota, Japan

Champions

Men's singles
- (Japan) Tatsuma Ito

Women's singles
- (Japan) Misaki Doi

Men's doubles
- (Philippines) Treat Conrad Huey / (India) Purav Raja

Women's doubles
- (Japan) Shuko Aoyama / (Japan) Rika Fujiwara
- Dunlop World Challenge

The 2010 Dunlop World Challenge was a professional tennis tournament played on indoor carpet courts. It was the third edition of the tournament which was part of the 2010 ATP Challenger Tour and 2010 ITF Women's Circuit. It took place in Toyota, Japan between 22 and 28 November 2010.

== ATP entrants ==
=== Seeds ===
Country	Player	Rank^{1}	Seed
JPN	Go Soeda	122	1
IRL	Conor Niland	147	2
JPN	Tatsuma Ito	196	3
JPN	Yūichi Sugita	214	4
AUS	Bernard Tomic	219	5
AUS	Greg Jones	243	6
ESP	Pablo Santos	270	7
TPE	~~Yang Tsung-hua~~	~~278~~	~~8~~

- Rankings are as of November 15, 2010.

=== Other entrants ===
The following players received wildcards into the singles main draw:

- (Japan) Hiroyasu Ehara
- (Japan) Junn Mitsuhashi
- (Japan) Takuto Niki
- (Japan) Arata Onozawa

The following players received entry from the qualifying draw:

- (Japan) Tasuku Iwami
- (Japan) Toshihide Matsui
- (Japan) Kento Takeuchi (LL)
- (Japan) Yasutaka Uchiyama
- (Chinese Taipei) Wang Yeu-tzuoo

== WTA entrants ==
=== Seeds ===
Country	Player	Rank^{1}	Seed
JPN	Ayumi Morita	77	1
CRO	Mirjana Lučić	108	2
JPN	Junri Namigata	128	3
JPN	Misaki Doi	158	4
GER	Kathrin Wörle	162	5
TUR	Çağla Büyükakçay	191	6
THA	Noppawan Lertcheewakarn	200	7
JPN	Ryōko Fuda	205	8

- Rankings are as of November 15, 2010.

=== Other entrants ===
The following players received wildcards into the singles main draw:

- (Japan) Sachie Ishizu
- (Russia) Ksenia Lykina
- (Japan) Aiko Nakamura
- (Japan) Akiko Omae

The following players received entry from the qualifying draw:

- (Japan) Shuko Aoyama
- (Japan) Miyabi Inoue
- (South Korea) Kim Kun-hee (LL)
- (Japan) Kotomi Takahata
- (Japan) Erika Takao

== Champions ==
=== Men's singles ===
(Japan) Tatsuma Ito def. (Japan) Yūichi Sugita, 6–4, 6–2

=== Women's singles ===
(Japan) Misaki Doi def. (Japan) Junri Namigata, 7–5, 6–2

=== Men's doubles ===
(Philippines) Treat Conrad Huey / (India) Purav Raja def. (Japan) Tasuku Iwami / (Japan) Hiroki Kondo, 6–1, 6–2

=== Women's doubles ===
(Japan) Shuko Aoyama / (Japan) Rika Fujiwara def. (Romania) Irina-Camelia Begu / (Romania) Mădălina Gojnea, 1–6, 6–3, [11–9]
