= 2015 Dunlop World Challenge =

- Date: 23–29 November
- Edition: 8th
- Category: ATP Challenger Tour; ITF Women's Circuit
- Prize money: $40,000+H (ATP) $75,000+H (ITF)
- Surface: Carpet / Indoor
- Location: Toyota, Japan

Champions

Men's singles
- (Japan) Yoshihito Nishioka

Women's singles
- (Croatia) Jana Fett

Men's doubles
- (United Kingdom) Brydan Klein / (Australia) Matt Reid

Women's doubles
- (Japan) Akiko Omae / (Thailand) Peangtarn Plipuech
← 2014 ·	Dunlop World Challenge	· 2016 →

The 2015 Dunlop Srixon World Challenge was a professional tennis tournament played on indoor carpet courts. It was the eighth edition of the tournament and part of the 2015 ATP Challenger Tour and 2015 ITF Women's Circuit, offering a total of $75,000+H (ITF) and $40,000+H (ATP) in prize money. It took place in Toyota, Japan, on 23–29 November 2015.

== Men's singles main-draw entrants ==
=== Seeds ===
Country	Player	Rank^{1}	Seed
AUS	Matthew Ebden	107	1
JPN	Tatsuma Ito	116	2
AUS	James Duckworth	117	3
JPN	Go Soeda	120	4
JPN	Yūichi Sugita	127	5
RUS	Konstantin Kravchuk	138	6
JPN	Yoshihito Nishioka	143	7
AUS	Jordan Thompson	154	8

- ^{1} Rankings as of 16 November 2015.

=== Other entrants ===
The following players received wildcards into the singles main draw:

- (Japan) Sora Fukuda
- (Japan) Sho Katayama
- (Japan) Makoto Ochi
- (Japan) Yusuke Watanuki

The following player received protected ranking entry to the main draw:

- (Australia) Greg Jones

The following players received entry from the qualifying draw:

- (Japan) Itsuki Imina
- (Japan) Yuya Kibi
- (Australia) Benjamin Mitchell
- (Japan) Keisuke Watanuki

== Women's singles main-draw entrants ==
=== Seeds ===
Country	Player	Rank^{1}	Seed
JPN	Nao Hibino	73	1
ROU	Patricia Maria Țig	118	2
SUI	Stefanie Vögele	122	3
CHN	Zhang Kailin	141	4
BEL	Elise Mertens	151	5
JPN	Misa Eguchi	156	6
JPN	Naomi Osaka	157	7
JPN	Risa Ozaki	160	8

- ^{1} Rankings as of 16 November 2015.

=== Other entrants ===
The following players received wildcards into the singles main draw:

- (Russia) Ksenia Lykina
- (Japan) Makoto Ninomiya
- (Japan) Yuuki Tanaka
- (Japan) Aiko Yoshitomi

The following players received entry from the qualifying draw:

- (Japan) Haruka Kaji
- (Thailand) Nicha Lertpitaksinchai
- (Thailand) Nudnida Luangnam
- (Spain) Cristina Sánchez Quintanar

== Champions ==
=== Men's singles ===
- (Japan) Yoshihito Nishioka def. (Russia) Alexander Kudryavtsev 6–3, 6–4

=== Women's singles ===
- (Croatia) Jana Fett def. (Thailand) Luksika Kumkhum 6–4, 4–6, 6–4

=== Men's doubles ===
- (United Kingdom) Brydan Klein / (Australia) Matt Reid def. (Italy) Riccardo Ghedin / (Chinese Taipei) Yi Chu-huan 6–2, 7–6^{(7–3)}

=== Women's doubles ===
- (Japan) Akiko Omae / (Thailand) Peangtarn Plipuech def. (Thailand) Luksika Kumkhum / (Japan) Yuuki Tanaka 3–6, 6–0, [11–9]
