= Tasuku Iwami =

Japanese tennis player (born 1978)

- Country (sports): Japan
- Born: 9 July 1978 (age 46); Fukuoka, Japan
- Height: 1.68 m (5 ft 6 in)
- Plays: Left-handed
- Prize money: $117,324

Singles
- Career record: 1–3 (at ATP Tour level, Grand Slam level, and in Davis Cup)
- Career titles: 0
- Highest ranking: No. 260 (23 June 2003)

Doubles
- Career record: 0–1 (at ATP Tour level, Grand Slam level, and in Davis Cup)
- Career titles: 0
- Highest ranking: No. 306 (7 February 2011)
- Last updated on: 25 June 2018.

Tasuku Iwami (岩見 亮, Iwami Tasuku, born 9 July 1978) is a former Japanese tennis player.

Iwami has a career high ATP singles ranking of 260 achieved on 23 June 2003. He also has a career high ATP doubles ranking of 306 achieved on 7 February 2011.

Iwami made his ATP World Tour main draw debut at the 2003 AIG Japan Open Tennis Championships after qualifying for the singles main draw. In 2018, he became the personal coach of wheelchair tennis icon Shingo Kunieda.
