= Yuuki Tanaka =

Japanese tennis player (born 1990)

- Native name: 田中 優季
- Country (sports): Japan
- Born: 7 March 1990 (age 36) Chita, Japan
- Height: 1.60 m (5 ft 3 in)
- Retired: 2019
- Plays: Left (two-handed backhand)
- Prize money: $97,578

Singles
- Career record: 246–211
- Career titles: 1 ITF
- Highest ranking: No. 308 (11 September 2017)

Doubles
- Career record: 130–119
- Career titles: 6 ITF
- Highest ranking: No. 214 (29 August 2016)

Yuuki Tanaka (Japanese: 田中 優季, Hepburn: Tanaka Yūki; born 7 March 1990) is a Japanese former tennis player.

On 11 September 2017, Tanaka reached her best singles ranking of world No. 308. On 29 August 2016, she peaked at No. 214 in the doubles rankings. In her career, Tanaka won one singles title and six doubles titles on the ITF Women's Circuit.

She made her main-draw debut on the WTA Tour at the 2016 Jiangxi International Open, in the doubles event, partnering Tian Ran. Her biggest ITF tournament was the $75k 2015 Dunlop World Challenge doubles final, which she lost partnering with Luksika Kumkhum.

== Early life and amateur tennis ==
Tanaka was born in Chita, Aichi Prefecture and attended Yawata Elementary School and Yawata Junior High School in Chita and Sugiyama Jogakuen High School in Nagoya. She participated in her first ITF tournament at the age of 16 in July 2006, advancing through three rounds of qualifying at the $25k event in Nagoya before losing in the round of 32.

After high school, she attended Waseda University in Tokyo and graduated with a degree in sports science.

Tanaka commenced playing tennis at nine years of age. In September 2010, she ended runner-up in the women's singles event of the All-Japan Inter-Collegiate Tennis Tournament, losing to fellow Waseda student Hiroko Kuwata in the final. She also finished runner-up in the doubles event, partnering Waseda classmate Shiho Otake and losing to fellow Waseda students Emiko Ito and Mai Iwazaki in the final. In October 2010, she led the Waseda women's team to their fifth consecutive All-Japan Collegiate Tennis Championships title and was named MVP of the tournament. In December 2010, she partnered with Otake to win the national inter-collegiate indoor tournament in Osaka.

In March 2011, Tanaka advanced to an ITF final for the first time, partnering with Chinami Ogi and losing to Mari Inoue and Ayumi Oka in the final of the Miyazaki outdoor carpet tournament. She also advanced to the quarterfinals in the singles draw of the same tournament.

At the 2011 Inter-Collegiate Championship, Tanaka and Otake faced Ito and Iwazake again, defeating them in the final of the women's doubles. Tanaka finished fourth in the singles competition.

== Professional ==
Tanaka turned professional in February 2012, just prior to her graduation from Waseda. Her coach has been Atsushi Okutaka since April 2012. In June 2012, she won her first ITF Circuit title, partnering with her former Waseda teammate Kuwata to win the $10k Mie outdoor tournament, defeating Akari Inoue and Kaori Onishi in the final.

In March 2013, Tanaka won her first singles title, defeating Kuwata in the final of the $10k Kōfu hardcourt tournament. In the same month, Tanaka and Kuwata were named as part of Japan's five-member women's tennis team for the 2013 Summer Universiade in Kazan, Russia.

In July 2013, Japan won the gold medal in the women's team event at the Summer Universiade. In the main draw of the women's singles, Tanaka's teammates Sachie Ishizu and Kuwata won gold and bronze respectively. Tanaka was the top seed in the consolation draw of the women's singles and won the final against the fourth member of the Japanese team, Megumi Nishimoto. Tanaka and Ishizu were seeded fifth in the women's doubles event and lost in the quarterfinals.

In November 2015, Tanaka advanced to the second round of the Tokyo Open losing to eventual runner-up, top seed Nao Hibino. Later the same month, Tanaka and her partner Luksika Kumkhum advanced to the final of the doubles draw of the Dunlop World Challenge, losing in a match tie-break to Akiko Omae and Peangtarn Plipuech.

In the first half of 2016, Tanaka partnered Mana Ayukawa in the finals of two ITF tournaments in Mildura and Karuizawa, but the pair lost in two sets on both occasions. In August, Tanaka's doubles ranking had improved to her career-best No. 216 and she made her WTA Tour main-draw debut at the Jiangxi International Open, partnering Tian Ran in the doubles event. The pair lost to top seeds Wang Yafan and Yang Zhaoxuan in round one.

== ITF Circuit finals ==
=== Singles (1–6) ===
Legend $25,000 tournaments $15,000 tournaments $10,000 tournaments	Finals by surface Hard (1–4) Clay (0–1) Carpet (0–1)

Result	No.	Date	Tournament	Surface	Opponent	Score
Loss	1	13 August 2012	ITF İstanbul, Turkey	Hard	(Japan) Mari Tanaka	0–6, 2–6
Loss	2	15 September 2012	ITF Kyoto, Japan	Carpet (i)	(Japan) Nao Hibino	4–6, 6–2, 2–6
Win	1	23 March 2013	Kōfu International Open, Japan	Hard	(Japan) Hiroko Kuwata	6–3, 6–1
Loss	3	24 February 2014	ITF Nonthaburi, Thailand	Hard	(China) Xun Fangying	6–7^{(2)}, 2–6
Loss	4	1 February 2015	ITF Sharm El Sheikh, Egypt	Hard	(Latvia) Anastasija Sevastova	5–7, 3–6
Loss	5	7 February 2015	ITF Sharm El Sheikh, Egypt	Hard	(Austria) Melanie Klaffner	5–7, 6–3, 2–6
Loss	6	30 April 2017	ITF Antalya, Turkey	Clay	(Belgium) Ysaline Bonaventure	4–6, 2–6

=== Doubles (6–10) ===
Legend $75,000 tournaments $25,000 tournaments $15,000 tournaments $10,000 tournaments	Finals by surface Hard (2–5) Clay (2–1) Grass (2–2) Carpet (0–2)

Result	No.	Date	Tournament	Surface	Partner	Opponents	Score
Loss	1	20 March 2011	ITF Miyazaki, Japan	Carpet	(Japan) Chinami Ogi	(Japan) Mari Inoue (Japan) Ayumi Oka	7–5, 2–6, [8–10]
Win	1	24 June 2012	ITF Mie, Japan	Grass	(Japan) Hiroko Kuwata	(Japan) Akari Inoue (Japan) Kaori Onishi	6–3, 3–6, [10–5]
Loss	2	23 December 2014	ITF İstanbul, Turkey	Hard (i)	(Russia) Ekaterina Yashina	(Belgium) Elise Mertens (Turkey) İpek Soylu	0–6, 6–7^{(3)}
Loss	3	24 February 2014	ITF Nonthaburi, Thailand	Hard	(Japan) Miyu Kato	(Thailand) Nungnadda Wannasuk (Thailand) Varunya Wongteanchai	2–6, 2–6
Loss	4	13 April 2014	ITF Melbourne, Australia	Clay	(Japan) Miyu Kato	(Australia) Jessica Moore (Bulgaria) Aleksandrina Naydenova	5–7, 7–6^{(5)}, [7–10]
Loss	5	9 June 2014	ITF Kashiwa, Japan	Hard	(Japan) Makoto Ninomiya	(United States) Yuki Chiang (Japan) Aki Yamasoto	7–5, 1–6, [5–10]
Win	2	7 July 2014	ITF Aschaffenburg, Germany	Clay	(Japan) Rika Fujiwara	(Netherlands) Lesley Kerkhove (Switzerland) Xenia Knoll	6–1, 6–4
Loss	6	12 January 2015	ITF Sharm El Sheikh, Egypt	Hard	(Italy) Camilla Rosatello	(Austria) Pia König (Netherlands) Eva Wacanno	6–4, 6–7^{(2)}, [5–10]
Win	3	19 January 2015	ITF Sharm El Sheikh	Hard	(Japan) Shiho Akita	(Sweden) Kajsa Rinaldo Persson (Norway) Caroline Rohde-Moe	6–2, 7–6^{(3)}
Win	4	7 February 2015	ITF Sharm El Sheikh	Hard	(Russia) Anna Morgina	(Ukraine) Veronika Kapshay (Austria) Melanie Klaffner	4–6, 6–4, [10–6]
Win	5	15 March 2015	ITF Mildura, Australia	Grass	(Japan) Hiroko Kuwata	(China) Tian Ran (China) Wang Yan	6–2, 6–0
Loss	7	25 September 2015	ITF Bangkok, Thailand	Hard	(Japan) Mana Ayukawa	(Japan) Hiroko Kuwata (Japan) Ayaka Okuno	6–2, 1–6, [6–10]
Loss	8	28 November 2015	Toyota World Challenge, Japan	Carpet (i)	(Thailand) Luksika Kumkhum	(Japan) Akiko Omae (Thailand) Peangtarn Plipuech	6–3, 0–6, [9–11]
Loss	9	4 March 2016	ITF Mildura, Australia	Grass	(Japan) Mana Ayukawa	(Australia) Olivia Tjandramulia (United States) Jessica Wacnik	0–6, 3–6
Loss	10	28 May 2016	ITF Karuizawa, Japan	Grass	(Japan) Mana Ayukawa	(Japan) Rika Fujiwara (Japan) Kotomi Takahata	1–6, 4–6
Win	6	23 April 2017	ITF Antalya, Turkey	Clay	(Finland) Emma Laine	(Belgium) Marie Benoît (Belgium) Ysaline Bonaventure	3–6, 6–1, [10–4]
