= Dunlop World Challenge =

- 2017 Dunlop World Challenge

Defunct tennis tournament
- Event name: Dunlop Srixon World Challenge
- Location: Toyota, Japan
- Venue: Sky Hall Toyota
- Surface: Carpet (indoor)
- Website: Official website
ATP Tour
- Category: ATP Challenger Tour
- Draw: 32S/17Q/16D
- Prize money: $50,000+H (2017), €35,000+H
WTA Tour
- Category: ITF Women's Circuit
- Draw: 32S/32Q/16D
- Prize money: $60,000+H

The Dunlop Srixon World Challenge was a tournament for professional tennis players played on indoor carpet courts. The event was classified as a Challenger tournament for men and an ITF Women's Circuit tournament for women. It was held annually in Toyota, Japan, from 2008 until the 2017 edition of the tournament being the final edition.

== Past finals ==
=== Men's singles ===
Year	Champion	Runner-up	Score
2017	(Australia) Matthew Ebden	(France) Calvin Hemery	7–6^{(7–3)}, 6–3
2016	(Australia) James Duckworth	(Japan) Tatsuma Ito	7–5, 4–6, 6–1
2015	(Japan) Yoshihito Nishioka	(Russia) Alexander Kudryavtsev	6–3, 6–4
2014	(Japan) Go Soeda	(Japan) Tatsuma Ito	6–4, 7–5
2013	(Australia) Matthew Ebden	(Japan) Yūichi Sugita	6–3, 6–2
2012	(Poland) Michał Przysiężny	(Japan) Hiroki Moriya	6–2, 6–3
2011	(Japan) Tatsuma Ito	(Germany) Sebastian Rieschick	6–4, 6–2
2010	(Japan) Tatsuma Ito	(Japan) Yūichi Sugita	6–4, 6–2
2009	(Belarus) Uladzimir Ignatik	(Japan) Tatsuma Ito	7–6^{(9–7)}, 7–6^{(7–3)}
2008	(Japan) Go Soeda	(South Korea) Lee Hyung-taik	6–2, 7–6^{(9–7)}

=== Men's doubles ===
Year	Champions	Runners-up	Score
2017	(Australia) Max Purcell (Australia) Andrew Whittington	(Philippines) Ruben Gonzales (Indonesia) Christopher Rungkat	6–3, 2–6, [10–8]
2016	(Australia) Matt Reid (Australia) John-Patrick Smith	(India) Jeevan Nedunchezhiyan (Indonesia) Christopher Rungkat	6–3, 6–4
2015	(United Kingdom) Brydan Klein (Australia) Matt Reid	(Italy) Riccardo Ghedin (Chinese Taipei) Yi Chu-huan	6–2, 7–6^{(7–3)}
2014	(Japan) Toshihide Matsui (Japan) Yasutaka Uchiyama	(Japan) Bumpei Sato (Chinese Taipei) Yang Tsung-hua	7–6^{(8–6)}, 6–2
2013	(United States) Chase Buchanan (Slovenia) Blaž Rola	(New Zealand) Marcus Daniell (New Zealand) Artem Sitak	4–6, 6–3, [10–4]
2012	(Austria) Philipp Oswald (Croatia) Mate Pavić	(Italy) Andrea Arnaboldi (Italy) Matteo Viola	6–3, 3–6, [10–2]
2011	(Japan) Hiroki Kondo (Chinese Taipei) Yi Chu-huan	(China) Gao Peng (China) Gao Wan	6–4, 6–1
2010	(Philippines) Treat Conrad Huey (India) Purav Raja	(Japan) Tasuku Iwami (Japan) Hiroki Kondo	6–1, 6–2
2009	(Latvia) Andis Juška (Russia) Alexander Kudryavtsev	(Kazakhstan) Alexey Kedryuk (Japan) Junn Mitsuhashi	6–4, 7–6^{(8–6)}
2008	(Denmark) Frederik Nielsen (Pakistan) Aisam-ul-Haq Qureshi	(Chinese Taipei) Chen Ti (Poland) Grzegorz Panfil	7–5, 6–3

=== Women's singles ===
Year	Champion	Runner-up	Score
2017	(Romania) Mihaela Buzărnescu	(Slovenia) Tamara Zidanšek	6–0, 6–1
2016	(Belarus) Aryna Sabalenka	(Australia) Lizette Cabrera	6–2, 6–4
2015	(Croatia) Jana Fett	(Thailand) Luksika Kumkhum	6–4, 4–6, 6–4
2014	(Belgium) An-Sophie Mestach	(Japan) Shuko Aoyama	6–1, 6–1
2013	(Thailand) Luksika Kumkhum	(Japan) Hiroko Kuwata	3–6, 6–1, 6–3
2012	(Switzerland) Stefanie Vögele	(Japan) Kimiko Date-Krumm	7–6^{(7–3)}, 6–4
2011	(Thailand) Tamarine Tanasugarn	(Japan) Kimiko Date-Krumm	6–2, 7–5
2010	(Japan) Misaki Doi	(Japan) Junri Namigata	7–5, 6–2
2009	(Japan) Kimiko Date-Krumm	(Serbia) Bojana Jovanovski	7–5, 6–2
2008	(Japan) Ayumi Morita	(Russia) Ksenia Lykina	6–1, 6–3

=== Women's doubles ===
Year	Champions	Runners-up	Score
2017	(Russia) Ksenia Lykina (Japan) Junri Namigata	(Thailand) Nicha Lertpitaksinchai (Thailand) Peangtarn Plipuech	3–6, 6–3, [10–4]
2016	(Russia) Ksenia Lykina (Japan) Akiko Omae	(Japan) Rika Fujiwara (Japan) Ayaka Okuno	6–7^{(4–7)}, 6–2, [10–5]
2015	(Japan) Akiko Omae (Thailand) Peangtarn Plipuech	(Thailand) Luksika Kumkhum (Japan) Yuuki Tanaka	3–6, 6–0, [11–9]
2014	(Japan) Eri Hozumi (Japan) Makoto Ninomiya	(Japan) Shuko Aoyama (Japan) Junri Namigata	6–3, 7–5
2013	(Japan) Shuko Aoyama (Japan) Misaki Doi	(Japan) Eri Hozumi (Japan) Makoto Ninomiya	7–6^{(7–1)}, 2–6, [11–9]
2012	(Australia) Ashleigh Barty (Australia) Casey Dellacqua	(Japan) Miki Miyamura (Thailand) Varatchaya Wongteanchai	6–1, 6–2
2011	(Japan) Makoto Ninomiya (Japan) Riko Sawayanagi	(France) Caroline Garcia (Netherlands) Michaëlla Krajicek	walkover
2010	(Japan) Shuko Aoyama (Japan) Rika Fujiwara	(Romania) Irina-Camelia Begu (Romania) Mădălina Gojnea	1–6, 6–3, [11–9]
2009	(New Zealand) Marina Erakovic (Thailand) Tamarine Tanasugarn	(Japan) Akari Inoue (Japan) Akiko Yonemura	6–1, 6–4
2008	(Finland) Emma Laine (United Kingdom) Melanie South	(Japan) Kimiko Date-Krumm (China) Han Xinyun	6–1, 7–5
