= 2021 Los Cabos Open =

- Date: 19–25 July
- Edition: 5th
- Category: ATP Tour 250
- Draw: 28S / 16D
- Surface: Hard
- Location: Los Cabos, Mexico

Champions

Singles
- (United Kingdom) Cameron Norrie

Doubles
- (Mexico) Hans Hach Verdugo / (United States) John Isner
- Los Cabos Open

The 2021 Los Cabos Open, known as the Mifel Open for sponsorship reasons. was an ATP men's tennis tournament played on outdoor hardcourt. It was the fifth edition of the tournament, and part of the ATP Tour 250 series of the 2021 ATP Tour. It took place in Los Cabos, Mexico from 19 July through 25 July 2021. First-seeded Cameron Norrie won the singles title.

== Finals ==
=== Singles ===
(United Kingdom) Cameron Norrie defeated (United States) Brandon Nakashima 6–2, 6–2

- It was Norrie's first singles title of his career.

=== Doubles ===
(Mexico) Hans Hach Verdugo / (United States) John Isner defeated (United States) Hunter Reese / (Netherlands) Sem Verbeek 5–7, 6–2, [10–4]

== Points and prize money ==
=== Point distribution ===
Event	W	F	SF	QF	Round of 16	Round of 32	Q	Q2	Q1
Singles	250	150	90	45	20	0	12	6	0
Doubles	250	150	90	45	0	—N/a	—N/a	—N/a	—N/a

=== Prize money ===
Event	W	F	SF	QF	Round of 16	Round of 32	Q2	Q1
Singles	€58,705	€42,095	€29,965	€19,975	€12,840	€7,730	€3,775	€1,960
Doubles*	€21,920	€15,690	€10,340	€6,720	€3,940	—N/a	—N/a	—N/a

_{*per team}

== Singles main-draw entrants ==
=== Seeds ===
Country	Player	Rank^{1}	Seed
GBR	Cameron Norrie	32	1
USA	John Isner	34	2
USA	Taylor Fritz	40	3
USA	Sam Querrey	68	4
AUS	Jordan Thompson	71	5
USA	Steve Johnson	83	6
ITA	Andreas Seppi	87	7
USA	Mackenzie McDonald	103	8

- Rankings are as of July 12, 2021.

=== Other entrants ===
The following players received wildcards into the main draw:

- (Croatia) Ivo Karlović
- (Australia) Thanasi Kokkinakis
- (Mexico) Gerardo López Villaseñor

The following players received entry from the qualifying draw:

- (Australia) Matthew Ebden
- (United States) Ernesto Escobedo
- (Colombia) Nicolás Mejía
- (United States) Alexander Sarkissian

=== Withdrawals ===
- (South Africa) Kevin Anderson → replaced by (Sweden) Elias Ymer
- (Lithuania) Ričardas Berankis → replaced by (Austria) Jurij Rodionov
- (Bulgaria) Grigor Dimitrov → replaced by (United States) Brandon Nakashima
- (Australia) James Duckworth → replaced by (Japan) Yasutaka Uchiyama
- (Colombia) Daniel Elahi Galán → replaced by (Ecuador) Emilio Gómez
- (Belarus) Egor Gerasimov → replaced by (Russia) Evgeny Donskoy
- (Belarus) Ilya Ivashka → replaced by (Austria) Sebastian Ofner
- (United States) Sebastian Korda → replaced by (Germany) Peter Gojowczyk
- (France) Adrian Mannarino → replaced by (United States) J. J. Wolf
- (Argentina) Guido Pella → replaced by (Australia) Alex Bolt

=== Retirements ===
- (Austria) Jurij Rodionov

== Doubles main-draw entrants ==
=== Seeds ===
Country	Player	Country	Player	Rank^{1}	Seed
GBR	Luke Bambridge	GBR	Ken Skupski	126	1
ISR	Jonathan Erlich	MEX	Santiago González	126	2
PAK	Aisam-ul-Haq Qureshi	IND	Divij Sharan	135	3
AUS	Matthew Ebden	AUS	John-Patrick Smith	145	4

- ^{1} Rankings are as of 12 July 2021.

=== Other entrants ===
The following pairs received wildcards into the doubles main draw:

- (United States) Ernesto Escobedo / (Mexico) Luis Patiño
- (United States) Mackenzie McDonald / (United States) Sam Querrey

=== Withdrawals ===
Before the tournament

- (El Salvador) Marcelo Arévalo / (Mexico) Miguel Ángel Reyes-Varela → replaced by (Finland) Harri Heliövaara / (Mexico) Miguel Ángel Reyes-Varela
- (Lithuania) Ričardas Berankis / (Finland) Harri Heliövaara → replaced by (India) Sriram Balaji / (Switzerland) Luca Margaroli
- (United Kingdom) Lloyd Glasspool / (United Kingdom) Cameron Norrie → replaced by (Russia) Evgeny Donskoy / (Ukraine) Illya Marchenko
- (Australia) Matt Reid / (Australia) Jordan Thompson → replaced by (Australia) Alex Bolt / (Australia) Jordan Thompson

During the tournament

- (Australia) Alex Bolt / (Australia) Jordan Thompson
