= Cameron Norrie career statistics =

British tennis player

This is a list of the main career statistics of British tennis player Cameron Norrie.

== Performance timelines ==
Key
W	F	SF	QF	#R	RR	Q#	P#	DNQ	A	Z#	PO	G	S	B	NMS	NTI	P	NH

(W) winner; (F) finalist; (SF) semifinalist; (QF) quarterfinalist; (#R) rounds 4, 3, 2, 1; (RR) round-robin stage; (Q#) qualification round; (P#) preliminary round; (DNQ) did not qualify; (A) absent; (Z#) Davis/Fed Cup Zonal Group (with number indication) or (PO) play-off; (G) gold, (S) silver or (B) bronze Olympic/Paralympic medal; (NMS) not a Masters tournament; (NTI) not a Tier I tournament; (P) postponed; (NH) not held; (SR) strike rate (events won / competed); (W–L) win–loss record.
To avoid confusion and double counting, these charts are updated at the conclusion of a tournament or when the player's participation has ended.

=== Singles ===
Current through the 2026 Shanghai Masters.

Tournament	2017	2018	2019	2020	2021	2022	2023	2024	2025	2026	SR	W–L	Win %
Grand Slam tournaments
Australian Open	A	Q2	1R	1R	3R	1R	3R	4R	1R	3R	0 / 8	9–8	53%
French Open	A	2R	1R	1R	3R	3R	3R	1R	4R	1R	0 / 9	10–9	53%
Wimbledon	1R	1R	2R	NH	3R	SF	2R	3R	QF	1R	0 / 9	15–9	63%
US Open	2R	2R	1R	3R	1R	4R	3R	A	3R	1R	0 / 9	11–9	55%
Win–loss	1–2	2–3	1–4	2–3	6–4	10–4	7–4	5–3	9–4	2–4	0 / 35	45–35	56%
Year-end championships
ATP Finals	Did not qualify				RR	Did Not Qualify					0 / 1	0–2	0%
National representation
Davis Cup	A	1R	A	QF (Note: Edition is split into the two years due to COVID-19.)		RR	QF	A	WG1		0 / 5	10–8	56%
ATP/United Cup (Note: The men's ATP Cup was replaced in 2023 with the mixed-gender United Cup)	Not Held			QF	DNQ	RR	HCF	RR	A	A	0 / 4	6–6	50%
Win–loss	0–0	2–2	0–0	2–2	2–1	1–5	5–3	1–1	2–0	1–0	0 / 8	16–14	53%
ATP 1000 tournaments
Indian Wells Open	A	1R	1R	NH	W	QF	QF	3R	3R	QF	1 / 8	19–7	71%
Miami Open	A	1R	1R	NH	3R	4R	2R	3R	1R	2R	0 / 8	4–8	33%
Monte-Carlo Masters	A	A	3R	NH	A	2R	1R	1R	Q1	2R	0 / 5	3–5	38%
Madrid Open	A	A	A	NH	A	3R	3R	3R	3R	4R	0 / 5	7–5	58%
Italian Open	A	Q1	2R	Q1	2R	2R	4R	3R	2R	2R	0 / 7	7–7	50%
Canadian Open	A	A	2R	NH	1R	3R	1R	A	2R	4R	0 / 6	6–6	50%
Cincinnati Open	A	Q1	Q1	1R	1R	SF	1R	A	2R	2R	0 / 6	5–6	45%
Shanghai Masters	A	Q1	2R	Not held			2R	A	3R	1R	0 / 4	2–4	33%
Paris Masters	A	A	1R	A	3R	2R	A	Q1	3R	2R	0 / 5	6–5	55%
Win–loss	0–0	0–2	5–7	0–1	11–5	15–8	6–8	4–5	8–8	11–9	1 / 54	60–53	53%
Career statistics
	2017	2018	2019	2020	2021	2022	2023	2024	2025	2026	Career		
Tournaments	4	16	25	11	25	23	23	18	26	25	196		
Titles	0	0	0	0	2	2	1	0	0	0	5		
Finals	0	0	1	0	6	4	3	1	1	0	15		
Hard W–L	1–1	11–11	15–14	9–12	32–18	32–18	15–16	11–7	21–18	19–17	3 / 123	166–132	56%
Clay W–L	0–0	6–4	4–8	0–1	14–5	11–5	18–7	8–8	9–5	5–6	2 / 49	75–49	60%
Grass W–L	1–3	2–3	2–3	0–0	6–2	6–3	3–2	2–3	4–3	0–2	0 / 24	26–24	52%
Overall win–loss	2–4	19–18	21–25	9–13	52–25	49–26	36–25	21–18	34–26	24–25	5 / 196	267–205	57%
Win %	33%	51%	46%	41%	68%	65%	59%	54%	57%	49%	57%		
Year-end ranking	114	90	53	71	12	14	18	49	27		$15,244,224		

=== Doubles ===
Tournament	2018	2019	2020	2021	2022	2023	2024	2025	SR	W–L
Grand Slam tournaments
Australian Open	A	2R	A	1R	A	A	A	A	0 / 2	1–2
French Open	A	2R	2R	1R	A	A	A	A	0 / 3	2–3
Wimbledon	1R	2R	NH	3R	A	A	A	A	0 / 3	3–3
US Open	1R	2R	A	1R	A	A	A	A	0 / 3	1–3
Win–loss	0–2	4–4	1–1	2–4	0–0	0–0	0–0	0–0	0 / 11	7–11
Career statistics
Tournaments	6	12	4	14	7	5	2	3	53	
Titles	1	0	0	0	0	0	0	0	1	
Finals	1	0	0	0	0	0	0	0	1	
Overall win–loss	7–4	5–12	3–4	11–14	6–7	5–4	0–2	3–3	40–50	
Year-end ranking	182	159	187	149	158	193	–	249	44%	

== Significant finals ==
=== ATP 1000 tournaments ===
==== Singles: 1 (title) ====
Result	Year	Tournament	Surface	Opponent	Score
Win	2021	Indian Wells Open	Hard	(Georgia (country)) Nikoloz Basilashvili	3–6, 6–4, 6–1

== ATP Tour finals ==
=== Singles: 16 (5 titles, 11 runner-ups) ===
Legend Grand Slam (0–0) ATP 1000 (1–0) ATP 500 (1–2) ATP 250 (3–9)	Finals by surface Hard (3–7) Clay (2–3) Grass (0–1)	Finals by setting Outdoor (5–9) Indoor (0–2)

Result	W–L	Date	Tournament	Tier	Surface	Opponent	Score
Loss	0–1	Jan 2019	Auckland Open, New Zealand	ATP 250	Hard	(United States) Tennys Sandgren	4–6, 2–6
Loss	0–2	May 2021	Estoril Open, Portugal	ATP 250	Clay	(Spain) Albert Ramos Viñolas	6–4, 3–6, 6–7^{(3–7)}
Loss	0–3	May 2021	Lyon Open, France	ATP 250	Clay	(Greece) Stefanos Tsitsipas	3–6, 3–6
Loss	0–4	Jun 2021	Queen's Club Championships, UK	ATP 500	Grass	(Italy) Matteo Berrettini	4–6, 7–6^{(7–5)}, 3–6
Win	1–4	Jul 2021	Los Cabos Open, Mexico	ATP 250	Hard	(United States) Brandon Nakashima	6–2, 6–2
Loss	1–5	Oct 2021	San Diego Open, US	ATP 250	Hard	(Norway) Casper Ruud	0–6, 2–6
Win	2–5	Oct 2021	Indian Wells Open, US	ATP 1000	Hard	(Georgia (country)) Nikoloz Basilashvili	3–6, 6–4, 6–1
Win	3–5	Feb 2022	Delray Beach Open, US	ATP 250	Hard	(United States) Reilly Opelka	7–6^{(7–1)}, 7–6^{(7–4)}
Loss	3–6	Feb 2022	Mexican Open, Mexico	ATP 500	Hard	(Spain) Rafael Nadal	4–6, 4–6
Win	4–6	May 2022	Lyon Open, France	ATP 250	Clay	(Slovakia) Alex Molčan	6–3, 6–7^{(3–7)}, 6–1
Loss	4–7	Aug 2022	Los Cabos Open, Mexico	ATP 250	Hard	Daniil Medvedev	5–7, 0–6
Loss	4–8	Jan 2023	Auckland Open, New Zealand	ATP 250	Hard	(France) Richard Gasquet	6–4, 4–6, 4–6
Loss	4–9	Feb 2023	Argentina Open, Argentina	ATP 250	Clay	(Spain) Carlos Alcaraz	3–6, 5–7
Win	5–9	Feb 2023	Rio Open, Brazil	ATP 500	Clay	(Spain) Carlos Alcaraz	5–7, 6–4, 7–5
Loss	5–10	Nov 2024	Moselle Open, France	ATP 250	Hard (i)	(France) Benjamin Bonzi	6–7^{(6–8)}, 4–6
Loss	5–11	Nov 2025	Moselle Open, France	ATP 250	Hard (i)	(United States) Learner Tien	3–6, 6–3, 6–7^{(6–8)}

=== Doubles: 1 (title) ===
Legend Grand Slam (0–0) ATP 1000 (0–0) ATP 500 (0–0) ATP 250 (1–0)	Finals by surface Hard (0–0) Clay (1–0) Grass (0–0)	Finals by setting Outdoor (1–0) Indoor (0–0)

Result	W–L	Date	Tournament	Tier	Surface	Partner	Opponents	Score
Win	1–0	May 2018	Estoril Open, Portugal	ATP 250	Clay	(United Kingdom) Kyle Edmund	(Netherlands) Wesley Koolhof (New Zealand) Artem Sitak	6–4, 6–2

== ATP Challenger and ITF Futures finals ==
=== Singles: 9 (6 titles, 3 runner–ups) ===
Legend ATP Challenger Tour (3–2) ITF Futures (3–1)	Finals by surface Hard (6–3) Clay (0–0) Grass (0–0)

Result	W–L	Date	Tournament	Tier	Surface	Opponent	Score
Loss	0–1	Aug 2016	Nordic Naturals Challenger, US	Challenger	Hard	(United Kingdom) Dan Evans	3–6, 4–6
Win	1–1	Jul 2017	Binghamton Challenger, US	Challenger	Hard	(Australia) Jordan Thompson	6–4, 0–6, 6–4
Loss	1–2	Sep 2017	Cary Challenger, US	Challenger	Hard	(United States) Kevin King	4–6, 1–6
Win	2–2	Oct 2017	Tiburon Challenger, US	Challenger	Hard	(United States) Tennys Sandgren	6–2, 6–3
Win	3–2	Oct 2017	Stockton Challenger, US	Challenger	Hard	(Barbados) Darian King	6–1, 6–3
Loss	0–1	Jun 2014	F7 Herzliya, Israel	Futures	Hard	(France) Yannick Jankovits	4–6, 0–2 ret.
Win	1–1	Oct 2015	F29 Mansfield, US	Futures	Hard	(United States) Alexios Halebian	7–5, 3–6, 6–4
Win	2–1	Jun 2016	F21 Tulsa, US	Futures	Hard	(United States) Ryan Haviland	6–1, 6–1
Win	3–1	Jul 2016	F23 Wichita, US	Futures	Hard	(United States) Jared Hiltzik	6–3, 6–3

=== Doubles: 2 (1 title, 1 runner–up) ===
Legend ATP Challenger Tour (0–1) ITF Futures (1–0)	Finals by surface Hard (0–1) Clay (1–0) Grass (0–0)

Result	W–L	Date	Tournament	Tier	Surface	Partner	Opponents	Score
Loss	0–1	Nov 2016	Columbus Challenger 2, US	Challenger	Hard (i)	(United Kingdom) Luke Bambridge	(Republic of Ireland) David O'Hare (United Kingdom) Joe Salisbury	3–6, 4–6
Win	1–0	May 2013	F11 Newcastle, UK	Futures	Clay	(United Kingdom) Luke Bambridge	(United Kingdom) Scott Clayton (United Kingdom) Toby Martin	6–0, 4–6, [10–3]

== Wins against top-10 players ==
- Norrie has a 14–46 record against players who were, at the time the match was played, ranked in the top 10.

Season	2018	2019	2020	2021	2022	2023	2024	2025	2026	Total
Wins	1	0	0	2	3	4	0	2	2	14

#	Player	Rk	Event	Surface	Rd	Score	CNR
2018
1.	(United States) John Isner	10	Lyon Open, France	Clay	QF	7–6^{(7–1)}, 6–4	102
2021
2.	(Austria) Dominic Thiem	4	Lyon Open, France	Clay	2R	6–3, 6–2	49
3.	(Russia) Andrey Rublev	5	San Diego Open, United States	Hard	SF	3–6, 6–3, 6–4	28
2022
4.	(Greece) Stefanos Tsitsipas	4	Mexican Open, Mexico	Hard	SF	6–4, 6–4	12
5.	(Canada) Félix Auger-Aliassime	9	Los Cabos Open, Mexico	Hard	SF	6–4, 3–6, 6–3	12
6.	(Spain) Carlos Alcaraz	4	Cincinnati Open, United States	Hard	QF	7–6^{(7–4)}, 6–7^{(4–7)}, 6–4	11
2023
7.	(Spain) Rafael Nadal	2	United Cup, Australia	Hard	RR	3–6, 6–3, 6–4	14
8.	(United States) Taylor Fritz	9	United Cup, Australia	Hard	HCF	6–4, 5–7, 6–4	14
9.	(Spain) Carlos Alcaraz	2	Rio Open, Brazil	Clay	F	5–7, 6–4, 7–5	13
10.	Andrey Rublev	7	Indian Wells Open, United States	Hard	4R	6–2, 6–4	12
2025
11.	(Italy) Lorenzo Musetti	7	Washington Open, United States	Hard	2R	3–6, 6–2, 6–3	41
12.	(Spain) Carlos Alcaraz	1	Paris Masters, France	Hard (i)	2R	4–6, 6–3, 6–4	31
2026
13.	(Australia) Alex de Minaur	6	Indian Wells Open, United States	Hard	3R	6–4, 6–4	29
14.	(Australia) Alex de Minaur	7	Canadian Open, Canada	Hard	3R	5–7, 7–6^{(7–5)}, 6–1	37
