= 2022 Los Cabos Open =

- Date: 1–6 August
- Edition: 6th
- Draw: 28S / 16D
- Prize money: 822,110
- Surface: Hard
- Location: Los Cabos, Mexico
- Venue: Cabo Sports Complex

Champions

Singles
- Daniil Medvedev

Doubles
- (United States) William Blumberg / (Serbia) Miomir Kecmanović
- Los Cabos Open

The 2022 Los Cabos Open, known as the Abierto de Tenis Mifel for sponsorship reasons, was an ATP men's tennis tournament played on outdoor hardcourts. It was the sixth edition of the tournament, and part of the ATP Tour 250 series of the 2022 ATP Tour. It took place in Los Cabos, Mexico from 1 August through 6 August 2022. Daniil Medvedev won the singles title.

== Finals ==
=== Singles ===
- Daniil Medvedev defeated (United Kingdom) Cameron Norrie, 7–5, 6–0

=== Doubles ===
- (United States) William Blumberg / (Serbia) Miomir Kecmanović defeated (South Africa) Raven Klaasen / (Brazil) Marcelo Melo, 6–0, 6–1

== Points and prize money ==
=== Point distribution ===
Event	W	F	SF	QF	Round of 16	Round of 32	Q	Q2	Q1
Singles	250	150	90	45	20	0	12	6	0
Doubles	250	150	90	45	0	—N/a	—N/a	—N/a	—N/a

=== Prize money ===
Event	W	F	SF	QF	Round of 16	Round of 32	Q2	Q1
Singles	$125,040	$72,935	$42,885	$24,850	$14,430	$8,815	$4,410	$2,405
Doubles*	$43,440	$23,250	$13,630	$7,610	$4,490	—N/a	—N/a	—N/a

_{*per team}

== Singles main-draw entrants ==
=== Seeds ===
Country	Player	Rank^{1}	Seed
	Daniil Medvedev	1	1
CAN	Félix Auger-Aliassime	9	2
GBR	Cameron Norrie	13	3
SRB	Miomir Kecmanović	33	4
~~ITA~~	~~Fabio Fognini~~	~~54~~	~~5~~
USA	Brandon Nakashima	56	6
AUS	Thanasi Kokkinakis	69	7
ARG	Tomás Martín Etcheverry	72	8
FRA	Quentin Halys	74	9

- Rankings are as of July 25, 2022.

=== Other entrants ===
The following players received wildcards into the main draw:

- (Mexico) Alex Hernández
- (Spain) Feliciano López
- (Mexico) Rodrigo Pacheco Méndez

The following players received entry from the qualifying draw:

- (United States) Nick Chappell
- (Australia) Rinky Hijikata
- (Australia) Max Purcell
- (Japan) Kaichi Uchida

The following players received entry as lucky losers:

- (Colombia) Nicolás Barrientos
- (Argentina) Gonzalo Villanueva

=== Withdrawals ===
Before the tournament

- (Italy) Fabio Fognini → replaced by (Argentina) Gonzalo Villanueva
- (United States) John Isner → replaced by (Spain) Fernando Verdasco
- (Australia) John Millman → replaced by (Colombia) Nicolás Barrientos
- (Argentina) Diego Schwartzman → replaced by (Germany) Yannick Hanfmann
- (Portugal) João Sousa → replaced by (Lithuania) Ričardas Berankis

== Doubles main-draw entrants ==
=== Seeds ===
Country	Player	Country	Player	Rank^{1}	Seed
MEX	Santiago González	ARG	Andrés Molteni	67	1
AUS	Matthew Ebden	AUS	Max Purcell	71	2
URU	Ariel Behar	ECU	Gonzalo Escobar	89	3
RSA	Raven Klaasen	BRA	Marcelo Melo	93	4

- ^{1} Rankings are as of 25 July 2022.

=== Other entrants ===
The following pairs received wildcards into the doubles main draw:

- (Argentina) Facundo Bagnis / (Mexico) Alex Hernández
- ~~(United States) Ernesto Escobedo / (Mexico) Rodrigo Pacheco Méndez~~

The following pair received entry as alternates:

- (Moldova) Radu Albot / (Lithuania) Ričardas Berankis
- (United States) Max Schnur / (Australia) John-Patrick Smith

=== Withdrawals ===
- (United States) Ernesto Escobedo / (Mexico) Rodrigo Pacheco Méndez → replaced by (Moldova) Radu Albot / (Lithuania) Ričardas Berankis
- (France) Quentin Halys / (Portugal) João Sousa → replaced by (United States) Max Schnur / (Australia) John-Patrick Smith
- (Kazakhstan) Aleksandr Nedovyesov / (Pakistan) Aisam-ul-Haq Qureshi → replaced by (Argentina) Tomás Martín Etcheverry / (Chinese Taipei) Tseng Chun-hsin
