= 2017 Los Cabos Open =

- Date: 31 July – 6 August
- Edition: 2nd
- Category: World Tour 250
- Draw: 28S / 16D
- Prize money: $637,395
- Surface: Hard
- Location: Los Cabos, Mexico

Champions

Singles
- (United States) Sam Querrey

Doubles
- (Colombia) Juan Sebastián Cabal / (Philippines) Treat Huey
- Los Cabos Open

The 2017 Los Cabos Open (also known as the Abierto Mexicano de Tenis Mifel presentado por Cinemex for sponsorship reasons) was an ATP tennis tournament played on outdoor hard courts. It was the 2nd edition of the Los Cabos Open, and part of the ATP World Tour 250 series of the 2017 ATP World Tour. It took place in Los Cabos, Mexico from July 31 through August 6, 2017.

== Finals ==
=== Singles ===
- (United States) Sam Querrey defeated (Australia) Thanasi Kokkinakis 6–3, 3–6, 6–2

=== Doubles ===
- (Colombia) Juan Sebastián Cabal / (Philippines) Treat Huey defeated (Peru) Sergio Galdós / (Venezuela) Roberto Maytín, 6–2, 6–3

== Singles main-draw entrants ==
=== Seeds ===
Country	Player	Rank^{1}	Seed
CZE	Tomáš Berdych	14	1
USA	Sam Querrey	23	2
ESP	Albert Ramos Viñolas	24	3
ESP	Feliciano López	27	4
CRO	Ivo Karlović	29	5
ESP	Fernando Verdasco	37	6
FRA	Adrian Mannarino	41	7
USA	Frances Tiafoe	60	8

- Rankings are as of July 24, 2017.

=== Other entrants ===
The following players received wildcards into the singles main draw:

- (Czech Republic) Tomáš Berdych
- (Australia) Thanasi Kokkinakis
- (Mexico) Manuel Sánchez

The following players received entry from the qualifying draw:

- (Australia) Matthew Ebden
- (France) Quentin Halys
- (United States) Evan King
- (Australia) Akira Santillan

The following player entered as a lucky loser:

- (United Kingdom) Brydan Klein

=== Withdrawals ===
Before the tournament

- (Australia) James Duckworth →replaced by (Chinese Taipei) Jason Jung
- (Dominican Republic) Víctor Estrella Burgos →replaced by (France) Vincent Millot
- (Slovenia) Blaž Kavčič →replaced by (United Kingdom) Brydan Klein
- (Russia) Karen Khachanov →replaced by (United States) Dennis Novikov

== Doubles main-draw entrants ==
=== Seeds ===
Country	Player	Country	Player	Rank^{1}	Seed
ARG	Andrés Molteni	CAN	Adil Shamasdin	94	1
COL	Juan Sebastián Cabal	PHI	Treat Huey	99	2
ESP	Marc López	ESP	David Marrero	102	3
IND	Purav Raja	IND	Divij Sharan	105	4

- Rankings are as of July 24, 2017.

=== Other entrants ===
The following pairs received wildcards into the doubles main draw:

- (Australia) Matthew Ebden / (Mexico) Manuel Sánchez
- (Mexico) Hans Hach Verdugo / (Mexico) Miguel Ángel Reyes-Varela
