= 2019 Los Cabos Open – Singles =

Singles
- 2019 Los Cabos Open

Final
- Champion: (Argentina) Diego Schwartzman
- Runner-up: (United States) Taylor Fritz
- Score: 7–6^{(8–6)}, 6–3

Details
- Draw: 28 (4 Q / 3 WC )
- Seeds: 8

Events
Singles	Doubles
← 2018 ·	Los Cabos Open	· 2021 →

Fabio Fognini was the defending champion, but lost in the quarterfinals to Taylor Fritz.

Diego Schwartzman won the title, defeating Fritz in the final, 7–6^{(8–6)}, 6–3.

== Seeds ==
The top four seeds received a bye into the second round.

1. (Italy) Fabio Fognini (quarterfinals)
2. (Argentina) Guido Pella (semifinals)
3. (Argentina) Diego Schwartzman (champion)
4. (France) Lucas Pouille (second round)
5. (United States) Taylor Fritz (final)
6. (Chile) Cristian Garín (first round)
7. (Moldova) Radu Albot (semifinals)
8. (Kazakhstan) Mikhail Kukushkin (quarterfinals)

== Draw ==
=== Key ===
- Q = Qualifier
- WC = Wild card
- LL = Lucky loser
- Alt = Alternate
- SE = Special exempt
- PR = Protected ranking
- ITF = ITF entry
- JE = Junior exempt
- w/o = Walkover
- r = Retired
- d = Defaulted
- SR = Special ranking

=== Finals ===
Semifinals
5	(United States) Taylor Fritz	6	6
7	(Moldova) Radu Albot	3	2
3	(Argentina) Diego Schwartzman	6	3	6
2/WC	(Argentina) Guido Pella	3	6	1

Final
5	(United States) Taylor Fritz	6^{6}	3
3	(Argentina) Diego Schwartzman	7^{8}	6

=== Top half ===
First round
WC	(Mexico) L Gómez	0	1
(Spain) M Granollers	6	6
(India) P Gunneswaran	6	1	6
(Australia) J Millman	4	6	2
Q	(Germany) D Köpfer	3	4
5	(United States) T Fritz	6	6
Q	(France) M Janvier	4	4
WC	(Australia) T Kokkinakis	6	6
(Japan) T Daniel	6	6
(United States) T Sandgren	2	0
PR	(Serbia) J Tipsarević	5	6	0
7	(Moldova) R Albot	7	2	6

Second round
1	(Italy) F Fognini	4	6	6
(Spain) M Granollers	6	3	4
(India) P Gunneswaran	6	3	2
5	(United States) T Fritz	4	6	6
4	(France) L Pouille	6	4	3
WC	(Australia) T Kokkinakis	2	6	6
(Japan) T Daniel	1	2
7	(Moldova) R Albot	6	6

Quarterfinals
1	(Italy) F Fognini	1	6^{1}
5	(United States) T Fritz	6	7^{7}
WC	(Australia) T Kokkinakis	3	3
7	(Moldova) R Albot	6	6

Semifinals
5	(United States) T Fritz	6	6
7	(Moldova) R Albot	3	2

=== Bottom half ===
First round
8	(Kazakhstan) M Kukushkin	7	6
(Bosnia and Herzegovina) D Džumhur	5	2
(France) G Barrère	6^{5}	0
(United Kingdom) C Norrie	7^{7}	6
(Latvia) E Gulbis	6	7^{7}
Q	(Chinese Taipei) J Jung	4	6^{2}
6	(Chile) C Garín	6	2	3
(Argentina) JI Londero	3	6	6
PR	(Germany) C-M Stebe	2	1
Q	(South Korea) S-w Kwon	6	6
(Bulgaria) G Dimitrov	7^{7}	4	7^{7}
(United States) S Johnson	6^{4}	6	6^{5}

Second round
8	(Kazakhstan) M Kukushkin	7	7
(United Kingdom) C Norrie	5	5
(Latvia) E Gulbis	5	0
3	(Argentina) D Schwartzman	7	6
(Argentina) JI Londero	4	6	3
Q	(South Korea) S-w Kwon	6	3	6
(Bulgaria) G Dimitrov	4	2
2/WC	(Argentina) G Pella	6	6

Quarterfinals
8	(Kazakhstan) M Kukushkin	1	2
3	(Argentina) D Schwartzman	6	6
Q	(South Korea) S-w Kwon	6	1	2
2/WC	(Argentina) G Pella	4	6	6

Semifinals
3	(Argentina) D Schwartzman	6	3	6
2/WC	(Argentina) G Pella	3	6	1

== Qualifying ==
=== Seeds ===
1. (South Korea) Kwon Soon-woo (qualified)
2. (Germany) Dominik Köpfer (qualified)
3. (Belarus) Egor Gerasimov (qualifying competition)
4. (Chinese Taipei) Jason Jung (qualified)
5. (United States) Marcos Giron (first round)
6. (Ukraine) Sergiy Stakhovsky (first round)
7. (France) Maxime Janvier (qualified)
8. (Slovakia) Lukáš Lacko (first round)

=== Qualifiers ===
1. (South Korea) Kwon Soon-woo
2. (Germany) Dominik Köpfer
3. (France) Maxime Janvier
4. (Chinese Taipei) Jason Jung

=== Qualifying draw ===
==== First qualifier ====
First round
1	(South Korea) Kwon Soon-woo	6	6
WC	(Mexico) Luis Patiño	1	2
(El Salvador) Marcelo Arévalo	6	6
5	(United States) Marcos Giron	4	3

Qualifying competition
1	(South Korea) Kwon Soon-woo	7^{7}	5	6
(El Salvador) Marcelo Arévalo	6^{2}	7	3

==== Second qualifier ====
First round
2	(Germany) Dominik Köpfer	6	6
(Australia) John-Patrick Smith	2	4
Alt	(Australia) Jacob Grills	6	6
8	(Slovakia) Lukáš Lacko	3	2

Qualifying competition
2	(Germany) Dominik Köpfer	6	7^{7}
Alt	(Australia) Jacob Grills	3	6^{5}

==== Third qualifier ====
First round
3	(Belarus) Egor Gerasimov	4	6	7
Alt	(United States) Dennis Novikov	6	2	5
WC	(Mexico) Juan Ignacio Batalla	1	4
7	(France) Maxime Janvier	6	6

Qualifying competition
3	(Belarus) Egor Gerasimov	6	1	6^{4}
7	(France) Maxime Janvier	3	6	7^{7}

==== Fourth qualifier ====
First round
4	(Chinese Taipei) Jason Jung	6	3	6
Alt	(Mexico) Gerardo López Villaseñor	1	6	0
(Serbia) Danilo Petrović	6	7^{7}
6	(Ukraine) Sergiy Stakhovsky	4	6^{5}

Qualifying competition
4	(Chinese Taipei) Jason Jung	6	7^{7}
(Serbia) Danilo Petrović	4	6^{4}
