= 2021 Los Cabos Open – Doubles =

Doubles
- 2021 Los Cabos Open

Final
- Champions: (Mexico) Hans Hach Verdugo (United States) John Isner
- Runners-up: (United States) Hunter Reese (Netherlands) Sem Verbeek
- Score: 5–7, 6–2, [10–4]

Events
Singles	Doubles
← 2019 ·	Los Cabos Open	· 2022 →

Romain Arneodo and Hugo Nys were the reigning champions from when the tournament was last held in 2019, but chose to play in Gstaad instead.

Hans Hach Verdugo and John Isner won the title, defeating Hunter Reese and Sem Verbeek in the final, 5–7, 6–2, [10–4].

== Seeds ==
1. (United Kingdom) Luke Bambridge / (United Kingdom) Ken Skupski (first round)
2. (Israel) Jonathan Erlich / (Mexico) Santiago González (quarterfinals)
3. (Pakistan) Aisam-ul-Haq Qureshi / (India) Divij Sharan (first round)
4. (Australia) Matthew Ebden / (Australia) John-Patrick Smith (quarterfinals)

== Draw ==
=== Key ===
- Q = Qualifier
- WC = Wild card
- LL = Lucky loser
- Alt = Alternate
- SE = Special exempt
- PR = Protected ranking
- ITF = ITF entry
- JE = Junior exempt
- w/o = Walkover
- r = Retired
- d = Defaulted
- SR = Special ranking

=== Draw ===
First round
1	(United Kingdom) L Bambridge (United Kingdom) K Skupski	6^{4}	7^{7}	[8]
(United States) H Reese (Netherlands) S Verbeek	7^{7}	6^{4}	[10]
(Philippines) T Huey (United States) S Johnson	7^{7}	6^{5}	[11]
(France) S Doumbia (France) F Reboul	6^{2}	7^{7}	[9]
4	(Australia) M Ebden (Australia) J-P Smith	6	6^{6}	[10]
(Finland) H Heliövaara (Mexico) MÁ Reyes-Varela	3	7^{8}	[6]
WC	(United States) M McDonald (United States) S Querrey	6	6
(United States) N Lammons (United States) J Withrow	1	4
(Australia) A Bolt (Australia) J Thompson
WC	(United States) E Escobedo (Mexico) L Patiño	w/o
(Mexico) H Hach Verdugo (United States) J Isner	7^{7}	7
3	(Pakistan) A-u-H Qureshi (India) D Sharan	6^{3}	5
(India) S Balaji (Switzerland) L Margaroli	6	4	[8]
(United States) T Fritz (United States) N Monroe	1	6	[10]
Alt	(Russia) E Donskoy (Ukraine) I Marchenko	6^{2}	5
2	(Israel) J Erlich (Mexico) S González	7^{7}	7

Quarterfinals
(United States) H Reese (Netherlands) S Verbeek	6	7^{7}
(Philippines) T Huey (United States) S Johnson	4	6^{3}
4	(Australia) M Ebden (Australia) J-P Smith	5	3
WC	(United States) M McDonald (United States) S Querrey	7	6
WC	(United States) E Escobedo (Mexico) L Patiño	4	6	[7]
(Mexico) H Hach Verdugo (United States) J Isner	6	2	[10]
(United States) T Fritz (United States) N Monroe	6	4	[10]
2	(Israel) J Erlich (Mexico) S González	4	6	[6]

Semifinals
(United States) H Reese (Netherlands) S Verbeek	6	7^{7}
WC	(United States) M McDonald (United States) S Querrey	4	6^{3}
(Mexico) H Hach Verdugo (United States) J Isner	6	6
(United States) T Fritz (United States) N Monroe	3	4

Final
(United States) H Reese (Netherlands) S Verbeek	7	2	[4]
(Mexico) H Hach Verdugo (United States) J Isner	5	6	[10]
