= 2019 Los Cabos Open =

- Date: 29 July – 4 August
- Edition: 4th
- Category: ATP Tour 250
- Draw: 28S / 16D
- Surface: Hard
- Location: Los Cabos, Mexico

Champions

Singles
- (Argentina) Diego Schwartzman

Doubles
- (Monaco) Romain Arneodo / (Monaco) Hugo Nys
- Los Cabos Open

The 2019 Los Cabos Open (also known as the Abierto Mexicano de Tenis Mifel presentado por Cinemex for sponsorship reasons) was an ATP tennis tournament played on outdoor hard courts. It was the 4th edition of the tournament, and part of the ATP Tour 250 series of the 2019 ATP Tour. It took place in Los Cabos, Mexico from July 29 through August 4, 2019. Third-seeded Diego Schwartzman won the singles title.

== Finals ==
=== Singles ===
(Argentina) Diego Schwartzman defeated (United States) Taylor Fritz, 7–6^{(8–6)}, 6–3

- It was Schwartzman's only singles title of the year and the 3rd of his career.

=== Doubles ===
(Monaco) Romain Arneodo / (Monaco) Hugo Nys defeated (United Kingdom) Dominic Inglot / (United States) Austin Krajicek, 7–5, 5–7, [16–14]

== Singles main-draw entrants ==
=== Seeds ===
Country	Player	Rank^{1}	Seed
ITA	Fabio Fognini	10	1
ARG	Guido Pella	24	2
ARG	Diego Schwartzman	25	3
FRA	Lucas Pouille	27	4
USA	Taylor Fritz	32	5
CHI	Cristian Garín	37	6
MDA	Radu Albot	42	7
KAZ	Mikhail Kukushkin	45	8

- Rankings are as of July 22, 2019.

=== Other entrants ===
The following players received wildcards into the singles main draw:

- (Mexico) Lucas Gómez
- (Australia) Thanasi Kokkinakis
- (Argentina) Guido Pella

The following players received entry using a protected ranking into the singles main draw:

- (Germany) Cedrik-Marcel Stebe
- (Serbia) Janko Tipsarević

The following players received entry from the qualifying draw:

- (Germany) Dominik Köpfer
- (South Korea) Kwon Soon-woo
- (France) Maxime Janvier
- (Chinese Taipei) Jason Jung

=== Withdrawals ===
Before the tournament

- (Argentina) Juan Martín del Potro → replaced by (France) Grégoire Barrère

== Doubles main-draw entrants ==
=== Seeds ===
Country	Player	Country	Player	Rank^{1}	Seed
GBR	Dominic Inglot	USA	Austin Krajicek	86	1
ARG	Guido Pella	ARG	Diego Schwartzman	101	2
MEX	Santiago González	PAK	Aisam-ul-Haq Qureshi	111	3
JPN	Ben McLachlan	AUS	John-Patrick Smith	122	4

- Rankings are as of July 22, 2019.

=== Other entrants ===
The following pairs received wildcards into the doubles main draw:

- (Mexico) Hans Hach Verdugo / (United States) Dennis Novikov
- (Mexico) Gerardo López Villaseñor / (United Kingdom) Cameron Norrie
