= 2019 Los Cabos Open – Doubles =

Doubles
- 2019 Los Cabos Open

Final
- Champions: (Monaco) Romain Arneodo (Monaco) Hugo Nys
- Runners-up: (United Kingdom) Dominic Inglot (United States) Austin Krajicek
- Score: 7–5, 5–7, [16–14]

Events
| Singles | Doubles |
| ← 2018 · | Los Cabos Open | · 2021 → |

Marcelo Arévalo and Miguel Ángel Reyes-Varela were the defending champions, but lost in the first round to Hans Hach Verdugo and Dennis Novikov.

Romain Arneodo and Hugo Nys won the title, defeating Dominic Inglot and Austin Krajicek in the final, 7–5, 5–7, [16–14]. They became the first all - Monégasque pair to win an ATP title.

== Seeds ==
1. (United Kingdom) Dominic Inglot / (United States) Austin Krajicek (final)
2. (Argentina) Guido Pella / (Argentina) Diego Schwartzman (quarterfinals)
3. (Mexico) Santiago González / (Pakistan) Aisam-ul-Haq Qureshi (semifinals)
4. (Japan) Ben McLachlan / (Australia) John-Patrick Smith (first round)

== Draw ==
=== Key ===
- Q = Qualifier
- WC = Wild card
- LL = Lucky loser
- Alt = Alternate
- SE = Special exempt
- PR = Protected ranking
- ITF = ITF entry
- JE = Junior exempt
- w/o = Walkover
- r = Retired
- d = Defaulted
- SR = Special ranking

=== Draw ===
First round
1 | (United Kingdom) D Inglot (United States) A Krajicek | 6 | 7
Alt | (Mexico) L Gómez (Mexico) L Patiño | 3 | 5
(Kazakhstan) M Kukushkin (Brazil) F Romboli | 7^{7} | 7
(Uruguay) A Behar (United States) N Lammons | 6^{3} | 5
4 | (Japan) B McLachlan (Australia) J-P Smith | 5 | 1
(Israel) J Erlich (India) D Sharan | 7 | 6
WC | (Mexico) H Hach Verdugo (United States) D Novikov | 7 | 6
(El Salvador) M Arévalo (Mexico) MÁ Reyes-Varela | 5 | 3
(India) J Nedunchezhiyan (India) P Raja | 3 | 3
(France) G Barrère (France) L Pouille | 6 | 6
(Moldova) R Albot (New Zealand) A Sitak | 1 | 1
3 | (Mexico) S González (Pakistan) A-u-H Qureshi | 6 | 6
(Monaco) R Arneodo (Monaco) H Nys | 6^{14} | 6 | [10]
(Australia) M Purcell (Australia) L Saville | 7^{16} | 4 | [8]
WC | (Mexico) G López Villaseñor (United Kingdom) C Norrie | 1 | 6 | [6]
2 | (Argentina) G Pella (Argentina) D Schwartzman | 6 | 4 | [10]

Quarterfinals
1 | (United Kingdom) D Inglot (United States) A Krajicek | 6 | 6
(Kazakhstan) M Kukushkin (Brazil) F Romboli | 3 | 2
(Israel) J Erlich (India) D Sharan | 6 | 6
WC | (Mexico) H Hach Verdugo (United States) D Novikov | 2 | 4
(France) G Barrère (France) L Pouille
3 | (Mexico) S González (Pakistan) A-u-H Qureshi | w/o
(Monaco) R Arneodo (Monaco) H Nys | 2 | 6 | [10]
2 | (Argentina) G Pella (Argentina) D Schwartzman | 6 | 0 | [6]

Semifinals
1 | (United Kingdom) D Inglot (United States) A Krajicek | 6 | 3 | [10]
(Israel) J Erlich (India) D Sharan | 2 | 6 | [3]
3 | (Mexico) S González (Pakistan) A-u-H Qureshi | 6 | 5 | [5]
(Monaco) R Arneodo (Monaco) H Nys | 3 | 7 | [10]

Final
1 | (United Kingdom) D Inglot (United States) A Krajicek | 5 | 7 | [14]
(Monaco) R Arneodo (Monaco) H Nys | 7 | 5 | [16]
