= 2017 Los Cabos Open – Doubles =

Doubles
- 2017 Los Cabos Open

Final
- Champions: (Colombia) Juan Sebastián Cabal (Philippines) Treat Huey
- Runners-up: (Peru) Sergio Galdós (Venezuela) Roberto Maytín
- Score: 6–2, 6–3

Details
- Draw: 16
- Seeds: 4

Events
| Singles | Doubles |
| ← 2016 · | Los Cabos Open | · 2018 → |

Purav Raja and Divij Sharan were the defending champions, but lost in the semifinals to Juan Sebastián Cabal and Treat Huey.

Cabal and Huey went on to win the title, defeating Sergio Galdós and Roberto Maytín in the final, 6–2, 6–3.

== Seeds ==
1. (Argentina) Andrés Molteni / (Canada) Adil Shamasdin (first round)
2. (Colombia) Juan Sebastián Cabal / (Philippines) Treat Huey (champions)
3. (Spain) Marc López / (Spain) David Marrero (semifinals)
4. (India) Purav Raja / (India) Divij Sharan (semifinals)

== Draw ==
Key

- Q = Qualifier
- WC = Wild card
- LL = Lucky loser
- Alt = Alternate
- ITF = ITF entry
- PR = Protected ranking
- SR = Special ranking
- SE = Special exempt
- JE = Junior exempt
- JR = Junior Accelerator Programme entrant
- CO = College Accelerator Programme entrant
- NG = Next Gen Accelerator Program entrant
- w/o = Walkover
- r = Retired
- d = Defaulted

First round
1 | (Argentina) A Molteni (Canada) A Shamasdin | 3 | 4
PR | (Peru) S Galdós (Venezuela) R Maytín | 6 | 6
(Israel) J Erlich (Sweden) A Siljeström | 6 | 7^{7}
(France) H Nys (Australia) M Reid | 4 | 6^{4}
3 | (Spain) M López (Spain) D Marrero | 6 | 7
(Japan) T Daniel (Bosnia and Herzegovina) D Džumhur | 3 | 5
(Thailand) Sa Ratiwatana (Thailand) So Ratiwatana | 6 | 2 | [4]
WC | (Australia) M Ebden (Mexico) M Sánchez | 4 | 6 | [10]
(Netherlands) W Koolhof (New Zealand) A Sitak | w/o
(Australia) A Santillan (Spain) F Verdasco
(Mexico) S González (United States) S Lipsky | 6^{6} | 6^{5}
4 | (India) P Raja (India) D Sharan | 7^{8} | 7^{7}
(Slovenia) B Kavčič (India) J Nedunchezhiyan | 7^{7} | 3 | [11]
WC | (Mexico) H Hach Verdugo (Mexico) MÁ Reyes-Varela | 6^{3} | 6 | [9]
(Kazakhstan) M Kukushkin (Australia) B Mousley | 2 | 4
2 | (Colombia) JS Cabal (Philippines) T Huey | 6 | 6

Quarterfinals
PR | (Peru) S Galdós (Venezuela) R Maytín | 6^{4} | 7^{7} | [10]
(Israel) J Erlich (Sweden) A Siljeström | 7^{7} | 6^{2} | [7]
3 | (Spain) M López (Spain) D Marrero | 6 | 6
WC | (Australia) M Ebden (Mexico) M Sánchez | 4 | 4
(Netherlands) W Koolhof (New Zealand) A Sitak | 3 | 4
4 | (India) P Raja (India) D Sharan | 6 | 6
(Slovenia) B Kavčič (India) J Nedunchezhiyan | 5 | 3
2 | (Colombia) JS Cabal (Philippines) T Huey | 7 | 6

Semifinals
PR | (Peru) S Galdós (Venezuela) R Maytín | 6 | 2 | [11]
3 | (Spain) M López (Spain) D Marrero | 3 | 6 | [9]
4 | (India) P Raja (India) D Sharan | 6 | 4 | [7]
2 | (Colombia) JS Cabal (Philippines) T Huey | 3 | 6 | [10]

Final
PR | (Peru) S Galdós (Venezuela) R Maytín | 2 | 3
2 | (Colombia) JS Cabal (Philippines) T Huey | 6 | 6
