= 2017 Los Cabos Open – Singles =

Singles
- 2017 Los Cabos Open

Final
- Champion: (United States) Sam Querrey
- Runner-up: (Australia) Thanasi Kokkinakis
- Score: 6–3, 3–6, 6–2

Details
- Draw: 28 (4 Q / 3 WC )
- Seeds: 8

Events
Singles	Doubles
← 2016 ·	Los Cabos Open	· 2018 →

Sam Querrey defeated Thanasi Kokkinakis in the final, 6–3, 3–6, 6–2 to win the singles tennis title at the 2017 Los Cabos Open. It was his ninth ATP Tour singles title.

Ivo Karlović was the defending champion, but lost in the first round to Quentin Halys.

== Seeds ==
The top four seeds receive a bye into the second round.

1. (Czech Republic) Tomáš Berdych (semifinals)
2. (United States) Sam Querrey (champion)
3. (Spain) Albert Ramos Viñolas (second round)
4. (Spain) Feliciano López (quarterfinals)
5. (Croatia) Ivo Karlović (first round)
6. (Spain) Fernando Verdasco (second round)
7. (France) Adrian Mannarino (quarterfinals)
8. (United States) Frances Tiafoe (first round)

== Draw ==
=== Key ===
- Q = Qualifier
- WC = Wild card
- LL = Lucky loser
- Alt = Alternate
- ITF = ITF entry
- PR = Protected ranking
- SR = Special ranking
- SE = Special exempt
- JE = Junior exempt
- JR = Junior Accelerator Programme entrant
- CO = College Accelerator Programme entrant
- NG = Next Gen Accelerator Program entrant
- w/o = Walkover
- r = Retired
- d = Defaulted

=== Finals ===
Semifinals
1/WC	(Czech Republic) Tomáš Berdych	6	6^{5}	4
WC	(Australia) Thanasi Kokkinakis	3	7^{7}	6
(Bosnia and Herzegovina) Damir Džumhur	6	4	4
2	(United States) Sam Querrey	3	6	6

Final
WC	(Australia) Thanasi Kokkinakis	3	6	2
2	(United States) Sam Querrey	6	3	6

=== Top half ===
First round
Q	(Australia) A Santillan	6	6
(Russia) K Kravchuk	0	1
(Japan) T Ito	4	4
(United States) B Fratangelo	6	6
(Chinese Taipei) J Jung	3	3
7	(France) A Mannarino	6	6
(Kazakhstan) M Kukushkin	7^{7}	2	2
(United States) T Fritz	6^{5}	6	6
(Japan) Y Uchiyama	5	6^{5}
(Canada) P Polansky	7	7^{7}
WC	(Australia) T Kokkinakis	7^{7}	7^{12}
8	(United States) F Tiafoe	6^{3}	6^{10}

Second round
1/WC	(Czech Republic) T Berdych	6	6
Q	(Australia) A Santillan	3	1
(United States) B Fratangelo	1	1
7	(France) A Mannarino	6	6
3	(Spain) A Ramos Viñolas	6^{5}	4
(United States) T Fritz	7^{7}	6
(Canada) P Polansky	6	3	6^{4}
WC	(Australia) T Kokkinakis	4	6	7^{7}

Quarterfinals
1/WC	(Czech Republic) T Berdych	4	6	6
7	(France) A Mannarino	6	3	4
(United States) T Fritz	6^{5}	2
WC	(Australia) T Kokkinakis	7^{7}	6

Semifinals
1/WC	(Czech Republic) T Berdych	6	6^{5}	4
WC	(Australia) T Kokkinakis	3	7^{7}	6

=== Bottom half ===
First round
5	(Croatia) I Karlović	6^{5}	6^{8}
Q	(France) Q Halys	7^{7}	7^{10}
(Bosnia and Herzegovina) D Džumhur	6^{4}	6	6
(Japan) T Daniel	7^{7}	3	3
(United States) D Novikov	6	3	3
Q	(Australia) M Ebden	1	6	6
6	(Spain) F Verdasco	6^{6}	7	6
(United States) E Escobedo	7^{8}	5	2
LL	(United Kingdom) B Klein	2	6	1
(France) V Millot	6	3	6
Q	(United States) E King	6	6
WC	(Mexico) M Sánchez	4	4

Second round
Q	(France) Q Halys	3^{r}
(Bosnia and Herzegovina) D Džumhur	5
Q	(Australia) M Ebden	4	4
4	(Spain) F López	6	6
6	(Spain) F Verdasco	6	2	4
(France) V Millot	1	6	6
Q	(United States) E King	4	6	6^{2}
2	(United States) S Querrey	6	4	7^{7}

Quarterfinals
(Bosnia and Herzegovina) D Džumhur	6^{2}	6	7^{7}
4	(Spain) F López	7^{7}	4	6^{2}
(France) V Millot	1	3
2	(United States) S Querrey	6	6

Semifinals
(Bosnia and Herzegovina) D Džumhur	6	4	4
2	(United States) S Querrey	3	6	6

== Qualifying ==
=== Seeds ===
1. (France) Quentin Halys (qualified)
2. (Australia) Matthew Ebden (qualified)
3. (Australia) Akira Santillan (qualified)
4. (United States) Alexander Sarkissian (first round, retired)
5. (United Kingdom) Brydan Klein (qualifying competition, lucky loser)
6. (Ecuador) Roberto Quiroz (first round)
7. (France) Sadio Doumbia (qualifying competition)
8. (United States) Evan King (qualified)

=== Qualifiers ===
1. (France) Quentin Halys
2. (Australia) Matthew Ebden
3. (Australia) Akira Santillan
4. (United States) Evan King

=== Lucky loser ===
1. (United Kingdom) Brydan Klein

==== First qualifier ====
First round
1	(France) Quentin Halys	6	6
WC	(Mexico) Alan Raúl Sau Franco	0	0
(United States) Evan Song	6	6
6	(Ecuador) Roberto Quiroz	2	2

Qualifying competition
1	(France) Quentin Halys	6	7^{7}
(United States) Evan Song	3	6^{2}

==== Second qualifier ====
First round
2	(Australia) Matthew Ebden	6	6
(Mexico) Hans Hach Verdugo	2	1
(France) Hugo Nys	6	2	3
5	(United Kingdom) Brydan Klein	3	6	6

Qualifying competition
2	(Australia) Matthew Ebden	6	7
5	(United Kingdom) Brydan Klein	0	5

==== Third qualifier ====
First round
3/WC	(Australia) Akira Santillan	6	6
Alt	(Australia) Bradley Mousley	4	2
Alt	(Argentina) Andrés Molteni	4	3
7	(France) Sadio Doumbia	6	6

Qualifying competition
3/WC	(Australia) Akira Santillan	6	6
7	(France) Sadio Doumbia	3	1

==== Fourth qualifier ====
First round
4	(United States) Alexander Sarkissian	0	0^{r}
(Croatia) Ante Pavić	6	0
(Canada) Philip Bester	4	4
8	(United States) Evan King	6	6

Qualifying competition
(Croatia) Ante Pavić	6^{6}	1
8	(United States) Evan King	7^{8}	6
