= San Diego Open =

There are three sporting events named the San Diego Open:

- The Sentry (California), formerly the San Diego Open, is a PGA Tour professional golf tournament
- San Diego Open (tennis) is a tournament on the ATP Challenger Tour and ITF Womens Circuit
- San Diego Open (LPGA Tour) is a former LPGA Tour golf tournament
