= 2022 Los Cabos Open – Singles =

Professional tennis tournament

Singles
- 2022 Los Cabos Open

Final
- Champion: Daniil Medvedev
- Runner-up: (United Kingdom) Cameron Norrie
- Score: 7–5, 6–0

Details
- Draw: 28 (4 Q / 3 WC )
- Seeds: 8

Events
Singles	Doubles
← 2021 ·	Los Cabos Open	· 2023 →

Daniil Medvedev defeated the defending champion Cameron Norrie in the final, 7–5, 6–0 to win the singles tennis title. It was his 14th career ATP Tour title, his first of the season, and his first since the 2021 US Open eleven months earlier.

== Seeds ==
The top four seeds receive a bye into the second round.

1. Daniil Medvedev (champion)
2. (Canada) Félix Auger-Aliassime (semifinals)
3. (United Kingdom) Cameron Norrie (final)
4. (Serbia) Miomir Kecmanović (semifinals)
5. (Italy) Fabio Fognini (withdrew)
6. (United States) Brandon Nakashima (quarterfinals)
7. (Australia) Thanasi Kokkinakis (second round)
8. (Argentina) Tomás Martín Etcheverry (first round)
9. (France) Quentin Halys (first round)

== Draw ==
=== Key ===
- Q = Qualifier
- WC = Wild card
- LL = Lucky loser
- Alt = Alternate
- SE = Special exempt
- PR = Protected ranking
- ITF = ITF entry
- JE = Junior exempt
- w/o = Walkover
- r = Retired
- d = Defaulted
- SR = Special ranking

=== Finals ===
Semifinals
1	Daniil Medvedev	7^{7}	6
4	(Serbia) Miomir Kecmanović	6^{0}	1
3	(United Kingdom) Cameron Norrie	6	3	6
2	(Canada) Félix Auger-Aliassime	4	6	3

Final
1	Daniil Medvedev	7	6
3	(United Kingdom) Cameron Norrie	5	0

=== Top half ===
First round
Q	(Australia) R Hijikata	6	4
WC	(Mexico) R Pacheco Méndez	3	0^{r}
(Argentina) F Bagnis	6	6
(United States) E Escobedo	3	1
(Lithuania) R Berankis	7^{7}	7
9	(France) Q Halys	6^{1}	5
(Germany) Y Hanfmann	3	0
(Australia) J Thompson	6	6
(Switzerland) H Laaksonen	3	6	4
Q	(Australia) M Purcell	6	3	6
Q	(Japan) K Uchida	6^{1}	2
6	(United States) B Nakashima	7^{7}	6

Second round
1	D Medvedev	6	6
Q	(Australia) R Hijikata	4	3
(Argentina) F Bagnis	6^{4}	3
(Lithuania) R Berankis	7^{7}	6
4	(Serbia) M Kecmanović	6	6
(Australia) J Thompson	4	2
Q	(Australia) M Purcell	3	3
6	(United States) B Nakashima	6	6

Quarterfinals
1	D Medvedev	6	6
(Lithuania) R Berankis	2	2
4	(Serbia) M Kecmanović	6	6
6	(United States) B Nakashima	2	4

Semifinals
1	D Medvedev	7^{7}	6
4	(Serbia) M Kecmanović	6^{0}	1

=== Bottom half ===
First round
8	(Argentina) TM Etcheverry	7^{7}	3	1
(Australia) J Kubler	6^{4}	6	6
(Moldova) R Albot	6	6^{6}	6
WC	(Spain) F López	3	7^{8}	3
Q	(United States) N Chappell	4	4
(Chinese Taipei) C-h Tseng	6	6
7	(Australia) T Kokkinakis	6	6^{5}	6
(Spain) F Verdasco	3	7^{7}	2
LL	(Argentina) G Villanueva	6^{1}	4
(United States) S Johnson	7^{7}	6
WC	(Mexico) A Hernández	3	6	6
LL	(Colombia) N Barrientos	6	4	4

Second round
(Australia) J Kubler	4	2
(Moldova) R Albot	6	6
(Chinese Taipei) C-h Tseng	3	0
3	(United Kingdom) C Norrie	6	6
7	(Australia) T Kokkinakis	7^{7}	4	4
(United States) S Johnson	6^{3}	6	6
WC	(Mexico) A Hernández	3	5
2	(Canada) F Auger-Aliassime	6	7

Quarterfinals
(Moldova) R Albot	3	6^{4}
3	(United Kingdom) C Norrie	6	7^{7}
(United States) S Johnson	4	6^{3}
2	(Canada) F Auger-Aliassime	6	7^{7}

Semifinals
3	(United Kingdom) C Norrie	6	3	6
2	(Canada) F Auger-Aliassime	4	6	3

== Qualifying ==
=== Seeds ===
1. (Japan) Kaichi Uchida (qualified)
2. (Australia) Rinky Hijikata (qualified)
3. (Australia) Max Purcell (qualified)
4. (France) Maxime Janvier (first round)
5. (Argentina) Gonzalo Villanueva (qualifying competition, lucky loser)
6. (United States) Ulises Blanch (first round)
7. (Colombia) Nicolás Barrientos (qualifying competition, lucky loser)
8. (Tunisia) Aziz Dougaz (qualifying competition)

=== Qualifiers ===
1. (Japan) Kaichi Uchida
2. (Australia) Rinky Hijikata
3. (Australia) Max Purcell
4. (United States) Nick Chappell

=== Lucky losers ===
1. (Argentina) Gonzalo Villanueva
2. (Colombia) Nicolás Barrientos

=== Qualifying draw ===
==== First qualifier ====
First round
1	(Japan) Kaichi Uchida	6	6
(Australia) Matthew Ebden	2	2
(Greece) Michail Pervolarakis	3	4
7	(Colombia) Nicolás Barrientos	6	6

Qualifying competition
1	(Japan) Kaichi Uchida	6	4	6
7	(Colombia) Nicolás Barrientos	1	6	4

==== Second qualifier ====
First round
2	(Australia) Rinky Hijikata	6	6
Alt	(Colombia) Juan Sebastián Gómez	2	3
WC	(Mexico) Luis Carlos Álvarez	1	2
5	(Argentina) Gonzalo Villanueva	6	6

Qualifying competition
2	(Australia) Rinky Hijikata	6	6
5	(Argentina) Gonzalo Villanueva	4	3

==== Third qualifier ====
First round
3	(Australia) Max Purcell	6	6
WC	(Mexico) Emilio Bravo	2	1
(Serbia) Peđa Krstin	6	6
6	(United States) Ulises Blanch	4	2

Qualifying competition
3	(Australia) Max Purcell	6	6
(Serbia) Peđa Krstin	4	1

==== Fourth qualifier ====
First round
4	(France) Maxime Janvier	3	4
(United States) Nick Chappell	6	6
(Argentina) Matías Franco Descotte	1	6^{1}
8	(Tunisia) Aziz Dougaz	6	7^{7}

Qualifying competition
(United States) Nick Chappell	7	7^{7}
8	(Tunisia) Aziz Dougaz	5	6^{5}
