= 2022 Los Cabos Open – Doubles =

Doubles
- 2022 Los Cabos Open

Final
- Champions: (United States) William Blumberg (Serbia) Miomir Kecmanović
- Runners-up: (South Africa) Raven Klaasen (Brazil) Marcelo Melo
- Score: 6–0, 6–1

Events
| Singles | Doubles |
- Los Cabos Open

William Blumberg and Miomir Kecmanović defeated Raven Klaasen and Marcelo Melo in the final, 6–0, 6–1 to win the doubles tennis title at the 2022 Los Cabos Open.

Hans Hach Verdugo and John Isner were the reigning champions, but Isner did not compete this year. Hach Verdugo partnered Hunter Reese, but lost in the first round to Matthew Ebden and Max Purcell.

== Seeds ==
1. (Mexico) Santiago González / (Argentina) Andrés Molteni (semifinals)
2. (Australia) Matthew Ebden / (Australia) Max Purcell (quarterfinals)
3. (Uruguay) Ariel Behar / (Ecuador) Gonzalo Escobar (first round)
4. (South Africa) Raven Klaasen / (Brazil) Marcelo Melo (final)

== Draw ==
Key

- Q = Qualifier
- WC = Wild card
- LL = Lucky loser
- Alt = Alternate
- ITF = ITF entry
- PR = Protected ranking
- SR = Special ranking
- SE = Special exempt
- JE = Junior exempt
- JR = Junior Accelerator Programme entrant
- CO = College Accelerator Programme entrant
- NG = Next Gen Accelerator Program entrant
- w/o = Walkover
- r = Retired
- d = Defaulted

=== Draw ===
First round
1 | (Mexico) S González (Argentina) A Molteni | 2 | 6 | [10]
Alt | (Moldova) R Albot (Lithuania) R Berankis | 6 | 2 | [6]
Alt | (United States) M Schnur (Australia) J-P Smith | 4 | 6^{5}
(Colombia) N Barrientos (Mexico) MÁ Reyes-Varela | 6 | 7^{7}
3 | (Uruguay) A Behar (Ecuador) G Escobar | 3 | 6 | [7]
(Sweden) A Göransson (Japan) B McLachlan | 6 | 3 | [10]
(United States) W Blumberg (Serbia) M Kecmanović | 3 | 6 | [10]
(United States) N Lammons (United States) J Withrow | 6 | 3 | [8]
(Philippines) T Huey (United States) S Johnson | 7^{12} | 6
WC | (Argentina) F Bagnis (Mexico) A Hernández | 6^{10} | 4
(Belgium) S Gillé (Belgium) J Vliegen | 6^{4} | 4
4 | (South Africa) R Klaasen (Brazil) M Melo | 7^{7} | 6
PR | (France) F Martin (Croatia) F Škugor | 6 | 3 | [10]
(Argentina) TM Etcheverry (Chinese Taipei) C-h Tseng | 3 | 6 | [12]
(Mexico) H Hach Verdugo (United States) H Reese | 3 | 4
2 | (Australia) M Ebden (Australia) M Purcell | 6 | 6

Quarterfinals
1 | (Mexico) S González (Argentina) A Molteni | 6 | 6
(Colombia) N Barrientos (Mexico) MÁ Reyes-Varela | 3 | 4
(Sweden) A Göransson (Japan) B McLachlan | 6 | 5 | [4]
(United States) W Blumberg (Serbia) M Kecmanović | 1 | 7 | [10]
(Philippines) T Huey (United States) S Johnson | 4 | 6^{6}
4 | (South Africa) R Klaasen (Brazil) M Melo | 6 | 7^{8}
(Argentina) TM Etcheverry (Chinese Taipei) C-h Tseng | 7^{7} | 6
2 | (Australia) M Ebden (Australia) M Purcell | 6^{3} | 3

Semifinals
1 | (Mexico) S González (Argentina) A Molteni | 6 | 5 | [11]
(United States) W Blumberg (Serbia) M Kecmanović | 3 | 7 | [13]
4 | (South Africa) R Klaasen (Brazil) M Melo | 6 | 6
(Argentina) TM Etcheverry (Chinese Taipei) C-h Tseng | 3 | 3

Final
(United States) W Blumberg (Serbia) M Kecmanović | 6 | 6
4 | (South Africa) R Klaasen (Brazil) M Melo | 0 | 1
