= 2021 Los Cabos Open – Singles =

Professional tennis tournament

Singles
- 2021 Los Cabos Open

Final
- Champion: (United Kingdom) Cameron Norrie
- Runner-up: (United States) Brandon Nakashima
- Score: 6–2, 6–2

Details
- Draw: 28 (4 Q / 3 WC )
- Seeds: 8

Events
Singles	Doubles
← 2019 ·	Los Cabos Open	· 2022 →

Diego Schwartzman was the reigning champion from when the tournament was last held in 2019, but chose to compete at the Summer Olympics instead.

Cameron Norrie won his maiden ATP Tour title, defeating Brandon Nakashima in the final, 6–2, 6–2.

== Seeds ==
The top 4 seeds receive a bye into the second round.

1. (United Kingdom) Cameron Norrie (champion)
2. (United States) John Isner (semifinals)
3. (United States) Taylor Fritz (semifinals)
4. (United States) Sam Querrey (second round)
5. (Australia) Jordan Thompson (quarterfinals)
6. (United States) Steve Johnson (quarterfinals)
7. (Italy) Andreas Seppi (first round)
8. (United States) Mackenzie McDonald (first round)

== Draw ==
=== Key ===
- Q = Qualifier
- WC = Wild card
- LL = Lucky loser
- Alt = Alternate
- SE = Special exempt
- PR = Protected ranking
- ITF = ITF entry
- JE = Junior exempt
- w/o = Walkover
- r = Retired
- d = Defaulted
- SR = Special ranking

=== Finals ===
Semifinals
1	(United Kingdom) Cameron Norrie	6	6
3	(United States) Taylor Fritz	3	1
(United States) Brandon Nakashima	7	6
2	(United States) John Isner	5	4

Final
1	(United Kingdom) Cameron Norrie	6	6
(United States) Brandon Nakashima	2	2

=== Top half ===
First round
Q	(Australia) M Ebden	5	1
(Sweden) E Ymer	7	6
WC	(Australia) T Kokkinakis	6	6^{4}	6^{3}
(United States) D Kudla	4	7^{7}	7^{7}
Q	(United States) E Escobedo	6	6
8	(United States) M McDonald	3	4
(Germany) P Gojowczyk	3	2
(Ukraine) I Marchenko	6	6
Q	(United States) A Sarkissian	7	0	4
(Japan) Y Uchiyama	5	6	6
WC	(Mexico) G López Villaseñor	6^{4}	2
6	(United States) S Johnson	7^{7}	6

Second round
1	(United Kingdom) C Norrie	7^{7}	6
(Sweden) E Ymer	6^{4}	3
(United States) D Kudla	4	6^{9}
Q	(United States) E Escobedo	6	7^{11}
3	(United States) T Fritz	6	6^{9}	7
(Ukraine) I Marchenko	1	7^{11}	5
(Japan) Y Uchiyama	6^{4}	3
6	(United States) S Johnson	7^{7}	6

Quarterfinals
1	(United Kingdom) C Norrie	6	6
Q	(United States) E Escobedo	1	1
3	(United States) T Fritz	6	6
6	(United States) S Johnson	4	4

Semifinals
1	(United Kingdom) C Norrie	6	6
3	(United States) T Fritz	3	1

=== Bottom half ===
First round
5	(Australia) J Thompson	6	7
WC	(Croatia) I Karlović	4	5
(Austria) J Rodionov	3	1^{r}
(Austria) S Ofner	6	3
(United States) B Nakashima	6	6^{5}	6
(United States) J. J. Wolf	3	7^{7}	2
7	(Italy) A Seppi	6	2	3
(Australia) A Bolt	0	6	6
(Ecuador) E Gómez	6	6
Q	(Colombia) N Mejía	4	1
(Chinese Taipei) J Jung	1	4
(Russia) E Donskoy	6	6

Second round
5	(Australia) J Thompson	3	6	7
(Austria) S Ofner	6	4	5
(United States) B Nakashima	6	6
4	(United States) S Querrey	3	4
(Australia) A Bolt	6	6
(Ecuador) E Gómez	3	1
(Russia) E Donskoy	5	6	6^{5}
2	(United States) J Isner	7	3	7^{7}

Quarterfinals
5	(Australia) J Thompson	3	6	6^{4}
(United States) B Nakashima	6	4	7^{7}
(Australia) A Bolt	3	4
2	(United States) J Isner	6	6

Semifinals
(United States) B Nakashima	7	6
2	(United States) J Isner	5	4

== Qualifying ==
=== Seeds ===
1. (United States) Ernesto Escobedo (qualified)
2. (Belgium) Ruben Bemelmans (qualifying competition)
3. (Australia) Matthew Ebden (qualified)
4. (Japan) Yosuke Watanuki (qualifying competition, retired)
5. (Colombia) Nicolás Mejía (qualified)
6. (Australia) John-Patrick Smith (qualifying competition)
7. (United States) Alex Rybakov (qualifying competition)
8. (United States) Raymond Sarmiento (first round)

=== Qualifiers ===
1. (United States) Ernesto Escobedo
2. (Colombia) Nicolás Mejía
3. (Australia) Matthew Ebden
4. (United States) Alexander Sarkissian

=== Qualifying draw ===
==== First qualifier ====
First round
1	(United States) Ernesto Escobedo	7^{7}	6
(Venezuela) Ricardo Rodríguez	6^{4}	3
(United States) Gage Brymer	3	4
7	(United States) Alex Rybakov	6	6

Qualifying competition
1	(United States) Ernesto Escobedo	6	7^{7}
7	(United States) Alex Rybakov	2	6^{3}

==== Second qualifier ====
First round
2	(Belgium) Ruben Bemelmans	7^{7}	7^{7}
WC	(Mexico) Lucas Gómez	6^{3}	6^{5}
(Mexico) Alex Hernández	3	6	5
5	(Colombia) Nicolás Mejía	6	3	7

Qualifying competition
2	(Belgium) Ruben Bemelmans	3	6^{2}
5	(Colombia) Nicolás Mejía	6	7^{7}

==== Third qualifier ====
First round
3	(Australia) Matthew Ebden	6	6
(Finland) Harri Heliövaara	2	2
WC	(Mexico) Oscar Manuel Sánchez Hirales	1	2
6	(Australia) John-Patrick Smith	6	6

Qualifying competition
3	(Australia) Matthew Ebden	6	7
6	(Australia) John-Patrick Smith	4	5

==== Fourth qualifier ====
First round
4	(Japan) Yosuke Watanuki	7^{7}	4	6
(Mexico) Luis Patiño	6^{3}	6	2
(United States) Alexander Sarkissian	6	6
8	(United States) Raymond Sarmiento	4	1

Qualifying competition
4	(Japan) Yosuke Watanuki	5	7^{7}	5^{r}
(United States) Alexander Sarkissian	7	6^{4}	5
