= Thanasi Kokkinakis =

Australian tennis player (born 1996)

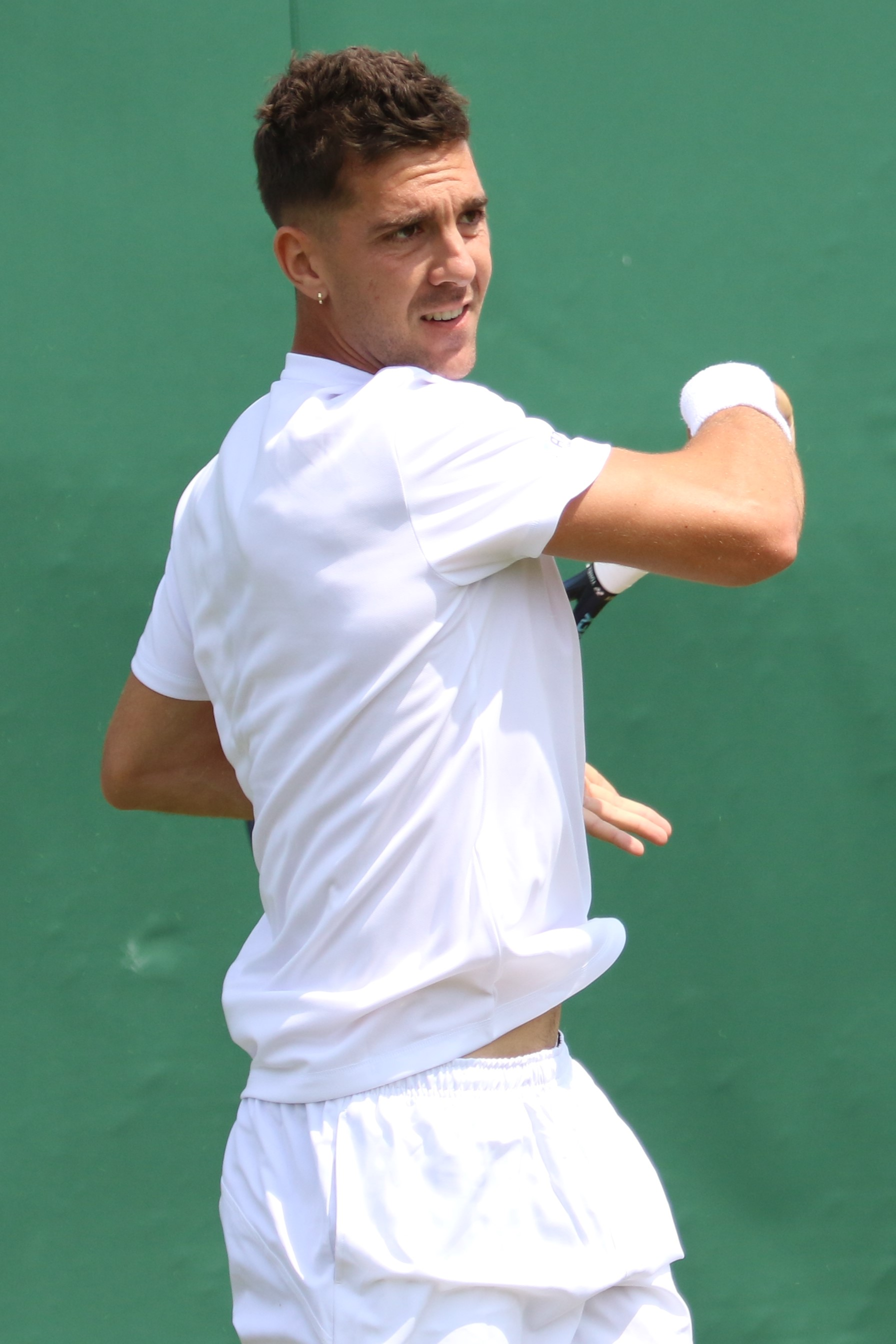
- Kokkinakis at the 2023 Wimbledon qualifying tournament
- Country (sports): Australia
- Residence: Adelaide
- Born: 10 April 1996 (age 30) Adelaide, South Australia, Australia
- Height: 1.93 m (6 ft 4 in)
- Turned pro: 2013
- Plays: Right-handed (two-handed backhand)
- Coach: Todd Ley (2024–present); Todd Langman (2003–2015, 2017–2024); Jason Stoltenberg (mentor; 2015–2017); Lleyton Hewitt (mentor; 2015–2017); Ben Mathias (2016–2017); Brandon Walkin (-present)
- Prize money: US $4,895,632

Singles
- Career record: 81–98
- Career titles: 1
- Highest ranking: No. 65 (6 November 2023)
- Current ranking: No. 491 (29 June 2026)

Grand Slam singles results
- Australian Open: 2R (2014, 2015, 2021, 2023, 2024, 2025)
- French Open: 3R (2015, 2023, 2024)
- Wimbledon: 2R (2022, 2024)
- US Open: 2R (2019, 2024)

Other tournaments
- Olympic Games: 1R (2016)

Doubles
- Career record: 42–37
- Career titles: 3
- Highest ranking: No. 15 (21 November 2022)
- Current ranking: No. 1,305 (29 June 2026)

Grand Slam doubles results
- Australian Open: W (2022)
- French Open: 3R (2022)
- Wimbledon: SF (2026)
- US Open: 3R (2022, 2023)

Other doubles tournaments
- Tour Finals: RR (2022)

Grand Slam mixed doubles results
- Australian Open: 1R (2014)
- Wimbledon: 1R (2018, 2022)
- US Open: 1R (2022)

Team competitions
- Davis Cup: F (2022); Record: 4–5
- Hopman Cup: RR (2018)
- Last updated on: 2 July 2026.

Athanasios "Thanasi" Kokkinakis (Note: /θəˈnɑːsi ˌkɒkɪˈnɑːkɪs/ thə-NAH-see KOK-in-AH-kiss; Greek: Αθανάσιος "Θανάση" Κοκκινάκης) (born 10 April 1996) is an Australian professional tennis player. He has been ranked as high as world No. 65 in singles by the ATP achieved on 6 November 2023 and a career-high doubles ranking of No. 15 attained on 21 November 2022 after winning the 2022 Australian Open and reaching the semifinals of the 2022 Miami Open with countryman Nick Kyrgios.

Kokkinakis has also won one ATP Tour title in singles and produced his best Major singles performance by reaching the third rounds at the 2015, 2023, and 2024 French Open.

As a junior, Kokkinakis was ranked as high as No. 10 in the world. He won one junior Grand Slam title, the doubles title at the 2013 Wimbledon Championships with partner Nick Kyrgios, and was the runner-up in two additional junior Grand Slam singles finals that same year. As a professional, Kokkinakis broke into the top 100 for the first time in 2015, during which he won one title on the ATP Challenger Tour and made the fourth round of an ATP Masters 1000 tournament for the first time at the 2015 Indian Wells Masters. After an injury-plagued 2016, he reached his first two ATP Tour finals the next year, when he won the 2017 Brisbane International doubles title with Jordan Thompson but lost at the 2017 Los Cabos Open in singles to Sam Querrey. In 2018, Kokkinakis won two additional Challenger titles and ended the year having re-entered the top 150. However, over the next two years, further injuries prevented him from regularly competing on the professional circuit, but he made his return in 2021 and he reached two Challenger finals, of which he won one. He continued his comeback in 2022 and appeared in his first ATP Tour final in five years at the 2022 Adelaide International 2, in which he prevailed in front of a home-town audience to secure his maiden ATP Tour singles title. He then won the Australian Open doubles title partnering Kyrgios, and the pair competed in the year-end championships.

== Personal life ==
Kokkinakis was born in Adelaide to Greek immigrant parents, Trevor (Tryfon) from Perivolia Messinia and Voula (Paraskevi) from Panagali Arcadia. He attended Scotch College throughout his upbringing in Adelaide. While competing on tour for his home country of Australia, Kokkinakis also holds Greek citizenship. His tennis idols growing up were Marat Safin and Roger Federer.

In 2023, Kokkinakis was dating Melbourne influencer Hannah dal Sasso.

He is close friends with Nick Kyrgios, with whom he won the 2022 Australian Open doubles title. The pair also competed at the US Open and at the 2022 ATP Finals.

Kokkinakis made his media debut as a commentator on the Australian broadcast of the French Open in May 2025.

== Career ==
=== 2008–2010: Junior career ===
As a junior, Kokkinakis had a breakthrough when in March 2008 he won the 12 year old National Lawn Tennis tournament in Mildura beating Joshua Bray 6–1, 6–2 in the final. This was a big stepping stone after being beaten in the previous 12 year old National Hardcourt Tennis Tournament in January 2008 by Lochlan Greene in straight sets in the round of 16. This tournament was won by Nick Kyrgios. In 2009, Kokkinakis was selected with fellow Australian tennis representatives James Ma, Li Tu and Daniel Talens, on a Tennis Australian European tour. He has said that this tour changed the course of his career.

Kokkinakis received a wildcard into the 2013 Australian Open juniors tournament and eventually reached the final taking down the 12th, 2nd and 11th seeds on his way. In the final he faced fellow Australian Nick Kyrgios. After having two set points in the first set he eventually lost 7–6^{(7–4)}, 6–3.

In June, he returned to competitive play at Wimbledon, and made the third round in the boys' singles and won the boys' doubles with Nick Kyrgios.

Kokkinakis lost the final of US Open Boys' Singles, losing in three sets against Borna Ćorić, 6–3, 3–6, 1–6. Following the result, Kokkinakis reached a career high junior ranking of 10.

Despite still being eligible, Kokkinakis elected not to play junior events in 2014 and instead focused on the men's tour.

=== 2011–2013: Professional career debut ===
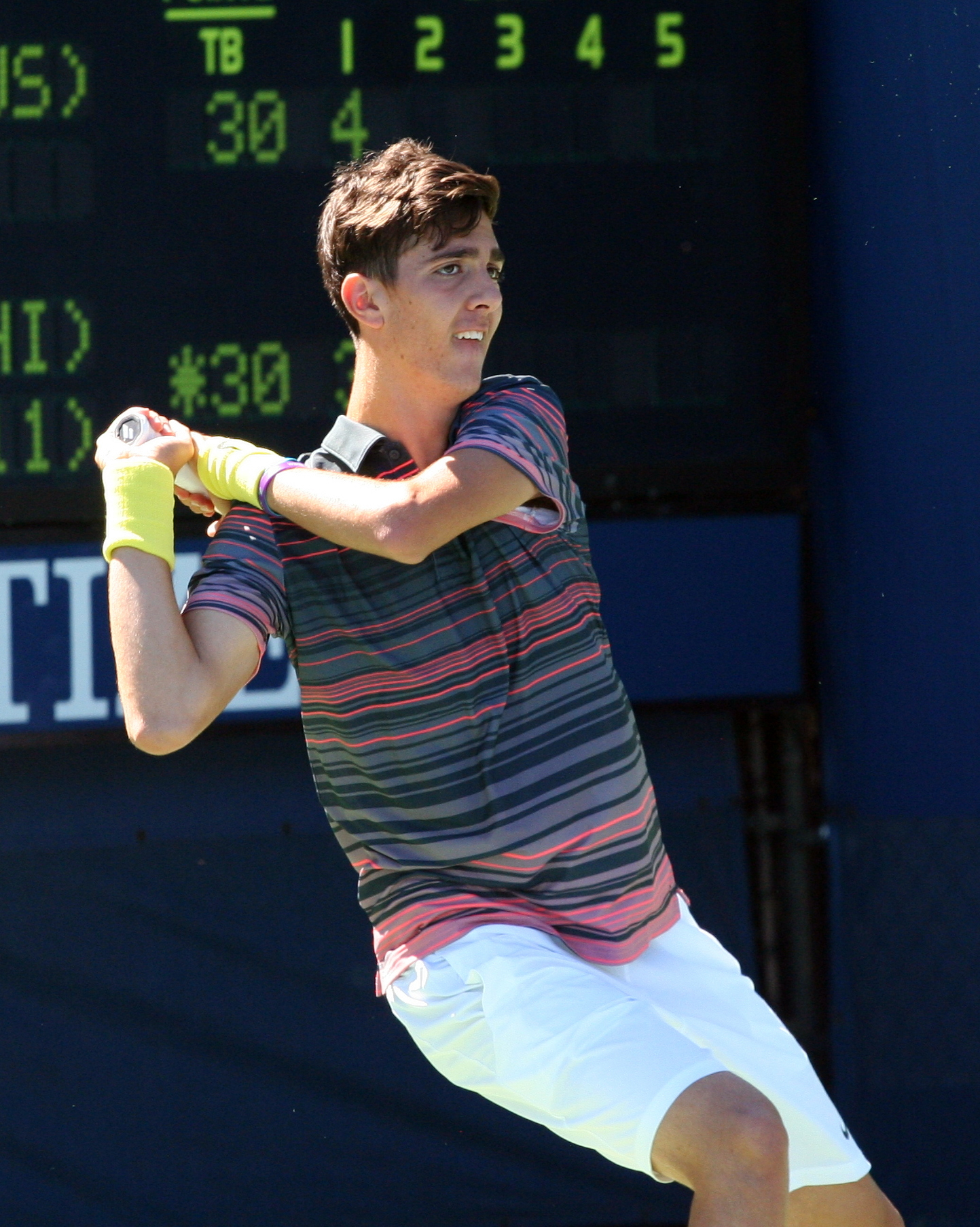
Kokkinakis at the 2013 US Open

Kokkinakis began his professional career in March 2011 at the Australia F3 Future's event at the age of 14 where he lost 6–8 in the third set tiebreak to Leon Frost. He recorded his first professional win the following week against Kento Takeuchi at the Australia F4 event. He then lost in the second round to Michael Venus.

In 2012, after playing Futures events in Australia, Slovenia, Germany and the Netherlands, Kokkinakis equaled his best result of the year by reaching the semifinals of the Belgium F4 event. He then returned to play Futures in Australia where he reached back to back quarterfinals in the F5 and F6 events, losing to Luke Saville both times. He finished the year by reaching the semifinals at the Australia F12 event where he lost to Ben Mitchell.

He began 2013 by filling-in on the United States and German teams during the 2013 Hopman Cup as a replacement for injured John Isner and Tommy Haas. Kokkinakis competed in the qualifying competition of the 2013 Australian Open, losing to Steve Johnson 15–17 in the third set. Kokkinakis sustained a stress fracture in his back in the Australian Open boys' final which kept him out of competition until mid 2013. He then returned to competition playing Futures tournaments in the Czech Republic, Canada and the United States with the highlight being a quarterfinal of the Canada F5 event. In September and October, Kokkinakis competed in two Challenger events in the United States. The first was the 2013 Napa Valley Challenger where he qualified and reached the second round, going down to Bradley Klahn despite leading by a set. Then in the 2013 Sacramento Challenger he qualified and made the second round. He again lost despite leading by a set against Nick Kyrgios. As a result of this, his ranking increased to a career best of number 655. In October, Kokkinakis paired up with Benjamin Mitchell and won the Melbourne Challenger defeating Alex Bolt and Andrew Whittington in the final in straight sets. This increased his doubles ranking by 453 places, which put him up to a career high of number 505. He also reached the second round in the singles. He looked like he would cause a big upset after taking the first set against Matt Ebden before losing the next two sets. He finished his year at the 2013 Traralgon Challenger where he lost in the second round to James Duckworth in straight sets.

Despite missing half of the year due to injury, Kokkinakis finished 2013 with a ranking of No. 627.

=== 2014–2015: Breakthrough to top 100 ===
Kokkinakis began 2014 in qualifying at the 2014 Brisbane International after receiving a wildcard. He qualified and drew fellow Australian and eventual tournament champion Lleyton Hewitt in round one where he went down in straight sets. Kokkinakis was awarded a wildcard into the 2014 Australian Open where he defeated Igor Sijsling in the first round in four sets despite suffering from cramp. He was defeated in the second round by top seed and world No. 1, Rafael Nadal.

Kokkinakis reached the semifinals of the 2014 Heilbronner Neckarcup coming through the qualifying and beating Jesse Huta Galung, Michael Russell and Marsel İlhan. He then lost to top seed Jan-Lennard Struff and missed out on a place in his first ATP Challenger Tour final. Kokkinakis received a wildcard in the French Open qualifying rounds, where he made the final, and despite having match point in the third set, he lost to Ante Pavić, 6–4, 6–7, 5–7. This result improved his ranking inside the top 300 for the first time. Kokkinakis won his first singles title in Canada on 13 July, defeating Fritz Wolmarans in the final. Kokkinakis then qualified for the 2014 Shenzhen Open. He beat Egor Gerasimov before he got beaten in the second round by sixth seed Santiago Giraldo 6–4, 6–3. Kokkinakis qualified for his second career Masters 1000 in Shanghai, but lost to Feliciano López in the first round 7–6, 3–6, 4–6.

Kokkinakis finished 2014 with a ranking of No. 150.

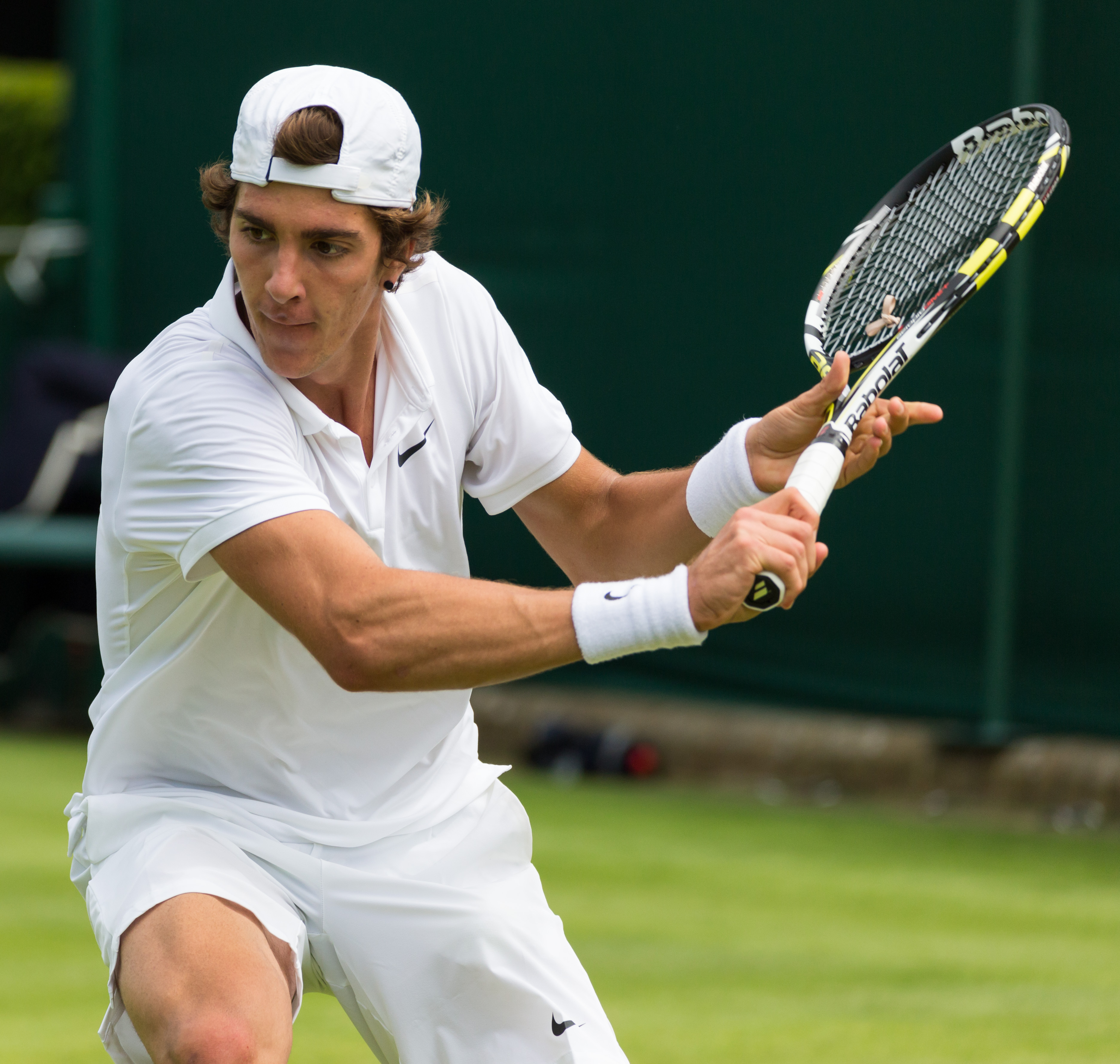
Kokkinakis playing at Wimbledon in 2015

Kokkinakis began 2015 at the Brisbane International where he received a wildcard into the main draw. In the first round he defeated eighth seed Julien Benneteau in straight sets. He lost in the second round against compatriot Bernard Tomic. Kokkinakis and Grigor Dimitrov were also awarded a wildcard into the doubles event. They reached the semifinals, where they lost to Kei Nishikori and Alexandr Dolgopolov.

Kokkinakis received a wildcard also into the 2015 Australian Open, where he defeated 11th seed Ernests Gulbis in the first round, and then lost to compatriot Sam Groth in five sets in round 2. In February, Kokkinakis qualified for three ATP World Tour events; Memphis, Delray and Mexican Open. In March, Kokkinakis played his first live rubber at the Davis Cup. He defeated Czech, Lukáš Rosol in five sets. He was awarded a wildcard into the Indian Wells Open where he defeated Struff, Guillermo García López and Juan Mónaco before losing to Bernard Tomic in the fourth round. Next, he competed in the Miami Open, where he lost in the first round to Carlos Berlocq. Following, he competed in Istanbul Open where he completed three rounds of qualifying, but losing in the round of 32 to Dušan Lajović 6–4, 7–5. Following Istanbul, he qualified for the Madrid Open, and he fell in the first round to Sam Querrey in three sets, however, this improved his ranking and broke him into the top 100 for the first time. He won the Challenger BNP Paribas Primrose (Bordeaux) defeating Thiemo de Bakker, then got a wildcard into the French Open, where he defeated Nikoloz Basilashvili and 27th seed Bernard Tomic in the second round before losing to eventual finalist and world No. 1, Novak Djokovic.

Kokkinakis began his grass court season at the Queen's Club Championships after being awarded a last minute wildcard following the withdrawal of Kyle Edmund. In his opening match he beat Jérémy Chardy, but lost in the second round to Gilles Simon. Kokkinakis was defeated in round 1 of Wimbledon against 24th seed Leonardo Mayer. He also contested the Men's doubles with Lleyton Hewitt and the pair reached the third round before losing to eventual champions Rojer/Tecău. Kokkinakis then played for Australia at the Davis Cup quarterfinals where he lost to Mikhail Kukushkin in straight sets. He was then replaced in the reverse singles by Lleyton Hewitt who secured Australia a spot in the semifinals.

On 12 August 2015, Nick Kyrgios revealed that Kokkinakis had previously slept with Donna Vekić, alleged girlfriend of Stan Wawrinka, while playing Wawrinka at the Montreal Masters. Kokkinakis later responded to Kyrgios's comments, saying "I let him know. I made it pretty clear that he can't be doing that. If he's got a problem, he's got to say it in private. The way he went about it definitely wasn't the right thing." In his first match after the incident, he was involved in an altercation with American Ryan Harrison during their qualifying match at the Cincinnati Masters, with one report alleging that Harrison threatened physical violence against Kokkinakis and insulted his crew.

Kokkinakis finished, 2015, with a ranking of 80.

=== 2016: First injury-plagued year ===
On 24 December 2015, Kokkinakis announced that he would sit out the entire Australian summer of tennis, including the Australian Open, due to an ongoing left shoulder injury. Kokkinakis also missed the 2016 French Open and 2016 Wimbledon Championships. Kokkinakis' first competitive match in 2016 came at the 2016 Summer Olympics, where he lost in the first round to Gastão Elias. On 25 August, Kokkinakis announced he would miss the US Open due to a pulled pectoral muscle. Kokkinakis later announced his injuries were caused by vanity, as he lifted weights to increase his bicep size especially with the news that Nike was bringing out new sleeveless tops.

=== 2017–2018: Return and victory over world No. 1 Federer ===
Kokkinakis' made his comeback at the Brisbane International after receiving a wildcard in doubles with Jordan Thompson. The duo made it to the final, defeating the top seeds en route, where they won the title, the first Australian duo to win the Brisbane International, defeating Gilles Müller and Sam Querrey. Kokkinakis was granted a singles wildcard at the Apia International, where he was scheduled to play Thompson in the first round, but withdrew due to injury. He subsequently withdrew from the Australian Open. In May, Kokkinakis returned to competitive play in doubles with Alex Bolt at Bordeaux Challenger where they reached the quarterfinals. Using a protective ranking, Kokkinakis played his first singles match since October 2015 at Lyon losing to Denis Istomin in straight sets. In June, Kokkinakis defeated Mikhail Youzhny at ‘s-Hertogenbosch. This was his first ATP tour win since August 2015. In the second round, he lost to Daniil Medvedev. The following week, Kokkinakis received a wildcard into Queen's where he defeated Milos Raonic in his opening match in straight sets to record his first top 10 victory. He lost to Daniil Medvedev in the second round for the second consecutive week. Entering the Los Cabos Open as a wildcard, Kokkinakis first defeated world no. 60 Frances Tiafoe in straight tie breaker sets. He then followed that with two more wins over Peter Polansky and Taylor Fritz to reach the semifinals. He then upset the first seed and Wimbledon 2017 semifinalist Tomáš Berdych to reach his first ATP final, losing to Sam Querrey. In August, Kokkinakis lost in round 1 of the US Open to Janko Tipsarević. This was his final match of the year and ended 2017 with a singles rank of 209.

Kokkinakis commenced the year at the Australian Open, but lost to Daniil Medvedev in round one. In March, Kokkinakis lost qualifying for Indian Wells, before qualifying for the 2018 Miami Open where he defeated world No. 1 Roger Federer in the second round in three sets, 3–6 6–3 7–6, gaining the biggest victory of his career. He lost to Fernando Verdasco in the third round, in a close third-set tiebreaker. He suffered another setback when cracking a kneecap at the Monte Carlo Masters.

In May, Kokkinakis lost in the second round of qualifying of the French Open and in June, in the third round of qualifying of Wimbledon. In July, Kokkinakis lost in the first round at Atlanta and Los Cabos, but reached the final of the doubles in Los Cabos. In August, Kokkinakis returned the Challenger Tour and won both the singles and doubles titles at Nordic Naturals. The victory marked Kokkinakis' second singles challenger title and first since 2015.

=== 2019: Second injury-plagued year ===
In January 2019, Kokkinakis qualified for and lost in the first round of the 2019 Brisbane International. Kokkinakis qualified for the 2019 Australian Open, but retired in the first round against Taro Daniel. In April, Kokkinakis returned to the ATP Challenger Tour in Barletta, reaching the second round before withdrawing with an injury. In July, Kokkinakis, returned to the Challenger tour in Winnetka; but withdrew before his semi final match because of an injury. The injury kept him out of the 2019 French Open and Wimbledon.

In July, Kokkinakis was awarded a wildcard into 2019 Los Cabos Open. He defeated Maxime Janvier in the first round to record his first win on the ATP Tour in 492 days; when he defeated Roger Federer at the 2018 Miami Open.

He then backed up that win at the 2019 US Open where he took out Ilya Ivashka in four sets, setting up a second-round meeting with second seed Rafael Nadal. Moments before the match, however, he was forced to withdraw due to a right shoulder injury.

In September, Kokkinakis reached the final of the Tiburon Challenger, where he went on to lose to Tommy Paul in three sets.

=== 2021–2022: Return, Grand Slam doubles champion and ATP Finals ===
For the 2021 Australian Open, Kokkinakis was selected as a wildcard for the men's singles draw after two years of injury setbacks. He won his first main-draw singles match at the Australian Open since 2015 against Kwon Soon-woo in straight sets before losing to fifth seed Stefanos Tsitsipas in a 4.5 hour, epic five set match.

Kokkinakis also qualified for the Miami Masters, where after beating fellow qualifier Shintaro Mochizuki, he lost in the second round to 29th seed Márton Fucsovics in a tightly contested three-set match.

He consistently made a string of quarterfinals at challenger events, reaching the stage in both Split events, the second event in Rome and the first event in Biella. He reached his first Challenger final in almost two years, and won his first Challenger title in almost three at the second Biella Challenger, beating Enzo Couacaud in the final.

After failing to qualify for the French Open, Kokkinakis' next event was Nottingham, where he lost in a tight three-set match to defending champion and top seed Dan Evans.

Kokkinakis was again given a wildcard into the tournament in Los Cabos, a tournament he had made the finals in four years prior. He would lose in the first round to Denis Kudla.

In July, Kokkinakis made the semifinals of another challenger in Lexington, beating Christian Harrison, Juan Pablo Ficovich, and top seed Jenson Brooksby before losing in the semifinals to Alejandro Tabilo in three sets. In September, he reached the final of a second Challenger for 2021 at the 2021 Sibiu Open where he was defeated by Stefano Travaglia. Kokkinakis ended 2021 with an ATP singles rank of 171.

Kokkinakis began his season as a wildcard at home in the first Adelaide tournament, beating John Millman in straight sets and fourth seed Frances Tiafoe after being a set and a break down. He defeated Mikael Ymer in the quarterfinals to reach a first semifinal on the ATP Tour in almost five years. In the semifinal, he was defeated by top seed & eventual champion Gaël Monfils in straight sets. At the second tournament, Kokkinakis bettered his result, beating Benoît Paire, second seed John Isner and fellow Australian wildcard Aleksandar Vukic. He defeated 3rd seed Marin Čilić in the semifinals after saving two match points to reach the second final of his career, the first since 2017. He defeated Arthur Rinderknech in the final in three sets to win his first ATP Tour-level singles title.

Kokkinakis was awarded a wildcard into the 2022 Australian Open, where he lost to qualifier Yannick Hanfmann in straight sets. He received a wildcard into the doubles as well, where he partnered with Nick Kyrgios. Kokkinakis and Kyrgios advanced to the quarterfinals, upsetting top seeds Nikola Mektić and Mate Pavić and 15th seeds Ariel Behar and Gonzalo Escobar on their way there. They beat 6th seeds Tim Pütz and Michael Venus to reach the semifinals. This was the most Australians to progress to this stage at this major in 29 years, including their fellow Australians Ebden/Purcell, and the first time two all-Australian pairs contested the semifinals since 1985. They defeated third seeds Marcel Granollers and Horacio Zeballos in the semifinal to advance to the final. The final against Matthew Ebden and Max Purcell was the first all-Australian doubles final since 1980. Kokkinakis and Kyrgios won their first doubles Grand Slam in straight sets, becoming the first all-Australian men's doubles champions at the Australian Open since Todd Woodbridge and Mark Woodforde triumphed in 1997. As a result, he moved to the top 50 in the doubles rankings at No. 46 on 31 January 2022.

At his next two tournaments in Delray Beach and Indian Wells, Kokkinakis lost in straight sets in the first round to Sebastian Korda. In the doubles at Indian Wells, partnering Kyrgios, he lost to eventual champions John Isner and Jack Sock in the second round. He eventually won a first round match in Miami against Richard Gasquet in straight sets, and saved a match point before recovering to upset 13th seed Diego Schwartzman in three sets for his first top 20 win since beating Roger Federer four years prior. He beat qualifier Denis Kudla in the third round in a third set tiebreak to reach the 4th round at a masters for the first time since 2015 Indian Wells. He lost to second seed and world No. 3, Alexander Zverev, in straight sets in the fourth round. In the doubles, again partnering Kyrgios, he reached the semifinals, beating Granollers and Zeballos a second time on their way. The pair lost to eventual champions Hubert Hurkacz and John Isner in the semifinals.

Kokkinakis played his first clay court tournament of 2022 in Geneva, where in the first round, he upset Fabio Fognini in straight sets, then beat seventh seed Federico Delbonis in three sets to reach the quarterfinals. There, he lost to second seed and defending champion Casper Ruud, in straight sets.

At the 2022 Wimbledon Championships he recorded his first win at this major over Kamil Majchrzak. In the second round, Kokkinakis lost to top seed and eventual champion Djokovic, in straight sets.

In Atlanta, Kokkinakis lost in the first round of the singles against wildcard Andres Martin. In the doubles, he won his second title with Kyrgios, beating fellow Australians Jason Kubler and John Peers. The following week in Los Cabos, as the seventh seed, Kokkinakis beat Fernando Verdasco in three sets before losing to Steve Johnson in the second round.

Kokkinakis and Kyrgios qualified for the 2022 ATP Finals in Turin as a result of being guaranteed to stay inside the top 20 as a pair and having won the Australian Open.

=== 2023: First top 10 win in 5 years & French Open third round in 8 years, top 65 ===
Kokkinakis started his year in Adelaide. At the first tournament, he lost in the second round to sixth seed and world No. 15, Jannik Sinner. At the second tournament, he beat top seed and world No. 6, Andrey Rublev, in the second round in three sets for his first top-ten win since beating Federer five years prior. He reached the semifinals where he lost to fourth seed and world No. 26, Roberto Bautista Agut, in three sets. Due to not defending his title, his ranking fell to No. 159. At the Australian Open, he beat Fabio Fognini in the first round in straight sets to reach the second round in Melbourne for the fourth time in his career. In the second round, he lost to former World No. 1 and five-time finalist, Andy Murray, in a five-set match which lasted five hours and 45 minutes that ended after 4 AM, the third latest finish in the history at ATP tour level and the longest match of Kokkinakis and Murray's 18-year career and of the season.

Seeded eighth at the Bahrain Ministry of Interior Tennis Challenger, Kokkinakis won his sixth ATP Challenger title by beating Abedallah Shelbayh in the final. As a result of winning that tournament, he returned to the top 100 and received a wildcard into the Dubai Championships. Here, he was defeated in the second round by eighth seed and world No. 20, Borna Ćorić. In March, he competed at the BNP Paribas Open in Indian Wells. Getting past qualifying, he lost in the second round to top seed, world No. 2, and eventual champion, Carlos Alcaraz. At the 2023 Miami Open, entering the main draw as lucky loser, he lost also in the second round to eighth seed Hubert Hurkacz, after having five match points, playing in the longest best-of-three match of the season thus far, lasting 3 hours and 31 minutes with three tiebreaks.

Kokkinakis lost in the first round in Madrid but reached the second round in Rome. After receiving a wildcard into the French Open, he beat 20th seed Dan Evans in straight sets to record his biggest win at a Grand Slam since 2015. He then defeated Stan Wawrinka in five sets in the second round needing five match points to return to the third round of the French Open for the first time in 8 years. He lost to 11th seed Karen Khachanov in 4 sets, despite having 3 set points in set 4 and a 4–1 lead in the 4th set tiebreak. As a result of his run, Kokkinakis returned to the top 100 for the first time since his victory in Manama, Bahrain earlier in the season.

Kokkinakis' grass court season and American swing was less successful, losing round 1 in Nottingham and the qualifying rounds of Wimbledon on grass. In his first tournament in North America at Granby, he beat qualifier Patrick Kypson from a break down in the third set, but retired in the second round against James Trotter. In Atlanta, Kokkinakis beat Gaël Monfils in 3 sets, but lost in straight sets in the second round to 2nd seed Alex de Minaur. At his next tournament in Washington, Kokkinakis defeated Taro Daniel in the first round before losing in the second round to 13th seed Ugo Humbert. Kokkinakis then qualified for two successive masters tournaments in Montreal, where he then defeated Zhang Zhizhen in the first round before losing to Lorenzo Musetti and Cincinnati, where he again faced Hurkacz, losing in 3 sets once again, including a final set tiebreak. At the US Open, Kokkinakis lost in the first round to qualifier Hsu Yu-hsiou.

Kokkinakis then played two ties for Australia at the 2023 Davis Cup Finals, where he won in straight sets against Dominic Stricker, but lost in 3 sets to Jack Draper.

After the Davis Cup, Kokkinakis' next tournament was Shanghai, where he defeated Fabio Fognini in the first round, but lost once again to Hurkacz, who would go on to win the event, in straight sets. After Shanghai, Kokkinakis played the Shenzhen Challenger, where he defeated Colin Sinclair in straight sets, but was upset in the second round by Beibit Zhukayev. Despite this, for the first time since 2015, Kokkinakis improved his career-best ranking, rising one spot to No. 68 in the world.

Kokkinakis then played Challengers in Playford, where he retired in the second round against eventual finalist Coleman Wong, and Sydney, where he retired in the semifinals against Marc Polmans. Kokkinakis again improved his singles ranking to world No. 65 in the world as a result of his participation in the events.

=== 2024: Top 20 wins, Challenger & Davis Cup success ===
Starting his season in Australia, Kokkinakis lost out in the first rounds of Brisbane & Adelaide. He then made the second round of the Australian Open after defeating Sebastian Ofner in a 4 hour, 5 set thriller. He then lost out to Grigor Dimitrov in 4 sets.

He then made the quarter-finals of the Los Cabos Open, however lost out to Alexander Zverev in straights.

In April, Kokkinakis won the Sarasota Open (Challenger), defeating Zizou Bergs in the final. This secured him entry into Roland Garros, where he played 3 successive 5 set matches. The first against Alexei Popyrin, then he came back from 2 sets down to defeat Giulio Zeppieri, however Kokkinakis then lost out to Taylor Fritz in the third round, in 5.

Then, at Wimbledon, in the first round, Kokkinakis earned argubly the best win of his season, defeating World No. 17 Felix Auger-Aliassime, coming back from 2 sets down and saving 4 match points in the third set. He then retired in the second round against Lucas Pouille due to an ongoing knee injury.

Then in Washington, in the third round, Kokkinakis had 2 match points against the eventual champion Sebastian Korda in the second set, however had to retire in the third due to cramps. He then lost out to Hubert Hurkacz in the second round of the National Bank Open in Montreal, despite being two points away from victory in the deciding set tiebreak.

At the US Open, Kokkinakis defeated World No. 11 Stefanos Tsitsipas in 4 sets in the first round, his best win by ranking in his 2024 season, this was also his first win at the tournament since 2019. He then lost out to Nuno Borges in straights.

In the Davis Cup (Group Stages), Kokkinakis defeated France's Arthur Fils in straights, and Czechia's Jakub Mensik in 3 sets. This aided Australia's qualification for the Davis Cup Finals. He was also selected to play in the Laver Cup, however lost out his only match to Tsitsipas in straights.

Kokkinakis then won the NSW Open (Challenger) without dropping a set, defeating Rinky Hijikata in the final.

At the Davis Cup Finals, in the quarter-final, Kokkinakis defeated USA's Ben Shelton in a 3-set epic, with the match being decided by a 30 point final set tiebreak. Kokkinakis saved 3 match points and converted on his 7th. In the semi-final, Kokkinakis lost out to Italy's Matteo Berrettini in another 3 set match. Australia subsequently lost out to Italy, who went on to win the Davis Cup. This brought Kokkinakis' 2024 season to an end.

=== 2025: Injury, Surgery, Out for Whole Season ===
Kokkinakis began his season in Adelaide, where he made it to the quarter finals, defeating Yoshihito Nishioka & Tomás Martín Etcheverry both in 3 sets. He then withdrew with a shoulder/pectoral issue.

At the Australian Open, Kokkinakis defeated Roman Safiullin in the first round in 4 sets. In the second round, he lost out to Jack Draper in 5 sets. The match lasted 4 hours 35 minutes. In the doubles, Kokkinakis teamed up with long-term partner and friend Nick Kyrgios. The wildcard pair retired in the second set of their first round encounter against James Duckworth & Aleksandar Vukic, again, due to Kokkinakis' ongoing pectoral injury.

In February, Kokkinakis underwent a "very complicated" surgery on his right pectoral muscle, which put him out for the rest of the season.

=== 2026: Return to Tour, Wimbledon doubles semi-final, further injury woes ===
Kokkinakis & Kyrgios received wildcard entry into the Brisbane International, where they won their first match together since 2022 against Matthew Ebden & Rajeev Ram. The pair then lost out to Sadio Doumbia & Fabien Reboul.

Using his protected ranking, Kokkinakis entered the Adelaide International, where he defeated Sebastian Korda in a final set tiebreak He then withdrew from his second round encounter due to his shoulder injury.

Kokkinakis then withdrew from the Australian Open singles, instead focusing on doubles with Kyrgios. In the doubles, the wildcard pair lost out to eventual finalists Jason Kubler & Marc Polmans in a 3rd set tiebreaker.

In May, Kokkinakis again used his protected ranking to enter Roland-Garros, and won his first round match in 5 sets against Terence Atmane. The contest lasted 4 hours 18 minutes. He then retired in the third set of his second round encounter against Pablo Carreño Busta, due to his shoulder injury.

At Wimbledon, he lost in the first round of singles to Alexander Bublik in 5 sets. In doubles, teamed up with Aleksandar Kovacevic and entering as alternates, the pair saved a match point against Maximo & Santiago González to progress into the second round. They then defeated 12th seeds JJ Tracy & Robert Cash in straights in the second round. They defeated 5th seeds Christian Harrison & Neal Skupski in the third round, and then Nikola Mektić & Austin Krajicek in the quarter-finals to reach his second ever Grand Slam semi-final. Kokkinakis & Kovacevic then lost out to top seeds and eventual champions Henry Patten & Harri Heliövaara.

== Performance timelines ==
Key
W	F	SF	QF	#R	RR	Q#	P#	DNQ	A	Z#	PO	G	S	B	NMS	NTI	P	NH

(W) winner; (F) finalist; (SF) semifinalist; (QF) quarterfinalist; (#R) rounds 4, 3, 2, 1; (RR) round-robin stage; (Q#) qualification round; (P#) preliminary round; (DNQ) did not qualify; (A) absent; (Z#) Davis/Fed Cup Zonal Group (with number indication) or (PO) play-off; (G) gold, (S) silver or (B) bronze Olympic/Paralympic medal; (NMS) not a Masters tournament; (NTI) not a Tier I tournament; (P) postponed; (NH) not held; (SR) strike rate (events won / competed); (W–L) win–loss record.
To avoid confusion and double counting, these charts are updated at the conclusion of a tournament or when the player's participation has ended.

=== Singles ===
Current through the 2026 US Open.

Tournament	2013	2014	2015	2016	2017	2018	2019	2020	2021	2022	2023	2024	2025	2026	SR	W–L	Win%
Grand Slam tournaments
Australian Open	Q1	2R	2R	A	A	1R	1R	A	2R	1R	2R	2R	2R	A	0 / 9	6–9	40%
French Open	A	Q3	3R	A	1R	Q2	A	A	Q1	1R	3R	3R	A	2R	0 / 6	7–6	54%
Wimbledon	A	A	1R	A	1R	Q3	A	NH	Q1	2R	Q1	2R	A	1R	0 / 5	2–5	29%
US Open	A	Q2	1R	A	1R	Q2	2R	A	Q2	1R	1R	2R	A	A	0 / 6	2–5	29%
Win–loss	0–0	1–1	3–4	0–0	0–3	0–1	1–1	0–0	1–1	1–4	3–3	5–4	1–1	1–2	0 / 26	17–25	40%
National representation
Summer Olympics	not held			1R	not held				A	not held		A	not held		0 / 1	0–1	0%
Davis Cup	A	1R	SF	A	A	A	A	A	A	F	F	SF	A		0 / 5	8–8	50%
ATP Masters 1000
Indian Wells Open	A	Q1	4R	A	A	Q1	A	NH	Q1	1R	2R	2R	A	A	0 / 4	5–4	60%
Miami Open	A	A	1R	A	A	3R	A	NH	2R	4R	2R	Q1	A	A	0 / 5	7–5	64%
Monte-Carlo Masters	A	A	A	A	A	1R	A	NH	A	A	A	A	A	A	0 / 1	0–1	0%
Madrid Open	A	A	1R	A	A	A	A	NH	A	A	1R	1R	A	A	0 / 3	0–3	0%
Italian Open	A	A	A	A	A	A	A	A	A	Q1	2R	Q1	A	A	0 / 1	1–1	0%
Canadian Open	A	1R	Q1	A	A	A	A	NH	A	A	2R	2R	A	Q1	0 / 3	2–3	40%
Cincinnati Open	A	A	2R	A	A	A	A	A	A	1R	1R	A	A	1R	0 / 4	1–4	20%
Shanghai Masters	A	1R	A	A	A	A	A	not held			2R	A	A		0 / 2	1–2	0%
Paris Masters	A	A	A	A	A	A	A	A	A	A	A	A	A		0 / 0	0–0	–
Win–loss	0–0	0–2	4–4	0–0	0–0	2–2	0–0	0–0	1–1	3–3	5–7	2–3	0–0	0–1	0 / 23	17–23	43%
Career statistics
	2013	2014	2015	2016	2017	2018	2019	2020	2021	2022	2023	2024	2025	2026	Career		
Tournaments	0	6	17	1	7	6	4	0	4	15	15	14	2	4	95		
Titles	0	0	0	0	0	0	0	0	0	1	0	0	0	0	1		
Finals	0	0	0	0	1	0	0	0	0	1	0	0	0	0	2		
Hard win–loss	0–0	2–6	10–13	0–1	4–2	3–5	3–3	0–0	2–4	14–14	13–13	11–11	3–1	1–1	1 / 71	66–74	47%
Clay win–loss	0–0	0–1	2–3	0–0	0–2	0–1	0–0	0–0	0–0	2–2	3–3	2–4	0–0	1–1	0 / 16	10–17	37%
Grass win–loss	0–0	0–0	1–3	0–0	2–3	0–0	0–0	0–0	0–0	1–1	0–0	1–1	0–0	0–1	0 / 8	5–9	36%
Overall win–loss	0–0	2–7	13–19	0–1	6–7	3–6	3–3	0–0	2–4	17–17	16–16	14–16	3–1	2–3	1 / 95	81–100	45%
Win %	–	22%	41%	0%	46%	33%	50%	–	33%	50%	50%	47%	75%	40%	45%		
Year-end ranking	628	150	80	–	209	146	199	260	171	93	65	77	454				

Kokkinakis withdrew before the second round of the 2019 US Open which does not count as a loss.

=== Doubles ===
Current through the 2026 French Open.

Tournament	2013	2014	2015	2016	2017	2018	2019	2020	2021	2022	2023	2024	2025	2026	SR	W–L	Win %
Grand Slam tournaments
Australian Open	1R	1R	1R	A	A	1R	A	A	2R	W	A	1R	1R	1R	1 / 9	7–8	47%
French Open	A	A	2R	A	A	A	A	A	A	3R	1R	A	A	A	0 / 3	3–3	50%
Wimbledon	A	A	3R	A	2R	A	A	NH	A	A	A	A	A	SF	0 / 3	7–3	70%
US Open	A	A	A	A	A	A	A	A	A	3R	3R	1R	A		0 / 3	4–3	57%
Win–loss	0–1	0–1	3–3	0–0	1–1	0–1	0–0	0–0	1–1	10–2	2–2	0–2	0–1	4–2	1 / 18	21–17	55%
Year-end championship
ATP Finals	did not qualify									RR	DNQ				0 / 1	1–2	33%
ATP Masters 1000
Indian Wells Open	A	A	2R	A	A	A	A	NH	A	2R	A	A	A	A	0 / 2	2–2	50%
Miami Open	A	A	A	A	A	A	A	NH	A	SF	A	2R	A	A	0 / 2	3–2	60%
Italian Open	A	A	A	A	A	A	A	A	A	2R	A	A	A	A	0 / 1	1–1	50%
Cincinnati Open	A	A	A	A	A	A	A	A	A	2R	A	A	A		0 / 1	1–1	50%
Win–loss	0–0	0–0	1–1	0–0	0–0	0–0	0–0	0–0	0–0	5–4	0–0	1–1	0–0	0–0	0 / 6	7–6	54%
Career statistics
Titles	0	0	0	0	1	0	0	0	0	2	0	0	0	0	3		
Finals	0	0	0	0	1	1	0	0	0	2	0	0	0	0	4		
Overall win–loss	0–1	1–2	6–8	0–0	5–3	3–3	0–0	0–0	1–1	22–10	2–3	1–3	0–1	1–2	42–37		
Win %	0%	33%	43%	–	63%	50%	–	–	50%	69%	40%	25%	0%	50%	53%		
Year-end ranking	492	333	168	–	178	198	958	1012	433	15	337	453	–				

== Significant finals ==
=== Grand Slam tournaments ===
==== Doubles: 1 (1 title) ====
Result	Year	Tournament	Surface	Partner	Opponents	Score
Win	2022	Australian Open	Hard	(Australia) Nick Kyrgios	(Australia) Matthew Ebden (Australia) Max Purcell	7–5, 6–4

== ATP Tour finals ==
=== Singles: 2 (1 title, 1 runner-up) ===
Legend Grand Slam (0–0) ATP Finals (0–0) ATP Masters 1000 (0–0) ATP 500 (0–0) ATP 250 (1–1)	Finals by surface Hard (1–1) Clay (0–0) Grass (0–0)	Finals by setting Outdoor (1–1) Indoor (0–0)

Result	W–L	Date	Tournament	Tier	Surface	Opponent	Score
Loss	0–1	Aug 2017	Los Cabos Open, Mexico	ATP 250	Hard	(United States) Sam Querrey	3–6, 6–3, 2–6
Win	1–1	Jan 2022	Adelaide International, Australia	ATP 250	Hard	(France) Arthur Rinderknech	6–7^{(6–8)}, 7–6^{(7–5)}, 6–3

=== Doubles: 4 (3 titles, 1 runner-up) ===
Legend Grand Slam (1–0) ATP Finals (0–0) ATP Masters 1000 (0–0) ATP 500 (0–0) ATP 250 (2–1)	Finals by surface Hard (3–1) Clay (0–0) Grass (0–0)	Finals by setting Outdoor (3–1) Indoor (0–0)

Result	W–L	Date	Tournament	Tier	Surface	Partner	Opponents	Score
Win	1–0	Jan 2017	Brisbane International, Australia	ATP 250	Hard	(Australia) Jordan Thompson	(Luxembourg) Gilles Müller (United States) Sam Querrey	7–6^{(9–7)}, 6–4
Loss	1–1	Aug 2018	Los Cabos Open, Mexico	ATP 250	Hard	(United States) Taylor Fritz	(El Salvador) Marcelo Arévalo (Mexico) Miguel Ángel Reyes-Varela	4–6, 4–6
Win	2–1	Jan 2022	Australian Open, Australia	Grand Slam	Hard	(Australia) Nick Kyrgios	(Australia) Matthew Ebden (Australia) Max Purcell	7–5, 6–4
Win	3–1	Jul 2022	Atlanta Open, United States	ATP 250	Hard	(Australia) Nick Kyrgios	(Australia) Jason Kubler (Australia) John Peers	7–6^{(7–4)}, 7–5

== Team competition finals ==
=== Team competitions finals: 2 (2 runner-ups) ===
Finals by tournament Davis Cup (0–1) Laver Cup (0–1) United Cup (0–0)	Finals by team Australia (0–1) World (0–1)

Result	Date	Tournament	Surface	Team	Partners	Opponent team	Opponents	Score
Loss	Nov 2022	Davis Cup, Málaga, Spain	Hard (i)	Australia	Alex de Minaur; Jordan Thompson; Max Purcell; Matthew Ebden	Canada	Félix Auger-Aliassime; Denis Shapovalov; Vasek Pospisil; Alexis Galarneau; Gabriel Diallo	0–2
Loss	Sep 2024	Laver Cup, Berlin	Hard (i)	Team World	Taylor Fritz; Frances Tiafoe; Ben Shelton; Alejandro Tabilo; Francisco Cerúndolo	Team Europe	Alexander Zverev; Carlos Alcaraz; Daniil Medvedev; Casper Ruud; Grigor Dimitrov; Stefanos Tsitsipas	11–13

== ATP Challenger and ITF Futures finals ==
=== Singles: 10 (8 titles, 2 runner-ups) ===
Legend ATP Challenger Tour (7–2) ITF Futures (1–0)	Finals by surface Hard (5–1) Clay (3–1) Grass (0–0) Carpet (0–0)

Result	W–L	Date	Tournament	Tier	Surface	Opponent	Score
Win	1–0	Jul 2014	Canada F5, Saskatoon	Futures	Hard	(South Africa) Fritz Wolmarans	7–6^{(7–4)}, 7–6^{(7–3)}
Win	1–0	May 2015	Bordeaux, France	Challenger	Clay	(Netherlands) Thiemo de Bakker	6–4, 1–6, 7–6^{(7–5)}
Win	2–0	Aug 2018	Aptos, USA	Challenger	Hard	(South Africa) Lloyd Harris	6–2, 6–3
Win	3–0	Oct 2018	Las Vegas, USA	Challenger	Hard	(Slovenia) Blaž Rola	6–4, 6–4
Loss	3–1	Sep 2019	Tiburon, USA	Challenger	Hard	(United States) Tommy Paul	5–7, 7–6^{(7–3)}, 4–6
Win	4–1	May 2021	Biella, Italy	Challenger	Clay	(France) Enzo Couacaud	6–3, 6–4
Loss	4–2	Oct 2021	Sibiu, Romania	Challenger	Clay	(Italy) Stefano Travaglia	6–7^{(4–7)}, 2–6
Win	5–2	Feb 2023	Manama, Bahrain	Challenger	Hard	(Jordan) Abedallah Shelbayh	6–1, 6–4
Win	6–2	Apr 2024	Sarasota, USA	Challenger	Clay (green)	(Belgium) Zizou Bergs	6–3, 1–6, 6–0
Win	7–2	Oct 2024	Sydney, Australia	Challenger	Hard	(Australia) Rinky Hijikata	6–1, 6–1

=== Doubles: 5 (3 titles, 2 runner-ups) ===
Legend ATP Challenger Tour (3–0) ITF Futures (0–2)	Finals by surface Hard (3–0) Clay (0–2) Grass (0–0) Carpet (0–0)

Result	W–L	Date	Tournament	Tier	Surface	Partner	Opponents	Score
Loss	0–1	Jun 2012	Slovenia F3, Litija	Futures	Clay	(Mexico) Daniel Garza	(Germany) Steven Moneke (Germany) Marc Sieber	2–6, 6–2, [8–10]
Loss	0–2	Jul 2012	Belgium F3, Knokke	Futures	Clay	(Netherlands Antilles) Alexander Blom	(Belgium) Joris De Loore (United Kingdom) Oliver Golding	7–5, 6–7^{(3–7)}, [7–10]
Win	1–0	Oct 2013	Melbourne, Australia	Challenger	Hard	(Australia) Benjamin Mitchell	(Australia) Andrew Whittington (Australia) Alex Bolt	6–3, 6–2
Win	2–0	Jul 2014	Winnetka, USA	Challenger	Hard	(United States) Denis Kudla	(United States) Raymond Sarmiento (United States) Evan King	6–2, 7–6^{(7–4)}
Win	3–0	Aug 2018	Aptos, USA	Challenger	Hard	(Australia) Matt Reid	(United Kingdom) Jonny O'Mara (United Kingdom) Joe Salisbury	6–2, 4–6 [10–8]

== Junior Grand Slam finals ==
=== Singles: 2 (2 runner-ups) ===
Result	Year	Tournament	Surface	Opponent	Score
Loss	2013	Australian Open	Hard	(Australia) Nick Kyrgios	6–7^{(4–7)}, 3–6
Loss	2013	US Open	Hard	(Croatia) Borna Ćorić	6–3, 3–6, 1–6

=== Doubles: 1 (1 title) ===
Result	Year	Tournament	Surface	Partner	Opponents	Score
Win	2013	Wimbledon	Grass	(Australia) Nick Kyrgios	(France) Enzo Couacaud (Italy) Stefano Napolitano	6–2, 6–3

== National representation ==
=== Davis Cup ===
Kokkinakis made his Davis Cup debut for Australia in February 2014 against France at the age of 17. He was selected to play in the fourth rubber, which was a dead rubber. He lost in straight sets to Julien Benneteau. He made his debut in a live rubber in 2015 with a comeback five-set win over Lukáš Rosol.

All Davis Cup matches: 8–8 (Singles: 8–8)
Round	Date	Opponents	Tie score	Venue	Surface	Match	Opponent	Rubber score
2014 Davis Cup World Group
1R	31 Jan–2 Feb 2014	France	0–5	La Roche-sur-Yon	Clay (i)	Singles 4	Julien Benneteau	4–6, 1–6
2015 Davis Cup World Group
1R	6–8 Mar 2015	Czech Republic	3–2	Ostrava	Hard (i)	Singles 1	Lukáš Rosol	4–6, 2–6, 7–5, 7–5, 6–3
QF	17–19 Jul 2015	Kazakhstan	3–2	Darwin	Grass	Singles 1	Mikhail Kukushkin	4–6, 3–6, 3–6
SF	18–20 Sep 2015	Great Britain	2–3	Glasgow	Hard (i)	Singles 1	Andy Murray	3–6, 0–6, 3–6
SF	18–20 Sep 2015	Great Britain	2–3	Glasgow	Hard (i)	Singles 5	Daniel Evans	7–5, 6–4
2022 Davis Cup qualifying round
QR	4–5 Mar 2022	Hungary	3–2	Sydney	Hard	Singles 2	Márton Fucsovics	6–7^{(4–7)}, 6–1, 3–6
QR	4–5 Mar 2022	Hungary	3–2	Sydney	Hard	Singles 5	Zsombor Piros	6–4, 6–4
2022 Davis Cup Finals
RR	18 Sep 2022	Germany	1–2	Hamburg	Hard (i)	Singles 2	Oscar Otte	7–6^{(8–6)}, 6–1
SF	25 Nov 2022	Croatia	3–2	Málaga	Hard (i)	Singles 1	Borna Ćorić	4–6, 3–6
F	27 Nov 2022	Canada	0–2	Málaga	Hard (i)	Singles 1	Denis Shapovalov	2–6, 4–6
2023 Davis Cup Finals
RR	13 Sep 2023	Great Britain	1–2	Manchester	Hard (i)	Singles 1	Jack Draper	7–6^{(8–6)}, 3–6, 6–7^{(4–7)}
RR	16 Sep 2023	Switzerland	3–0	Manchester	Hard (i)	Singles 1	Dominic Stricker	6–3, 7–5
2024 Davis Cup Finals
RR	10 Sep 2024	France	2–1	Valencia	Hard (i)	Singles 1	Arthur Fils	7–6^{(7–4)}, 7–6^{(7–3)}
RR	12 Sep 2024	Czech Republic	3–0	Valencia	Hard (i)	Singles 1	Jakub Menšík	6–2, 6–7^{(2–7)}, 6–3
QF	21 Nov 2024	United States	2–1	Málaga	Hard (i)	Singles 1	Ben Shelton	6–1, 4–6, 7–6^{(16–14)}
SF	23 Nov 2024	Italy	0–2	Málaga	Hard (i)	Singles 1	Matteo Berrettini	7–6^{(8–6)}, 3–6, 5–7

== Record against top-10 players ==
Kokkinakis' match record against players who have been ranked in the Top 10, with those who are active in boldface.
Only ATP Tour (incl. Grand Slams) main draw and Davis Cup matches are considered.

Opponent	Highest ranking	Matches	Won	Lost	Win %	Last match
**Number 1 ranked players**
(Switzerland) Roger Federer	1	1	1	0	100%	Won (3–6, 6–3, 7–6^{(7–4)}) at 2018 Miami 2R
(Spain) **Carlos Alcaraz**	1	1	0	1	0%	Lost (3–6, 3–6) at 2023 Indian Wells 2R
(Australia) Lleyton Hewitt	1	1	0	1	0%	Lost (3–6, 5–7) at 2014 Brisbane 1R
(Spain) Rafael Nadal	1	1	0	1	0%	Lost (2–6, 4–6, 2–6) at 2014 Australian Open 2R
(Serbia) **Novak Djokovic**	1	2	0	2	0%	Lost (1–6, 4–6, 2–6) at 2022 Wimbledon 2R
(United Kingdom) Andy Murray	1	2	0	2	0%	Lost (6–4, 7–6^{(7–4)}, 6–7^{(5–7)}, 3–6, 5–7) at 2023 Australian Open 2R
(Russia) **Daniil Medvedev**	1	3	0	3	0%	Lost (2–6, 7–6^{(8–6)}, 6–7^{(8–10)}, 4–6) at 2018 Australian Open 1R
(Italy) **Jannik Sinner**	1	4	0	4	0%	Lost (3–6, 0–6) at 2024 Indian Wells 2R
Number 2 ranked players
(Norway) **Casper Ruud**	2	1	0	1	0%	Lost (4–6, 6–7^{(3–7)}) at 2022 Geneva QF
(Germany) **Alexander Zverev**	2	2	0	2	0%	Lost (3–6, 4–6) at 2024 Los Cabos QF
Number 3 ranked players
(Croatia) **Marin Čilić**	3	1	1	0	100%	Won (6–2, 3–6, 7–6^{(12–10)}) at 2022 Adelaide 2 SF
(Canada) Milos Raonic	3	1	1	0	100%	Won (7–6^{(7–5)}, 7–6^{(10–8)}) at 2017 Queen's Club 1R
(Switzerland) **Stan Wawrinka**	3	1	1	0	100%	Won (3–6, 7–5, 6–3, 6–7^{(4–7)}, 6–3) at 2023 French Open 2R
(Greece) **Stefanos Tsitsipas**	3	3	1	2	33%	Lost (6–1, 6–4) at 2024 Laver Cup RR
(Bulgaria) **Grigor Dimitrov**	3	1	0	1	0%	Lost (3–6, 2–6, 6–4, 4–6) at 2024 Australian Open 2R
(Argentina) Juan Martín del Potro	3	1	0	1	0%	Lost (3–6, 6–3, 6–7^{(2–7)}, 4–6) at 2017 Wimbledon 1R
Number 4 ranked players
(Canada) **Félix Auger-Aliassime**	4	1	1	0	100%	Won (4–6, 5–7, 7–6^{(11–9)} 6–4, 6–4) at 2024 Wimbledon 1R
(Czech Republic) Tomáš Berdych	4	1	1	0	100%	Won (3–6, 7–6^{(7–5)}, 6–4) at 2017 Los Cabos SF
(United States) **Taylor Fritz**	4	3	1	2	33%	Lost (3–6, 2–6, 7–6^{(7–4)}. 7–5, 3–6) at 2024 French Open 3R
(United Kingdom) **Jack Draper**	4	4	1	3	25%	Lost (6–7(^{7–3}), 6–3, 3–6, 7–5, 6–3) at 2025 Australian Open 2R
(Japan) **Kei Nishikori**	4	1	0	1	0%	Lost (6–4, 1–6, 4–6, 4–6) at 2017 French Open 1R
Number 5 ranked players
(Russia) **Andrey Rublev**	5	1	1	0	100%	Won (6–4, 3–6, 6–3) at 2023 Adelaide 2 2R
(United States) **Ben Shelton**	5	1	1	0	100%	Won (6–1, 4–6, 7–6^{(16–14)}) at 2024 Davis Cup QF
(South Africa) Kevin Anderson	5	1	0	1	0%	Lost (6–4, 2–6, 3–6) at 2014 Canada 1R
(Australia) **Alex de Minaur**	5	1	0	1	0%	Lost (3–6, 4–6) at 2023 Atlanta 2R
(Italy) **Lorenzo Musetti**	5	1	0	1	0%	Lost (6–4, 5–7, 4–6) at 2023 Canada 2R
(France) Jo-Wilfried Tsonga	5	1	0	1	0%	Lost (6–7^{(6–8)}, 4–6) at 2019 Brisbane 1R
Number 6 ranked players
(France) **Gaël Monfils**	6	2	1	1	50%	Won (1–6, 6–3, 7–6^{(7–5)}) at 2023 Atlanta 1R
(France) Gilles Simon	6	1	0	1	0%	Lost (4–6, 2–6) at 2015 Queen's Club 2R
(Poland) **Hubert Hurkacz**	6	4	0	4	0%	Lost (4-6, 6-3, 7-6(^{8-6})) at 2024 Canada 2R
Number 7 ranked players
(Spain) Fernando Verdasco	7	2	1	1	50%	Won (6–3, 6–7^{(5–7)}, 6–2) at 2022 Los Cabos 1R
(France) Richard Gasquet	7	3	1	2	33%	Won (6–4, 6–2) at 2022 Miami 1R
Number 8 ranked players
(United States) John Isner	8	1	1	0	100%	Won (6–7^{(5–7)}, 7–6^{(7–5)}, 7–6^{(7–4)}) at 2022 Adelaide 2 2R
(Argentina) Diego Schwartzman	8	1	1	0	100%	Won (4–6, 7–6^{(7–3)}, 6–4) at 2022 Miami 2R
(Russia) Mikhail Youzhny	8	1	1	0	100%	Won (6–4, 7–5) at 2017 Rosmalen 1R
(Serbia) Janko Tipsarević	8	1	0	1	0%	Lost (7–6^{(7–5)}, 6–3, 1–6, 6–7^{(2–7)}, 3–6) at 2017 US Open 1R
(Russia) **Karen Khachanov**	8	2	0	2	0%	Lost (4–6, 1–6, 6–3, 6–7^{(5–7)}) at 2023 French Open 3R
Number 9 ranked players
(Italy) Fabio Fognini	9	4	4	0	100%	Won (6–2, 6–4) at 2023 Shanghai 1R
(Spain) Roberto Bautista Agut	9	1	0	1	0%	Lost (6–7^{(4–7)}, 6–3, 3–6) at 2023 Adelaide 2 SF
Number 10 ranked players
(United States) **Frances Tiafoe**	10	2	2	0	100%	Won (3–6, 7–5, 6–1) at 2022 Adelaide 1 2R
(Latvia) Ernests Gulbis	10	1	1	0	100%	Won (5–7, 6–0, 1–6, 7–6^{(7–2)}, 8–6) at 2015 Australian Open 1R
(Argentina) Juan Mónaco	10	1	1	0	100%	Won (6–2, 5–7, 7–6^{(7–5)}) at 2015 Indian Wells 3R
(Kazakhstan) **Alexander Bublik**	10	2	1	1	50%	Loss (4–6, 6–3, 6–7^{(12–10)}, 6–3, 6–4) at 2024 Wimbledon 1R
(France) Lucas Pouille	10	2	1	1	50%	Loss (6–2, 5–7, 2–5ret) at 2024 Wimbledon 2R
(Canada) **Denis Shapovalov**	10	1	0	1	0%	Lost (2–6, 4–6) at 2022 Davis Cup F
Total		60	22	38	37%	* Statistics correct as of 2 August 2024

== Wins over top 10 players ==
- Kokkinakis has a 3–13 record against players who were ranked in the top 10 at the time the match was played.

Season	2013	2014	2015	2016	2017	2018	2019	2020	2021	2022	2023	Total
Wins	0	0	0	0	1	1	0	0	0	0	1	3

#	Player	Rank	Event	Surface	Rd	Score	TKR
2017
1.	(Canada) Milos Raonic	6	Queen's Club, London, United Kingdom	Grass	1R	7–6^{(7–5)}, 7–6^{(10–8)}	698
2018
2.	(Switzerland) Roger Federer	1	Miami Open, United States	Hard	2R	3–6, 6–3, 7–6^{(7–4)}	175
2023
3.	Andrey Rublev	6	Adelaide International 2, Australia	Hard	2R	6–4, 3–6, 6–3	110

== See also ==
- Australia Davis Cup team
- List of Grand Slam men's doubles champions
