= Los Cabos Open =

Coordinates: 22°58′31″N 109°47′3″W

ATP Tour
- Event name: Mifel Tennis Open by Telcel Oppo
- Founded: 2016; 10 years ago
- Location: Los Cabos, San José del Cabo; Mexico
- Venue: Cabo Sports Complex
- Category: ATP Tour 250
- Surface: Hard (Solflex)
- Draw: 28S/32S/16D
- Prize money: US$889,890 (2025)
- Website: Official Website

Current champions (2026)
- Singles: (France) Arthur Géa
- Doubles: (United States) Ryan Seggerman (United States) Patrik Trhac

The Los Cabos Open, known as the Mifel Tennis Open by Telcel Oppo for sponsorship reasons, is a professional men's tennis tournament played on outdoor hardcourts. It is part of the ATP Tour 250 series on the ATP Tour. It is held annually in July in Los Cabos, Baja California Sur, Mexico.

== Past finals ==
=== Singles ===
Year	Champions	Runners-up	Score
2016	(Croatia) Ivo Karlović	(Spain) Feliciano López	7–6^{(7–5)}, 6–2
2017	(United States) Sam Querrey	(Australia) Thanasi Kokkinakis	6–3, 3–6, 6–2
2018	(Italy) Fabio Fognini	(Argentina) Juan Martín del Potro	6–4, 6–2
2019	(Argentina) Diego Schwartzman	(United States) Taylor Fritz	7–6^{(8–6)}, 6–3
2020	Not held due to COVID-19		
2021	(United Kingdom) Cameron Norrie	(United States) Brandon Nakashima	6–2, 6–2
2022	Daniil Medvedev	(United Kingdom) Cameron Norrie	7–5, 6–0
2023	(Greece) Stefanos Tsitsipas	(Australia) Alex de Minaur	6–3, 6–4
2024	(Australia) Jordan Thompson	(Norway) Casper Ruud	6–3, 7–6^{(7–4)}
2025	(Canada) Denis Shapovalov	(United States) Aleksandar Kovacevic	6–4, 6–2
2026	(France) Arthur Géa	(Canada) Denis Shapovalov	6–3, 6–4

=== Doubles ===
Year	Champions	Runners-up	Score
2016	(India) Purav Raja (India) Divij Sharan	(Israel) Jonathan Erlich (United Kingdom) Ken Skupski	7–6^{(7–4)}, 7–6^{(7–3)}
2017	(Colombia) Juan Sebastián Cabal (Philippines) Treat Huey	(Peru) Sergio Galdós (Venezuela) Roberto Maytín	6–2, 6–3
2018	(El Salvador) Marcelo Arévalo (Mexico) Miguel Ángel Reyes-Varela	(United States) Taylor Fritz (Australia) Thanasi Kokkinakis	6–4, 6–4
2019	(Monaco) Romain Arneodo (Monaco) Hugo Nys	(United Kingdom) Dominic Inglot (United States) Austin Krajicek	7–5, 5–7, [16–14]
2020	Not held due to COVID-19		
2021	(Mexico) Hans Hach Verdugo (United States) John Isner	(United States) Hunter Reese (Netherlands) Sem Verbeek	5–7, 6–2, [10–4]
2022	(United States) William Blumberg (Serbia) Miomir Kecmanović	(South Africa) Raven Klaasen (Brazil) Marcelo Melo	6–0, 6–1
2023	(Mexico) Santiago González (France) Édouard Roger-Vasselin	(Australia) Andrew Harris (Germany) Dominik Koepfer	6–4, 7–5
2024	(Australia) Max Purcell (Australia) Jordan Thompson	(Ecuador) Gonzalo Escobar (Kazakhstan) Aleksandr Nedovyesov	7–5, 7–6^{(7–2)}
2025	(United States) Robert Cash (United States) JJ Tracy	(Australia) Blake Bayldon (Australia) Tristan Schoolkate	7–6^{(7–4)}, 6–4
2026	(United States) Ryan Seggerman (United States) Patrik Trhac	(New Zealand) Finn Reynolds (New Zealand) James Watt	7–6^{(7–4)}, 6–7^{(5–7)}, [10–8]
