= 2015 Vietnam Open (tennis) =

- Date: 12–18 October
- Edition: 1st
- Surface: Hard
- Location: Ho Chi Minh City, Vietnam

Champions

Singles
- (India) Saketh Myneni

Doubles
- (France) Tristan Lamasine / (Germany) Nils Langer
Vietnam Open	· 2016 →

The 2015 Vietnam Open was a professional tennis tournament played on hard courts. It is the first edition of the tournament which is part of the 2015 ATP Challenger Tour. It takes place in Ho Chi Minh City, Vietnam between 12 and 18 October 2015.

== Singles main-draw entrants ==
=== Seeds ===
Country	Player	Rank^{1}	Seed
ESP	Marcel Granollers	81	1
AUS	James Duckworth	99	2
ESP	Adrián Menéndez Maceiras	135	3
IND	Saketh Myneni	168	4
ITA	Thomas Fabbiano	171	5
IND	Somdev Devvarman	178	6
BEL	Yannick Mertens	182	7
AUS	Jordan Thompson	185	8

- ^{1} Rankings are as of 11 October 2015.

=== Other entrants ===
The following players received wildcards into the singles main draw:

- (Vietnam) Phạm Minh Tuấn
- (India) Sumit Nagal
- (Vietnam) Nguyễn Hoàng Thiên
- (Vietnam) Lý Hoàng Nam

The following players received entry from the qualifying draw:

- (Germany) Daniel Masur
- (India) Vijay Sundar Prashanth
- (India) Jeevan Nedunchezhiyan
- (Italy) Flavio Cipolla

== Champions ==
=== Singles ===
- (India) Saketh Myneni def. (Australia) Jordan Thompson, 7–5, 6–3

=== Doubles ===
- (France) Tristan Lamasine / (Germany) Nils Langer def. (India) Saketh Myneni / (India) Sanam Singh, 1–6, 6–3, [10–8]
