= 2016 Vietnam Open (tennis) – Doubles =

Doubles
- 2016 Vietnam Open (tennis)

Final
- Champions: (Thailand) Sanchai Ratiwatana (Thailand) Sonchat Ratiwatana
- Runners-up: (India) Jeevan Nedunchezhiyan (India) Ramkumar Ramanathan
- Score: 7–5, 6–4

Events
Singles	Doubles
← 2015 ·	Vietnam Open	· 2017 →

Tristan Lamasine and Nils Langer were the defending champions but chose not to defend their title.

Sanchai and Sonchat Ratiwatana won the title after defeating Jeevan Nedunchezhiyan and Ramkumar Ramanathan 7–5, 6–4 in the final.

== Seeds ==
1. (Thailand) Sanchai Ratiwatana / (Thailand) Sonchat Ratiwatana (champions)
2. (Chinese Taipei) Hsieh Cheng-peng / (Chinese Taipei) Peng Hsien-yin (first round)
3. (India) Saketh Myneni / (India) Sanam Singh (withdrew)
4. (India) Jeevan Nedunchezhiyan / (India) Ramkumar Ramanathan (final)

== Draw ==
=== Key ===
- Q = Qualifier
- WC = Wild card
- LL = Lucky loser
- Alt = Alternate
- SE = Special exempt
- PR = Protected ranking
- ITF = ITF entry
- JE = Junior exempt
- w/o = Walkover
- r = Retired
- d = Defaulted
- SR = Special ranking

First round
1	(Thailand) Sa Ratiwatana (Thailand) So Ratiwatana	7^{7}	6
(United States) S Kozlov (United States) M Krueger	6^{2}	1
WC	(Vietnam) NH Lý (Vietnam) TH Nguyễn	6	6
(Japan) T Daniel (Japan) A Santillan	4	3
LL	(Serbia) N Čačić (Serbia) Nebojša Perić	2	2
(Italy) A Arnaboldi (Germany) P Gojowczyk	6	6
WC	(Vietnam) Lê Công Tiễn (Vietnam) Nguyễn Đắc Tiến	0	2
(India) VS Prashanth (Indonesia) C Rungkat	6	6
Q	(Japan) Hiroyasu Ehara (Japan) Masato Shiga	3	6^{6}
LL	(France) Laurent Rochette (France) Maxime Tabatruong	6	7^{8}
(India) S Balaji (Japan) T Ito	6	3	[4]
4	(India) J Nedunchezhiyan (India) R Ramanathan	0	6	[10]
(Japan) K Takeuchi (Japan) Y Uchiyama	6	6
WC	(Australia) Stefan Skadarka (Chinese Taipei) J Wang	3	3
(Australia) J Thompson (Australia) A Whittington	6	4	[10]
2	(Chinese Taipei) C-p Hsieh (Chinese Taipei) H-y Peng	4	6	[3]

Quarterfinals
1	(Thailand) Sa Ratiwatana (Thailand) So Ratiwatana	6	6
WC	(Vietnam) NH Lý (Vietnam) TH Nguyễn	4	3
(Italy) A Arnaboldi (Germany) P Gojowczyk	1	3
(India) VS Prashanth (Indonesia) C Rungkat	6	6
LL	(France) L Rochette (France) M Tabatruong	3	4
4	(India) J Nedunchezhiyan (India) R Ramanathan	6	6
(Japan) K Takeuchi (Japan) Y Uchiyama	6	4	[13]
(Australia) J Thompson (Australia) A Whittington	3	6	[11]

Semifinals
1	(Thailand) Sa Ratiwatana (Thailand) So Ratiwatana	6	6
(India) VS Prashanth (Indonesia) C Rungkat	2	4
4	(India) J Nedunchezhiyan (India) R Ramanathan	7^{11}	6
(Japan) K Takeuchi (Japan) Y Uchiyama	6^{9}	4

Final
1	(Thailand) Sa Ratiwatana (Thailand) So Ratiwatana	7	6
4	(India) J Nedunchezhiyan (India) R Ramanathan	5	4
