= 2023 Los Cabos Open – Doubles =

Doubles
- 2023 Los Cabos Open

Final
- Champions: (Mexico) Santiago González (France) Édouard Roger-Vasselin
- Runners-up: (Australia) Andrew Harris (Germany) Dominik Koepfer
- Score: 6–4, 7–5

Events
Singles	Doubles
← 2022 ·	Los Cabos Open	· 2024 →

Santiago González and Édouard Roger-Vasselin defeated Andrew Harris and Dominik Koepfer in the final, 6–4, 7–5 to win the doubles tennis title at the 2023 Los Cabos Open.

William Blumberg and Miomir Kecmanović were the reigning champions, but Kecmanović chose not to compete this year. Blumberg partnered Rinky Hijikata, but lost in the quarterfinals to Diego Hidalgo and Cristian Rodríguez.

== Seeds ==
1. (Mexico) Santiago González / (France) Édouard Roger-Vasselin (champions)
2. (Brazil) Marcelo Melo / (Australia) John Peers (first round)
3. (United States) Nathaniel Lammons / (United States) Jackson Withrow (quarterfinals)
4. (United States) William Blumberg / (Australia) Rinky Hijikata (quarterfinals)

== Draw ==
=== Key ===
- Q = Qualifier
- WC = Wild card
- LL = Lucky loser
- Alt = Alternate
- SE = Special exempt
- PR = Protected ranking
- ITF = ITF entry
- JE = Junior exempt
- w/o = Walkover
- r = Retired
- d = Defaulted
- SR = Special ranking

=== Draw ===
First round
1	(Mexico) S González (France) É Roger-Vasselin	6	6
(India) Y Bhambri (Japan) B McLachlan	3	3
(Mexico) H Hach Verdugo (Mexico) MÁ Reyes-Varela	1	3
(United Kingdom) J Cash (United States) R Galloway	6	6
3	(United States) N Lammons (United States) J Withrow	6	6
WC	(Mexico) LC Álvarez (Mexico) L Lemaitre	3	2
(Finland) P Niklas-Salminen (Netherlands) B Stevens	6	6^{9}	[7]
(Colombia) N Barrientos (Sweden) A Göransson	4	7^{11}	[10]
(Ecuador) D Hidalgo (Colombia) C Rodríguez	6^{4}	6	[10]
(India) S Balaji (India) J Nedunchezhiyan	7^{7}	4	[0]
(United States) E King (United States) R Stalder	3	6^{1}
4	(United States) W Blumberg (Australia) R Hijikata	6	7^{7}
(Venezuela) LD Martínez (India) S Myneni	6	2	[10]
WC	(Mexico) E Escobedo (Mexico) R Pacheco Méndez	3	6	[5]
(Australia) A Harris (Germany) D Koepfer	4	6	[10]
2	(Brazil) M Melo (Australia) J Peers	6	4	[8]

Quarterfinals
1	(Mexico) S González (France) É Roger-Vasselin	6	6
(United Kingdom) J Cash (United States) R Galloway	4	4
3	(United States) N Lammons (United States) J Withrow	6^{5}	6	[6]
(Colombia) N Barrientos (Sweden) A Göransson	7^{7}	4	[10]
(Ecuador) D Hidalgo (Colombia) C Rodríguez	7^{7}	4	[10]
4	(United States) W Blumberg (Australia) R Hijikata	6^{5}	6	[7]
(Venezuela) LD Martínez (India) S Myneni	6	3	[5]
(Australia) A Harris (Germany) D Koepfer	3	6	[10]

Semifinals
1	(Mexico) S González (France) É Roger-Vasselin	6^{2}	6	[10]
(Colombia) N Barrientos (Sweden) A Göransson	7^{7}	4	[8]
(Ecuador) D Hidalgo (Colombia) C Rodríguez	6^{5}	7^{8}	[4]
(Australia) A Harris (Germany) D Koepfer	7^{7}	6^{6}	[10]

Final
1	(Mexico) S González (France) É Roger-Vasselin	6	7
(Australia) A Harris (Germany) D Koepfer	4	5
