= 2015 Vietnam Open (tennis) – Singles =

Singles
- 2015 Vietnam Open (tennis)

Final
- Champion: (India) Saketh Myneni
- Runner-up: (Australia) Jordan Thompson
- Score: 7–5, 6–3

Events
Singles	Doubles
Vietnam Open	· 2016 →

This was the first edition of the event, the title was won by Saketh Myneni who beat Jordan Thompson in the final 7–5, 6–3.

== Seeds ==
1. (Spain) Marcel Granollers (quarterfinals)
2. (Australia) James Duckworth (quarterfinals)
3. (Spain) Adrián Menéndez Maceiras (second round)
4. (India) Saketh Myneni (champion)
5. (Italy) Thomas Fabbiano (semifinals)
6. (India) Somdev Devvarman (first round)
7. (Belgium) Yannick Mertens (first round)
8. (Australia) Jordan Thompson (final)

== Draw ==
=== Key ===
- Q = Qualifier
- WC = Wild card
- LL = Lucky loser
- Alt = Alternate
- SE = Special exempt
- PR = Protected ranking
- ITF = ITF entry
- JE = Junior exempt
- w/o = Walkover
- r = Retired
- d = Defaulted
- SR = Special ranking

=== Finals ===
Semifinals
5	(Italy) Thomas Fabbiano	7	4	2
4	(India) Saketh Myneni	5	6	6
Q	(Italy) Flavio Cipolla	1	5
8	(Australia) Jordan Thompson	6	7

Final
4	(India) Saketh Myneni	7	6
8	(Australia) Jordan Thompson	5	3

=== Top half ===
First round
1	(Spain) M Granollers	6	6
Q	(Germany) D Masur	3	3
(Chinese Taipei) T-h Yang	6	6
WC	(Vietnam) TM Phạm	2	2
(Croatia) M Pecotić	6	7
Q	(India) VS Prashanth	4	5
(South Korea) D-h Lee	4	4
5	(Italy) T Fabbiano	6	6
4	(India) S Myneni	6	7^{7}
(Spain) G Granollers	4	6^{3}
(Australia) Gavin van Peperzeel	2	4
(Japan) Y Uchiyama	6	6
Q	(India) J Nedunchezhiyan	2	2
(Japan) Hiroyasu Ehara	6	6
(France) T Lamasine	6	7^{7}
7	(Belgium) Y Mertens	4	6^{2}

Second round
1	(Spain) M Granollers	7	1	6
(Chinese Taipei) T-h Yang	5	6	2
(Croatia) M Pecotić	3	4
5	(Italy) T Fabbiano	6	6
4	(India) S Myneni	6	4	6
(Japan) Y Uchiyama	4	6	1
(Japan) H Ehara	0	7	2
(France) T Lamasine	6	5	6

Quarterfinals
1	(Spain) M Granollers	3	4
5	(Italy) T Fabbiano	6	6
4	(India) S Myneni	6	2	6
(France) T Lamasine	1	6	3

Semifinals
5	(Italy) T Fabbiano	7	4	2
4	(India) S Myneni	5	6	6

=== Bottom half ===
First round
6	(India) S Devvarman	6^{4}	6	2
(Australia) L Saville	7^{7}	3	6
(Chinese Taipei) J Wang	3^{r}
Q	(Italy) F Cipolla	3
(Germany) N Langer	1	7^{7}	3
(United States) D Nguyen	6	6^{1}	6
WC	(India) S Nagal	0	7^{7}	1
3	(Spain) A Menéndez Maceiras	6	6^{2}	6
8	(Australia) J Thompson	7^{7}	6
(Italy) A Bega	6^{4}	2
WC	(Vietnam) TH Nguyễn	3	3
(Chinese Taipei) L-c Huang	6	6
(Belgium) G Gigounon	6	3	4
(India) S Singh	1	6	6
WC	(Vietnam) HN Lý	2	2
2	(Australia) J Duckworth	6	6

Second round
(Australia) L Saville	5	3
Q	(Italy) F Cipolla	7	6
(United States) D Nguyen	6	6^{5}	6
3	(Spain) A Menéndez Maceiras	3	7^{7}	1
8	(Australia) J Thompson	6	6
(Chinese Taipei) L-c Huang	2	3
(India) S Singh	1	2
2	(Australia) J Duckworth	6	6

Quarterfinals
Q	(Italy) F Cipolla	7^{7}	7
(United States) D Nguyen	6^{4}	5
8	(Australia) J Thompson	4	7^{7}	3
2	(Australia) J Duckworth	6	6^{5}	1^{r}

Semifinals
Q	(Italy) F Cipolla	1	5
8	(Australia) J Thompson	6	7
