= 2015 Vietnam Open (tennis) – Doubles =

Doubles
- 2015 Vietnam Open (tennis)

Final
- Champion: (France) Tristan Lamasine (Germany) Nils Langer
- Runner-up: (India) Saketh Myneni (India) Sanam Singh
- Score: 1–6, 6–3, [10–8]

Events
Singles	Doubles
Vietnam Open	· 2016 →

This was the first edition of the event, and was won by Tristan Lamasine and Nils Langer who beat Saketh Myneni and Sanam Singh in the final 1–6, 6–3, [10–8].

== Seeds ==
1. (Thailand) Sanchai Ratiwatana / (Thailand) Sonchat Ratiwatana (semifinals)
2. (Chinese Taipei) Lee Hsin-han / (Chinese Taipei) Peng Hsien-yin (quarterfinals, withdrew)
3. (India) Saketh Myneni / (India) Sanam Singh (final)
4. (Chinese Taipei) Hsieh Cheng-peng / (Chinese Taipei) Yang Tsung-hua (quarterfinals, withdrew)

== Draw ==
=== Key ===
- Q = Qualifier
- WC = Wild card
- LL = Lucky loser
- Alt = Alternate
- SE = Special exempt
- PR = Protected ranking
- ITF = ITF entry
- JE = Junior exempt
- w/o = Walkover
- r = Retired
- d = Defaulted
- SR = Special ranking

=== Main draw ===
First round
1	(Thailand) Sa Ratiwatana (Thailand) So Ratiwatana	3	6	[10]
(Spain) M Granollers (Spain) A Menéndez-Maceiras	6	1	[5]
(Australia) J Duckworth (United States) D Nguyen	6	6
WC	(United States) Minh Le (Vietnam) Artem Vu	1	2
3	(India) S Myneni (India) S Singh	6	6
WC	(Vietnam) TH Nguyễn (Vietnam) TM Phạm	0	2
(Australia) L Saville (Australia) J Thompson	2	1
Q	(Italy) T Fabbiano (Italy) A Bega	6	6
WC	(Vietnam) HN Lý (India) S Nagal	3	7	[6]
(Japan) T Matsui (Japan) Y Uchiyama	6	5	[10]
(Italy) F Cipolla (France) S Robert	6^{6}	4
4	(Chinese Taipei) C-p Hsieh (Chinese Taipei) T-h Yang	7^{8}	6
(France) T Lamasine (Germany) N Langer	6	6
(India) S Devvarman (India) J Nedunchezhiyan	3	4
(Belgium) G Gigounon (Belgium) Y Mertens	2	6^{4}
2	(Chinese Taipei) H-h Lee (Chinese Taipei) H-y Peng	6	7^{7}

Quarter-finals
1	(Thailand) Sa Ratiwatana (Thailand) So Ratiwatana	w/o
(Australia) J Duckworth (United States) D Nguyen
3	(India) S Myneni (India) S Singh	5	6	[10]
Q	(Italy) T Fabbiano (Italy) A Bega	7	4	[5]
(Japan) T Matsui (Japan) Y Uchiyama	w/o
4	(Chinese Taipei) C-p Hsieh (Chinese Taipei) T-h Yang
(France) T Lamasine (Germany) N Langer	6	7
2	(Chinese Taipei) H-h Lee (Chinese Taipei) H-y Peng	2	5

Semi-finals
1	(Thailand) Sa Ratiwatana (Thailand) So Ratiwatana	7^{7}	4	[6]
3	(India) S Myneni (India) S Singh	6^{5}	6	[10]
(Japan) T Matsui (Japan) Y Uchiyama	4	4
(France) T Lamasine (Germany) N Langer	6	6

Final
3	(India) S Myneni (India) S Singh	6	3	[8]
(France) T Lamasine (Germany) N Langer	1	6	[10]
