= 2017 Vietnam Open (tennis) – Singles =

Singles
- 2017 Vietnam Open (tennis)

Final
- Champion: (Russia) Mikhail Youzhny
- Runner-up: (Australia) John Millman
- Score: 6–4, 6–4

Events
Singles	Doubles
← 2016 ·	Vietnam Open	· 2018 →

Jordan Thompson was the defending champion but chose not to defend his title.

Mikhail Youzhny won the title after defeating John Millman 6–4, 6–4 in the final.

== Seeds ==
1. (United States) Taylor Fritz (quarterfinals)
2. (Russia) Mikhail Youzhny (champion)
3. (Canada) Peter Polansky (quarterfinals)
4. (India) Yuki Bhambri (quarterfinals)
5. (Japan) Go Soeda (semifinals)
6. (Australia) Akira Santillan(semifinals)
7. (Kazakhstan) Dmitry Popko (first round)
8. (Australia) John Millman (final)

== Draw ==
=== Key ===
- Q = Qualifier
- WC = Wild card
- LL = Lucky loser
- Alt = Alternate
- SE = Special exempt
- PR = Protected ranking
- ITF = ITF entry
- JE = Junior exempt
- w/o = Walkover
- r = Retired
- d = Defaulted
- SR = Special ranking

=== Finals ===
Semifinals
5	(Japan) Go Soeda	6^{5}	6	5
8	(Australia) John Millman	7^{7}	3	7
6	(Australia) Akira Santillan	7^{7}	4	3
2	(Russia) Mikhail Youzhny	6^{5}	6	6

Final
8	(Australia) John Millman	4	4
2	(Russia) Mikhail Youzhny	6	6

=== Top half ===
First round
1/WC	(United States) T Fritz	6	6
(India) VS Prashanth	2	4
(Australia) M Polmans	4	2
(India) P Gunneswaran	6	6
Q	(Switzerland) J Paul	5	6	3
(Egypt) M Safwat	7	2	6
(Vietnam) NH Lý	4	1
5	(Japan) G Soeda	6	6
4	(India) Y Bhambri	6	6
(New Zealand) J Statham	1	4
(Chinese Taipei) T Chen	6	2	6
Q	(Ukraine) Vadym Ursu	1	6	2
(France) A Escoffier	3	6	7
Q	(Switzerland) Raphael Baltensperger	6	1	5
(Australia) M Purcell	1	3
8	(Australia) J Millman	6	6

Second round
1/WC	(United States) T Fritz	6	6
(India) P Gunneswaran	3	3
(Egypt) M Safwat	7^{7}	2	6^{5}
5	(Japan) G Soeda	6^{4}	6	7^{7}
4	(India) Y Bhambri	6	6
(Chinese Taipei) T Chen	3	1
(France) A Escoffier	1	4
8	(Australia) J Millman	6	6

Quarterfinals
1/WC	(United States) T Fritz	3	5
5	(Japan) G Soeda	6	7
4	(India) Y Bhambri	6	3	6^{2}
8	(Australia) J Millman	3	6	7^{7}

Semifinals
5	(Japan) G Soeda	6^{5}	6	5
8	(Australia) J Millman	7^{7}	3	7

=== Bottom half ===
First round
6	(Australia) A Santillan	6	6
PR	(India) S Myneni	4	2
LL	(Kazakhstan) T Khabibulin	4	2
(Japan) Yo Watanuki	6	6
WC	(Vietnam) TM Phạm	5	3
(France) S Robert	7	6
(Italy) A Bega	4	6	5
3	(Canada) P Polansky	6	4	7
7	(Kazakhstan) D Popko	6^{6}	2
(France) H Grenier	7^{8}	6
(Chinese Taipei) J Jung	6	6
Q	(Bulgaria) V Mladenov	3	3
WC	(Australia) M Matosevic	4	6	6
WC	(Vietnam) GL Trịnh	6	0	2
(India) S Nagal	1	7^{7}	4
2	(Russia) M Youzhny	6	6^{5}	6

Second round
6	(Australia) A Santillan	6	6
(Japan) Yo Watanuki	3	0
(France) S Robert	5	7^{10}	4
3	(Canada) P Polansky	7	6^{8}	6
(France) H Grenier	6^{5}	3
(Chinese Taipei) J Jung	7^{7}	6
WC	(Australia) M Matosevic	1	1
2	(Russia) M Youzhny	6	6

Quarterfinals
6	(Australia) A Santillan	6	3	6
3	(Canada) P Polansky	3	6	4
(Chinese Taipei) J Jung	3	2
2	(Russia) M Youzhny	6	6

Semifinals
6	(Australia) A Santillan	7^{7}	4	3
2	(Russia) M Youzhny	6^{5}	6	6
