= 2017 Vietnam Open (tennis) =

- Date: 23–29 October
- Edition: 3rd
- Surface: Hard
- Location: Ho Chi Minh City, Vietnam

Champions

Singles
- (Russia) Mikhail Youzhny

Doubles
- (India) Saketh Myneni / (India) Vijay Sundar Prashanth
← 2016 ·	Vietnam Open	· 2018 →

The 2017 Vietnam Open was a professional tennis tournament played on hard courts. It is the third edition of the tournament which is part of the 2017 ATP Challenger Tour. It takes place in Ho Chi Minh City, Vietnam between 23 and 29 October 2017.

== Singles main-draw entrants ==
=== Seeds ===
Country	Player	Rank	Seed
USA	Taylor Fritz	99	1
RUS	Mikhail Youzhny	126	2
CAN	Peter Polansky	130	3
IND	Yuki Bhambri	146	4
JPN	Go Soeda	159	5
AUS	Akira Santillan	162	6
KAZ	Dmitry Popko	189	7
AUS	John Millman	194	8

=== Other entrants ===
The following players received wildcards into the singles main draw:

- (United States) Taylor Fritz
- (Australia) Marinko Matosevic
- (Vietnam) Phạm Minh Tuấn
- (Vietnam) Trịnh Linh Giang

The following player received entry into the singles main draw using a protected ranking:

- (India) Saketh Myneni

The following players received entry from the qualifying draw:

- (Switzerland) Raphael Baltensperger
- (Bulgaria) Vasko Mladenov
- (Switzerland) Jakub Paul
- (Ukraine) Vadym Ursu

The following player received entry as a lucky loser:

- (Kazakhstan) Timur Khabibulin

== Champions ==
=== Singles ===
- (Russia) Mikhail Youzhny def. (Australia) John Millman 6–4, 6–4.

=== Doubles ===
- (India) Saketh Myneni / (India) Vijay Sundar Prashanth def. (Japan) Ben McLachlan / (Japan) Go Soeda 7–6^{(7–3)}, 7–6^{(7–5)}.
