= 2018 Shimadzu All Japan Indoor Tennis Championships =

- Date: 19 – 25 February
- Edition: 22nd
- Draw: 32S / 16D
- Surface: carpet indoor
- Location: Kyoto, Japan

Champions

Singles
- (Australia) John Millman

Doubles
- (Australia) Luke Saville / (Australia) Jordan Thompson
- Shimadzu All Japan Indoor Tennis Championships

The 2018 Shimadzu All Japan Indoor Tennis Championships was a professional tennis tournament played on carpet indoor. It was the 22nd edition of the tournament which was part of the 2018 ATP Challenger Tour. It took place in Kyoto, Japan between 19 and 25 February 2018.

== Singles main draw entrants ==
=== Seeds ===
Country	Player	Rank^{1}	Seed
AUS	John Millman	103	1
AUS	Jordan Thompson	107	2
JPN	Go Soeda	161	3
FRA	Stéphane Robert	162	4
JPN	Tatsuma Ito	181	5
KOR	Kwon Soon-woo	184	6
POL	Hubert Hurkacz	219	7
JPN	Yasutaka Uchiyama	222	8

- ^{1} Rankings are as of 12 February 2018.

=== Other entrants ===
The following players received wildcards into the singles main draw:

- (Japan) Sora Fukuda
- (Japan) Shintaro Imai
- (Japan) Yuta Shimizu
- (Japan) Yosuke Watanuki

The following player received entry into the singles main draw using a protected ranking:

- (Poland) Michał Przysiężny

The following players received entry from the qualifying draw:

- (Australia) Blake Ellis
- (Zimbabwe) Takanyi Garanganga
- (Japan) Yuya Kibi
- (China) Li Zhe

== Champions ==
=== Singles ===
- (Australia) John Millman def. (Australia) Jordan Thompson 7–5, 6–1.

=== Doubles ===
- (Australia) Luke Saville / (Australia) Jordan Thompson def. (Japan) Go Soeda / (Japan) Yasutaka Uchiyama 6–3, 5–7, [10–6].
