= 2024 Los Cabos Open =

- Date: 19–24 February
- Edition: 8th
- Draw: 28S / 16D
- Prize money: $915,245
- Surface: Hard
- Location: Los Cabos, Mexico
- Venue: Cabo Sports Complex

Champions

Singles
- (Australia) Jordan Thompson

Doubles
- (Australia) Max Purcell / (Australia) Jordan Thompson
- Los Cabos Open

The 2024 Los Cabos Open (known as the Mifel Tennis Open by Telcel Oppo for sponsorship reasons) was an ATP tennis tournament played on outdoor hardcourts. It was the 8th edition of the tournament, and part of the ATP Tour 250 series of the 2024 ATP Tour. It took place in Los Cabos, Mexico from 19 through 24 February 2024 due to schedule change from July to February.

== Finals ==
=== Singles ===
- (Australia) Jordan Thompson def. (Norway) Casper Ruud 6–3, 7–6^{(7–4)}

=== Doubles ===
- (Australia) Max Purcell / (Australia) Jordan Thompson def. (Ecuador) Gonzalo Escobar / (Kazakhstan) Aleksandr Nedovyesov 7–5, 7–6^{(7–2)}

== Singles main-draw entrants ==
=== Seeds ===
Country	Player	Rank^{1}	Seed
GER	Alexander Zverev	6	1
GRE	Stefanos Tsitsipas	10	2
AUS	Alex de Minaur	11	3
NOR	Casper Ruud	12	4
	Roman Safiullin	39	5
SRB	Miomir Kecmanović	40	6
AUS	Max Purcell	41	7
AUS	Jordan Thompson	42	8

- Rankings are as of 12 February 2024.

=== Other entrants ===
The following players received wildcards into the main draw:

- (Mexico) Ernesto Escobedo
- (Mexico) Rodrigo Pacheco Méndez
- (Argentina) Diego Schwartzman

The following players received entry from the qualifying draw:

- (Italy) Flavio Cobolli
- (United States) Brandon Holt
- (United States) Aleksandar Kovacevic
- (United States) Emilio Nava

=== Withdrawals ===
- (United States) Christopher Eubanks → replaced by (United States) Alex Michelsen
- (United States) Mackenzie McDonald → replaced by (Australia) Aleksandar Vukic
- (Denmark) Holger Rune → replaced by (Portugal) Nuno Borges
- (United States) J.J. Wolf → replaced by (United States) Marcos Giron

== Doubles main-draw entrants ==
=== Seeds ===
Country	Player	Country	Player	Rank^{1}	Seed
MEX	Santiago González	GBR	Neal Skupski	17	1
MON	Hugo Nys	POL	Jan Zieliński	51	2
FIN	Harri Heliövaara	AUS	John Peers	74	3
AUS	Max Purcell	AUS	Jordan Thompson	97	4

- ^{1} Rankings are as of 12 February 2024.

=== Other entrants ===
The following pairs received wildcards into the doubles main draw:

- (Mexico) Hans Hach Verdugo / (Venezuela) Luis David Martínez
- (Mexico) Rodrigo Pacheco Méndez / (Argentina) Diego Schwartzman
