= 2017 Vietnam Open (tennis) – Doubles =

Doubles
- 2017 Vietnam Open (tennis)

Final
- Champions: (India) Saketh Myneni (India) Vijay Sundar Prashanth
- Runners-up: (Japan) Ben McLachlan (Japan) Go Soeda
- Score: 7–6^{(7–3)}, 7–6^{(7–5)}

Events
Singles	Doubles
← 2016 ·	Vietnam Open	· 2018 →

Sanchai and Sonchat Ratiwatana were the defending champions but lost in the quarterfinals to Ben McLachlan and Go Soeda.

Saketh Myneni and Vijay Sundar Prashanth won the title after defeating McLachlan and Soeda 7–6^{(7–3)}, 7–6^{(7–5)} in the final.

== Seeds ==
1. (United States) James Cerretani / (Australia) Marc Polmans (quarterfinals)
2. (Thailand) Sanchai Ratiwatana / (Thailand) Sonchat Ratiwatana (quarterfinals)
3. (Philippines) Ruben Gonzales / (United States) Hunter Reese (semifinals)
4. (Canada) Peter Polansky / (Australia) Akira Santillan (first round)

== Draw ==
=== Key ===
- Q = Qualifier
- WC = Wild card
- LL = Lucky loser
- Alt = Alternate
- SE = Special exempt
- PR = Protected ranking
- ITF = ITF entry
- JE = Junior exempt
- w/o = Walkover
- r = Retired
- d = Defaulted
- SR = Special ranking

First round
1	(United States) J Cerretani (Australia) M Polmans	6	6
(Kazakhstan) T Khabibulin (New Zealand) J Statham	2	4
(Vietnam) NH Lý (India) S Nagal	2	6	[7]
(Chinese Taipei) T Chen (Australia) M Purcell	6	2	[10]
4	(Canada) P Polansky (Australia) A Santillan	7^{7}	2	[8]
(India) S Myneni (India) VS Prashanth	6^{4}	6	[10]
(Italy) A Bega (France) S Robert	7	2	[10]
(France) A Escoffier (France) H Grenier	5	6	[6]
(Bulgaria) V Mladenov (Ukraine) Vadym Ursu	6	6
WC	(Kazakhstan) A Kedryuk (Vietnam) Artem Vu	1	1
WC	(Vietnam) TM Phạm (Vietnam) GL Trịnh	1	1
3	(Philippines) R Gonzales (United States) H Reese	6	6
(Japan) B McLachlan (Japan) G Soeda	7	1
(Kazakhstan) D Popko (Egypt) M Safwat	5	0^{r}
WC	(Thailand) Congsup Congcar (Australia) Wolfgang Oswald	1	0
2	(Thailand) Sa Ratiwatana (Thailand) So Ratiwatana	6	6

Quarterfinals
1	(United States) J Cerretani (Australia) M Polmans	3	3
(Chinese Taipei) T Chen (Australia) M Purcell	6	6
(India) S Myneni (India) VS Prashanth	7^{8}	1	[10]
(Italy) A Bega (France) S Robert	6^{6}	6	[4]
(Bulgaria) V Mladenov (Ukraine) V Ursu	3	1
3	(Philippines) R Gonzales (United States) H Reese	6	6
(Japan) B McLachlan (Japan) G Soeda	2	7^{7}	[10]
2	(Thailand) Sa Ratiwatana (Thailand) So Ratiwatana	6	6^{5}	[6]

Semifinals
(Chinese Taipei) T Chen (Australia) M Purcell	6^{3}	6	[7]
(India) S Myneni (India) VS Prashanth	7^{7}	3	[10]
3	(Philippines) R Gonzales (United States) H Reese	4	7^{7}	[5]
(Japan) B McLachlan (Japan) G Soeda	6	6^{1}	[10]

Final
(India) S Myneni (India) VS Prashanth	7^{7}	7^{7}
(Japan) B McLachlan (Japan) G Soeda	6^{3}	6^{5}
