= 2023 Los Cabos Open =

- Date: 31 July–5 August
- Edition: 7th
- Draw: 28S / 16D
- Prize money: $852,480
- Surface: Hard
- Location: Los Cabos, Mexico
- Venue: Cabo Sports Complex

Champions

Singles
- (Greece) Stefanos Tsitsipas

Doubles
- (Mexico) Santiago González / (France) Édouard Roger-Vasselin
- Los Cabos Open

The 2023 Los Cabos Open (known as the Mifel Tennis Open by Telcel Oppo for sponsorship reasons) was an ATP tennis tournament played on outdoor hardcourts. It was the 7th edition of the tournament, and part of the ATP Tour 250 series of the 2023 ATP Tour. It took place in Los Cabos, Mexico from 31 July through 5 August 2023.

== Champions ==
=== Singles ===
- (Greece) Stefanos Tsitsipas def. (Australia) Alex de Minaur, 6–3, 6–4

=== Doubles ===
- (Mexico) Santiago González / (France) Édouard Roger-Vasselin def. (Australia) Andrew Harris / (Germany) Dominik Koepfer, 6–4, 7–5

== Points and prize money ==
=== Point distribution ===
Event	W	F	SF	QF	Round of 16	Round of 32	Q	Q2	Q1
Singles	250	150	90	45	20	0	12	6	0
Doubles	250	150	90	45	0	—N/a	—N/a	—N/a	—N/a

=== Prize money ===
Event	W	F	SF	QF	Round of 16	Round of 32	Q2	Q1
Singles	$129,660	$75,630	$44,465	$25,765	$14,960	$9,145	$4,570	$2,495
Doubles*	$45,050	$24,100	$14,120	$7,900	$4,655	—N/a	—N/a	—N/a

_{*per team}

== Singles main-draw entrants ==
=== Seeds ===
Country	Player	Rank^{1}	Seed
GRE	Stefanos Tsitsipas	5	1
GBR	Cameron Norrie	13	2
USA	Tommy Paul	14	3
CRO	Borna Ćorić	15	4
AUS	Alex de Minaur	17	5
CHI	Nicolás Jarry	29	6
GER	Dominik Koepfer	88	7
	Ilya Ivashka	91	8

- Rankings are as of 24 July 2023.

=== Other entrants ===
The following players received wildcards into the main draw:

- (Mexico) Ernesto Escobedo
- (Chile) Nicolás Jarry
- (Mexico) Rodrigo Pacheco Méndez

The following players received entry from the qualifying draw:

- (United States) Omni Kumar
- (Chile) Gonzalo Lama
- (Tunisia) Skander Mansouri
- (Kazakhstan) Beibit Zhukayev

The following player received entry as a lucky loser:

- (Chinese Taipei) Jason Jung

=== Withdrawals ===
- (Portugal) Nuno Borges → replaced by (Canada) Gabriel Diallo
- Karen Khachanov → replaced by (Chinese Taipei) Jason Jung

== Doubles main-draw entrants ==
=== Seeds ===
Country	Player	Country	Player	Rank^{1}	Seed
MEX	Santiago González	FRA	Édouard Roger-Vasselin	24	1
BRA	Marcelo Melo	AUS	John Peers	65	2
USA	Nathaniel Lammons	USA	Jackson Withrow	65	3
USA	William Blumberg	AUS	Rinky Hijikata	127	4

- ^{1} Rankings are as of 24 July 2023.

=== Other entrants ===
The following pairs received wildcards into the doubles main draw:

- (Mexico) Luis Carlos Álvarez / (Mexico) Luca Lemaitre
- (Mexico) Ernesto Escobedo / (Mexico) Rodrigo Pacheco Méndez
