= 2018 Shimadzu All Japan Indoor Tennis Championships – Doubles =

Doubles
- 2018 Shimadzu All Japan Indoor Tennis Championships

Final
- Champions: (Australia) Luke Saville (Australia) Jordan Thompson
- Runners-up: (Japan) Go Soeda (Japan) Yasutaka Uchiyama
- Score: 6–3, 5–7, [10–6]

Events
Singles	Doubles
← 2017 ·	Shimadzu All Japan Indoor Tennis Championships

Sanchai and Sonchat Ratiwatana were the defending champions but lost in the first round to Gong Maoxin and Hsieh Cheng-peng.

Luke Saville and Jordan Thompson won the title after defeating Go Soeda and Yasutaka Uchiyama 6–3, 5–7, [10–6] in the final.

== Seeds ==
1. (Thailand) Sanchai Ratiwatana / (Thailand) Sonchat Ratiwatana (first round)
2. (India) Jeevan Nedunchezhiyan / (Indonesia) Christopher Rungkat (first round)
3. (Australia) Luke Saville / (Australia) Jordan Thompson (champions)
4. (Chinese Taipei) Peng Hsien-yin / (Sweden) Andreas Siljeström (first round)

== Draw ==
=== Key ===
- Q = Qualifier
- WC = Wild card
- LL = Lucky loser
- Alt = Alternate
- SE = Special exempt
- PR = Protected ranking
- ITF = ITF entry
- JE = Junior exempt
- w/o = Walkover
- r = Retired
- d = Defaulted
- SR = Special ranking

First round
1	(Thailand) Sa Ratiwatana (Thailand) So Ratiwatana	6^{6}	4
(China) M Gong (Chinese Taipei) C-p Hsieh	7^{8}	6
(Germany) T Kamke (Germany) T Pütz	6	2	[10]
(Australia) M Purcell (Australia) A Whittington	4	6	[6]
3	(Australia) L Saville (Australia) J Thompson	7^{7}	6
WC	(Japan) T Ito (Japan) K Uesugi	6^{3}	3
(Japan) T Matsui (Chinese Taipei) C-h Yi	7^{7}	4	[11]
(United Kingdom) B Klein (Switzerland) L Margaroli	6^{5}	6	[13]
(Turkey) T Altuna (Poland) H Hurkacz	6	2	[10]
WC	(Japan) Sora Fukuda (Japan) Y Shimizu	1	6	[8]
(Japan) G Soeda (Japan) Y Uchiyama	6	6
4	(Chinese Taipei) H-y Peng (Sweden) A Siljeström	4	4
WC	(Japan) Daiki Hayashi (Japan) Kosuke Shibano	5	1
(India) S Balaji (India) P Gunneswaran	7	6
(China) Z Li (France) S Robert	6	6
2	(India) J Nedunchezhiyan (Indonesia) C Rungkat	3	1

Quarterfinals
(China) M Gong (Chinese Taipei) C-p Hsieh	6^{3}	6	[10]
(Germany) T Kamke (Germany) T Pütz	7^{7}	2	[3]
3	(Australia) L Saville (Australia) J Thompson	7^{7}	7
(United Kingdom) B Klein (Switzerland) L Margaroli	6^{1}	5
(Turkey) T Altuna (Poland) H Hurkacz	2	1
(Japan) G Soeda (Japan) Y Uchiyama	6	6
(India) S Balaji (India) P Gunneswaran	6	6
(China) Z Li (France) S Robert	4	4

Semifinals
(China) M Gong (Chinese Taipei) C-p Hsieh	7^{8}	6^{8}	[3]
3	(Australia) L Saville (Australia) J Thompson	6^{6}	7^{10}	[10]
(Japan) G Soeda (Japan) Y Uchiyama	6	7^{8}
(India) S Balaji (India) P Gunneswaran	4	6^{6}

Final
3	(Australia) L Saville (Australia) J Thompson	6	5	[10]
(Japan) G Soeda (Japan) Y Uchiyama	3	7	[6]
