= 2018 Shimadzu All Japan Indoor Tennis Championships – Singles =

Singles
- 2018 Shimadzu All Japan Indoor Tennis Championships

Final
- Champion: (Australia) John Millman
- Runner-up: (Australia) Jordan Thompson
- Score: 7–5, 6–1

Events
Singles	Doubles
← 2017 ·	Shimadzu All Japan Indoor Tennis Championships

Yasutaka Uchiyama was the defending champion but lost in the first round to Michał Przysiężny.

John Millman won the title after defeating Jordan Thompson 7–5, 6–1 in the final.

== Seeds ==
1. (Australia) John Millman (champion)
2. (Australia) Jordan Thompson (final)
3. (Japan) Go Soeda (quarterfinals)
4. (France) Stéphane Robert (first round)
5. (Japan) Tatsuma Ito (second round)
6. (South Korea) Kwon Soon-woo (second round)
7. (Poland) Hubert Hurkacz (quarterfinals)
8. (Japan) Yasutaka Uchiyama (first round)

== Draw ==
=== Key ===
- Q = Qualifier
- WC = Wild card
- LL = Lucky loser
- Alt = Alternate
- SE = Special exempt
- PR = Protected ranking
- ITF = ITF entry
- JE = Junior exempt
- w/o = Walkover
- r = Retired
- d = Defaulted
- SR = Special ranking

=== Finals ===
Semifinals
1	(Australia) John Millman	6	6
Q	(Australia) Blake Ellis	3	4
(Germany) Tim Pütz	6	5	4
2	(Australia) Jordan Thompson	3	7	6

Final
1	(Australia) John Millman	7	6
2	(Australia) Jordan Thompson	5	1

=== Top half ===
First round
1	(Australia) J Millman	6	6
(China) D Wu	4	4
(United Kingdom) B Klein	6	3	7^{7}
(China) Ze Zhang	3	6	6^{5}
(Australia) M Purcell	6	6
(Australia) M Banes	4	4
Q	(Japan) Yuya Kibi	5	3
7	(Poland) H Hurkacz	7	6
3	(Japan) G Soeda	7^{8}	0	7^{7}
WC	(Japan) Y Watanuki	6^{6}	6	6^{2}
(Australia) A Whittington	6	6
WC	(Japan) Sora Fukuda	3	3
(Japan) Y Takahashi	7^{7}	4	4
Q	(Australia) B Ellis	6^{4}	6	6
WC	(Japan) Y Shimizu	2	3
5	(Japan) T Ito	6	6

Second round
1	(Australia) J Millman	7^{7}	6^{6}	6
(United Kingdom) B Klein	6^{3}	7^{8}	3
(Australia) M Purcell	1	4
7	(Poland) H Hurkacz	6	6
3	(Japan) G Soeda	6	6
(Australia) A Whittington	4	1
Q	(Australia) B Ellis	4	6	6
5	(Japan) T Ito	6	3	4

Quarterfinals
1	(Australia) J Millman	4	6	6
7	(Poland) H Hurkacz	6	3	2
3	(Japan) G Soeda	3	7	5
Q	(Australia) B Ellis	6	5	7

Semifinals
1	(Australia) J Millman	6	6
Q	(Australia) B Ellis	3	4

=== Bottom half ===
First round
8	(Japan) Y Uchiyama	6	4	6^{3}
PR	(Poland) M Przysiężny	4	6	7^{7}
(Germany) T Kamke	6	6
(Israel) E Leshem	2	2
(Turkey) C İlkel	3	2
(Germany) T Pütz	6	6
(India) P Gunneswaran	6	1	6
4	(France) S Robert	3	6	4
6	(South Korea) S-w Kwon	6	7^{7}
(Italy) M Donati	4	6^{5}
(Japan) K Uchida	6	3
Q	(Zimbabwe) T Garanganga	4	1^{r}
(Russia) K Kravchuk	6	7
WC	(Japan) Shintaro Imai	4	5
Q	(China) Z Li	6	6^{4}	4
2	(Australia) J Thompson	4	7^{7}	6

Second round
PR	(Poland) M Przysiężny	3	4
(Germany) T Kamke	6	6
(Germany) T Pütz	7^{7}	6
(India) P Gunneswaran	6^{5}	2
6	(South Korea) S-w Kwon	4	7^{12}	6^{7}
(Japan) K Uchida	6	6^{10}	7^{9}
(Russia) K Kravchuk	3	1
2	(Australia) J Thompson	6	6

Quarterfinals
(Germany) T Kamke	4	0
(Germany) T Pütz	6	6
(Japan) K Uchida	6^{5}	0
2	(Australia) J Thompson	7^{7}	6

Semifinals
(Germany) T Pütz	6	5	4
2	(Australia) J Thompson	3	7	6
