= 2023 Los Cabos Open – Singles =

Singles
- 2023 Los Cabos Open

Final
- Champion: (Greece) Stefanos Tsitsipas
- Runner-up: (Australia) Alex de Minaur
- Score: 6–3, 6–4

Details
- Draw: 28 (4 Q / 3 WC )
- Seeds: 8

Events
Singles	Doubles
← 2022 ·	Los Cabos Open	· 2024 →

Stefanos Tsitsipas defeated Alex de Minaur in the final, 6–3, 6–4 to win the singles title at the 2023 Los Cabos Open. It was his tenth ATP Tour singles title.

Daniil Medvedev was the reigning champion, but chose not to defend his title.

This marked the first time in the Open Era that five Chilean players were in the main draw of an ATP Tour tournament held outside of Chile.

== Seeds ==
The top four seeds received a bye into the second round.

1. (Greece) Stefanos Tsitsipas (champion)
2. (United Kingdom) Cameron Norrie (second round)
3. (United States) Tommy Paul (quarterfinals)
4. (Croatia) Borna Ćorić (semifinals)
5. (Australia) Alex de Minaur (final)
6. (Chile) Nicolás Jarry (quarterfinals)
7. (Germany) Dominik Koepfer (semifinals)
8. Ilya Ivashka (quarterfinals)

== Draw ==
=== Key ===
- Q = Qualifier
- WC = Wild card
- LL = Lucky loser
- Alt = Alternate
- SE = Special exempt
- PR = Protected ranking
- ITF = ITF entry
- JE = Junior exempt
- w/o = Walkover
- r = Retired
- d = Defaulted
- SR = Special ranking

=== Finals ===
Semifinals
1	(Greece) Stefanos Tsitsipas	6	6
4	(Croatia) Borna Ćorić	3	2
5	(Australia) Alex de Minaur	6	6^{5}	6
7	(Germany) Dominik Koepfer	2	7^{7}	1

Final
1	(Greece) Stefanos Tsitsipas	6	6
5	(Australia) Alex de Minaur	3	4

=== Top half ===
First round
(Australia) R Hijikata	2	6^{4}
(United States) J Isner	6	7^{7}
(Canada) G Diallo	2	6	2
(Netherlands) G Brouwer	6	4	6
WC	(Mexico) R Pacheco Méndez	3	1
6/WC	(Chile) N Jarry	6	6
LL	(Chinese Taipei) J Jung	3	7^{7}	6
WC	(Mexico) E Escobedo	6	6^{5}	2
(Croatia) B Gojo	7	4	6
(Chile) C Garín	5	6	3
Q	(Kazakhstan) B Zhukayev	6	3	6^{5}
8	I Ivashka	3	6	7^{7}

Second round
1	(Greece) S Tsitsipas	6	6
(United States) J Isner	2	4
(Netherlands) G Brouwer	6^{5}	6	4
6/WC	(Chile) N Jarry	7^{7}	4	6
4	(Croatia) B Ćorić	6	6
LL	(Chinese Taipei) J Jung	1	2
(Croatia) B Gojo	7	2	4
8	I Ivashka	5	6	6

Quarterfinals
1	(Greece) S Tsitsipas	6^{6}	7^{7}	6
6/WC	(Chile) N Jarry	7^{8}	6^{4}	2
4	(Croatia) B Ćorić	6	6
8	I Ivashka	3	4

Semifinals
1	(Greece) S Tsitsipas	6	6
4	(Croatia) B Ćorić	3	2

=== Bottom half ===
First round
5	(Australia) A de Minaur	6	6
Q	(Tunisia) S Mansouri	4	4
Q	(Chile) G Lama	6^{3}	2
(Argentina) TA Tirante	7^{7}	6
(Chile) A Tabilo	2	4
(Brazil) F Meligeni Alves	6	6
7	(Germany) D Koepfer	6	6
(Chile) T Barrios Vera	4	3
(Finland) O Virtanen	3	0
(Australia) J Duckworth	6	6
(United States) A Kovacevic	6	7
Q	(United States) O Kumar	2	5

Second round
5	(Australia) A de Minaur	6	6
(Argentina) TA Tirante	2	1
(Brazil) F Meligeni Alves	5	6^{7}
3	(United States) T Paul	7	7^{9}
7	(Germany) D Koepfer	6	6
(Australia) J Duckworth	2	2
(United States) A Kovacevic	5	7^{9}	6
2	(United Kingdom) C Norrie	7	6^{7}	4

Quarterfinals
5	(Australia) A de Minaur	6	3	6
3	(United States) T Paul	4	6	3
7	(Germany) D Koepfer	6	7
(United States) A Kovacevic	4	5

Semifinals
5	(Australia) A de Minaur	6	6^{5}	6
7	(Germany) D Koepfer	2	7^{7}	1

== Qualifying ==
=== Seeds ===
1. (Japan) Kaichi Uchida (first round)
2. (Argentina) Renzo Olivo (first round, retired)
3. (Jordan) Abdullah Shelbayh (qualifying competition)
4. (Kazakhstan) Beibit Zhukayev (qualified)
5. (United States) Patrick Kypson (first round)
6. (Chinese Taipei) Jason Jung (qualifying competition, lucky loser)
7. (Tunisia) Skander Mansouri (qualified)
8. (Brazil) Eduardo Ribeiro (first round)

=== Qualifiers ===
1. (Chile) Gonzalo Lama
2. (United States) Omni Kumar
3. (Tunisia) Skander Mansouri
4. (Kazakhstan) Beibit Zhukayev

=== Lucky loser ===
1. (Chinese Taipei) Jason Jung

=== Qualifying draw ===
==== First qualifier ====
First round
1	(Japan) Kaichi Uchida	4	2
(Chile) Gonzalo Lama	6	6
WC	(Mexico) Luis Carlos Álvarez	6	6
8	(Brazil) Eduardo Ribeiro	4	4

Qualifying competition
(Chile) Gonzalo Lama	7	5	6
WC	(Mexico) Luis Carlos Álvarez	5	7	4

==== Second qualifier ====
First round
2	(Argentina) Renzo Olivo	1	1^{r}
(United States) Omni Kumar	6	4
(Moldova) Alexandr Cozbinov	0	1
6	(Chinese Taipei) Jason Jung	6	6

Qualifying competition
(United States) Omni Kumar	6	4	7^{7}
6	(Chinese Taipei) Jason Jung	4	6	6^{3}

==== Third qualifier ====
First round
3	(Jordan) Abdullah Shelbayh	6	6
(United States) Nick Chappell	3	2
(Peru) Jorge Panta	4	2
7	(Tunisia) Skander Mansouri	6	6

Qualifying competition
3	(Jordan) Abdullah Shelbayh	6^{3}	3
7	(Tunisia) Skander Mansouri	7^{7}	6

==== Fourth qualifier ====
First round
4	(Kazakhstan) Beibit Zhukayev	7^{11}	6
WC	(Mexico) Luca Lemaitre	6^{9}	4
(United States) Keegan Smith	6	6^{4}	6
5	(United States) Patrick Kypson	3	7^{7}	2

Qualifying competition
4	(Kazakhstan) Beibit Zhukayev	6	6
(United States) Keegan Smith	3	1
