= 2024 Los Cabos Open – Singles =

Singles
- 2024 Los Cabos Open

Final
- Champion: (Australia) Jordan Thompson
- Runner-up: (Norway) Casper Ruud
- Score: 6–3, 7–6^{(7–4)}

Details
- Draw: 28 (4 Q / 3 WC )
- Seeds: 8

Events
Singles	Doubles
← 2023 ·	Los Cabos Open	· 2025 →

Jordan Thompson defeated Casper Ruud in the final, 6–3, 7–6^{(7–4)} to win the singles tennis title at the 2024 Los Cabos Open. It was his first ATP Tour singles title and he saved three match points en route, in the quarterfinals against Alex Michelsen.

Stefanos Tsitsipas was the defending champion, but lost in the semifinals to Ruud.

== Seeds ==
The top four seeds received a bye into the second round.

1. (Germany) Alexander Zverev (semifinals)
2. (Greece) Stefanos Tsitsipas (semifinals)
3. (Australia) Alex de Minaur (second round)
4. (Norway) Casper Ruud (final)
5. Roman Safiullin (first round)
6. (Serbia) Miomir Kecmanović (first round)
7. (Australia) Max Purcell (second round)
8. (Australia) Jordan Thompson (champion)

== Draw ==
=== Key ===
- Q = Qualifier
- WC = Wild card
- LL = Lucky loser
- Alt = Alternate
- ITF = ITF entry
- PR = Protected ranking
- SR = Special ranking
- SE = Special exempt
- JE = Junior exempt
- JR = Junior Accelerator Programme entrant
- CO = College Accelerator Programme entrant
- NG = Next Gen Accelerator Program entrant
- w/o = Walkover
- r = Retired
- d = Defaulted

=== Finals ===
Semifinals
1	(Germany) Alexander Zverev	5	6	6^{2}
8	(Australia) Jordan Thompson	7	4	7^{7}
4	(Norway) Casper Ruud	6	7^{7}
2	(Greece) Stefanos Tsitsipas	4	6^{4}

Final
8	(Australia) Jordan Thompson	6	7^{7}
4	(Norway) Casper Ruud	3	6^{4}

=== Top half ===
First round
Q	(Italy) F Cobolli	1	0
(Japan) Y Nishioka	6	6
(Australia) T Kokkinakis	4	7^{7}	6
(United Kingdom) J Draper	6	6^{5}	4
(United Kingdom) D Evans	6	6
5	R Safiullin	2	4
(France) C Lestienne	3	6^{3}
(United States) A Michelsen	6	7^{7}
WC	(Argentina) D Schwartzman	4	3
Q	(United States) E Nava	6	6
WC	(Mexico) E Escobedo	4	3
8	(Australia) J Thompson	6	6

Second round
1	(Germany) A Zverev	6	6
(Japan) Y Nishioka	3	0
(Australia) T Kokkinakis	6	6
(United Kingdom) D Evans	4	2
3	(Australia) A de Minaur	4	1
(United States) A Michelsen	6	6
Q	(United States) E Nava	6^{5}	3
8	(Australia) J Thompson	7^{7}	6

Quarterfinals
1	(Germany) A Zverev	6	6
(Australia) T Kokkinakis	3	4
(United States) A Michelsen	6	6^{1}	5
8	(Australia) J Thompson	0	7^{7}	7

Semifinals
1	(Germany) A Zverev	5	6	6^{2}
8	(Australia) J Thompson	7	4	7^{7}

=== Bottom half ===
First round
7	(Australia) M Purcell	6	4	6
(Italy) M Arnaldi	4	6	4
(Germany) D Koepfer	6^{2}	2
(Portugal) N Borges	7^{7}	6
(Japan) T Daniel	4	5
(United States) M Giron	6	7
6	(Serbia) M Kecmanović	3	6^{2}
(Australia) R Hijikata	6	7^{7}
Q	(United States) A Kovacevic	6	6
Q	(United States) B Holt	1	4
(Australia) A Vukic	7^{7}	7^{12}
WC	(Mexico) R Pacheco Méndez	6^{5}	6^{10}

Second round
7	(Australia) M Purcell	3	3
(Portugal) N Borges	6	6
(United States) M Giron	1	0
4	(Norway) C Ruud	6	6
(Australia) R Hijikata	3	6	4
Q	(United States) A Kovacevic	6	4	6
(Australia) A Vukic	3	0
2	(Greece) S Tsitsipas	6	6

Quarterfinals
(Portugal) N Borges	3	2
4	(Norway) C Ruud	6	6
Q	(United States) A Kovacevic	6^{1}	3
2	(Greece) S Tsitsipas	7^{7}	6

Semifinals
4	(Norway) C Ruud	6	7^{7}
2	(Greece) S Tsitsipas	4	6^{4}

== Qualifying ==
=== Seeds ===
1. (Italy) Flavio Cobolli (qualified)
2. (United States) Aleksandar Kovacevic (qualified)
3. (Japan) Yosuke Watanuki (qualifying competition)
4. (Japan) Shintaro Mochizuki (first round)
5. (France) Térence Atmane (first round)
6. (United States) Emilio Nava (qualified)
7. (United States) Zachary Svajda (qualifying competition)
8. (United States) Nicolas Moreno de Alboran (first round)

=== Qualifiers ===
1. (Italy) Flavio Cobolli
2. (United States) Aleksandar Kovacevic
3. (United States) Brandon Holt
4. (United States) Emilio Nava

=== Qualifying draw ===
==== First qualifier ====
First round
1	(Italy) Flavio Cobolli	3	6	6
(Japan) Sho Shimabukuro	6	3	2
(Australia) Marc Polmans	6	6
8	(United States) Nicolas Moreno de Alboran	3	2

Qualifying competition
1	(Italy) Flavio Cobolli	6	6
(Australia) Marc Polmans	3	3

==== Second qualifier ====
First round
2	(United States) Aleksandar Kovacevic	7	6
(United States) Steve Johnson	5	3
(Argentina) Guido Andreozzi	0	1
7	(United States) Zachary Svajda	6	6

Qualifying competition
2	(United States) Aleksandar Kovacevic	6	6
7	(United States) Zachary Svajda	4	4

==== Third qualifier ====
First round
3	(Japan) Yosuke Watanuki	6	3	6
WC	(Mexico) Alan Fernando Rubio Fierros	2	6	4
Alt	(United States) Brandon Holt	6	6
5	(France) Térence Atmane	4	4

Qualifying competition
3	(Japan) Yosuke Watanuki	4	3
Alt	(United States) Brandon Holt	6	6

==== Fourth qualifier ====
First round
4	(Japan) Shintaro Mochizuki	5	5
Alt	(United States) Aidan Mayo	7	7
WC	(Colombia) Nicolás Mejía	3	6	5
6	(United States) Emilio Nava	6	1	7

Qualifying competition
Alt	(United States) Aidan Mayo	5	5
6	(United States) Emilio Nava	7	7
