= 2016 Vietnam Open (tennis) – Singles =

Singles
- 2016 Vietnam Open (tennis)

Final
- Champion: (Australia) Jordan Thompson
- Runner-up: (Japan) Go Soeda
- Score: 5–7, 7–5, 6–1

Events
Singles	Doubles
← 2015 ·	Vietnam Open	· 2017 →

Saketh Myneni was the defending champion but lost in the second round to Taro Daniel.

Jordan Thompson won the title after defeating Go Soeda 5–7, 7–5, 6–1 in the final.

== Seeds ==
1. (Tunisia) Malek Jaziri (first round)
2. (Israel) Dudi Sela (second round)
3. (Japan) Taro Daniel (quarterfinals)
4. (Australia) Jordan Thompson (champion)
5. (Ukraine) Sergiy Stakhovsky (quarterfinals)
6. (Japan) Go Soeda (final)
7. (Switzerland) Henri Laaksonen (semifinals)
8. (Japan) Tatsuma Ito (quarterfinals)

== Draw ==
=== Key ===
- Q = Qualifier
- WC = Wild card
- LL = Lucky loser
- Alt = Alternate
- SE = Special exempt
- PR = Protected ranking
- ITF = ITF entry
- JE = Junior exempt
- w/o = Walkover
- r = Retired
- d = Defaulted
- SR = Special ranking

=== Finals ===
Semifinals
(Japan) Yasutaka Uchiyama	4	3
6	(Japan) Go Soeda	6	6
4	(Australia) Jordan Thompson	6	4	6
7	(Switzerland) Henri Laaksonen	2	6	4

Final
6	(Japan) Go Soeda	7	5	1
4	(Australia) Jordan Thompson	5	7	6

=== Top half ===
First round
1	(Tunisia) M Jaziri	1	6	6^{4}
(Japan) Y Uchiyama	6	3	7^{7}
(Japan) H Moriya	4	0
(Japan) A Santillan	6	6
WC	(France) Maxime Tabatruong	4	4
WC	(Vietnam) NH Lý	6	6
Q	(India) VS Prashanth	3	7^{7}	1
8	(Japan) T Ito	6	6^{3}	6
3	(Japan) T Daniel	6	6
(United States) S Kozlov	4	3
(Australia) A Whittington	2	4
(India) S Myneni	6	6
(India) P Gunneswaran	7^{7}	3
(Italy) A Arnaboldi	6^{1}	2^{r}
WC	(Indonesia) C Rungkat	7	3	1
6	(Japan) G Soeda	5	6	6

Second round
(Japan) Y Uchiyama	6	6
(Japan) A Santillan	2	4
WC	(Vietnam) NH Lý	2	1
8	(Japan) T Ito	6	6
3	(Japan) T Daniel	6	0
(India) S Myneni	1	0^{r}
(India) P Gunneswaran	6	3	2
6	(Japan) G Soeda	4	6	6

Quarterfinals
(Japan) Y Uchiyama	6	6
8	(Japan) T Ito	3	4
3	(Japan) T Daniel	3	2
6	(Japan) G Soeda	6	6

Semifinals
(Japan) Y Uchiyama	4	3
6	(Japan) G Soeda	6	6

=== Bottom half ===
First round
5	(Ukraine) S Stakhovsky	6	6
(Germany) Y Hanfmann	3	4
Q	(India) S Singh	6	6
(Japan) Yuya Kibi	4	4
Q	(Japan) Shuichi Sekiguchi	6	6
WC	(Vietnam) TH Nguyễn	1	3
Q	(France) Laurent Rochette	2	3
4	(Australia) J Thompson	6	6
7	(Switzerland) H Laaksonen	6	6
(United States) M Krueger	4	1
(Australia) M Matosevic	6	6
(Chinese Taipei) J Wang	2	2
(India) R Ramanathan	4	6^{1}
(Germany) P Gojowczyk	6	7^{7}
(Germany) D Masur	6	2	3
2	(Israel) D Sela	0	6	6

Second round
5	(Ukraine) S Stakhovsky	6	7
Q	(India) S Singh	1	5
Q	(Japan) S Sekiguchi	3	3
4	(Australia) J Thompson	6	6
7	(Switzerland) H Laaksonen	2	6	6
(Australia) M Matosevic	6	4	3
(Germany) P Gojowczyk	6	7^{7}
2	(Israel) D Sela	1	6^{3}

Quarterfinals
5	(Ukraine) S Stakhovsky	4	7^{7}	2
4	(Australia) J Thompson	6	6^{4}	6
7	(Switzerland) H Laaksonen	7^{10}	7
(Germany) P Gojowczyk	6^{8}	5

Semifinals
4	(Australia) J Thompson	6	4	6
7	(Switzerland) H Laaksonen	2	6	4
