= 2014 Australian Open – Main draw wildcard entries =

- Date: December – January
- Edition: 102nd
- Category: Grand Slam (ITF)
- Location: Shenzhen, Guangdong Province, China; Melbourne, Victoria, Australia; Atlanta, Georgia, United States
- Australian Open – Main draw wildcard entries

The 2014 Australian Open wildcard playoffs and entries are a group of events and internal selections to choose the eight men and women wildcard entries for the 2014 Australian Open. Tennis Australia awards eight wildcards each for the men's and women's professional singles and doubles competitions.

Four wildcards each were awarded by internal selection to Australian players. Also, one wildcard each was given to the winners of the Australian Wildcard Playoff, a tournament between Australian players who did not receive direct entry into the draw. Jordan Thompson and Casey Dellacqua were the winners of this tournament.

In an agreement with the United States Tennis Association and the French Tennis Federation, Tennis Australia gives one man and one woman from the United States and France each a wildcard into the Australian Open. The French players were chosen by internal selection, while another playoff, held 20 to 22 December 2013, determined the two US-American players receiving wildcards.

Since the Australian Open are promoted as the "Grand Slam of Asia/Pacific", one male and one female player from this geographical area were awarded a wildcard. This was decided through the Asia Pacific Australian Open Wildcard Playoff with Wu Di and Tang Haochen, both from China, winning the tournament. At the same event, one male and one female doubles team won wildcards (results see below), and one wildcard each was contested in boys and girls singles, with Sun Fajing and Zheng Wushuang winning the tournament respectively.

== Wildcard entries ==
These are the wildcard qualifiers, from both internal selections and playoffs.

=== Men's singles ===
Country	Name	Method of Qualification
CHN	Wu Di	Asia-Pacific Wildcard – Playoff
AUS	Jordan Thompson	Australian Wildcard – Playoff
USA	Steve Johnson	USA Wildcard – Playoff
FRA	Lucas Pouille	French Wildcard – Internal Selection
AUS	James Duckworth	Australian Wildcard – Internal Selection
AUS	Samuel Groth	Australian Wildcard – Internal Selection
AUS	Thanasi Kokkinakis	Australian Wildcard – Internal Selection
AUS	Nick Kyrgios	Australian Wildcard – Internal Selection

=== Women's singles ===
Country	Name	Method of Qualification
CHN	Tang Haochen	Asia-Pacific Wildcard – Playoff
AUS	Casey Dellacqua	Australian Wildcard – Playoff
USA	Sachia Vickery	USA Wildcard – Playoff
FRA	Pauline Parmentier	French Wildcard – Internal Selection
AUS	Jarmila Gajdošová	Australian Wildcard – Internal Selection
AUS	Ashleigh Barty	Australian Wildcard – Internal Selection
AUS	Storm Sanders	Australian Wildcard – Internal Selection
AUS	Olivia Rogowska	Australian Wildcard – Internal Selection

=== Men's doubles ===
Country	Name	Method of Qualification
IND; NZL	Yuki Bhambri; Michael Venus	Asia-Pacific Wildcard – Playoff

=== Women's doubles ===
Country	Name	Method of Qualification
CHN; JPN	Han Xinyun; Miki Miyamura	Asia-Pacific Wildcard – Playoff

== Asia-Pacific Wildcard Playoff ==
=== Men's singles ===
Quarterfinals
1	(Chinese Taipei) Jimmy Wang	6	6
(China) Cai Zhao	0	1
4	(China) Zhang Ze	5	6	6
WC	(Chinese Taipei) Wang Chieh-Fu	7	2	2
WC	(China) Li Zhe	3	3
3	(China) Wu Di	6	6
Q	(China) Zhu Zhicheng	2	1
2	(India) Yuki Bhambri	6	6

Semifinals
1	(Chinese Taipei) Jimmy Wang	2	4
4	(China) Zhang Ze	6	6
3	(China) Wu Di	7^{8}	6
2	(India) Yuki Bhambri	6^{6}	4

Final
4	(China) Zhang Ze	0	3
3	(China) Wu Di	6	6

=== Women's singles ===
Quarterfinals
(China) Liu Fangzhou	6	6
WC	(China) Yang Zhaoxuan	3	4
3	(Japan) Risa Ozaki	6	6
WC	(Chinese Taipei) Chan Chin-wei	2	4
Q	(China) Tang Haochen	6	6
Q	(China) Han Xinyun	1	1
(China) Wang Yafan	6	6
2	(Japan) Erika Sema	4	1

Semifinals
(China) Liu Fangzhou	2	1
3	(Japan) Risa Ozaki	6	6
Q	(China) Tang Haochen	7^{7}	6
(China) Wang Yafan	6^{3}	2

Final
3	(Japan) Risa Ozaki	3	3
Q	(China) Tang Haochen	6	6

=== Men's doubles ===
Semifinals
1	(Chinese Taipei) Lee Hsin-han (Chinese Taipei) Peng Hsien-yin	6^{0}	7^{7}	[7]
4	(China) Gong Maoxin (China) Li Zhe	7^{7}	6^{4}	[10]
3/WC	(Chinese Taipei) Wang Chieh-fu (Chinese Taipei) Jimmy Wang	2	0
2	(India) Yuki Bhambri (New Zealand) Michael Venus	6	6

Final
4	(China) Gong Maoxin (China) Li Zhe	6^{3}	6	[5]
2	(India) Yuki Bhambri (New Zealand) Michael Venus	7^{7}	1	[10]

=== Women's doubles ===
Semifinals
1	(Chinese Taipei) Chan Chin-wei (China) Xu Yifan	6	4	[10]
(China) Tang Haochen (China) Yang Zhaoxuan	4	6	[12]
WC	(China) Tian Ran (China) Wang Yafan	3	1
2	(China) Han Xinyun (Japan) Miki Miyamura	6	6

Final
(China) Tang Haochen (China) Yang Zhaoxuan	6	4	[8]
2	(China) Han Xinyun (Japan) Miki Miyamura	4	6	[10]

== Australian Wildcard Playoff ==
The Australian Wildcard Playoff took place from Tuesday, December 9, to Sunday, December 15, 2013.

=== Men's singles ===
First round
1	(Australia) John-Patrick Smith	6	6	6
(Australia) Marc Polmans	4	4	4
7	(Australia) Dane Propoggia	6	7	7^{7}
(Australia) Gavin van Peperzeel	4	5	6^{1}
4	(Australia) Jordan Thompson	6	6	5	7^{7}
(Australia) Blake Mott	2	4	7	6^{3}
5	(Australia) Alex Bolt	7	6	6
(Australia) Oliver Anderson	5	3	4
(Australia) Max Purcell	1	1	1
6	(Australia) Andrew Whittington	6	6	6
(Australia) Harry Bourchier	4	1	0
3	(Australia) Benjamin Mitchell	6	6	6
(Australia) Bradley Mousley	4	6^{2}	6	6	5
8	(Australia) Luke Saville	6	7^{7}	2	2	7
(Australia) Akira Santillan	6	6	4	4	6
2	(Australia) Matt Reid	2	2	6	6	3

Quarterfinals
1	(Australia) John-Patrick Smith	6	6	7
7	(Australia) Dane Propoggia	4	4	5
4	(Australia) Jordan Thompson	6^{1}	6	7^{8}	6
5	(Australia) Alex Bolt	7^{7}	2	6^{6}	3
6	(Australia) Andrew Whittington	4	4	4
3	(Australia) Benjamin Mitchell	6	6	6
8	(Australia) Luke Saville	6	6	6
(Australia) Akira Santillan	4	4	2

Semifinals
1	(Australia) John-Patrick Smith	6^{4}	4	6	3
4	(Australia) Jordan Thompson	7^{7}	6	2	6
3	(Australia) Benjamin Mitchell	6	6	6
8	(Australia) Luke Saville	2	4	1

Final
4	(Australia) Jordan Thompson	6	6	4	4	6
3	(Australia) Benjamin Mitchell	3	2	6	6	1

=== Women's singles ===
First round
1	(Australia) Casey Dellacqua	6	6
(Australia) Maddison Inglis	2	1
6	(Australia) Monique Adamczak	6	6
(Australia) Azra Hadzic	4	3
4	(Australia) Jarmila Gajdošová	6	6
(Australia) Jelena Dokic	2	4
8	(Australia) Tammi Patterson	6	6
(Australia) Sara Tomic	2	4
(Australia) Kimberly Birrell	1	7	6
5	(Australia) Storm Sanders	6	5	8
(Australia) Sally Peers	3	1
3	(Australia) Arina Rodionova	6	6
(Australia) Olivia Tjandramulia	3	1
7	(Australia) Viktorija Rajicic	6	6
(Australia) Jessica Moore	5	6	9
2	(Australia) Anastasia Rodionova	7	1	7

Quarterfinals
1	(Australia) Casey Dellacqua	0	6	6
6	(Australia) Monique Adamczak	6	1	2
4	(Australia) Jarmila Gajdošová	5	6	3
8	(Australia) Tammi Patterson	7	2	6
5	(Australia) Storm Sanders
3	(Australia) Arina Rodionova	w/o
7	(Australia) Viktorija Rajicic	6	3	6
(Australia) Jessica Moore	2	6	2

Semifinals
1	(Australia) Casey Dellacqua	7	6
8	(Australia) Tammi Patterson	5	3
3	(Australia) Arina Rodionova	6	6
7	(Australia) Viktorija Rajicic	1	4

Final
1	(Australia) Casey Dellacqua	5	6	6
3	(Australia) Arina Rodionova	7	1	0

== US Wildcard Playoff ==
=== Men's singles ===
Quarterfinals
1	(United States) Denis Kudla	6	6
(United States) Jarmere Jenkins	4	1
4	(United States) Tennys Sandgren	6	6
(United States) Austin Krajicek	3	0
(United States) Bjorn Fratangelo	3	6^{2}
3	(United States) Steve Johnson	6	7^{7}
(United States) Chase Buchanan	4	7^{7}	6
2	(United States) Rhyne Williams	6	6^{4}	3

Semifinals
1	(United States) Denis Kudla	3	6^{5}
4	(United States) Tennys Sandgren	6	7^{7}
3	(United States) Steve Johnson	6	6
(United States) Chase Buchanan	0	4

Final
4	(United States) Tennys Sandgren	6	3	6	6^{5}	1
3	(United States) Steve Johnson	4	6	0	7^{7}	6

=== Women's singles ===
Quarterfinals
1	(United States) Shelby Rogers	6	6
(United States) Sanaz Marand	4	2
4	(United States) Victoria Duval	7	7
(United States) Maria Sanchez	5	5
(United States) Nicole Gibbs	6	3	5
3	(United States) Grace Min	4	6	7
(United States) Sachia Vickery	4	6	6
2	(United States) Madison Brengle	6	4	3

Semifinals
1	(United States) Shelby Rogers	4	5
4	(United States) Victoria Duval	6	7
3	(United States) Grace Min	3	7^{7}	4
(United States) Sachia Vickery	6	6^{3}	6

Final
4	(United States) Victoria Duval	2	3
(United States) Sachia Vickery	6	6
