= 2024 Los Cabos Open – Doubles =

Doubles
- 2024 Los Cabos Open

Final
- Champions: (Australia) Max Purcell (Australia) Jordan Thompson
- Runners-up: (Ecuador) Gonzalo Escobar (Kazakhstan) Aleksandr Nedovyesov
- Score: 7–5, 7–6^{(7–2)}

Events
Singles	Doubles
- Los Cabos Open

Max Purcell and Jordan Thompson defeated Gonzalo Escobar and Aleksandr Nedovyesov in the final, 7–5, 7–6^{(7–2)} to win the doubles tennis title at the 2024 Los Cabos Open.

Santiago González and Édouard Roger-Vasselin were the reigning champions, but Roger-Vasselin chose to compete in Doha instead. González partnered Neal Skupski, but lost in the quarterfinals to Escobar and Nedovyesov.

== Seeds ==
1. (Mexico) Santiago González / (United Kingdom) Neal Skupski (quarterfinals)
2. (Monaco) Hugo Nys / (Poland) Jan Zieliński (first round)
3. (Finland) Harri Heliövaara / (Australia) John Peers (first round)
4. (Australia) Max Purcell / (Australia) Jordan Thompson (champions)

== Draw ==
Key

- Q = Qualifier
- WC = Wild card
- LL = Lucky loser
- Alt = Alternate
- ITF = ITF entry
- PR = Protected ranking
- SR = Special ranking
- SE = Special exempt
- JE = Junior exempt
- JR = Junior Accelerator Programme entrant
- CO = College Accelerator Programme entrant
- NG = Next Gen Accelerator Program entrant
- w/o = Walkover
- r = Retired
- d = Defaulted

=== Draw ===
First round
1	(Mexico) S González (United Kingdom) N Skupski	6	7
WC	(Mexico) R Pacheco Méndez (Argentina) D Schwartzman	2	5
(Ecuador) D Hidalgo (Colombia) C Rodríguez	2	4
(Ecuador) G Escobar (Kazakhstan) A Nedovyesov	6	6
3	(Finland) H Heliövaara (Australia) J Peers	6	6^{6}	[9]
(Argentina) G Andreozzi (Mexico) MÁ Reyes-Varela	1	7^{8}	[11]
WC	(Mexico) H Hach Verdugo (Venezuela) LD Martínez	4	6	[11]
(Australia) R Hijikata (Australia) A Vukic	6	3	[9]
(Australia) A Harris (Germany) D Koepfer	6^{6}	2
(Portugal) N Borges (Sweden) A Göransson	7^{8}	6
(Greece) Pe Tsitsipas (Greece) S Tsitsipas	4	3
4	(Australia) M Purcell (Australia) J Thompson	6	6
(United Kingdom) J Draper (United Kingdom) D Evans	3	3
(United States) W Blumberg (Norway) C Ruud	6	6
(United States) E King (United States) R Stalder	6	1	[10]
2	(Monaco) H Nys (Poland) J Zieliński	4	6	[6]

Quarterfinals
1	(Mexico) S González (United Kingdom) N Skupski	6	6^{2}	[6]
(Ecuador) G Escobar (Kazakhstan) A Nedovyesov	3	7^{7}	[10]
(Argentina) G Andreozzi (Mexico) MÁ Reyes-Varela	6	6
WC	(Mexico) H Hach Verdugo (Venezuela) LD Martínez	2	4
(Portugal) N Borges (Sweden) A Göransson	6	1	[4]
4	(Australia) M Purcell (Australia) J Thompson	2	6	[10]
(United States) W Blumberg (Norway) C Ruud	6	6
(United States) E King (United States) R Stalder	3	3

Semifinals
(Ecuador) G Escobar (Kazakhstan) A Nedovyesov	6	6
(Argentina) G Andreozzi (Mexico) MÁ Reyes-Varela	2	3
4	(Australia) M Purcell (Australia) J Thompson	7^{7}	6
(United States) W Blumberg (Norway) C Ruud	6^{1}	3

Final
(Ecuador) G Escobar (Kazakhstan) A Nedovyesov	5	6^{2}
4	(Australia) M Purcell (Australia) J Thompson	7	7^{7}
