= 2016 Vietnam Open (tennis) =

- Date: 10–16 October
- Edition: 2nd
- Surface: Hard
- Location: Ho Chi Minh City, Vietnam

Champions

Singles
- (Australia) Jordan Thompson

Doubles
- (Thailand) Sanchai Ratiwatana / (Thailand) Sonchat Ratiwatana
- Vietnam Open

The 2016 Vietnam Open was a professional tennis tournament played on hard courts. It is the second edition of the tournament which is part of the 2016 ATP Challenger Tour. It took place in Ho Chi Minh City, Vietnam between 10 and 16 October 2016.

== Singles main-draw entrants ==
=== Seeds ===
Country	Player	Rank^{1}	Seed
TUN	Malek Jaziri	50	1
ISR	Dudi Sela	69	2
JPN	Taro Daniel	91	3
AUS	Jordan Thompson	97	4
UKR	Sergiy Stakhovsky	119	5
JPN	Go Soeda	131	6
SUI	Henri Laaksonen	139	7
JPN	Tatsuma Ito	145	8

- ^{1} Rankings are as of 3 October 2016.

=== Other entrants ===
The following players received wildcards into the singles main draw:

- (Vietnam) Lý Hoàng Nam
- (Indonesia) Christopher Rungkat
- (France) Maxime Tabatruong
- (Vietnam) Nguyễn Hoàng Thiên

The following players received entry from the qualifying draw:

- (India) Vijay Sundar Prashanth
- (France) Laurent Rochette
- (Japan) Shuichi Sekiguchi
- (India) Sanam Singh

== Champions ==
=== Singles ===
- (Australia) Jordan Thompson def. (Japan) Go Soeda, 5–7, 7–5, 6–1.

=== Doubles ===
- (Thailand) Sanchai Ratiwatana / (Thailand) Sonchat Ratiwatana def. (India) Jeevan Nedunchezhiyan / (India) Ramkumar Ramanathan, 7–5, 6–4.
