= Vietnam Open (tennis) =

- 2017 Vietnam Open (tennis)

Defunct tennis tournament
- Location: Ho Chi Minh City, Vietnam
- Venue: Lan Anh Country Club
- Category: ATP Challenger Series
- Surface: Hard / Outdoors
- Draw: 32S/32Q/16D
- Prize money: $50,000 + H

Vietnam Open was a tennis tournament held annually in Ho Chi Minh City, Vietnam in 2015, 2016 and 2017. The event was part of the ATP Challenger Tour and was played on outdoor hardcourts. For sponsorship reasons, the tournament was called Vietnam Open presented by Bia Saigon Special in 2015 and Vietnam Open presented by Vietravel in 2016. In 2017 the tournament was sponsored by a local real estate developer, the Hung Thinh Corporation. In January 2019, the Vietnam Open was hosted for the first time in Da Nang as the Da Nang Tennis Open.

== Past finals ==
=== Singles ===
Year	Champion	Runner-up	Score
2015	(India) Saketh Myneni	(Australia) Jordan Thompson	7–5, 6–3
2016	(Australia) Jordan Thompson	(Japan) Go Soeda	5-7, 7-5, 6-1
2017	(Russia) Mikhail Youzhny	(Australia) John Millman	6–4, 6–4

=== Doubles ===
Year	Champions	Runners-up	Score
2015	(France) Tristan Lamasine (Germany) Nils Langer	(India) Saketh Myneni (India) Sanam Singh	1–6, 6–3, [10–8]
2016	(Thailand) Sanchai Ratiwatana (Thailand) Sonchat Ratiwatana	(India) Jeevan Nedunchezhiyan (India) Ramkumar Ramanathan	7-5, 6-4
2017	(India) Saketh Myneni (India) Vijay Sundar Prashanth	(Japan) Ben McLachlan (Japan) Go Soeda	7–6^{(7–3)}, 7–6^{(7–5)}
