= Jordan Thompson (tennis) =

Australian tennis player (born 1994)

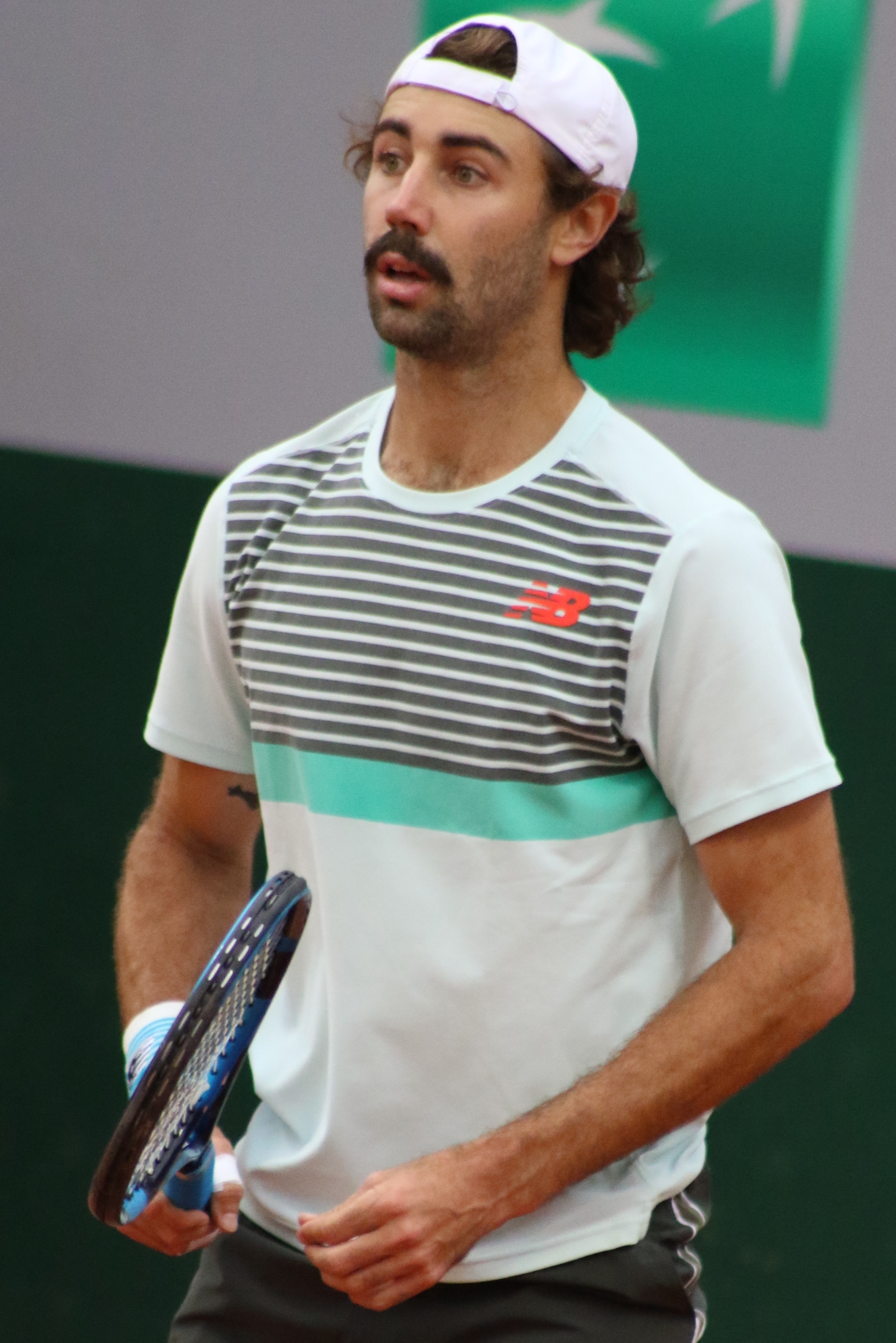
- Thompson at the 2021 French Open
- Country (sports): Australia
- Residence: Sydney, New South Wales, Australia
- Born: 20 April 1994 (age 32) Sydney, New South Wales, Australia
- Height: 1.83 m (6 ft 0 in)
- Turned pro: 2013
- Plays: Right-handed (two-handed backhand)
- Coach: Marinko Matosevic
- Prize money: US $ 9,339,086

Singles
- Career record: 154–176
- Career titles: 1
- Highest ranking: No. 26 (4 November 2024)
- Current ranking: No. 438 (5 October 2026)

Grand Slam singles results
- Australian Open: 2R (2017, 2019, 2020, 2024, 2025, 2026)
- French Open: 3R (2019)
- Wimbledon: 4R (2025)
- US Open: 4R (2020, 2024)

Other tournaments
- Olympic Games: 1R (2016)

Doubles
- Career record: 115–75
- Career titles: 8
- Highest ranking: No. 3 (18 November 2024)
- Current ranking: No. 106 (16 March 2026)

Grand Slam doubles results
- Australian Open: 2R (2014, 2023, 2024)
- French Open: 3R (2017, 2024)
- Wimbledon: F (2024)
- US Open: W (2024)

Other doubles tournaments
- Tour Finals: SF (2024)

Team competitions
- Davis Cup: F (2022); Record: 10–6
- Last updated on: 16 March 2026.

Jordan Thompson (born 20 April 1994) is an Australian professional tennis player. He reached career-high rankings of world No. 3 in doubles and of No. 26 in singles. Thompson won the Grand Slam title at the 2024 US Open with Max Purcell. He has won one singles and eight doubles ATP titles. He is currently the No. 8 Australian doubles player.

== Personal life ==
Thompson was born in Sydney and, along with tennis, grew up as an avid fan of rugby league. He supports the Wests Tigers in the National Rugby League. Thompson names Lleyton Hewitt as his tennis idol. Thompson has a tattoo on his right bicep of the Australian coat of arms and Olympic rings which he got after playing in the 2016 Olympic Games. Thompson's mantra is "hard work always pays off".

== Junior career ==
The highlight of his junior career came at the 2012 US Open when he partnered with fellow Australian Nick Kyrgios to reach the doubles final. Thompson reached as high as No. 18 in the combined world rankings in October 2012, compiling a singles win–loss record of 82–38.

== Professional career ==
=== 2013: Pro beginnings ===
In 2013, Thompson made his debut on the professional circuit in qualifying at the 2013 Apia International Sydney where he lost to world number 81 Guillermo García López. After receiving a wild card he won his first professional match in qualifying at the 2013 Australian Open against Nicolas Renavand in the third set. He lost in the second round to 21st seed Ryan Sweeting.

Thompson then qualified and made the second round of the 2013 Burnie International losing to third seed John Millman. For the rest of the year he played mainly in Futures, where he made three finals. He won 2 titles, the Austria F5 ITF, Alice Springs F8 ITF and was runner-up of Sydney F9 ITF. Thompson later made his Grand Slam debut at the 2014 Australian Open after winning the wildcard play off against Benjamin Mitchell on 15 December 2013.

He finished 2013 with an ATP ranking of No. 320.

=== 2014: Grand Slam debut ===
Thompson started 2014 at the 2014 Brisbane International in qualifying where he lost in the first round against Tatsuma Ito. Thompson then competed at the 2014 AAMI Classic where he replaced Lleyton Hewitt in the draw. His first match was against world No. 9 Richard Gasquet. He almost caused a huge upset when he served for the match at 5–3 in the third set, and had two match points on Gasquet's serve in the next game. However, he lost the final set in a tiebreak by seven points to four.

He made his Grand Slam debut at the 2014 Australian Open after winning the Australian Open wildcard play off in December 2013.

He lost his second match to Mikhail Youzhny in straight sets. Thompson ended up finishing in seventh place after he upset world number 42 Juan Mónaco. This was Thompson's first victory over a top 50 player. Thompson lost in 5 sets to world number 21 Jerzy Janowicz in the first round of the 2014 Australian Open. On 21 January, Thompson was announced in the Australian squad of the 2014 Davis Cup as the back-up player.

In May, Thompson made the semifinal of the China International Challenger, which increased his ranking to a career-high of 277. In August, Thompson made his first Challenger final, but lost to Hyeon Chung in Bangkok. This further increased his ranking to 219. From September to November, Thompson competed in eight challenger tournaments throughout China, USA, Australia and Japan, with the second round being his best result. In December, Thompson won the Australian Open wildcard play off again, gaining him entry into the 2015 Australian Open.

=== 2015: Top 200 ===
Thompson earned a wild card into the 2015 Australian Open but lost in round 1 to João Sousa in straight sets. He then played in the Hong Kong Challenger and Burnie Challenger but lost in round at both. In February, Thompson made the semi-final of the Launceston Challenger before playing in Challenger events in Japan and China where his performance was a round 2. Thompson did win his first Challenger Doubles title with Ben Mitchell at Shimadzu Challenger. In March, Thompson returned to Australia where he won the F4 ITF title. In May, Thompson lost in round 1 of qualifying for the 2015 French Open before reaching the semi-final of the Romanian F4. In June, Thompson turned to grass where he lost in the first round of Manchester Challenger and in qualifying for 2015 Topshelf Open and Ilkley Challenger. His broke into the world's top 200 on the 24 August, with a ranking of 193. In October, Thompson made the finals of the Ho Chi Minh City and Traralgon Challengers, further increasing his ranking. He ended the year with a ranking of 154.

=== 2016: Top 100 ===
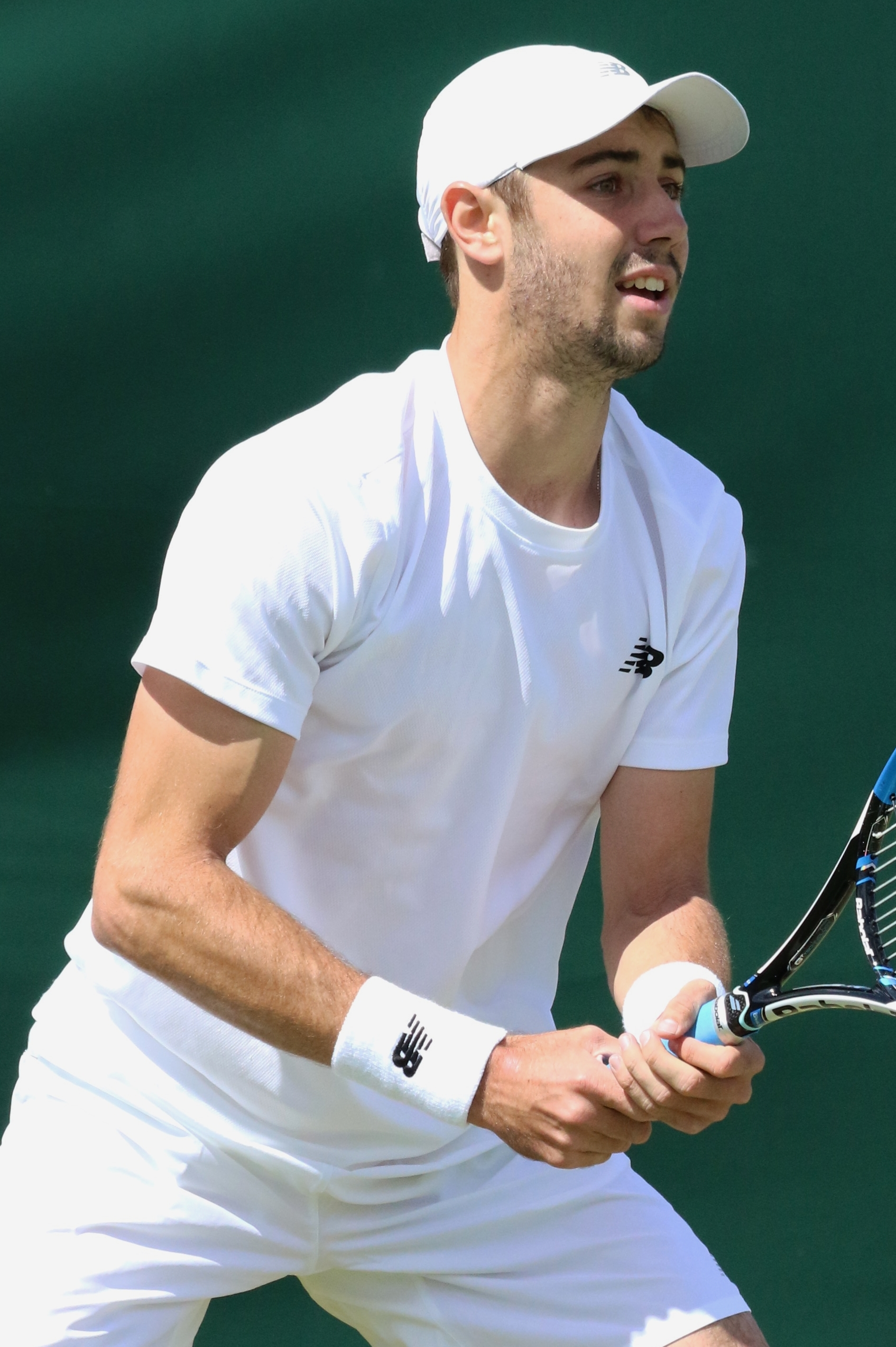
Thompson at the 2016 Wimbledon Championships

Thompson began the year at New Caledonia, where he made the semi-final. He was then given a wild card into the Sydney International, where he scored first his ATP World Tour win, when his opponent Martin Kližan retired when trailing 6–2, 4–0. In round two, Thompson played Bernard Tomic but lost in two sets. At the 2016 Australian Open, Thompson was given a wild card, but lost to Thomaz Bellucci in round 1. In February, Thompson won his first ATP Challenger Tour title at the La Mache Challenger.

On 1 May, Thompson won the biggest title of his career at the $100,000 2016 Kunming Open, which increased his ranking into the top 100 for the first time in his career.

Thompson was awarded a wild card into the French Open, where he won his first main draw Grand Slam match against Laslo Đere. In the second round, Thompson played the 27th seed Ivo Karlović, losing in set five 10–12 in a four and a half hour match. At Wimbledon, Thompson lost to 14th seed Roberto Bautista Agut in straight sets. At the 2016 Summer Olympics, Thompson lost in round 1 to Kyle Edmund. At the US Open, Thompson lost to Steve Darcis in round 1, despite leading 2 sets to love and having 2 match points. Following the match, Thompson said "I just felt like I left myself down, let other people down. It's not good." In October, Thompson won his third and fourth Challenger title of the year in Vietnam and Traralgon. Thompson ended the year with a ranking of 79.

=== 2017: Singles quarterfinal and doubles title ===
Thompson commenced the year at the 2017 Brisbane International, where he defeated Elias Ymer and David Ferrer to make his first ATP World Tour quarterfinal. He lost to Kei Nishikori in the quarterfinal. Thompson partnered Thanasi Kokkinakis in the doubles, where they reached the final, defeating Sam Querrey and Gilles Müller. In doing so, they became the first Australian duo to win the Brisbane International.

At the 2017 Apia International Sydney, Thompson defeated Nikoloz Basilashvili before losing to Philipp Kohlschreiber in round 2. At the 2017 Australian Open, Thompson recorded his first Australian Open win defeating João Sousa in round 1. He lost to Dominic Thiem in round 2. In February, Thompson made his debut at the Davis Cup, defeating Jiří Veselý. In March, Thompson made the main draw of the Mexican Open as a lucky loser. He defeated Feliciano López before losing to Yoshihito Nishioka in round 2. He lost in the first round of both Indian Wells and the Miami Masters, before returning to Australia when he defeated Jack Sock in the quarterfinals of the 2017 Davis Cup. In May, Thompson made the second round of Istanbul and Lyon, before losing to John Isner in the first round of 2017 French Open. In June, Thompson made the final of the Aegon Surbiton Trophy, losing to Yūichi Sugita.

Entering the Queen's Club Championships draw as a lucky loser, Thompson unexpectedly defeated the world No.1 Andy Murray in round one. The victory was Thompson's first against a top ten player, his first grass court win on the ATP World Tour and he became the first Australian player to beat Murray in an ATP-level singles match. Thompson lost in the second round to Sam Querrey. At Wimbledon, Thompson lost in round 1 to Albert Ramos Viñolas. In July, he reached the final of Levene Gouldin & Thompson Tennis Challenger. In August, Thompson came within two points of defeating eventual champion and world number 8 Alexander Zverev at the Citi Open before making the final of the Vancouver Challenger. At the US Open, Thompson defeated 13th seed Jack Sock before falling to Thomas Fabbiano in the second round. In October, Thompson qualified for the Shanghai Masters but lost to Diego Schwartzman in round 1. Thompson ended 2017 with a ranking of 94 in singles and 88 in doubles.

=== 2018: Back to the Challenger circuit ===
Thompson commenced 2018 by losing in the first round of the Brisbane International, Sydney International and the Australian Open. In February, Thompson returned the Challenger Tour, where he made two consecutive finals in Chennai and Kyoto. Thompson lost to Casper Ruud in round 1 of the French Open and to Sam Querrey in round 1 of Wimbledon. In July, Thompson reached another Challenger final at Birmingham. Thompson lost to Cameron Norrie in round 1 of the US Open and to Dominic Thiem in the Australia v Austria 2018 Davis Cup World Group play-offs. Following this in October, Thompson returned to the Challenger circuit reaching another three consecutive finals, winning the Traralgon ATP Challenger and Canberra Tennis International. In 2018, he reached eight Challenger finals, winning three. Thompson finished 2018 with a singles ranking of 72.

=== 2019: First ATP final, Top 50 in singles ===
Thompson commenced the 2019 season, losing to Alex de Minaur at both the Brisbane International and Sydney International. At the Australian Open, as a wildcard, Thompson defeated Feliciano López and lost to Andreas Seppi in the second round. In February, Thompson attained a then career-high singles ranking of 60 and reached the quarterfinals of the New York Open. The following month, Thompson defeated Grigor Dimitrov in a round three match at the 2019 Miami Open to reach the last 16 at a Masters 1000 tournament for the first time. He reached his first ATP final at the 2019 Libéma Open where he lost to Adrian Mannarino. As a result, he made his top 50 debut at World No. 46 on 17 June 2019. He reached a career-high ranking of World No. 43 on 15 July 2019.

=== 2020-21: US Open fourth round, Wimbledon third round ===
At the 2020 Australian Open, Thompson beat Alexander Bublik in straight sets, but lost to 12th seed Fabio Fognini in a match lasting over 4 hours.

Thompson achieved his best Grand Slam result to date by reaching the fourth round of the 2020 US Open, beating Stefano Travaglia, Egor Gerasimov and Mikhail Kukushkin before losing to 27th seed Borna Ćorić. Thompson finished 2020 with a singles ranking of World No. 51.

Thompson had a successful run at the 2021 Wimbledon Championships to the third round for the first time in his career where he defeated World No. 14 and 12th seed Casper Ruud in a five sets, his first win at this tournament and third top-20 win in the past three year. Thompson defeated Kei Nishikori in the second round before losing to Ilya Ivashka in the third round.

In July, Thompson reached the semifinals in Newport, where he lost to Jenson Brooksby. Thompson finished 2021 with a singles ranking of World No. 75.

=== 2022: First Challenger title since 2018 ===
Thompson didn't find his form until the grass court season got underway. He entered the 2022 Surbiton Trophy as the eighth seed where he only lost one set en route to the final. Thompson faced Denis Kudla in the title match where he won in straight sets, winning his first trophy since 2018.

The following week, he entered last minute into the 2022 Nottingham Open where he was seeded third. Thompson won his first and second round matches in straight sets against Antoine Bellier and Jay Clarke respectively. His quarterfinal match against Mikhail Kukushkin went to three sets with Thompson prevailing. He then overcame compatriot Alexei Popyrin, who was the fifth seed, in straight sets in the semifinal. He played the top seed Dan Evans for the title, however he came up short.

=== 2023: Second grass final, first top 5 win ===
Thompson started his 2023 season at the Adelaide International 1. Playing as a wildcard, he lost in the first round to Quentin Halys. At the Adelaide International 2, he fell in the final round of qualifying to Mikael Ymer. At the Australian Open, he was defeated in the first round by J. J. Wolf. Thompson partnered fellow Australian Max Purcell in the doubles event, but was eliminated in the second round by eventual finalists Hugo Nys and Jan Zielinski.

At the 2023 BNP Paribas Open he defeated Gaël Monfils and recorded his second top 10 win over world No. 3 and second seed Stefanos Tsitsipas to reach the third round of a Masters only for the third time in his career. He then lost to qualifier Alejandro Tabilo in the third round.

In Houston partnering again Max Purcell, he won his second doubles title.

He reached the final at the 2023 Libéma Open, losing to sixth seed Tallon Griekspoor in three sets.

At the 2023 Citi Open in Washington D.C., he recorded his 100th career win over seventh seed Adrian Mannarino. Next he defeated 11th seed Christopher Eubanks to reach the quarterfinals where he lost to top seed Taylor Fritz.

At the 2023 Japan Open Tennis Championships he upset third seed and world No. 9 Alexander Zverev in the first round for his second top 10 win of the season.

=== 2024-25: Los Cabos singles and US Open doubles titles ===
At his home tournament in 2024 Brisbane International having got a walkover from fourth seed Ugo Humbert, to get to the quarterfinals, he reached his first hardcourt semifinal, defeating former world No. 1 Rafael Nadal in a 3 and 1/2 hours match, saving three match points.

He reached again the quarterfinals at the 2024 Dallas Open but lost to third seed Ben Shelton. At the same tournament he won his third doubles title with Max Purcell. The following week, he reached another quarterfinal at the 2024 Delray Beach Open but lost to another American fourth seed Tommy Paul and moved into top 40 in the singles rankings on 19 February 2024. He became the Australian No. 2 behind Alex de Minaur.

Thompson reached back-to-back-to-back quarterfinals in three weeks, this time at the 2024 Los Cabos Open defeating wildcard Ernesto Escobedo and his cousin, qualifier Emilio Nava. Next, he saved three match points in a comeback win over Alex Michelsen to reach his second hardcourt semifinal. He reached his third ATP final winning his semifinal match against top seed Alexander Zverev on the seventh match point in 3 hours and 40 minutes, the longest match in the history of the tournament. It was his fourth Top 10 win and his second against Zverev since October 2023 in Tokyo. He won his first singles title defeating third seed Casper Ruud in straight sets. At the same tournament he also won the title in the doubles event with Max Purcell after having to play two doubles matches in the same day, in addition to his singles final match. In April, as defending champions, the pair Thompson and Purcell won their fourth title as a team at the 2024 U.S. Men's Clay Court Championships.

At the Madrid Open Thompson and Sebastian Korda won their first Masters 1000 doubles title as a team. Losing only one set they defeated top seeds Rohan Bopanna and Matthew Ebden en route. With winning the title, Thompson became the first Australian man to win in Madrid. Partnering former Wimbledon doubles champion Max Purcell, he reached his first Grand Slam final at the All England Club. As a result he moved into the top 25 in the doubles rankings on 15 July 2024. They were defeated in the final by first time Major champions Henry Patten and Harri Heliövaara in a three-setter with three tiebreaks, after having three match points in the third set. At the same tournament, in singles, he reached the second round with a win over Pavel Kotov in five sets, coming back from a two-set deficit.

Following a quarterfinal showing at the 2024 Mubadala Citi DC Open with a win over ninth seed Giovanni Mpetshi Perricard, he reached the top 30 in the singles rankings on 5 August 2024.

With Purcell, he reached a second Grand Slam final in doubles at the 2024 US Open, defeating American duo and 13th seeds Nathaniel Lammons and Jackson Withrow. They defeated tenth seeds Kevin Krawietz and Tim Pütz lifting their first Grand Slam trophy as a team, and the first at this level for Thompson and second for Purcell. At the same tournament, in singles, he reached the round of 16 for a second time at a Slam in his career with an upset over seventh seed Hubert Hurkacz, his fifth top 10 career win.

On 14 October 2024, Thompson rose to a career high of No. 5 in the ATP doubles rankings overtaking Matthew Ebden as Australia's top men's doubles player. He reached his first singles Masters 1000 quarterfinal at the Paris Masters with wins over Pedro Martínez, seventh seed Casper Ruud and Adrian Mannarino. Not being able to defend his quarterfinal points at the 2025 Rolex Paris Masters, Thompson fell off the top 100 on 3 November 2025.

== Performance timelines ==
Key
W	F	SF	QF	#R	RR	Q#	P#	DNQ	A	Z#	PO	G	S	B	NMS	NTI	P	NH

(W) winner; (F) finalist; (SF) semifinalist; (QF) quarterfinalist; (#R) rounds 4, 3, 2, 1; (RR) round-robin stage; (Q#) qualification round; (P#) preliminary round; (DNQ) did not qualify; (A) absent; (Z#) Davis/Fed Cup Zonal Group (with number indication) or (PO) play-off; (G) gold, (S) silver or (B) bronze Olympic/Paralympic medal; (NMS) not a Masters tournament; (NTI) not a Tier I tournament; (P) postponed; (NH) not held; (SR) strike rate (events won / competed); (W–L) win–loss record.
To avoid confusion and double counting, these charts are updated at the conclusion of a tournament or when the player's participation has ended.

=== Singles ===
Current through the 2025 US Open.

Tournament	2013	2014	2015	2016	2017	2018	2019	2020	2021	2022	2023	2024	2025	SR	W–L	Win%
Grand Slam tournaments
Australian Open	Q2	1R	1R	1R	2R	1R	2R	2R	1R	1R	1R	2R	2R	0 / 12	5–12	29%
French Open	A	A	Q1	2R	1R	1R	3R	1R	1R	1R	1R	1R	1R	0 / 10	3–10	23%
Wimbledon	A	A	A	1R	1R	1R	1R	NH	3R	2R	2R	2R	4R	0 / 9	8–9	47%
US Open	A	A	A	1R	2R	1R	2R	4R	2R	2R	1R	4R	2R	0 / 10	11–10	52%
Win–loss	0–0	0–1	0–1	1–4	2–4	0–4	4–4	4–3	3–4	2–4	1–4	5–4	5–4	0 / 41	27–41	40%
National representation
Summer Olympics	not held			1R	not held				A	not held		A	NH	0 / 1	0–1	0%
Davis Cup	A	A	A	A	SF	PO	QF	RR (Note: Edition is split into the two years due to COVID-19.)		F	F	SF		0 / 6	5–4	56%
ATP Tour Masters 1000
Indian Wells Open	A	A	A	A	1R	A	2R	NH	1R	2R	3R	1R	1R	0 / 7	4–7	36%
Miami Open	A	A	A	A	1R	A	4R	NH	2R	2R	1R	2R	3R	0 / 7	7–7	50%
Monte-Carlo Masters	A	A	A	A	A	A	A	NH	2R	A	A	A	2R	0 / 2	2–2	50%
Madrid Open	A	A	A	A	A	A	A	NH	Q1	A	A	2R	A	0 / 1	0–1	0%
Italian Open	A	A	A	A	A	A	A	A	A	A	A	1R	2R	0 / 2	1–1	50%
Canadian Open	A	A	A	A	A	A	1R	NH	A	A	A	2R	A	0 / 2	1–2	33%
Cincinnati Open	A	A	A	A	A	A	1R	Q2	A	A	2R	3R	1R	0 / 4	3–3	50%
Shanghai Masters	A	A	A	A	1R	A	A	not held			1R	2R	2R	0 / 4	1–4	20%
Paris Masters	A	A	A	A	A	A	A	3R	A	A	1R	QF	A	0 / 3	5–3	63%
Win–loss	0–0	0–0	0–0	0–0	0–3	0–0	4–4	2–1	2–3	2–2	3–5	6–7	5–5	0 / 32	24–30	44%
Career statistics
	2013	2014	2015	2016	2017	2018	2019	2020	2021	2022	2023	2024	2025	SR	W–L	Win%
Tournaments	0	1	1	10	16	10	22	12	21	17	23	26	11	Career total: 172		
Titles	0	0	0	0	0	0	0	0	0	0	0	1	0	Career total: 1		
Finals	0	0	0	0	0	0	1	0	0	0	1	2	0	Career total: 4		
Overall win–loss	0–0	0–1	0–1	3–10	13–17	1–11	26–22	11–12	21–21	11–17	19–23	35–24	11–11	1 / 170	151–170	47%
Win %	–	0%	0%	23%	43%	8%	54%	48%	50%	39%	45%	59%	50%	Career total: 47%		
Year-end ranking	320	276	154	79	94	72	63	51	75	84	55	26	108	$8,043,810		

=== Doubles ===
Tournament	2013	2014	2015	2016	2017	2018	2019	2020	2021	2022	2023	2024	2025	SR	W–L	Win%
Grand Slam tournaments
Australian Open	A	2R	A	A	1R	1R	1R	1R	A	1R	2R	2R	A	0 / 8	3–8	27%
French Open	A	A	A	A	3R	A	1R	2R	1R	2R	A	3R	1R	0 / 7	6–6	46%
Wimbledon	A	A	A	2R	2R	A	2R	NH	1R	2R	3R	F		0 / 7	11–7	61%
US Open	A	A	A	A	3R	A	1R	A	1R	A	1R	W		1 / 5	8–4	67%
Win–loss	0–0	1–1	0–0	1–1	5–4	0–1	1–4	1–2	0–3	2–3	3–3	14–3	0–1	1 / 27	28–26	52%
Year-end championships
ATP Finals	DNQ											SF		0 / 1	2–2	50%
National representation
Summer Olympics	not held			A	not held				A	not held		A	NH	0 / 0	0–0	–
Davis Cup	A	A	A	A	SF	A	QF	RR		F	A	SF		0 / 4	5–2	71%
ATP Tour Masters 1000
Indian Wells	A	A	A	A	A	A	A	NH	A	A	A	A	F	0 / 1	4–1	80%
Miami Open	A	A	A	A	A	A	A	NH	A	A	A	2R	QF	0 / 2	3–1	75%
Monte-Carlo Masters	A	A	A	A	A	A	A	NH	A	A	A	A	1R	0 / 1	0–1	0%
Madrid Open	A	A	A	A	A	A	A	NH	A	A	A	W	A	1 / 1	5–0	100%
Italian Open	A	A	A	A	A	A	A	A	A	A	A	1R	A	0 / 1	0–1	0%
Canadian Open	A	A	A	A	A	A	2R	NH	A	A	A	2R	A	0 / 2	2–2	50%
Cincinnati Open	A	A	A	A	A	A	A	A	A	A	A	2R	2R	0 / 2	2–1	67%
Shanghai Masters	A	A	A	A	A	A	A	not held			A	A	A	0 / 0	0–0	–
Paris Masters	A	A	A	A	A	A	A	A	A	A	A	SF	A	0 / 1	2–1	67%
Win–loss	0–0	0–0	0–0	0–0	0–0	0–0	1–1	0–0	0–0	0–0	0–0	10–4	7–3	1 / 11	18–8	69%
Career statistics
Titles	0	0	0	0	1	0	0	0	0	0	1	5	0	Career total: 7		
Finals	0	0	0	0	1	0	0	0	1	0	2	6	1	Career total: 11		
Overall win–loss	0–0	1–1	0–0	2–3	14–8	1–4	10–16	1–4	9–8	3–5	15–8	47–12	5–3	Career total: 109–72		
Win %	–	50%	–	40%	64%	20%	38%	20%	53%	38%	65%	80%	63%	Career total: 60%		
Year-end ranking	1555	261	229	115	88	296	160	213	188	466	106	3		60%		

== Significant finals ==
=== Grand Slam tournament finals ===
==== Doubles: 2 (1 title, 1 runner-up) ====
Outcome	Year	Championship	Surface	Partner	Opponents	Score
Loss	2024	Wimbledon	Grass	(Australia) Max Purcell	(Finland) Harri Heliövaara (United Kingdom) Henry Patten	7–6^{(9–7)}, 6–7^{(8–10)}, 6–7^{(9–11)}
Win	2024	US Open	Hard	(Australia) Max Purcell	(Germany) Kevin Krawietz (Germany) Tim Pütz	6–4, 7–6^{(7–4)}

=== Masters 1000 tournaments ===
==== Doubles: 2 (1 title, 1 runner-up) ====
Result	Year	Championship	Surface	Partner	Opponents	Score
Win	2024	Madrid Open	Clay	(United States) Sebastian Korda	(Uruguay) Ariel Behar (Czech Republic) Adam Pavlásek	6–3, 7–6^{(9–7)}
Loss	2025	Indian Wells Open	Hard	(United States) Sebastian Korda	(El Salvador) Marcelo Arévalo (Croatia) Mate Pavić	3–6, 4–6

== ATP Tour finals ==
=== Singles: 4 (1 title, 3 runner-ups) ===
Legend Grand Slam (0–0) ATP Masters 1000 (0–0) ATP 500 (0–0) ATP 250 (1–3)	Finals by surface Hard (1–1) Clay (0–0) Grass (0–2)	Finals by setting Outdoor (1–3) Indoor (0–0)

Result	W–L	Date	Tournament	Tier	Surface	Opponent	Score
Loss	0–1	Jun 2019	Rosmalen Grass Court Championships, Netherlands	ATP 250	Grass	(France) Adrian Mannarino	6–7^{(7–9)}, 3–6
Loss	0–2	Jun 2023	Rosmalen Grass Court Championships, Netherlands	ATP 250	Grass	(Netherlands) Tallon Griekspoor	7–6^{(7–4)}, 6–7^{(3–7)}, 3–6
Win	1–2	Feb 2024	Los Cabos Open, Mexico	ATP 250	Hard	(Norway) Casper Ruud	6–3, 7–6^{(7–4)}
Loss	1–3	Jul 2024	Atlanta Open, United States	ATP 250	Hard	(Japan) Yoshihito Nishioka	6–4, 6–7^{(7–2)}, 2–6

=== Doubles: 12 (8 titles, 4 runner-ups) ===
Legend Grand Slam (1–1) ATP Masters 1000 (1–1) ATP 500 (0–0) ATP 250 (6–2)	Finals by surface Hard (4–3) Clay (3–0) Grass (1–1)	Finals by setting Outdoor (7–4) Indoor (1–0)

Result	W–L	Date	Tournament	Tier	Surface	Partner	Opponents	Score
Win	1–0	Jan 2017	Brisbane International, Australia	ATP 250	Hard	(Australia) Thanasi Kokkinakis	(Luxembourg) Gilles Müller (United States) Sam Querrey	7–6^{(9–7)}, 6–4
Loss	1–1	Jul 2021	Atlanta Open, United States	ATP 250	Hard	(United States) Steve Johnson	(United States) Reilly Opelka (Italy) Jannik Sinner	4–6, 7–6^{(8–6)}, [3–10]
Win	2–1	Apr 2023	U.S. Men's Clay Court Championships, United States	ATP 250	Clay	(Australia) Max Purcell	(United Kingdom) Julian Cash (United Kingdom) Henry Patten	4–6, 6–4, [10–5]
Loss	2–2	Jul 2023	Atlanta Open, United States	ATP 250	Hard	(Australia) Max Purcell	(United States) Nathaniel Lammons (United States) Jackson Withrow	6–7^{(3–7)}, 6–7^{(4–7)}
Win	3–2	Feb 2024	Dallas Open, United States	ATP 250	Hard (i)	(Australia) Max Purcell	(United States) William Blumberg (Australia) Rinky Hijikata	6–4, 2–6, [10–8]
Win	4–2	Feb 2024	Los Cabos Open, Mexico	ATP 250	Hard	(Australia) Max Purcell	(Ecuador) Gonzalo Escobar (Kazakhstan) Aleksandr Nedovyesov	7–5, 7–6^{(7–2)}
Win	5–2	Apr 2024	U.S. Men's Clay Court Championships, United States (2)	ATP 250	Clay	(Australia) Max Purcell	(United States) William Blumberg (Australia) John Peers	7–5, 6–1
Win	6–2	Apr 2024	Madrid Open, Spain	Masters 1000	Clay	(United States) Sebastian Korda	(Uruguay) Ariel Behar (Czech Republic) Adam Pavlásek	6–3, 7–6^{(9–7)}
Loss	6–3	Jul 2024	Wimbledon Championships, United Kingdom	Grand Slam	Grass	(Australia) Max Purcell	(Finland) Harri Heliövaara (United Kingdom) Henry Patten	7–6^{(9–7)}, 6–7^{(8–10)}, 6–7^{(9–11)}
Win	7–3	Sep 2024	US Open, United States	Grand Slam	Hard	(Australia) Max Purcell	(Germany) Kevin Krawietz (Germany) Tim Pütz	6–4, 7–6^{(7–4)}
Loss	7–4	Mar 2025	Indian Wells Open, United States	Masters 1000	Hard	(United States) Sebastian Korda	(El Salvador) Marcelo Arévalo (Croatia) Mate Pavić	3–6, 4–6
Win	8–4	Jun 2025	Rosmalen Championships, Netherlands	ATP 250	Grass	(Australia) Matthew Ebden	(United Kingdom) Julian Cash (United Kingdom) Lloyd Glasspool	6–4, 3–6, [10–7]

== Team competition finals ==
=== Davis Cup: 2 (2 runner-ups) ===
Result	Date	Tournament	Surface	Partners	Opponents	Score
Loss	Nov 2022	Davis Cup, Málaga, Spain	Hard (i)	(Australia) Alex de Minaur (Australia) Thanasi Kokkinakis (Australia) Max Purcell (Australia) Matthew Ebden	(Canada) Félix Auger-Aliassime (Canada) Denis Shapovalov (Canada) Vasek Pospisil (Canada) Alexis Galarneau (Canada) Gabriel Diallo	0–2
Loss	Nov 2023	Davis Cup, Málaga, Spain	Hard (i)	(Australia) Alex de Minaur (Australia) Alexei Popyrin (Australia) Max Purcell (Australia) Matthew Ebden	(Italy) Jannik Sinner (Italy) Lorenzo Musetti (Italy) Matteo Arnaldi (Italy) Lorenzo Sonego (Italy) Simone Bolelli	0–2

== ATP Challenger and ITF Futures finals ==
=== Singles: 32 (16–16) ===
Legend ATP Challenger (11–13) ITF Futures (5–3)	Finals by surface Hard (12–11) Clay (3–2) Grass (1–2) Carpet (0–1)

Result	W–L	Date	Tournament	Tier	Surface	Opponent	Score
Win	1–0	Jul 2013	Austria F5, Bad Waltersdorf	Futures	Clay	(Austria) Patrick Ofner	1–6, 6–4, 6–0
Win	2–0	Sep 2013	Australia F8, Alice Springs	Futures	Hard	(Japan) Yuichi Ito	6–4, 6–1
Loss	2–1	Oct 2013	Australia F9, Sydney	Futures	Hard	(Australia) Greg Jones	6–3, 5–7, 1–6
Loss	2–2	Mar 2014	Australia F2, Port Pirie	Futures	Hard	(Australia) Luke Saville	2–6, 1–3 ret.
Loss	2–3	May 2014	Croatia F10, Bol	Futures	Clay	(Australia) Maverick Banes	6–7^{(6–8)}, 6–4, 3–6
Loss	2–4	Sep 2014	Bangkok, Thailand	Challenger	Hard	(South Korea) Chung Hyeon	6–7^{(0–7)}, 4–6
Win	3–4	Mar 2015	Australia F4, Melbourne	Futures	Clay	(New Zealand) José Statham	6–1, 7–5
Win	4–4	Aug 2015	Thailand F6, Bangkok	Futures	Hard	(Chinese Taipei) Chen Ti	6–2, 6–2
Win	5–4	Aug 2015	Thailand F7, Bangkok	Futures	Hard	(Chinese Taipei) Chen Ti	6–0, 3–6, 6–2
Loss	5–5	Oct 2015	Ho Chi Minh City, Vietnam	Challenger	Hard	(India) Saketh Myneni	5–7, 3–6
Loss	5–6	Nov 2015	Traralgon, Australia	Challenger	Hard	(Australia) Matthew Ebden	5–7, 3–6
Win	6–6	Feb 2016	Cherbourg, France	Challenger	Hard (i)	(Czech Republic) Adam Pavlásek	4–6, 6–4, 6–1
Win	7–6	May 2016	Anning, China, P.R.	Challenger	Clay	(France) Mathias Bourgue	6–3, 6–2
Win	8–6	Oct 2016	Ho Chi Minh City, Vietnam	Challenger	Hard	(Japan) Go Soeda	5–7, 7–5, 6–1
Win	9–6	Oct 2016	Traralgon, Australia	Challenger	Hard	(Slovenia) Grega Žemlja	6–1, 6–2
Loss	9–7	Jun 2017	Surbiton, Great Britain	Challenger	Grass	(Japan) Yūichi Sugita	6–7^{(7–9)}, 6–7^{(8–10)}
Loss	9–8	Jul 2017	Binghamton, USA	Challenger	Hard	(United Kingdom) Cameron Norrie	4–6, 6–0, 4–6
Loss	9–9	Aug 2017	Vancouver, Canada	Challenger	Hard	(Germany) Cedrik-Marcel Stebe	0–6, 1–6
Win	10–9	Feb 2018	Chennai, India	Challenger	Hard	(India) Yuki Bhambri	7–5, 3–6, 7–5
Loss	10–10	Feb 2018	Kyoto, Japan	Challenger	Carpet (i)	(Australia) John Millman	5–7, 1–6
Loss	10–11	Jul 2018	Seoul, Korea, Rep.	Challenger	Hard	(United States) Mackenzie McDonald	6–1, 4–6, 1–6
Loss	10–12	Jul 2018	Binghamton, USA	Challenger	Hard	(United Kingdom) Jay Clarke	7–6^{(8–6)}, 6–7^{(5–7)}, 4–6
Loss	10–13	Sep 2018	Columbus, USA	Challenger	Hard (i)	(United States) Michael Mmoh	3–6, 6–7^{(4–7)}
Loss	10–14	Oct 2018	Calgary, Canada	Challenger	Hard (i)	(Croatia) Ivo Karlović	6–7^{(3–7)}, 3–6
Win	11–14	Oct 2018	Traralgon, Australia	Challenger	Hard	(Japan) Yoshihito Nishioka	6–3, 6–4
Win	12–14	Nov 2018	Canberra, Australia	Challenger	Hard	(Spain) Nicola Kuhn	6–1, 5–7, 6–4
Loss	12–15	Apr 2019	Nanchang, China, P.R.	Challenger	Clay (i)	(Slovakia) Andrej Martin	4–6, 6–1, 3–6
Win	13–15	Jun 2022	Surbiton, England	Challenger	Grass	(United States) Denis Kudla	7–5, 6–3
Loss	13–16	Jun 2022	Nottingham, England	Challenger	Grass	(United Kingdom) Dan Evans	4–6, 4–6
Win	14–16	Sep 2022	Columbus, USA	Challenger	Hard (i)	(Ecuador) Emilio Gómez	7–6^{(8–6)}, 6–2
Win	15–16	Feb 2023	Rome, USA	Challenger	Hard (i)	(United States) Alex Michelsen	6–4, 6–2
Win	16–16	May 2023	Gwangju, South Korea	Challenger	Hard	(Australia) Max Purcell	6–3, 6–2

=== Doubles: 15 (11–4) ===
Legend ATP Challenger (6–1) ITF Futures (5–3)	Finals by surface Hard (4–4) Clay (5–0) Grass (0–0) Carpet (2–0)

Result	W–L	Date	Tournament	Tier	Surface	Partner	Opponents	Score
Loss	0–1	Mar 2014	Australia F2, Port Pirie	Futures	Hard	(Australia) Bradley Mousley	(Australia) Maverick Banes (Australia) Gavin van Peperzeel	3–6, 3–6
Win	1–1	Apr 2014	Australia F4, Melbourne	Futures	Clay	(Australia) Bradley Mousley	(Australia) Adam Hubble (Australia) Matt Reid	w/o
Win	2–1	May 2014	Croatia F8, Bol	Futures	Clay	(Australia) Matthew Barton	(Slovenia) Tomislav Ternar (Slovenia) Mike Urbanija	6–2, 6–3
Win	3–1	May 2014	Croatia F9, Bol	Futures	Clay	(Australia) Matthew Barton	(Croatia) Tomislav Draganja (Croatia) Dino Marcan	6–2, 6–1
Win	4–1	May 2014	Croatia F10, Bol	Futures	Clay	(Australia) Matthew Barton	(Australia) Maverick Banes (Australia) Gavin van Peperzeel	2–6, 6–3, [10–3]
Win	5–1	Mar 2015	Kyoto, Japan	Challenger	Carpet (i)	(Australia) Benjamin Mitchell	(Japan) Go Soeda (Japan) Yasutaka Uchiyama	6–3, 6–2
Win	6–1	Mar 2015	Australia F4, Melbourne	Futures	Clay	(Australia) Andrew Whittington	(Australia) Steven de Waard (Australia) Marc Polmans	6–2, 7–6^{(7–5)}
Loss	6–2	Aug 2015	Thailand F6, Bangkok	Futures	Hard	(Australia) Benjamin Mitchell	(Japan) Toshihide Matsui (Indonesia) Christopher Rungkat	6–4, 3–6, [9–11]
Loss	6–3	Oct 2015	Australia F6, Alice Springs	Futures	Hard	(Australia) Alex Bolt	(China) Gao Xin (China) Li Zhe	6–3, 3–6, [1–10]
Win	7–3	Feb 2016	Launceston, Australia	Challenger	Hard	(Australia) Luke Saville	(Australia) Dayne Kelly (Australia) Matt Reid	6–1, 4–6, [13–11]
Win	8–3	Mar 2016	Shenzhen, China, P.R.	Challenger	Hard	(Australia) Luke Saville	(India) Saketh Myneni (India) Jeevan Nedunchezhiyan	3–6, 6–4, [12–10]
Win	9–3	Jul 2016	Lexington, USA	Challenger	Hard	(Australia) Luke Saville	(South Africa) Nicolaas Scholtz (South Africa) Tucker Vorster	6–2, 7–5
Win	10–3	Nov 2016	Canberra, Australia	Challenger	Hard	(Australia) Luke Saville	(Australia) Matt Reid (Australia) John-Patrick Smith	6–2, 6–3
Loss	10–4	Aug 2017	Aptos, USA	Challenger	Hard	(Australia) Alex Bolt	(Israel) Jonathan Erlich (United Kingdom) Neal Skupski	3–6, 6–2, [8–10]
Win	11–4	Feb 2018	Kyoto, Japan	Challenger	Carpet (i)	(Australia) Luke Saville	(Japan) Go Soeda (Japan) Yasutaka Uchiyama	6–3, 5–7, [10–6]

== Junior Grand Slam finals ==
=== Doubles: 1 (1 runner-up) ===
Result	Date	Tournament	Surface	Partner	Opponents	Score
Loss	2012	US Open	Hard	(Australia) Nick Kyrgios	(United Kingdom) Kyle Edmund (Portugal) Frederico Ferreira Silva	7–5, 4–6, [7–10]

== National Representation ==
All Davis Cup matches: 10–6 (Singles: 5–4, Doubles: 5–2)
Round	Date	Opponents	Tie score	Venue	Surface	Match	Opponent(s)	Rubber score
2017 Davis Cup World Group
1R	3–5 Feb 2017	Czech Republic	4–1	Kooyong	Hard	Singles 1	Jiří Veselý	6–3, 6–3, 6–4
1R	3–5 Feb 2017	Czech Republic	4–1	Kooyong	Hard	Singles 5	Jan Šátral	7–6^{(7–5)}, 6–2
QF	7–9 Apr 2017	United States	3–2	Brisbane	Hard	Singles 1	Jack Sock	6–3, 3–6, 7–6^{(7–4)}, 6–4
SF	15–17 Sep 2017	Belgium	2–3	Brussels	Clay (i)	Doubles (with John Peers)	Ruben Bemelmans & Arthur De Greef	6–3, 6–4, 6–0
SF	15–17 Sep 2017	Belgium	2–3	Brussels	Clay (i)	Singles 5	Steve Darcis	4–6, 5–7, 2–6
2018 Davis Cup World Group play-offs
QR	14–16 Sep 2018	Austria	1–3	Graz	Clay	Singles 1	Dominic Thiem	1–6, 3–6, 0–6
2019 Davis Cup qualifying round
QR	1–2 Feb 2019	Bosnia and Herzegovina	4–1	Adelaide	Hard	Doubles (with John Peers)	Mirza Bašić & Tomislav Brkić	7–5, 6–1
2019 Davis Cup Finals
RR	19 Nov 2019	Colombia	3–0	Madrid	Hard (i)	Doubles (with John Peers)	Juan Sebastián Cabal & Robert Farah	6–3, 3–6, 7–6^{(8–6)}
RR	20 Nov 2019	Belgium	2–1	Madrid	Hard (i)	Doubles (with John Peers)	Sander Gillé & Joran Vliegen	1–0ret
QF	21 Nov 2019	Canada	1–2	Madrid	Hard (i)	Doubles (with John Peers)	Vasek Pospisil & Denis Shapovalov	4–6, 4–6
2020 Davis Cup qualifying round
QR	6–7 Mar 2020	Brazil	3–1	Adelaide	Hard	Singles 1	Thiago Monteiro	6–4, 6–4
2022 Davis Cup Finals
QF	22 Nov 2022	Netherlands	2–0	Málaga	Hard (i)	Singles 1	Tallon Griekspoor	4–6, 7–5, 6–3
SF	25 Nov 2022	Croatia	2–1	Málaga	Hard (i)	Doubles (with Max Purcell)	Nikola Mektić & Mate Pavić	6–7, 7–5, 6–4
2023 Davis Cup Finals
QF	22 Nov 2023	Czech Republic	2–1	Málaga	Hard (i)	Singles 1	Tomáš Macháč	4–6, 5–7
2024 Davis Cup Finals
RR	15 Sep 2024	Spain	1–2	Valencia	Hard (i)	Singles 1	Pablo Carreño Busta	6–2, 2–6, 6–7^{(3–7)}
QF	21 Nov 2024	United States	2–1	Málaga	Hard (i)	Doubles (with Matthew Ebden)	Tommy Paul & Ben Shelton	6–4, 6–4

== Wins over top 10 players ==
- He has a 7–21 record against players who were, at the time the match was played, ranked in the top 10.

Season	2017	..	2023	2024	Total
Wins	1		2	4	7

#	Player	Rk	Event	Surface	Rd	Score	Rk	Ref
2017
1.	(United Kingdom) Andy Murray	1	Queen's Club, United Kingdom	Grass	1R	7–6^{(7–4)}, 6–2	90	
2023
2.	(Greece) Stefanos Tsitsipas	3	Indian Wells Open, United States	Hard	2R	7–6^{(7–0)}, 4–6, 7–6^{(7–5)}	87	
3.	(Germany) Alexander Zverev	9	Japan Open, Japan	Hard	1R	6–3, 6–4	60	
2024
4.	(Germany) Alexander Zverev	6	Los Cabos Open, Mexico	Hard	SF	7–5, 4–6, 7–6^{(7–2)}	40	
5.	(Poland) Hubert Hurkacz	7	US Open, United States	Hard	2R	7–6^{(7–2)}, 6–1, 7–5	32	
6.	(Norway) Casper Ruud	9	Japan Open, Japan	Hard	1R	7–6^{(7–5)}, 6–1	29	
7.	(Norway) Casper Ruud	8	Paris Masters, France	Hard (i)	2R	7–6^{(7–3)}, 3–6, 6–4	28	
