= Nils Langer =

German tennis player

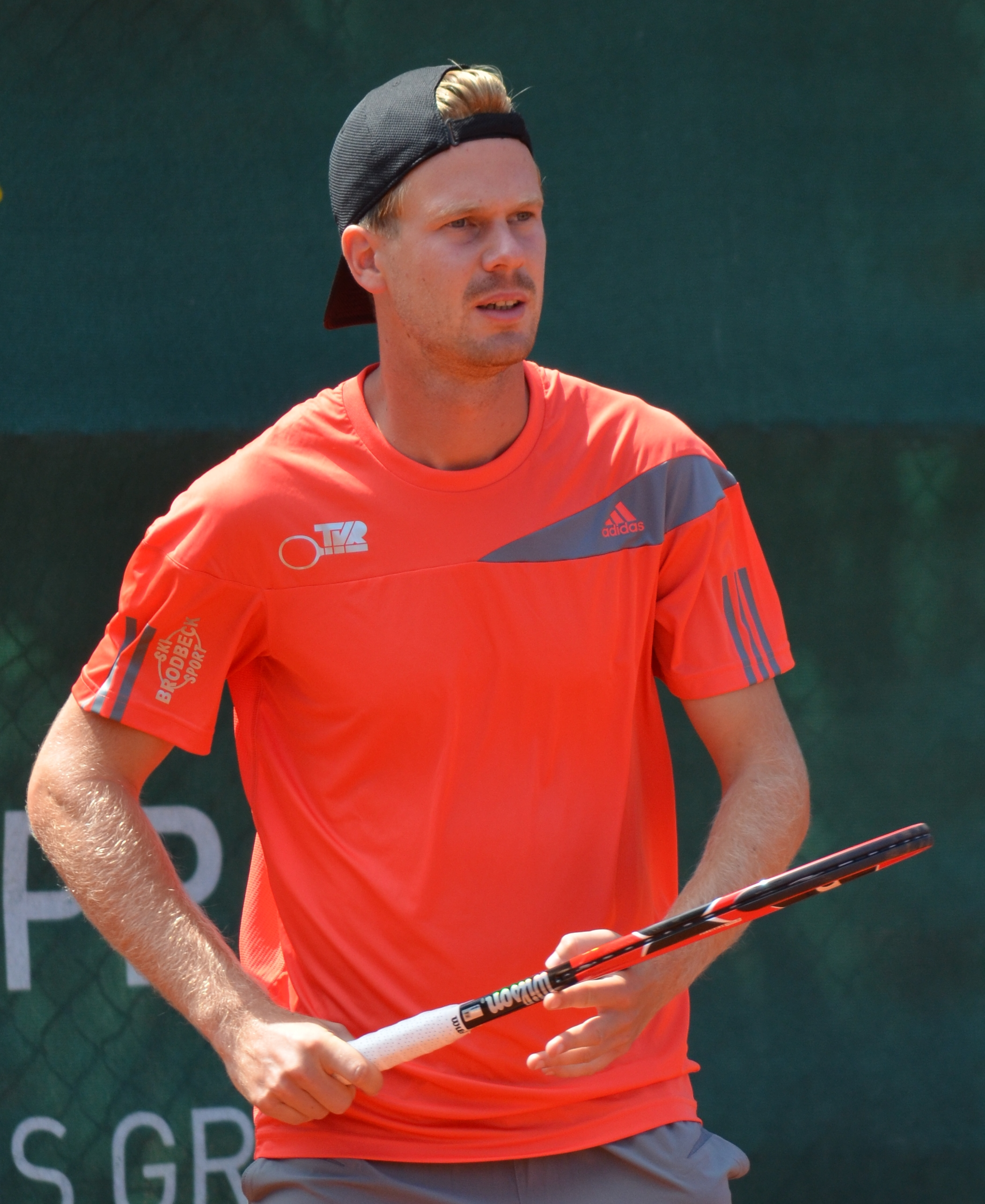
- Langer in 2015
- Full name: Nils Langer
- Country (sports): Germany
- Residence: Affalterbach, Germany
- Born: 25 January 1990 (age 35); Ludwigsburg, Germany
- Height: 1.93 m (6 ft 4 in)
- Plays: Right-handed (one-handed backhand)
- Prize money: $ 208,894

Singles
- Career record: 1–2 (at ATP Tour level, Grand Slam level, and in Davis Cup)
- Career titles: 0
- Highest ranking: No. 188 (7 March 2016)

Grand Slam singles results
- Australian Open: Q2 (2015)
- French Open: Q1 (2016)
- Wimbledon: Q1 (2016)
- US Open: Q2 (2015)

Doubles
- Career record: 0–1
- Career titles: 0
- Highest ranking: No. 277 (12 September 2016)

Nils Langer (German pronunciation: [ˈniːls ˈlaŋɐ]; born 25 January 1990, in Ludwigsburg) is a German retired tennis player.

Langer reached a career high ATP singles ranking of world No. 188, achieved in March 2016.

Langer made his ATP main draw debut at the 2009 International German Open in the doubles event where he partnered Kevin Krawietz, but lost in the first round to Marcelo Melo and Filip Polášek, 0–6, 4–6.

At the 2013 MercedesCup he qualified for the tournament, defeating Ivo Klec, Jan Mertl and Evgeny Korolev in the qualifying rounds. In the main draw he drew compatriot Robin Kern, a wildcard entrant, winning 3–6, 6–4, 6–3. His run came to an end where he lost to the second seed and compatriot Philipp Kohlschreiber, 5–7, 2–6.

== ATP Challenger Tour finals ==
=== Singles: 4 (0–4) ===
Result	W–L	Date	Tournament	Surface	Opponent	Score
Loss	0–1	Jul 2012	Oberstaufen, Germany	Clay	(Germany) Dominik Meffert	4–6, 3–6
Loss	0–2	Jul 2015	Marburg, Germany	Clay	(Spain) Íñigo Cervantes	6–2, 6–7^{(3–7)}, 3–6
Loss	0–3	Sep 2015	St Rémy, France	Hard	(Croatia) Ivan Dodig	3–6, 2–6
Loss	0–4	Jan 2017	Koblenz, Germany	Hard (i)	(Belgium) Ruben Bemelmans	4–6, 6–3, 6–7^{(0–7)}

=== Doubles: 2 (1–1) ===
Result	W–L	Date	Tournament	Surface	Partner	Opponents	Score
Win	1–0	Oct 2015	Ho Chi Minh City, Vietnam	Hard	(France) Tristan Lamasine	(India) Saketh Myneni (India) Sanam Singh	1–6, 6–3, [10–8]
Loss	1–1	Sep 2016	Como, Italy	Clay	(Austria) Gerald Melzer	(Czech Republic) Roman Jebavý (Slovakia) Andrej Martin	6–3, 1–6, [5–10]

== Singles performance timeline ==
Key
W	F	SF	QF	#R	RR	Q#	DNQ	A	NH

(W) winner; (F) finalist; (SF) semifinalist; (QF) quarterfinalist; (#R) rounds 4, 3, 2, 1; (RR) round-robin stage; (Q#) qualification round; (DNQ) did not qualify; (A) absent; (NH) not held; (SR) strike rate (events won / competed); (W–L) win–loss record.

Tournament	2012	2013	2014	2015	2016	2017	W–L
Grand Slam tournaments
Australian Open	A	A	A	Q2	Q1	A	0–0
French Open	A	A	A	A	Q1	A	0–0
Wimbledon	A	A	A	A	Q1	A	0–0
US Open	A	A	A	Q2	A	A	0–0
Career statistics
Overall win–loss	0–0	1–2	0–0	0–0	0–0	0–0	1–2
Year-end ranking	305	365	255	218	359	457	
